= East Harlem =

Neighborhood in New York City

- Neighborhood of Manhattan
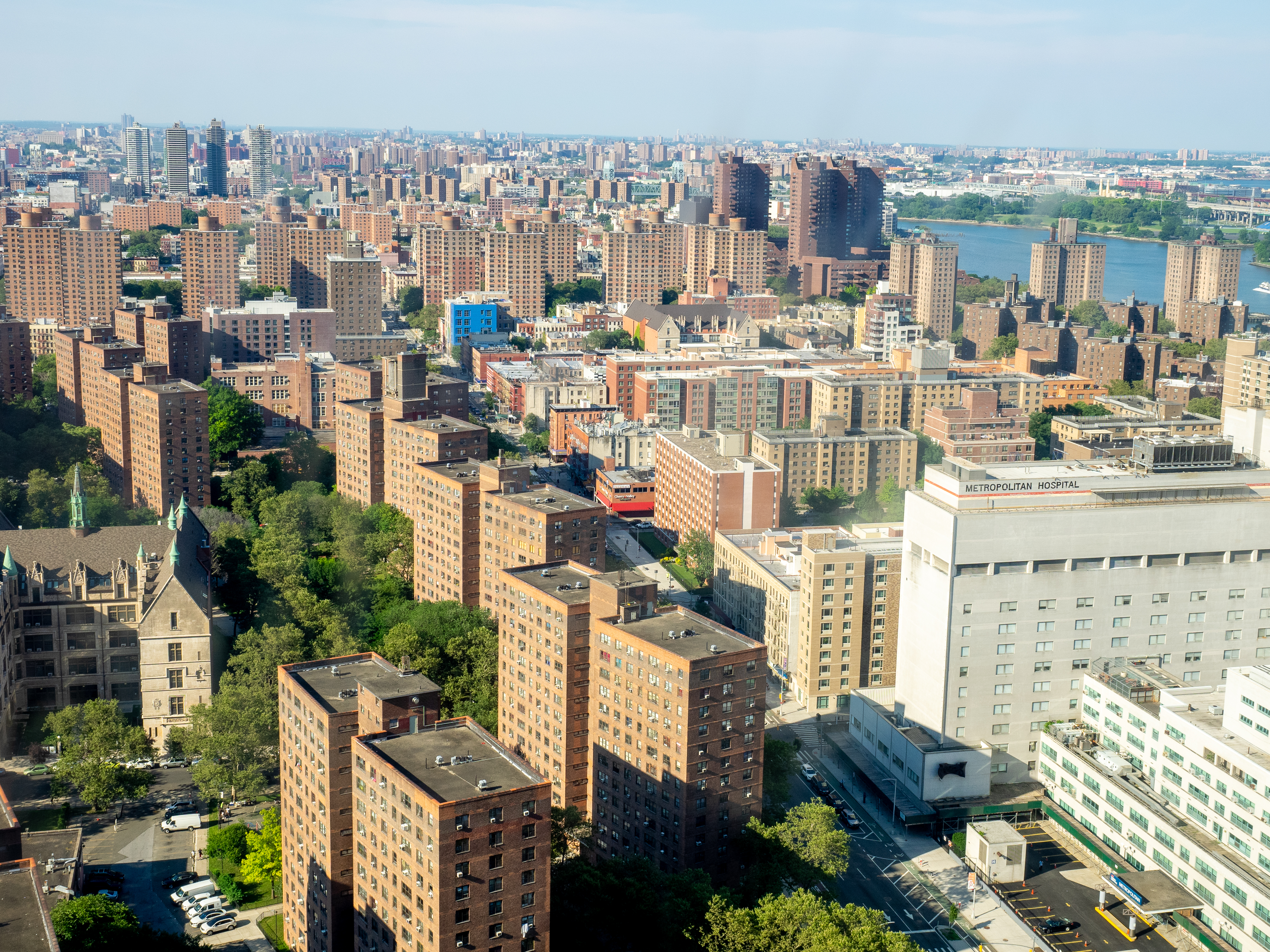
- Second Avenue and 97th Street as seen from the south in 2019
- Interactive map of East Harlem
- Coordinates: 40°47′55″N 73°56′30″W
- Country: United States
- State: New York
- City: New York City
- Borough: Manhattan
- Community District: Manhattan 11

Area
  - Total: 1.54 sq mi (4.0 km^{2})

Population (2010)
  - Total: 115,921
  - Density: 75,300/sq mi (29,100/km^{2})

Ethnicity
  - Hispanic: 52.1%
  - Black: 35.7%
  - White (non-Hispanic): 7.3%
  - Asian: 2.7%
  - Other: 0.2%

Economics
  - Median income: $21,480
- Time zone: UTC−5 (Eastern)
  - Summer (DST): UTC−4 (EDT)
- ZIP Codes: 10029, 10035
- Area code: 212, 332, 646, and 917
- East Harlem Historic District
- U.S. National Register of Historic Places
- U.S. Historic district
- Location within Manhattan Location within New York City Location within New York
- Location: Roughly bounded by E. 111th–120th Sts., Park, Lexington, Pleasant, 1st–3rd Aves., New York, New York
- Architectural style: Various (including Italianate, Italian Villa, Queen Anne)
- NRHP reference No.: 100004218
- Added to NRHP: July 10, 2019

East Harlem, also known as Spanish Harlem or El Barrio, and formerly Italian Harlem, is a neighborhood of Upper Manhattan in New York City, north of the Upper East Side and bounded by 98th Street to the south, Fifth Avenue to the west, and the East and Harlem Rivers to the east and north. Despite its name, it is generally not considered to be a part of Harlem proper, but it is one of the neighborhoods included in Greater Harlem.

The neighborhood has one of the largest Hispanic communities in New York City, mostly Puerto Ricans, as well as Dominicans, Salvadorans, Cubans, and Mexicans. The community is notable for its contributions to Latin freestyle and salsa music. East Harlem also includes the remnants of a once-predominant Italian community, or Italian Harlem. The Chinese population has increased dramatically in East Harlem since 2000.

East Harlem has historically suffered from many social issues, such as a high crime rate, the highest jobless rate in New York City, teenage pregnancy, AIDS, drug abuse, homelessness, and an asthma rate five times the national average. It has the second-highest concentration of public housing in the United States, behind Brownsville, Brooklyn. East Harlem is undergoing some gentrification, and in 2016 the city considered rezoning the area.

East Harlem is part of Manhattan Community District 11, and its primary ZIP Codes are 10029 and 10035. It is patrolled by the 23rd and 25th Precincts of the New York City Police Department.

== History ==
=== Early history ===
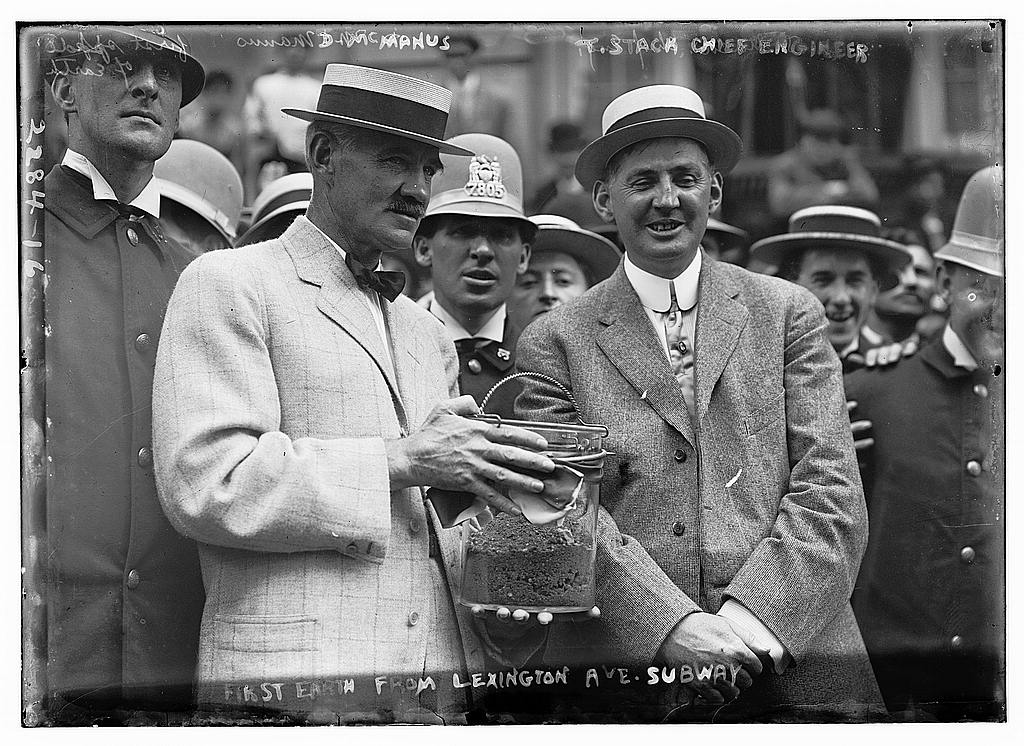
First earth from Lexington Avenue subway line in 1913

The area that became East Harlem was rural for most of the 19th century, but residential settlements northeast of Third Avenue and East 110th Street had developed by the 1860s. The construction of the elevated transit line to Harlem in 1879 and 1880, and the building of the Lexington Avenue subway in 1919, urbanized the area, precipitating the construction of apartment buildings and brownstones. The extension of cable cars up Lexington Avenue into East Harlem was stymied by the incline created by Duffy's Hill at 103rd Street, one of the steepest grades in Manhattan. East Harlem was first populated by poor German, Irish, Scandinavian, and Eastern European Jewish immigrants, with the Jewish population standing at 90,000 around 1917. In the 1870s, Italian immigrants joined the mix after a contractor building trolley tracks on First Avenue imported Italian laborers as strikebreakers. The workers' shantytown along the East River at 106th Street was the beginning of an Italian neighborhood, with 4,000 having arrived by the mid-1880s. As more immigrants arrived, it expanded north to East 115th Street and west to Third Avenue.

East Harlem consisted of pockets of ethnically sorted settlements – Italian, German, Irish, and Jewish – which were beginning to press up against each other, with the spaces still between them occupied by "gasworks, stockyards and tar and garbage dumps". In 1895, the Union Settlement Association, one of the oldest settlement houses in New York City, began providing services in the area, offering the immigrant and low-income residents a range of community-based programs, including boys and girls clubs, a sewing school and adult education classes.

=== Italian Harlem ===
Vestiges of Italian Harlem

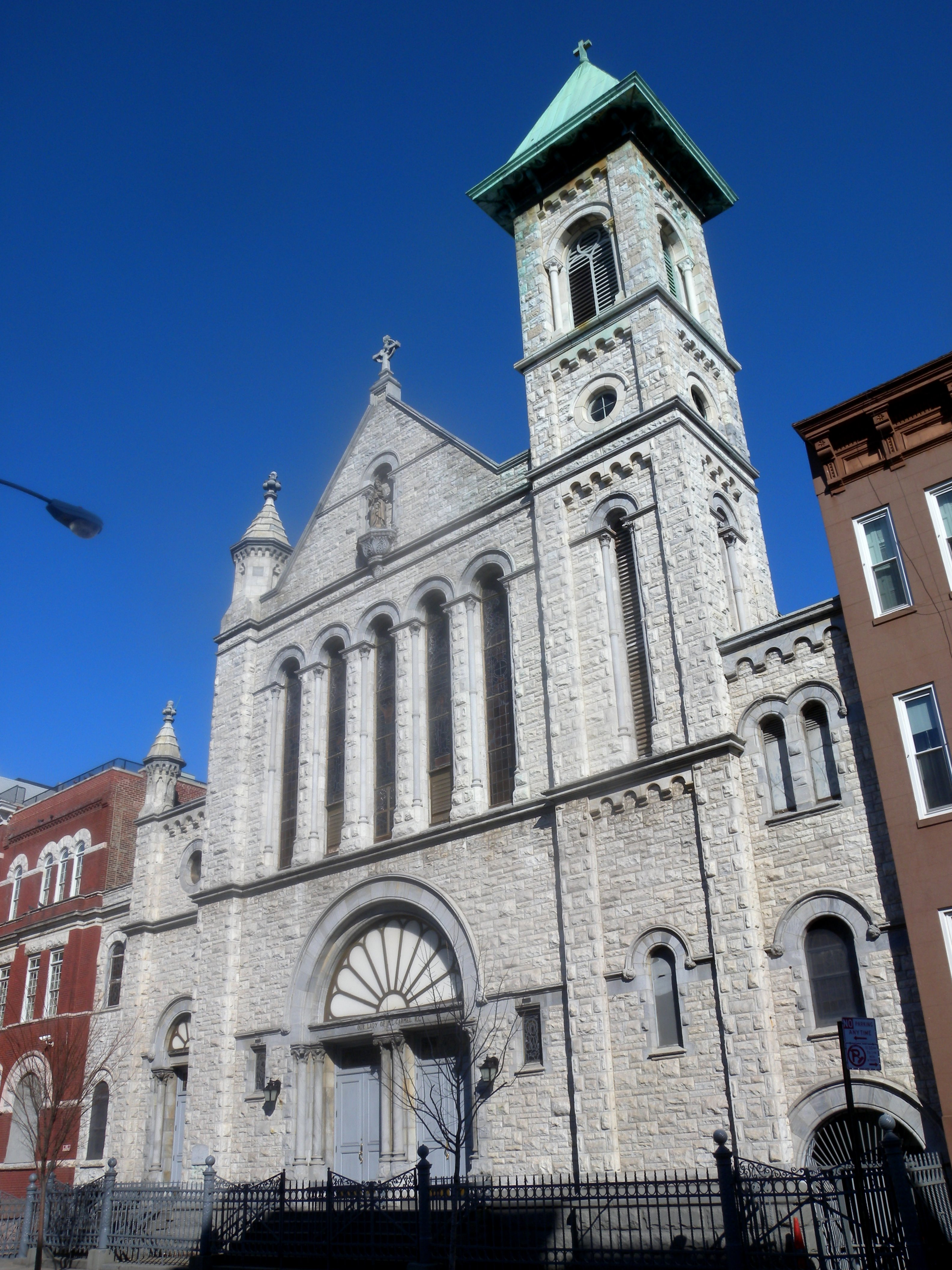
Church of Our Lady of Mount Carmel

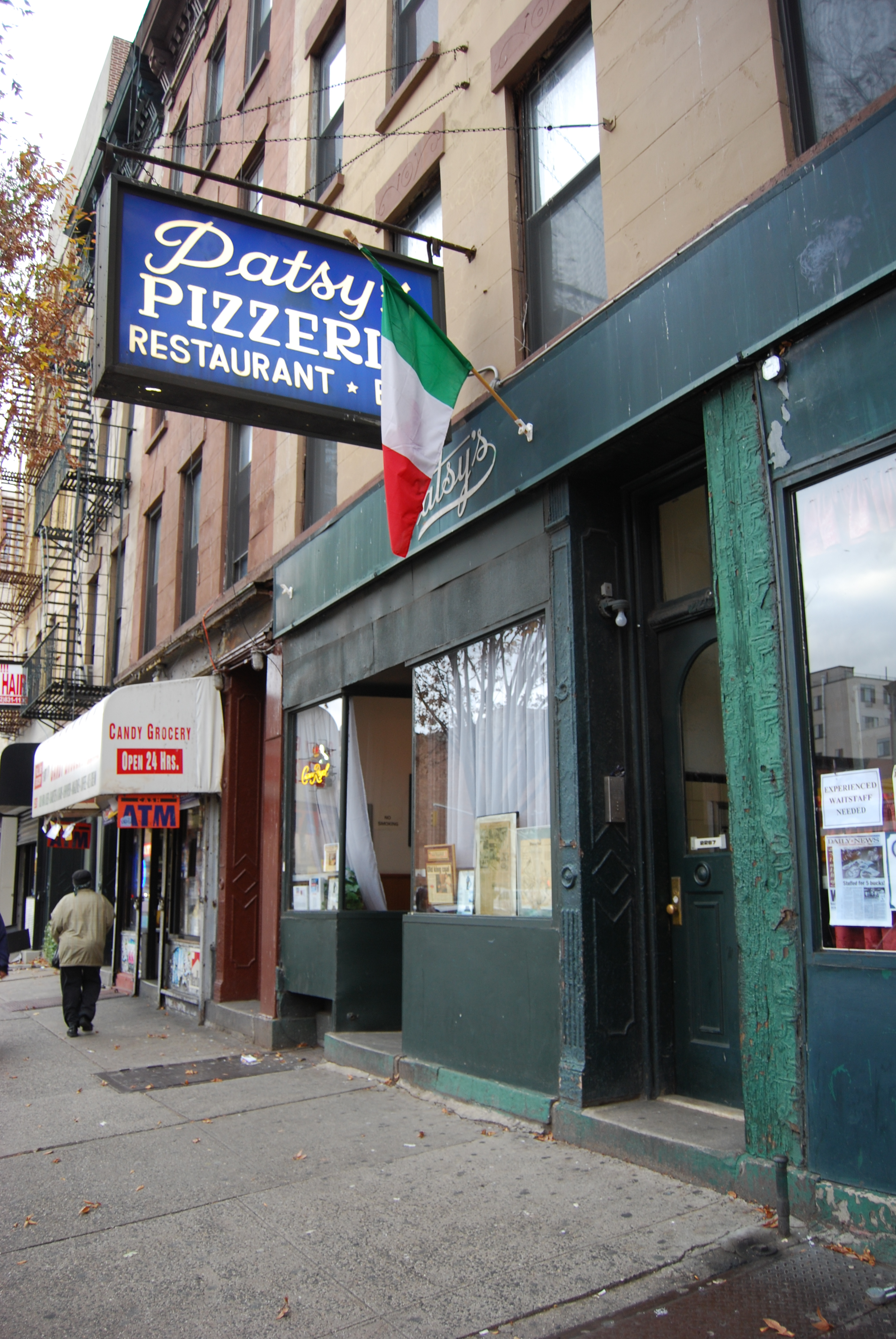
Patsy's Pizzeria

Southern Italians and Sicilians, with a moderate number of Northern Italians, soon predominated, especially in the area east of Lexington Avenue between 96th and 116th Streets and east of Madison Avenue between 116th and 125th Streets, with each street featuring people from different regions of Italy. The neighborhood became known as "Italian Harlem", the Italian American hub of Manhattan; it was the first part of Manhattan to be referred to as "Little Italy". The first Italians arrived in East Harlem in 1878, from Polla in the province of Salerno, and settled in the vicinity of 115th Street.

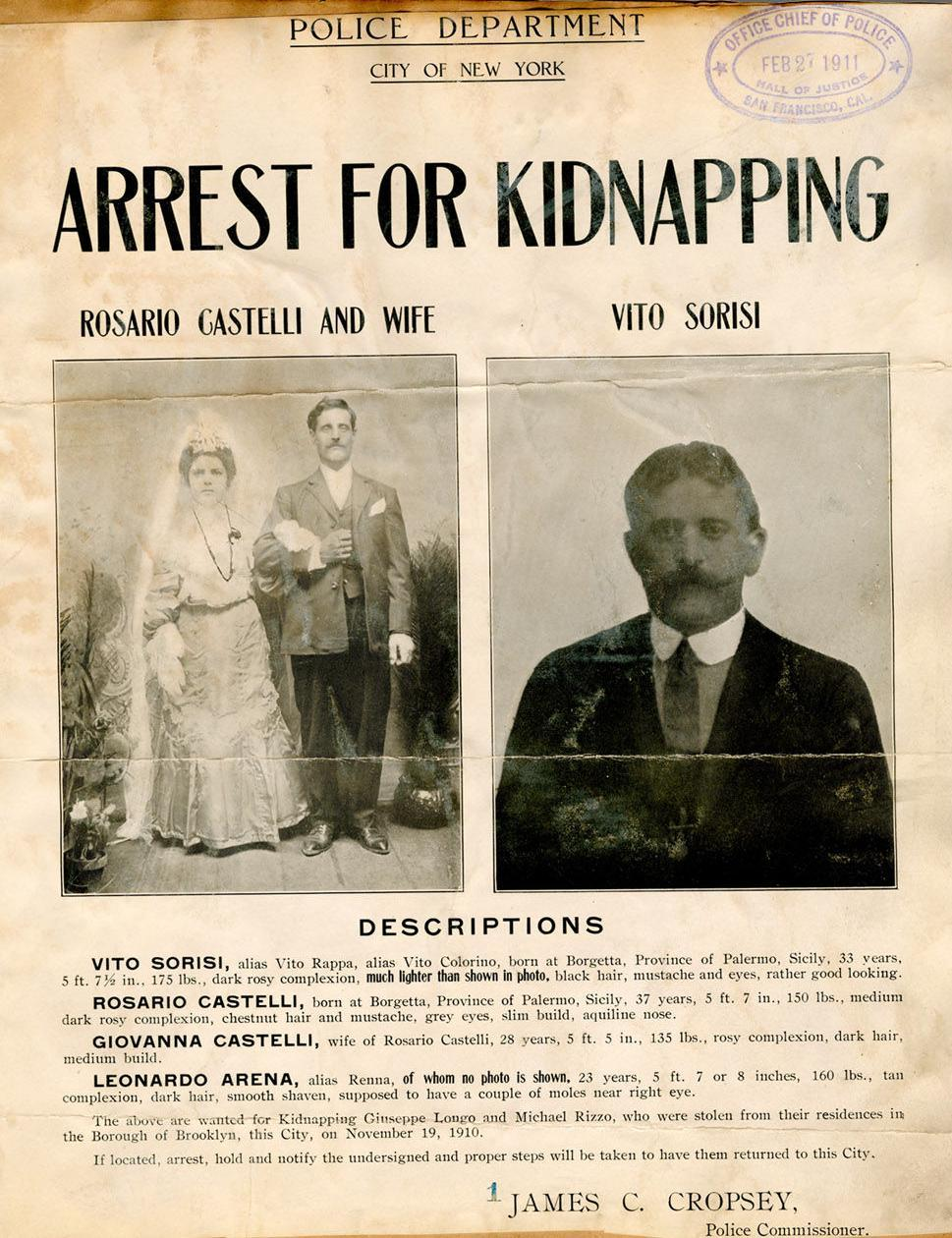
A New York Police Department wanted poster for Black Hand activity, 1910

There were many crime syndicates in Italian Harlem, from the early Black Hand to the bigger and more organized Italian gangs that formed the Italian-American Mafia. It was the founding location of the Genovese crime family, one of the Five Families that dominated organized crime in New York City. This includes the current 116th Street Crew of the Genovese family. During the 1970s, Italian East Harlem was also home to the Italian-American drug gang and murder-for-hire crew known as the East Harlem Purple Gang.

In the 1920s and early 1930s, Italian Harlem was represented in Congress by future Mayor Fiorello H. La Guardia. After becoming mayor, La Guardia helped plan a large expansion of Thomas Jefferson Park at First Avenue, between 111th and 114th Streets, in the mid-1930s. The neighborhood was represented, in the 1940s, by Italian-American civil rights lawyer, socialist, and activist Vito Marcantonio. The Italian neighborhood approached its peak in the 1930s, with more than 110,000 Italian-Americans living in its crowded, run-down apartment buildings. The 1930 census showed that 81 percent of the population of Italian Harlem consisted of first- or second-generation Italian Americans, somewhat less than the concentration of Italian Americans in the Lower East Side's Little Italy with 88 percent; Italian Harlem's total population, however, was three times that of Little Italy.

The character of the Italian-American community changed when, after the Second World War, the unhealthy tenements started to be demolished and replaced with better housing, forcing families to relocate. Despite this, Italian Harlem endured as a large and conspicuous community through the 1980s and 1990s, and even later, the Italian-American community in East Harlem remained strong in certain areas, particularly around Pleasant Avenue.

Today, the few remaining Italian-American residents in Harlem are predominantly older, clustered around Pleasant Avenue and the Our Lady of Mount Carmel Church, mainly from 114th to 118th Streets and the surrounding area. According to the 2000 Census, there were only 1,130 Italian-Americans still living in this area.

However, vestiges of the old Italian neighborhood remain. The annual Feast of Our Lady of Mount Carmel and the "Dancing of the Giglio", the first Italian feast in New York City, is still celebrated there every year on the second weekend of August by the Giglio Society of East Harlem and is centered around Church of Our Lady of Mount Carmel. Italian retail establishments still exist in Italian Harlem, such as Rao's restaurant, which started in 1896, and the original Patsy's Pizzeria, which opened in 1933. Another major Italian retail business in the neighborhood, a barbershop opened by Claudio Caponigro on 116th Street in the mid-1950s, was threatened with closure by a rent increase in May 2011 but ultimately closed only in 2019 when Mr. Caponigro retired.

=== Spanish Harlem ===
Puerto Rican and Latin American migration after the First World War established an enclave at the western portion of East Harlem – around 110th Street and Lexington Avenue – which became known as "Spanish Harlem". The area slowly grew to encompass all of East Harlem, including Italian Harlem, as Italians moved out – to the Bronx, Brooklyn, Long Island, upstate New York, and New Jersey – and Puerto Ricans moved in during another wave of immigration in the 1940s and 1950s.

The newly dominant Puerto Rican population, which reached 63,000 in 1950, continued to define the neighborhood according to its needs, establishing bodegas and botánicas as it expanded; by the 1930s there was already an enclosed street market underneath the Park Avenue railroad viaduct between 111th and 116th Streets, called "La Marqueta" ("The Market"). Catholic and evangelistic Protestant churches appeared in storefronts. Although "Spanish Harlem" had been in use since at least the 1930s to describe the Latino enclave – along with "Italian Harlem" and "Negro Harlem" – the name began to be used to describe the entire East Harlem neighborhood by the 1950s. Later, the name "El Barrio" ("The Neighborhood") began to be used, especially by residents of the area.

=== Decline ===
In the 1950s and 1960s, large sections of East Harlem were leveled for urban renewal projects, and the neighborhood was one of the hardest hit areas in the 1960s and 1970s as New York City struggled with budget deficits, race riots, urban flight, gang warfare, drug abuse, crime and poverty. Tenements were crowded, poorly maintained, and frequent targets for arson. In 1969 and 1970, a regional chapter of the Young Lords which were reorganized from a neighborhood street gang in Chicago by Jose (Cha-Cha) Jimenez, ran several programs including a Free Breakfast for Children and a Free Health Clinic to help Latino and poor families. The Young Lords came together with the Black Panthers and called for Puerto Rican independence and neighborhood empowerment.

=== Recent history ===
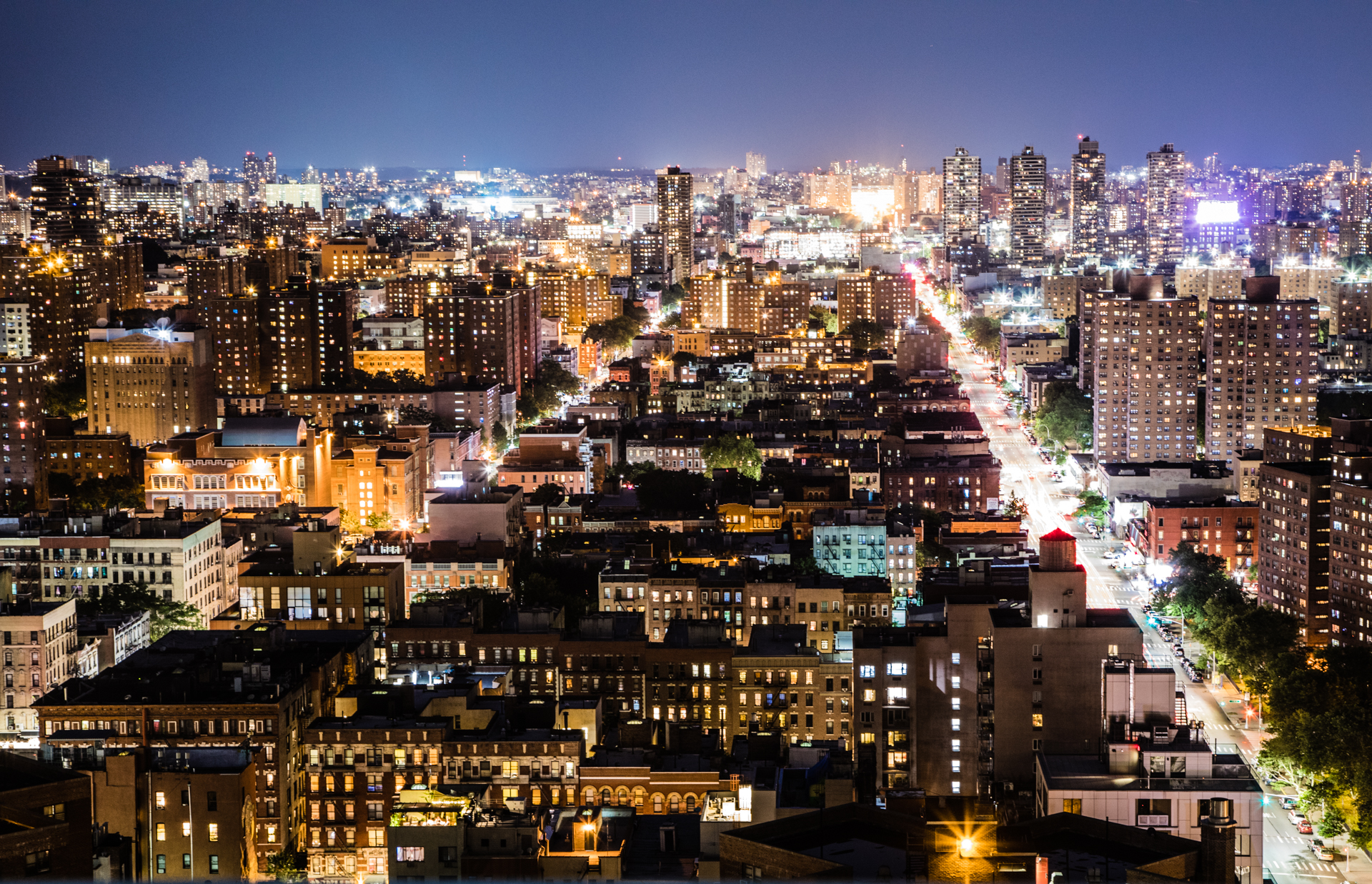
Looking north over East Harlem between Third and Lexington Avenues

By the beginning of the 21st century, East Harlem was a racially diverse neighborhood, with about a third of the population being Puerto Rican. As it has been throughout its history, it is predominantly a working-class neighborhood.

Until 2006, property values in East Harlem climbed along with those in the rest of New York City, leading to gentrification and changes to area demographics.

On March 12, 2014, at 9:00 EDT, a large explosion and fire at 1644–1646 Park Avenue killed eight people and injured more than 70.

The New York Post listed one part of the neighborhood – the block of Lexington Avenue between East 123rd and 124th Streets – as one of "the most dangerous blocks in the city" because police crime statistics for 2015 showed that 19 assaults had taken place there, more than for any other city block. The Post also reported that there were, according to the Harlem Neighborhood Block Association, "22 drug-treatment programs, four homeless-service providers and four transitional-living facilities" in East Harlem.

East Harlem has begun to feel the effects of gentrification. In February 2016, an article in The New York Times about "New York's Next Hot Neighborhoods" featured East Harlem as one of four such areas. A real-estate broker described it as "one of the few remaining areas in New York City where you can secure a good deal". The article mentioned new luxury developments, access to transportation, the opening of new retail stores, bars and restaurants, and national-brand stores beginning to appear on the outskirts of the neighborhood. Primarily, though, it was the cost of housing in comparison to the rest of Manhattan, which the article noted as the major factor. Beginning in 2016, the New York City government was seeking to rezone East Harlem "to facilitate new residential, commercial, community facility, and manufacturing development". The residents of the neighborhood generated a suggested zoning plan, the "East Harlem Neighborhood Plan", which was offered to the city in February 2017, but in August 2017 residents and the Manhattan Borough President, Gale Brewer, complained that the city had ignored their plan almost entirely.

In 2019, the oldest portion of the neighborhood, the blocks of East 111th through 120th Streets between Park and Pleasant Avenues, was listed on the National Register of Historic Places as the East Harlem Historic District.

== Demographics ==
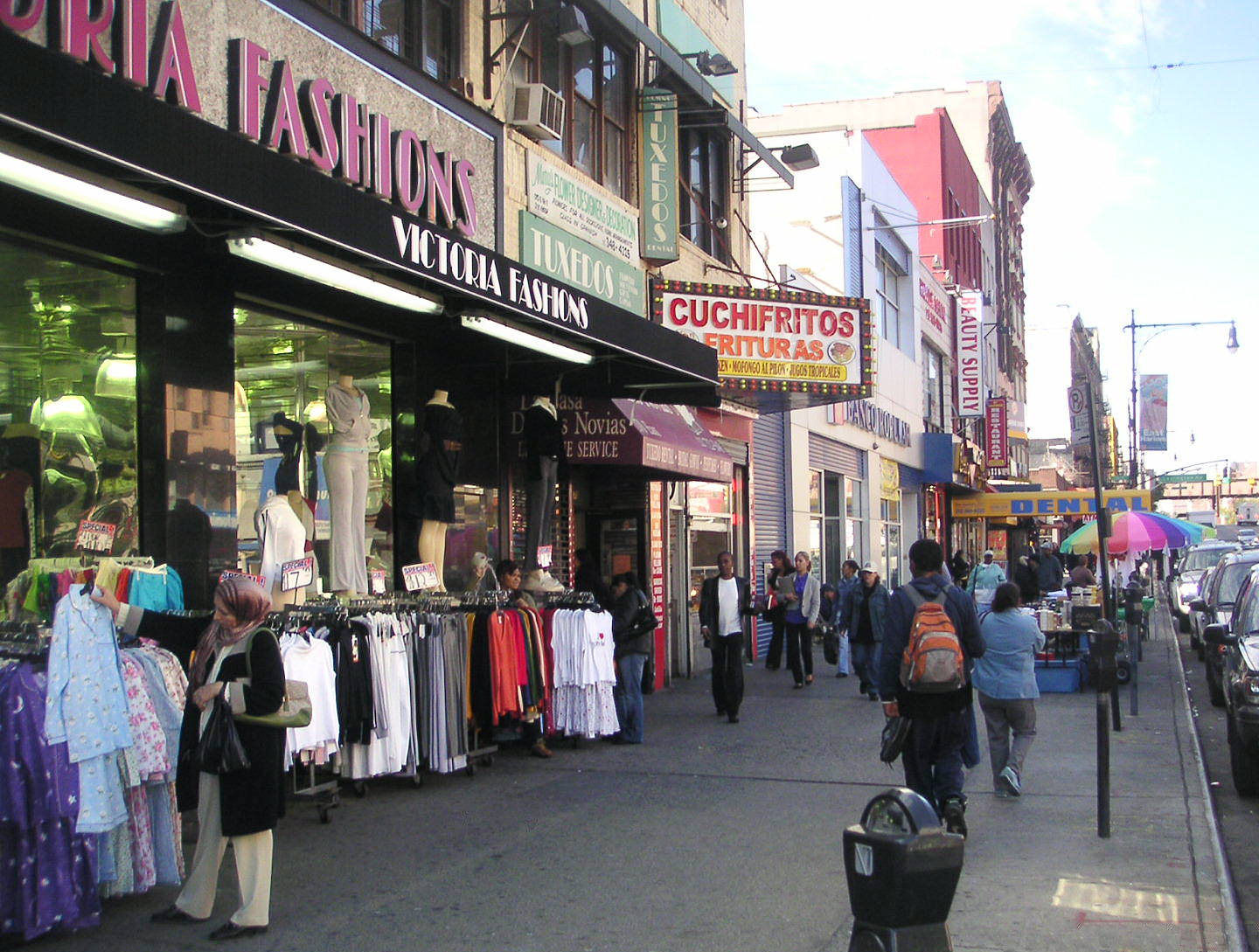
Storefronts at Lexington Avenue and 116th Street

The New York City Department of City Planning classifies East Harlem into two neighborhood tabulation areas: East Harlem North and East Harlem South, divided along 115th Street. The two areas had a combined population of 115,921, an increase of 1,874 (1.4%) from the combined 114,047 in the 2000 Census.

=== 2010 census ===
Based on data from the 2010 United States census, the population of East Harlem North was 58,019, an increase of 871 (1.5%) from the 57,148 counted in 2000. Covering an area of 573.94 acres (232.27 ha), the neighborhood had a population density of 101.1/acre (64,700/sq mi; 25,000/km^{2}). The racial makeup of the neighborhood was 6.8% (3,936) White, 35.5% (20,625) African American, 0.2% (128) Native American, 3.0% (1,766) Asian, 0.0% (9) Pacific Islander, 0.3% (185) from other races, and 1.3% (769) from two or more races. Hispanic or Latino of any race were 52.7% (30,601) of the population.

Based on data from the 2010 Census, the population of East Harlem South was 57,902, an increase of 1,003 (1.8%) from the 56,899 counted in 2000. Covering an area of 389.41 acres (157.59 ha), the neighborhood had a population density of 148.7/acre (95,200/sq mi; 36,700/km^{2}). The racial makeup of the neighborhood was 17.4% (10,072) White, 24.6% (14,227) African American, 0.2% (96) Native American, 8.3% (4,802) Asian, 0.1% (55) Pacific Islander, 0.4% (218) from other races, and 1.6% (933) from two or more races. Hispanic or Latino of any race were 47.5% (27,499) of the population.

The most significant changes in the racial composition of East Harlem between 2000 and 2010 were the Asian population's increase by 109% (3,427), the White population's increase by 68% (5,689), and the Black population's decrease by 12% (4,625). Although more of the influx of Asian and White residents was in East Harlem South, the greatest percentage growth was in East Harlem North, while the Black population's decrease was evenly split. The Hispanic/Latino population also decreased by 4% (2,485), a decrease almost entirely concentrated in East Harlem South, where it fell from being the majority group to the plurality group. The small population of other races experienced a slight increase of 5% (132).

The entirety of Manhattan Community District 11, which consists of East Harlem, Randall's Island, and Ward's Island, had 124,323 inhabitants as of NYC Health's 2018 Community Health Profile, with an average life expectancy of 77.3 years. This is 3.9 years lower than the median life expectancy of 81.2 for all New York City neighborhoods. Most residents are children and middle-aged adults: 21% are between the ages of 0–17, while 33% are between 25 and 44, and 23% are between 45 and 64. The ratio of college-aged and elderly residents was lower, at 10% and 13% respectively.

As of 2017, the median household income in Community District 11 was $36,770. In 2018, an estimated 23% of Community District 11 residents lived in poverty, compared to 14% in all of Manhattan and 20% in all of New York City. One in nine residents (11%) were unemployed, compared to 7% in Manhattan and 9% in New York City. Rent burden, or the percentage of residents who have difficulty paying their rent, is 48% in Community District 11, compared to the boroughwide and citywide rates of 45% and 51% respectively. Based on this calculation, as of 2018, Community District 11 was considered to be gentrifying: according to the Community Health Profile, the district was low-income in 1990 and has seen above-median rent growth up to 2010.

=== 2020s census ===
In the 2020 census report, East Harlem's demographics were separated into north and south parts. North East Harlem had between 30,000 and 39,999 Hispanic residents, 20,000 to 29,999 Black residents, 5,000 to 9,999 White residents, and less than 5000 Asian residents. Meanwhile, South East Harlem was more racially diverse with 20,000 to 29,999 Hispanic residents, 10,000 to 19,999 Black residents, 10,000 to 19,999 white residents, and 5,000 to 9,999 Asian residents.

=== Ethnic groups ===
Community District 11 is a mostly low to middle income area. It is made up of first and second generation Puerto Ricans, Dominican Americans, Cuban Americans, African Americans, Italian Americans, Asian Americans, Caribbean Americans and a growing population of Mexican Americans and Salvadoran Americans and other Central American immigrants. It has one of the highest concentrations of Puerto Ricans in all of New York City. As of 2010, the Puerto Rican population was 27.7% in zip code 10029, and 23.4% in 10035. 10035 also has a large Mexican population, at 10.7%.

==== Asian residents ====
The number of Asians in East Harlem more than doubled between 2000 and 2010, largely due to Chinese people moving to East Harlem. Increasing rents in Lower Manhattan's Chinatown and the city's other Chinatowns led many Chinese New Yorkers to apply for various affordable housing programs; some applicants were given units in East Harlem after their housing applications were approved. Mitchell Lama's Franklin Plaza in the neighborhood has been well reported with having an influx of Chinese residents. Advocates have been calling for Chinese language services to be available in the community centers to accommodate the growing number of Chinese residents in the area. In 2000, the Chinese population in the northern portion was less than one percent, but by 2010, it has gone up to three percent. In the southern part, it rose from 4.6% to 8.4%. Although their population is still very small in the district, they have gotten a lot media attention over their presence in the area's affordable housing developments.

Elderly Asian residents have reported feeling isolated in East Harlem due to their limited English proficiency and lack of resources. Some of the Asian residents have experienced racially motivated harassment; for example, Chinese American senior Yao Pan Ma was beaten to death in East Harlem in 2021. In 2023, a New York University journalist conducted an interview with the Chinese speaking elders living in New York City Housing Authority (NYCHA)'s George Washington Carver Houses reflecting on the difficulties they experienced in East Harlem.

=== Social issues ===
Social problems, including concentrated poverty, homelessness, overcrowding, substandard housing, language barriers, food insecurity, teen pregnancy, obesity, crime, drug addiction, dropping out of school, and low rates of advanced educational attainment, have long plagued the area. Although crime rates have dropped from the historically high numbers during the crack epidemic, East Harlem suffers from a high violent crime rate, especially in the 25th Precinct above 115th Street. In 2021, the 25th Precinct had the second-highest rates of felony assault and robbery, the 16th-highest rate of rape, and the highest rate of murder out of the New York Police Department's 77 precincts.

East Harlem has the highest concentration of shelters and facilities in Manhattan, with eight homeless shelters, 36 drug and alcohol treatment facilities and 37 mental health treatment facilities. It also has the highest jobless rate in the entire city, as well as the city's second-highest cumulative AIDS rate. The asthma rate is also five times higher than national levels. The neighborhood also suffers from a high poverty rate. Union Settlement Association is one of the neighborhood's largest social service agencies, reaching more than 13,000 people annually at 17 locations throughout East Harlem, through a range of programs, including early childhood education, youth development, senior services, job training, the arts, adult education, nutrition, counseling, a farmers' market, community development, and neighborhood cultural events.

== Housing ==
East Harlem is dominated by public housing complexes of various types, with a high concentration of older tenement buildings between these developments. The neighborhood contains the second-highest concentration of public housing in the United States, behind Brownsville, Brooklyn. The total land area is 1.54 sq mi (4.0 km^{2}).

After a wave of arson ravaged the low income communities of New York City throughout the 1970s, many of the residential structures in East Harlem were left seriously damaged or destroyed. By the late 1970s, the city began to rehabilitate many abandoned tenement style buildings and designate them as low income housing. Despite recent gentrification of the neighborhood, large numbers of apartment buildings have been deliberately kept vacant by their owners. Although the businesses on the ground floor are retained, landlords do not want to have the trouble involved in residential tenants. In some cases, landlords are waiting for a revived economy, warehousing the apartments so that they can rent them later at a higher rent.

In 2007, a survey of Manhattan's buildings found that 1,723 were significantly vacant, three-quarters of them north of 96th Street. A 1998 survey found that one-quarter of low-rise residential buildings on avenues or major cross streets in East Harlem had sealed-up residential floors, despite having commercial businesses on the ground floor.

=== Public housing projects ===
There are 24 New York City Housing Authority developments located in East Harlem. As of 2013, 93.6% of all housing units were renter-occupied, and over 25% of the population resided in public housing units managed by the NYCHA.

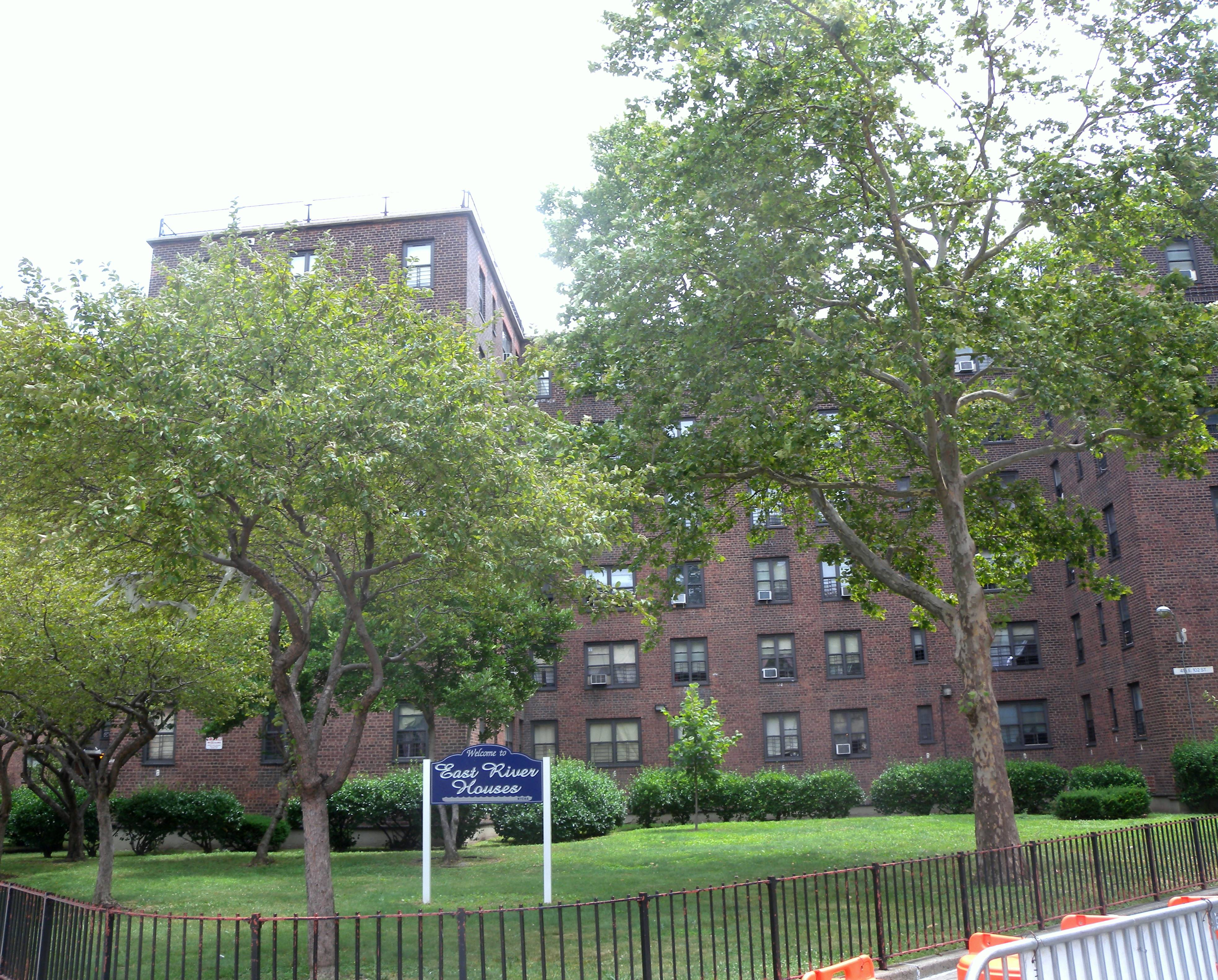
East River Houses

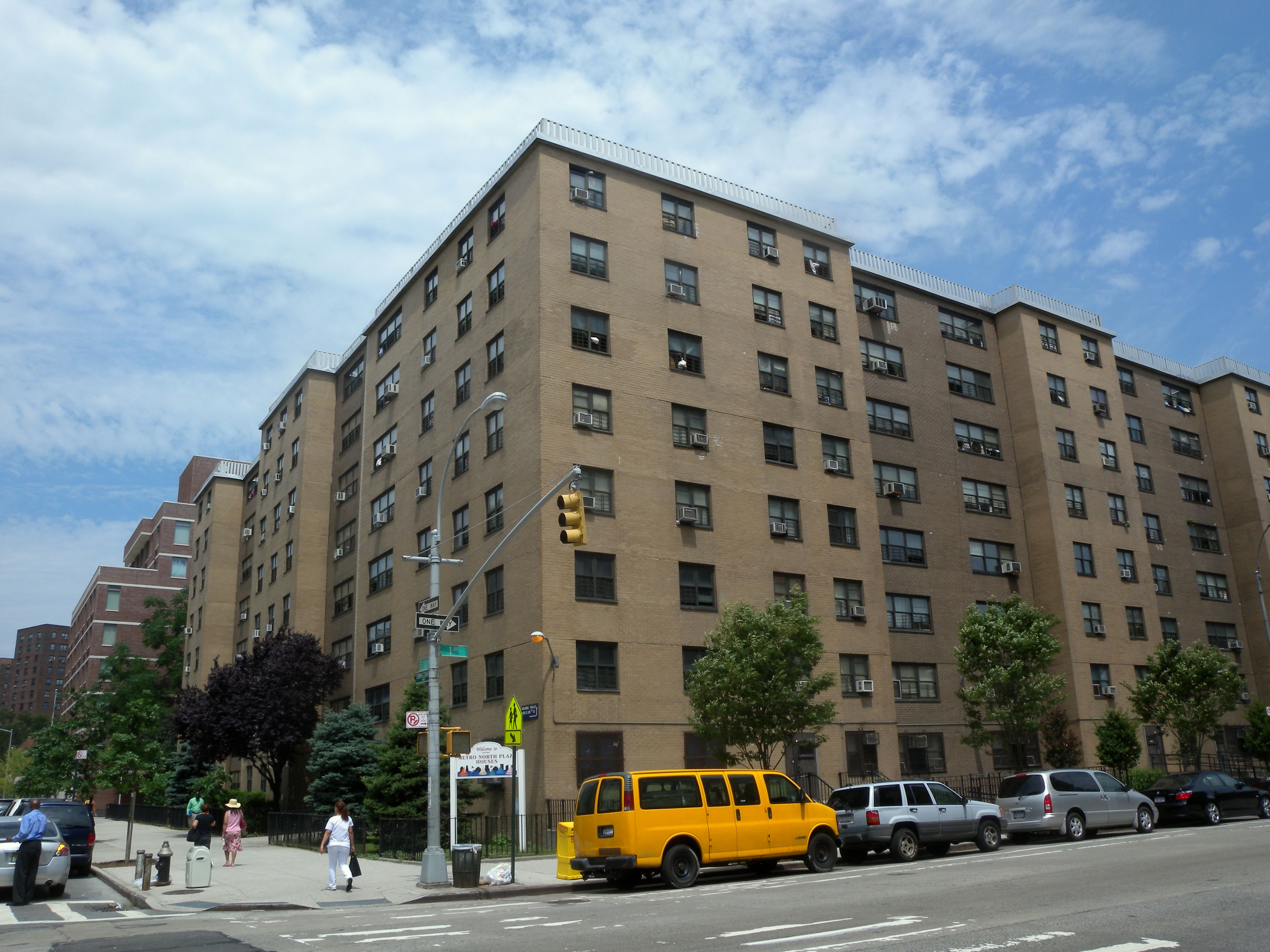
Metro North Plaza Houses

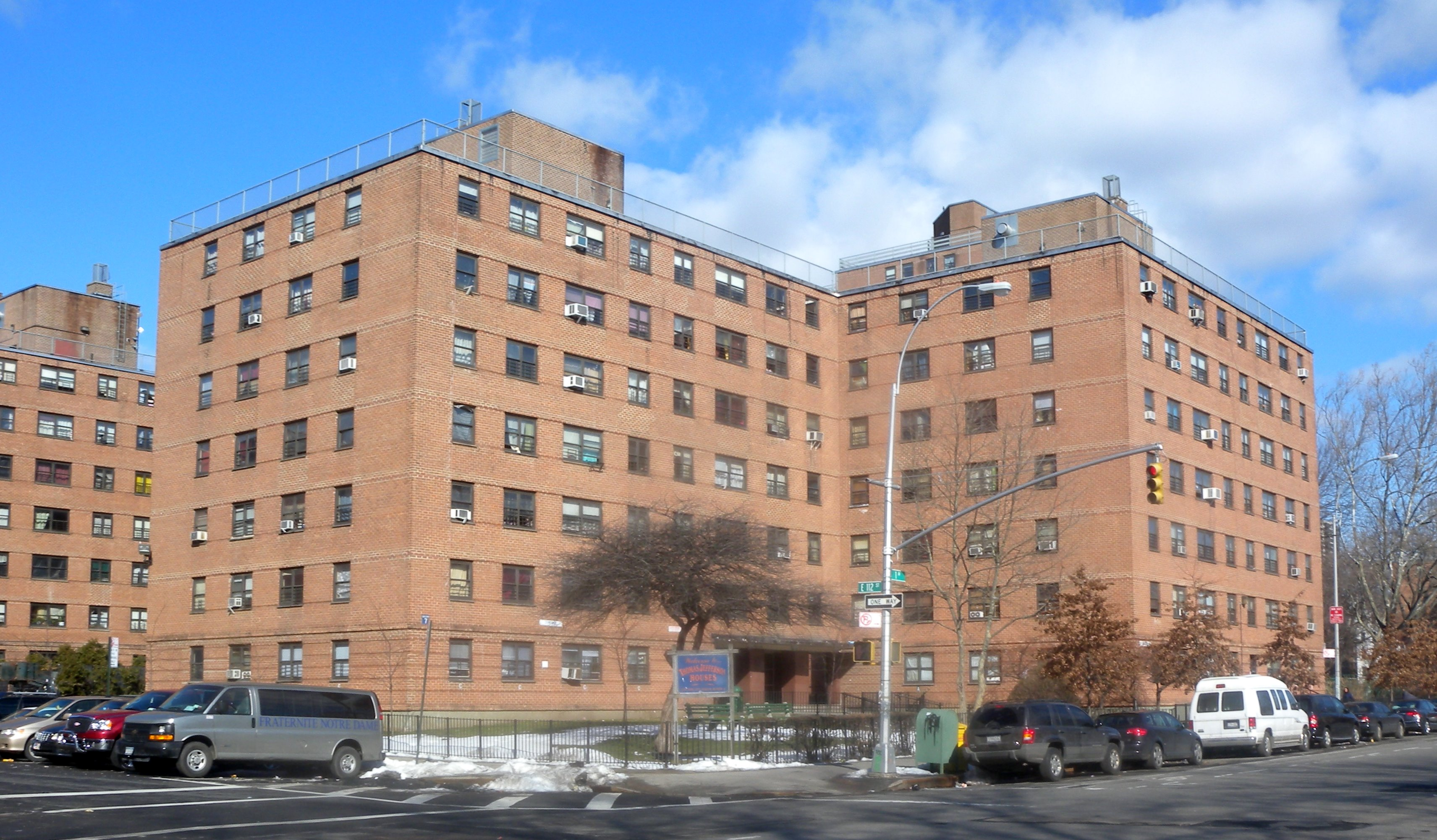
Jefferson Houses

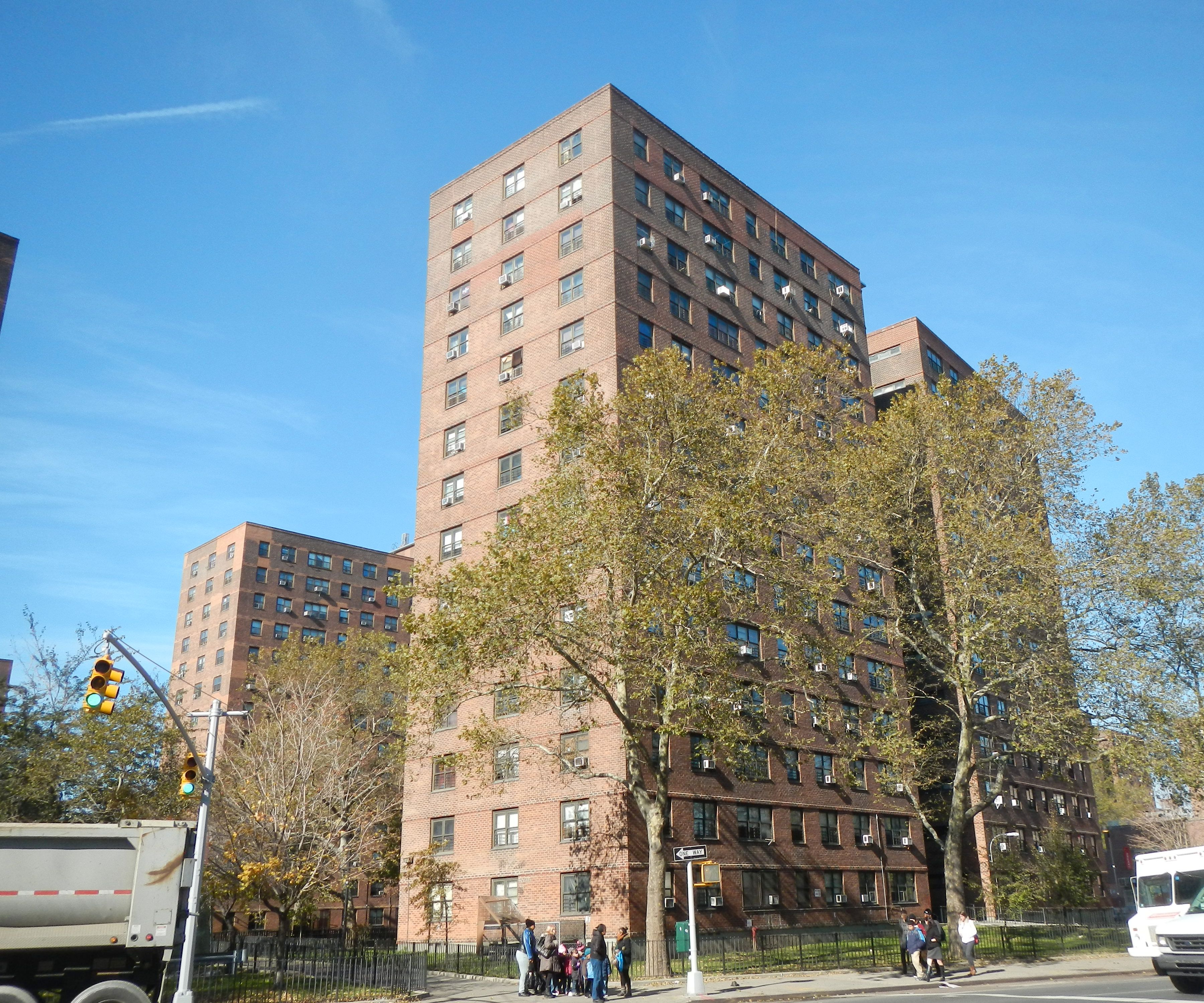
Washington Houses

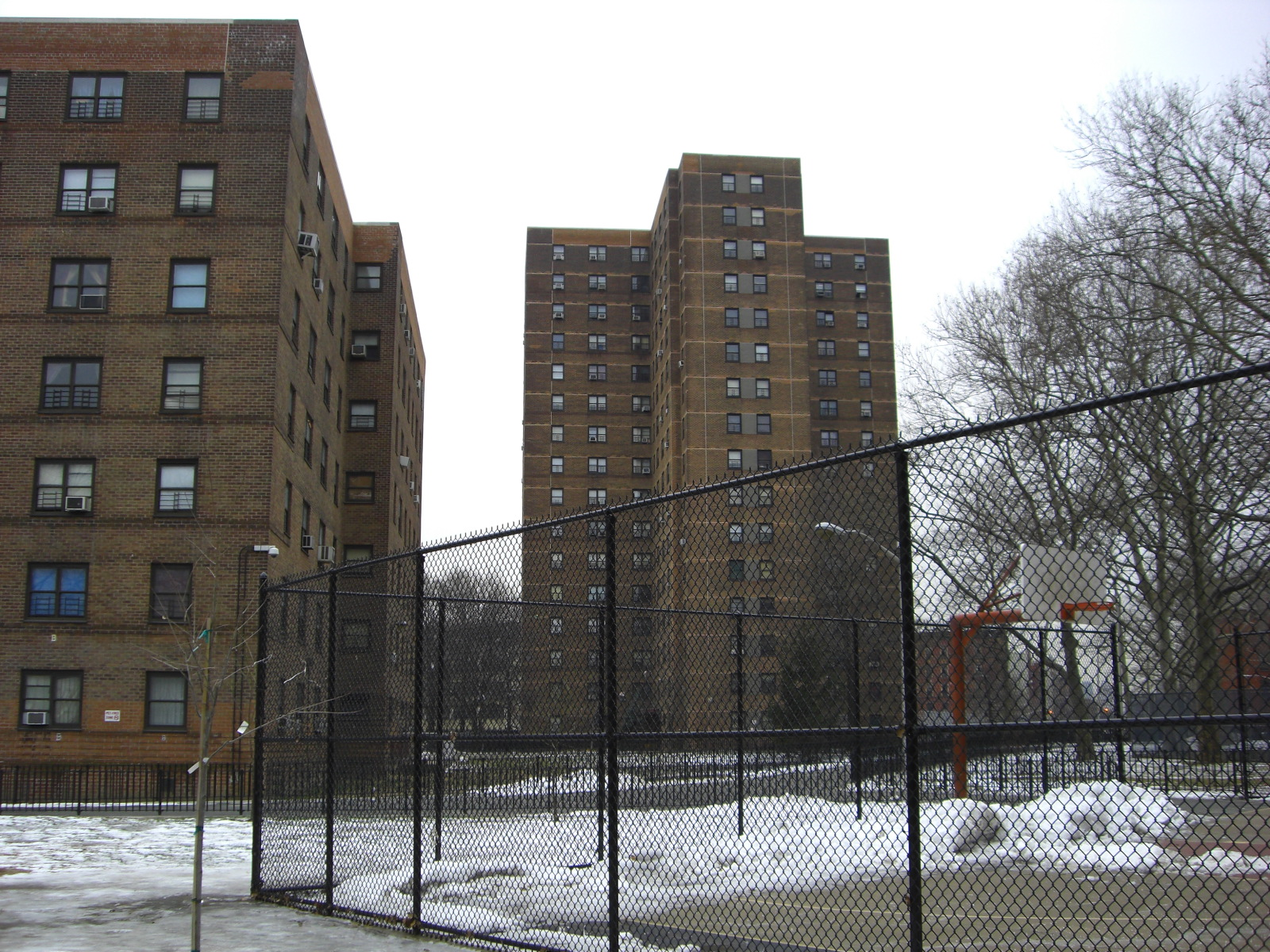
Wagner Houses

- 335 East 111th Street; one 6-story building
- East 120th Street Rehab; one 6-story rehabilitated tenement building
- East River Houses; 10 buildings, 6, 10m and 11 stories tall
- Edward Corsi Houses; one 16-story building
- Gaylord White Houses; one 20-story building
- George Washington Carver Houses; 13 buildings, 6 and 15 stories tall
- Governor Dewitt Clinton Houses; six buildings, 9 and 18 stories tall
- Jackie Robinson Houses; one 8-story building
- James Weldon Johnson Houses; 10 14-story buildings
- Lehman Village; four 20-story buildings
- Lexington Houses; four 14-story buildings
- Metro North Plaza; three buildings, 7, 8, and 11 stories tall
- Metro North Rehab; 17 6-story rehabilitated tenement buildings
- Milbank-Frawley; two rehabilitated tenement buildings 5 and 6 stories tall
- Morris Park Senior Citizens Home; one 9-story rehabilitated building
- Park Avenue-East 122nd Street, 123rd Streets; two 6-story buildings
- President Abraham Lincoln; 14 buildings, 6 and 14 stories tall
- President George Washington Houses; 14 buildings, 12 and 14 stories tall
- President Thomas Jefferson Houses; 18 buildings, 7, 13 and 14 stories tall
- President Woodrow Wilson Houses; three 20-story buildings
- Senator Robert A. Taft Houses; nine 19-story buildings
- Robert F. Wagner Houses; 22 buildings, 7 and 16 stories tall
- U.P.A.C.A. (Upper Park Avenue Community Association) Site 6; one 12-story building
- U.P.A.C.A. (Upper Park Avenue Community Association) U.R.A. Site 5; one 11-story building

=== Other residential developments ===
Other subsidized housing includes:

- Taino Towers – East 122nd Street and Third Avenue. Four 35-story towers, 656 apartments. Opened in 1979.
- A new 68-story rental tower at 321 East 96th Street was approved in August 2017. The 1,300,000 sq ft (120,000 m^{2}) building, which is currently the site of the School of Cooperative Technical Education, would house three schools and retail space along with a mix of 1,100 affordable and market-rate apartments.

== Economy ==
The neighborhood is home to one of the few major television studios north of midtown, Metropolis at 106th Street and Park Avenue, where shows such as BET's 106 & Park and Chappelle's Show have been produced. PRdream.com, a web site on the history and culture of Puerto Ricans, founded a media gallery and digital film studio called MediaNoche in 2003. It presents technology-based art on Park Avenue and 102nd Street, providing exhibition space and residencies for artists and filmmakers, and webcasting events.

== Police and crime ==
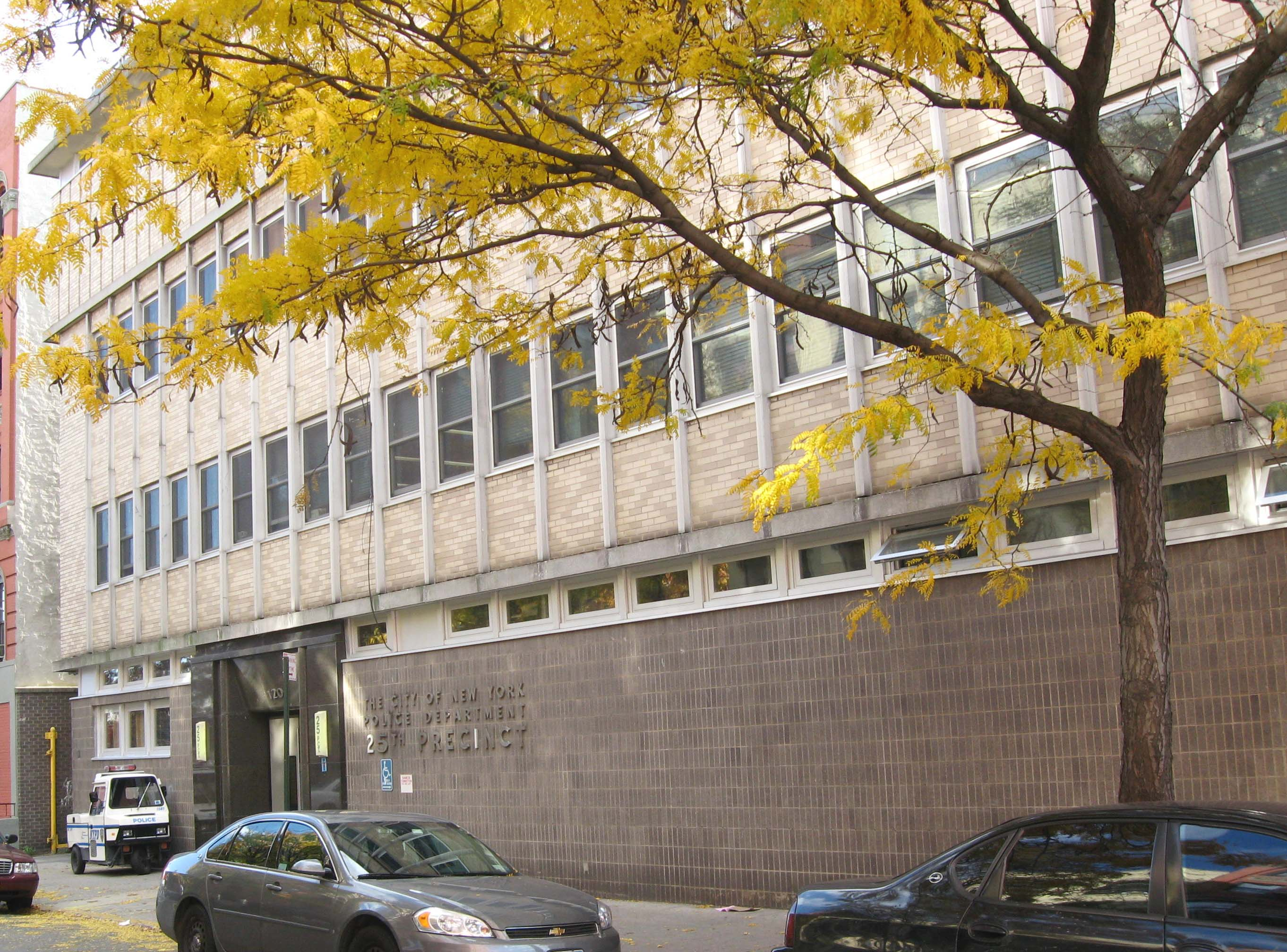
NYPD's 25th Precinct station house

East Harlem is served by two precincts of the New York City Police Department (NYPD). The area north of 116th Street is served by the 25th Precinct, located at 120 East 119th Street, while the area south of 116th Street is served by the 23rd Precinct, located at 164 East 102nd Street.

The 25th Precinct has a lower crime rate than in the 1990s, with crimes across all categories having decreased by 72.1% between 1990 and 2024. The precinct reported 8 murders, 16 rapes, 257 robberies, 478 felony assaults, 108 burglaries, 490 grand larcenies, and 109 grand larcenies auto in 2024. Of the five major violent felonies (murder, rape, felony assault, robbery, and burglary), the 25th Precinct had a rate of 1,340 crimes per 100,000 residents in 2019, compared to the boroughwide average of 632 crimes per 100,000 and the citywide average of 572 crimes per 100,000.

The 23rd Precinct also has a lower crime rate than in the 1990s, with crimes across all categories having decreased by 63.1% between 1990 and 2024. The precinct reported 7 murders, 21 rapes, 250 robberies, 484 felony assaults, 157 burglaries, 374 grand larcenies, and 85 grand larcenies auto in 2024. Of the five major violent felonies (murder, rape, felony assault, robbery, and burglary), the 23rd Precinct had a rate of 819 crimes per 100,000 residents in 2019, compared to the boroughwide average of 632 crimes per 100,000 and the citywide average of 572 crimes per 100,000.

As of 2018, Community District 11 has a non-fatal assault hospitalization rate of 130 per 100,000 people, compared to the boroughwide rate of 49 per 100,000 and the citywide rate of 59 per 100,000. Its incarceration rate is 1,291 per 100,000 people, compared to the boroughwide rate of 407 per 100,000 and the citywide rate of 425 per 100,000.

In 2019, the highest concentration of felony assaults in East Harlem was around the intersection of 125th Street and Lexington Avenue, where there were 39 felony assaults. This location is well known as an open-air drug market and hotspot of other crimes. The highest concentration of robberies, on the other hand, was around the intersection of 116th Street and Third Avenue, where there were 21 robberies. The Willis Avenue Bridge which connects East Harlem to the Mott Haven section of the Bronx has long been a hotspot for robbery.

== Fire safety ==
East Harlem is served by four New York City Fire Department (FDNY) fire stations:

- Engine Company 35/Ladder Company 14/Battalion 12 – 2282 Third Avenue
- Engine Company 53/Ladder Company 43 – 1836 Third Avenue
- Engine Company 58/Ladder Company 26 – 1367 Fifth Avenue
- Engine Company 91 – 242 East 111th Street

== Health ==
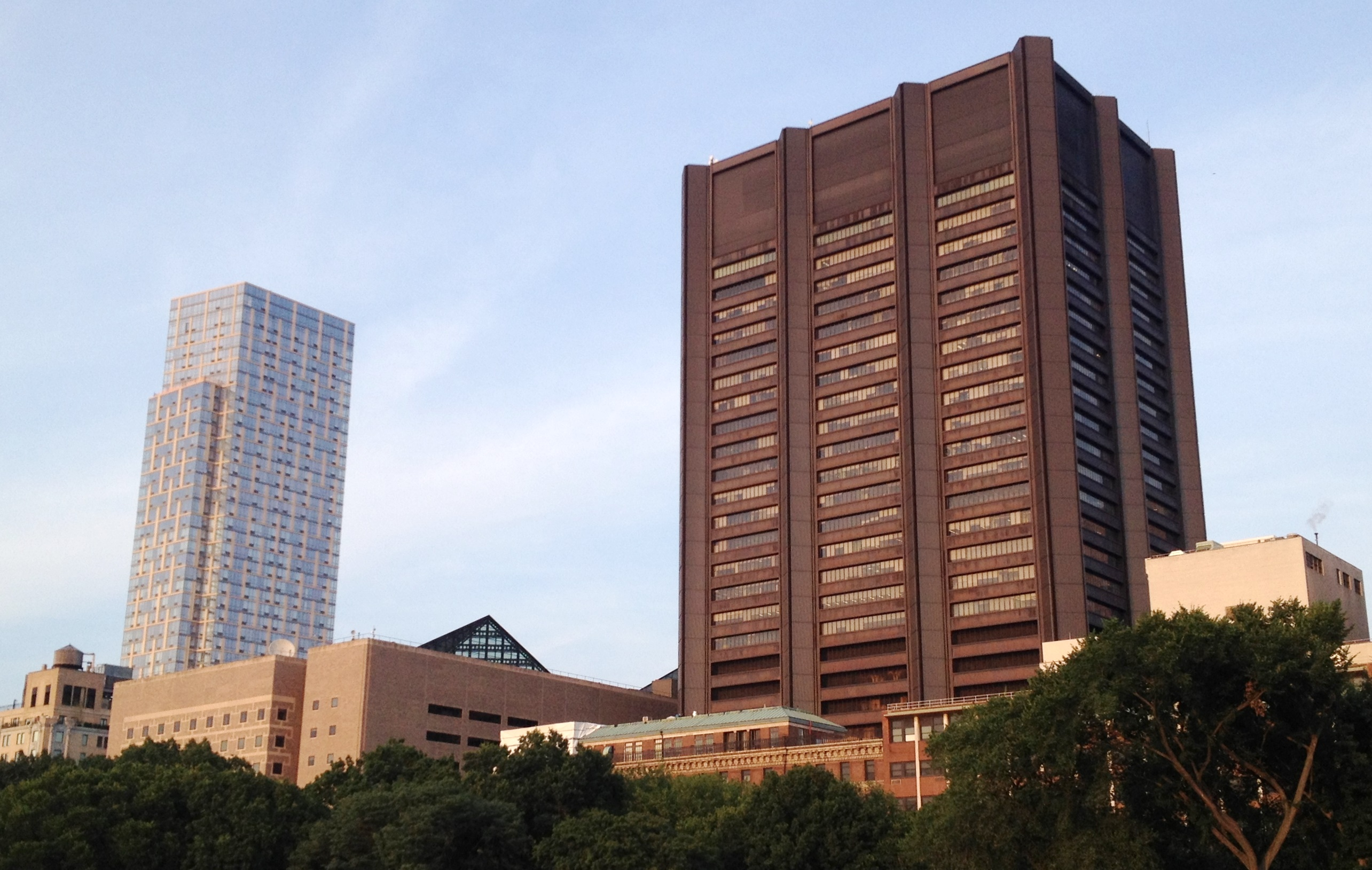
Mount Sinai Medical Center as seen from Central Park

As of 2018, preterm births and births to teenage mothers in East Harlem are higher than the city average. In East Harlem, there were 108 preterm births per 1,000 live births (compared to 87 per 1,000 citywide), and 10.8 teenage births per 1,000 live births (compared to 19.3 per 1,000 citywide), though the teenage birth rate was based on a small sample size. East Harlem has a low population of residents who are uninsured. In 2018, this population of uninsured residents was estimated to be 3%, less than the citywide rate of 12%, though this was based on a small sample size.

The concentration of fine particulate matter, the deadliest type of air pollutant, in East Harlem is 0.0082 mg/m^{3} (8.2×10^{−9} oz/ft^{3}), more than the city average. Eighteen percent of East Harlem residents are smokers, which is more than the city average of 14% of residents being smokers. In East Harlem, 28% of residents are obese, 17% are diabetic, and 34% have high blood pressure—compared to the citywide averages of 24%, 11%, and 28% respectively. In addition, 23% of children are obese, compared to the citywide average of 20%.

Eighty-four percent of residents eat some fruits and vegetables every day, which is lower than the city's average of 87%. In 2018, 76% of residents described their health as "good", "very good", or "excellent", less than the city's average of 78%. For every supermarket in East Harlem, there are 17 bodegas.

Metropolitan Hospital Center and Mount Sinai Hospital are both located in southern East Harlem. North General Hospital, which formerly served the area as well, is now closed. In addition, FDNY EMS Station 10 is located close to Metropolitan Hospital Center.

=== Fresh food ===
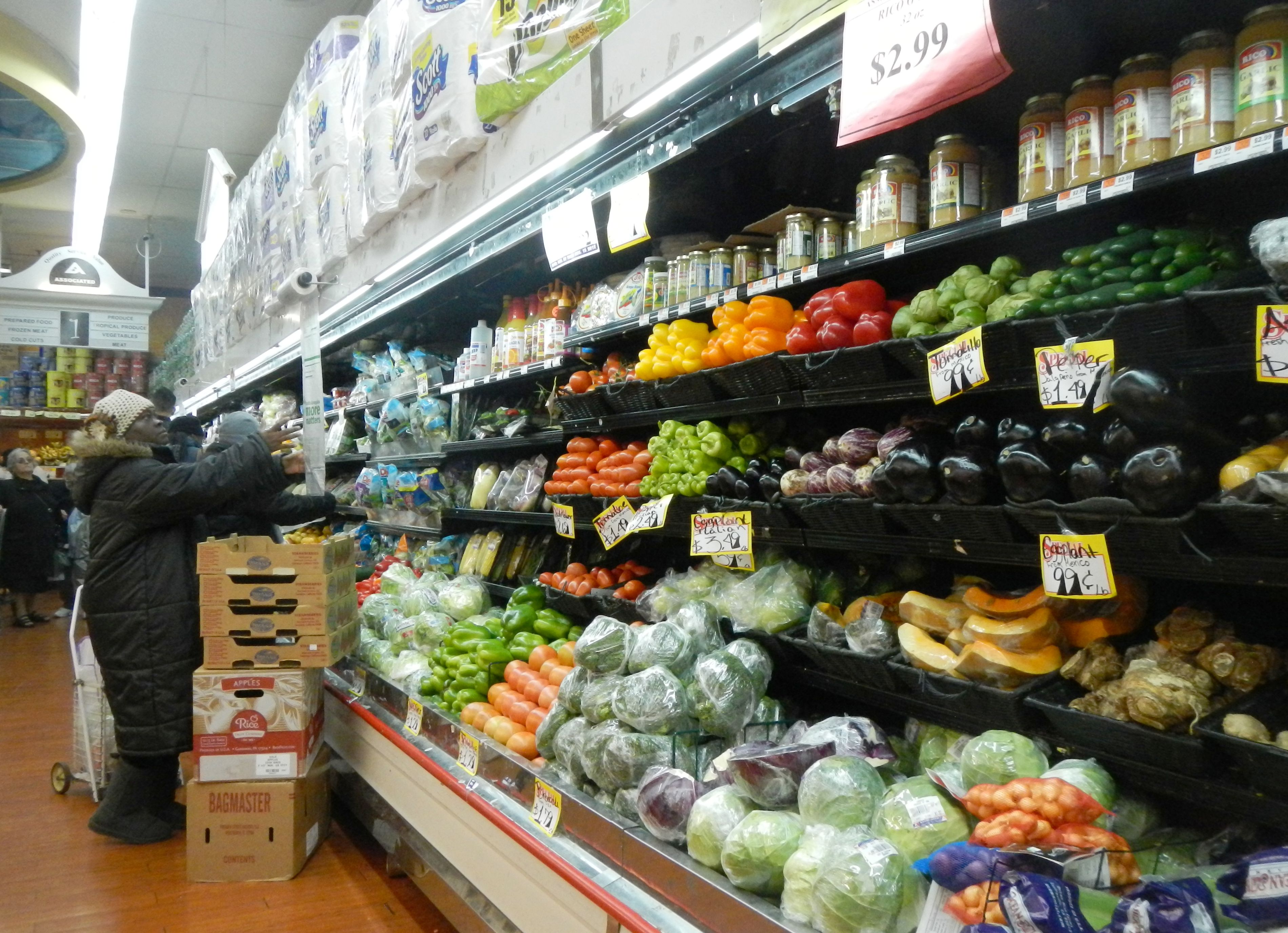
Associated Supermarkets on East 101st Street

A lack of access to healthy food causes serious hardships to citizens of East Harlem, a neighborhood which is considered to be a food desert. According to an April 2008 report prepared by the New York City Department of City Planning, East Harlem is an area of the city with the highest levels of diet-related diseases due to limited opportunities for citizens to purchase fresh foods.

With a high population density and a lack of nearby supermarkets, the neighborhood has little access to fresh fruit and vegetables and a low consumption of fresh foods. Citizens of East Harlem are likely to buy food from grocery stores that have a limited supply of fruits and vegetables, which are often of poor quality and generally more expensive than the same products sold at supermarkets. Compared to the Upper East Side, supermarkets in Harlem are 30% less common. Without access to affordable produce and meats, East Harlem residents have difficulty eating a healthy diet, which contributes to high rates of obesity and diabetes.

In 2011, Manhattan Borough President Scott Stringer announced a program which would send Veggie Vans to East Harlem senior centers and housing projects. In 2012, Whole Foods announced two uptown locations, one being on 125th Street and Lenox Avenue, the other on the Upper East Side. In 2010, Aldi's Grocery opened at the East River Plaza located at E. 117th St. and the FDR Drive, providing access to affordable food for East Harlem's residents. In 2013, a new Super FI Emperior Grocery store opened up in East Harlem on 103rd Street and Lexington Avenue.

== Politics ==
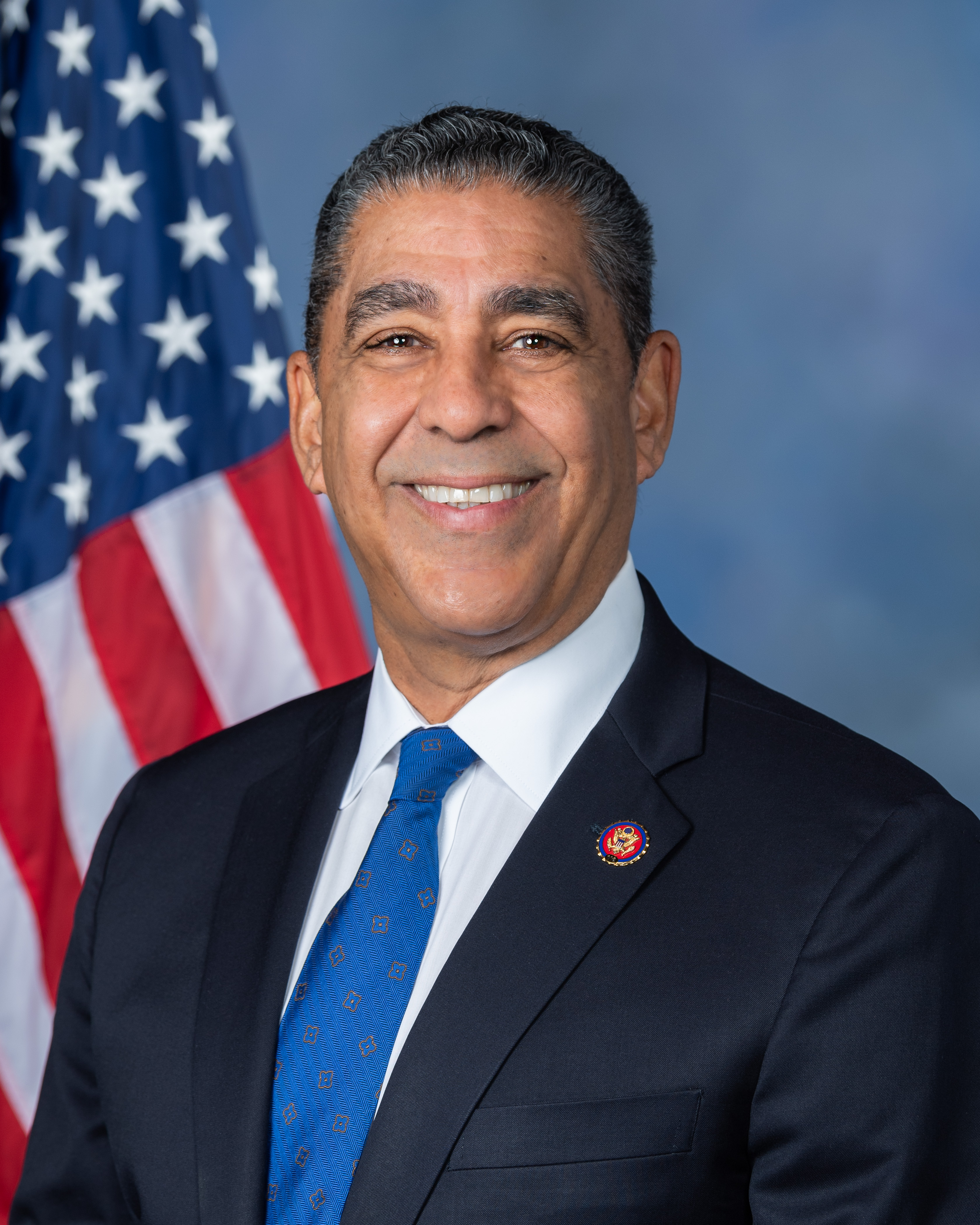
Adriano Espaillat

Politically, East Harlem is in New York's 13th congressional district for the U.S. House of Representatives, represented by Democrat Adriano Espaillat since 2017. On the state level, it is in the New York State Senate's 30th district, represented by Democrat Cordell Cleare, and the New York State Assembly's 68th district represented by Democrat Edward "Eddie" Gibbs. On the city level, it is In the New York City Council's 8th district, represented by Democrat Elsie Encarnacion.

== Post offices and ZIP Codes ==
East Harlem is located in two primary ZIP Codes. The area south of 116th Street is part of 10029 and the area north of 116th Street is part of 10035. The extreme northwestern portion of East Harlem is also located in 10037. The United States Postal Service operates two post offices near East Harlem:

- Hellgate Station – 153 East 110th Street
- Triborough Finance New Station – 118 East 124th Street

== Education ==
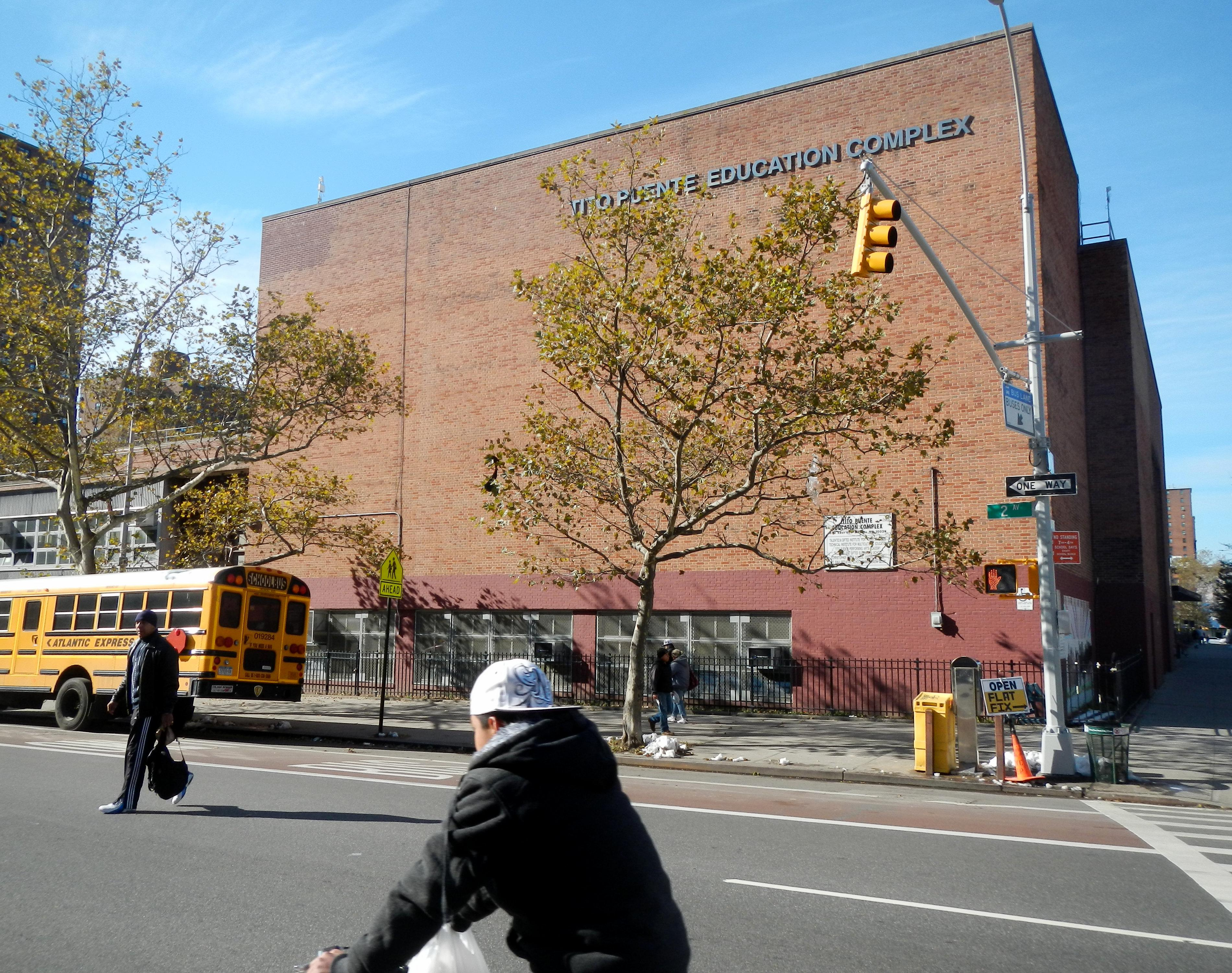
A school named after musician Tito Puente

East Harlem generally has a lower rate of college-educated residents than the rest of the city as of 2018. While 38% have a college education or higher, 25% have less than a high school education and 37% are high school graduates or have some college education. By contrast, 64% of Manhattan residents and 43% of city residents have a college education or higher. The percentage of East Harlem students excelling in math rose from 25% in 2000 to 51% in 2011, and reading achievement increased from 33% to 39% during the same time period.

East Harlem's rate of elementary school student absenteeism is higher than the rest of New York City. In East Harlem, 30% of elementary school students missed 20 or more days per school year, more than the citywide average of 20%. Additionally, 67% of high school students in East Harlem graduate on time, less than the citywide average of 75%.

As in other parts of the city, some schools require students pass through metal detectors and swipe ID cards to enter school buildings.

=== Schools ===
The New York City Department of Education operates public schools in East Harlem as part of Community School District 2. The following public elementary schools are located in East Harlem:

- Central Park East I (grades PK–5)
- Central Park East II (grades PK–8)
- James Weldon Johnson School (grades PK–8)
- Mosaic Preparatory Academy (grades PK–5)
- PS 7 Samuel Stern (grades PK–8)
- PS 30 Hernandez Hughes (grades PK–5)
  - PS 38 Roberto Clemente (grades PK–5)
- PS 83 Luis Munoz Rivera (grades PK–5)
- PS 96 Joseph Lanzetta (grades PK–8)
- PS 102 Jacques Cartier (grades PK–5)
- PS 108 Assemblyman Angelo Del Toro Educational Com (grades PK–8)
- PS 112 Jose Celso Barbosa (grades PK–2)
- PS 133 Fred R Moore (grades PK–5)
- PS 138 (grades K-12)
- PS 155 William Paca (grades PK–5)
- PS 171 Patrick Henry (grades PK–8)
- PS/MS 206 Jose Celso Barbosa (grades 3–8)
- River East Elementary School (grades PK–5)
- Tag Young Scholars (grades K–8)
- The Bilingual Bicultural School (grades PK–5)
- The Lexington Academy (grades PK–8)

The following public middle schools are located in East Harlem:

- Esperanza Preparatory Academy (grades 6–12)
- Isaac Newton MS For Math And Science (grades 6–8)
- MS 224 Manhattan East School For Arts And Academy (grades 6–8)
- Renaissance School of the Arts (grades 6–8)
- Young Women's Leadership School, East Harlem (grades 6–12)

The following public high schools are located in East Harlem:

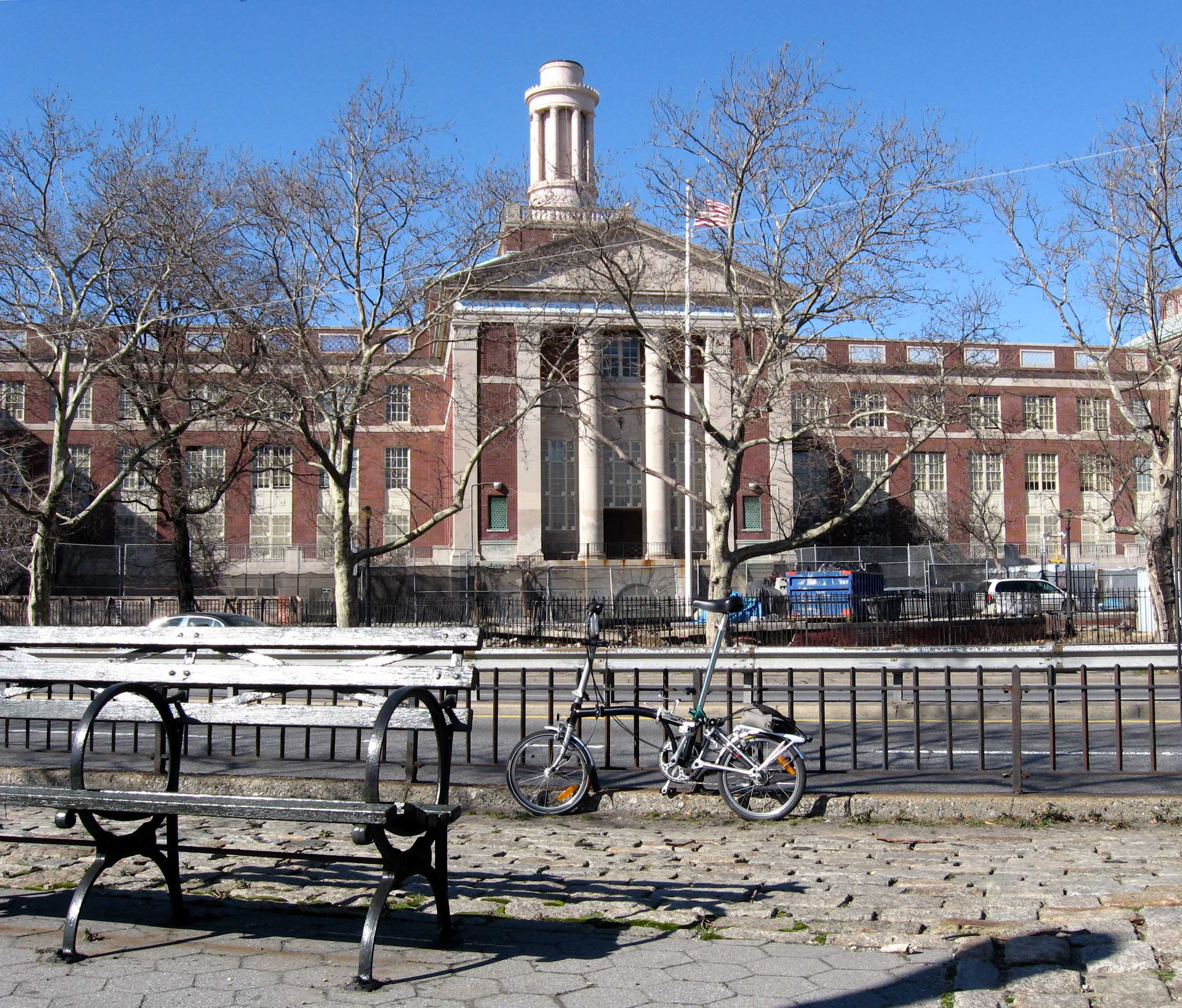
Manhattan Center for Science and Mathematics

- Harlem Renaissance High School (grades 9–12)
- Manhattan Center for Science and Mathematics (grades 9–12) – replaced Benjamin Franklin High School, a school which had the smallest graduating class in the city at the time of its closing.
- PS 79 Horan School (grades 6–12)
- The Heritage School (grades 9–12)

The public charter schools in East Harlem include:

- Success Academy Harlem 2 of Success Academy Charter Schools (grades K–8)
- Harlem Village Academy (grades K–9)
- East Harlem Scholars Academies (grades PK–8)
- Dream Charter School (grades PK–8)

St. Cecilia's School in East Harlem was closed by the Roman Catholic Archdiocese of New York – which operates Catholic schools in Manhattan and the Bronx – in 1991.

=== Libraries ===
The New York Public Library (NYPL) operates two branches in East Harlem:

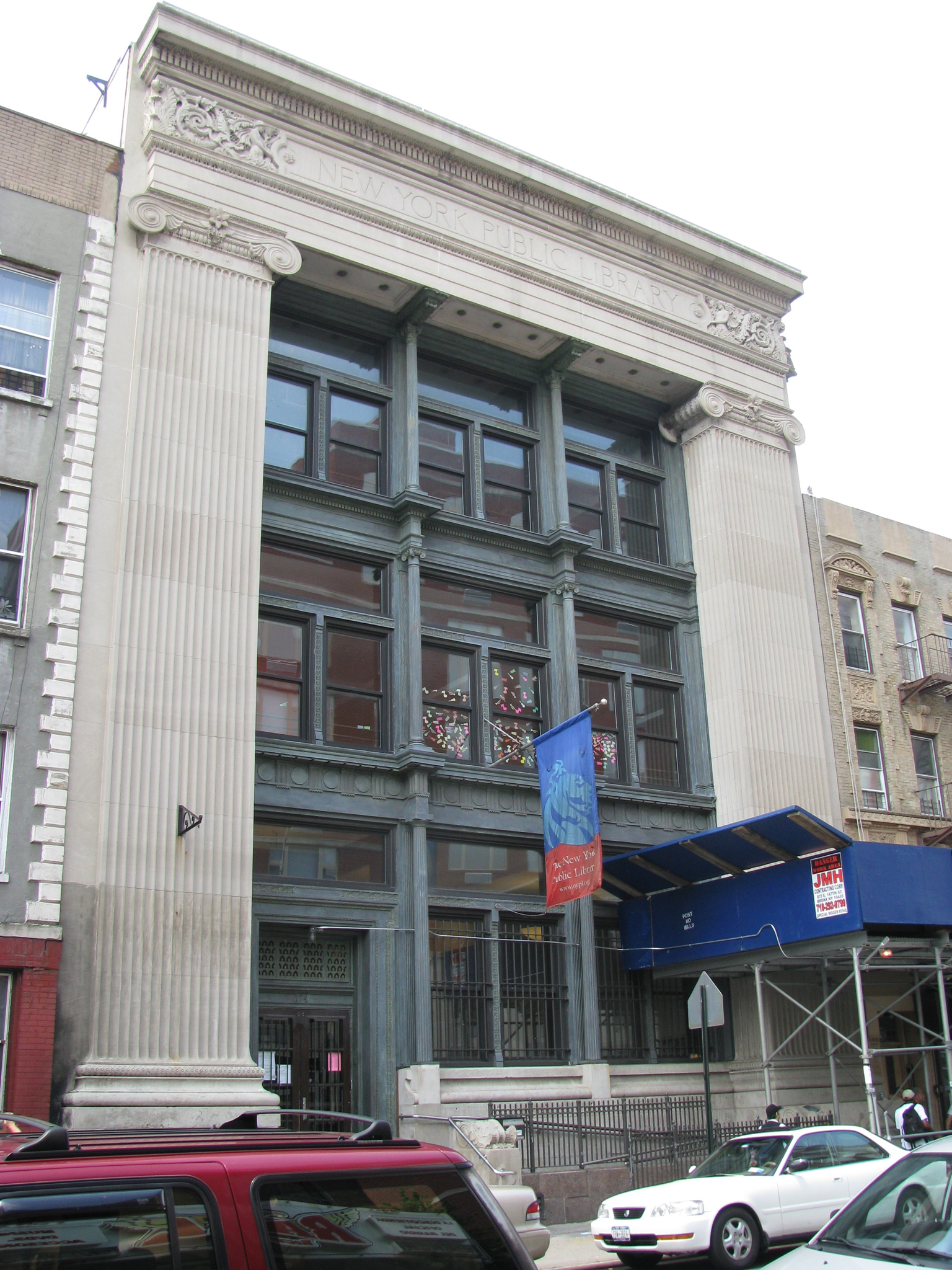
The Aguilar Library, part of the New York Public Library system

- The Aguilar branch is located at 174 East 110th Street. The three-story Carnegie library opened in 1903 and was renovated in 1996. It is named for the author Grace Aguilar.
- The 125th Street branch is located at 224 East 125th Street. The two-story Carnegie library opened in 1901 and was renovated in 2001.

Two additional NYPL branches are located nearby. The 96th Street branch is located at 112 East 96th Street, at the border with the Upper East Side, while the Harlem branch is located at 9 West 124th Street, near the border with Harlem.

== Transportation ==
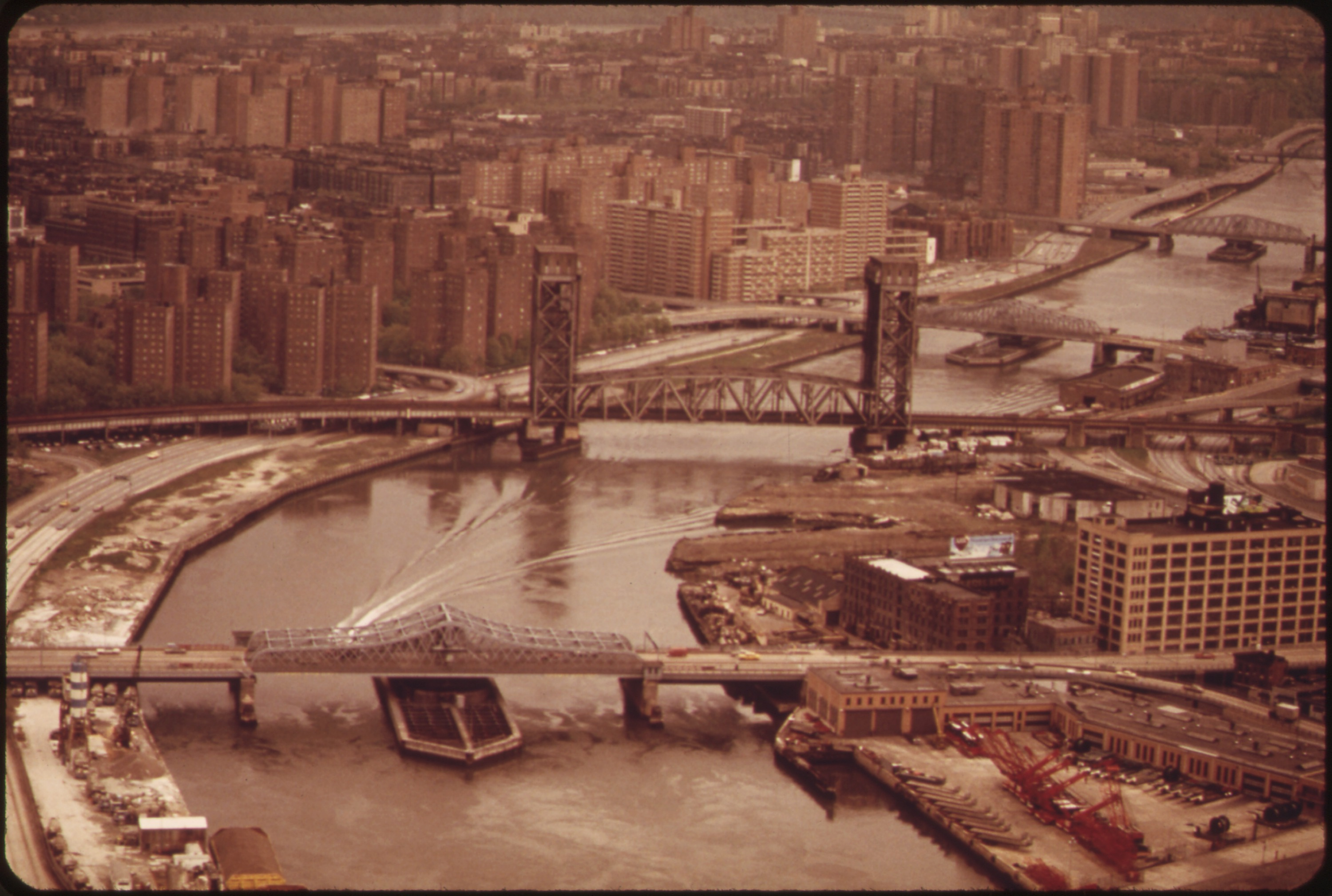
Bridges spanning the Harlem River between Harlem to the left and the Bronx to the right

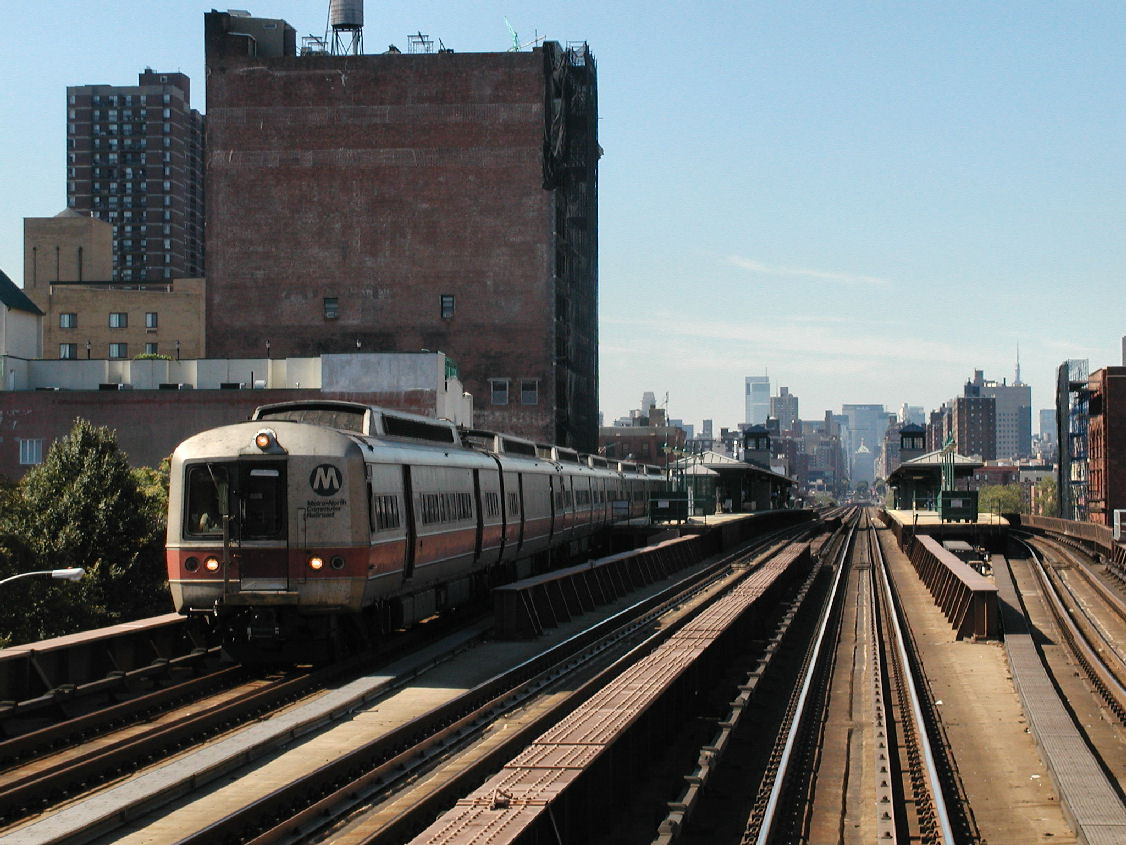
Harlem–125th Street station on the Metro-North Railroad

The Harlem River separates the Bronx and Manhattan, necessitating several spans between the two New York City boroughs. Three free bridges connect East Harlem and the Bronx: the Willis Avenue Bridge (for northbound traffic only), Third Avenue Bridge (for southbound traffic only), and Madison Avenue Bridge. In East Harlem, the Wards Island Bridge, also known as the 103rd Street Footbridge, connects Manhattan with Wards Island. The Triborough Bridge (officially the Robert F. Kennedy Bridge) is a complex of three separate bridges that offers connections between Queens, East Harlem, and the Bronx.

Public transportation service is provided by the Metropolitan Transportation Authority. The New York City Subway's IRT Lexington Avenue Line runs through East Harlem, with an express station at 125th Street (served by the 4, 5, 6, and <6> routes) as well as local stations at the 116th Street, 110th Street, 103rd Street, and 96th Street (served by the 6 and <6> routes). There is also a Second Avenue Subway station at 96th Street on the Q route. MTA Regional Bus Operations' M15, M15 SBS, M35, M60 SBS, M96, M98, M101, M102, M103, M106, M116 and M125 bus routes serve East Harlem as well. Metro-North Railroad has a commuter rail station at Harlem–125th Street, serving trains to the Lower Hudson Valley and Connecticut.

== Notable people ==
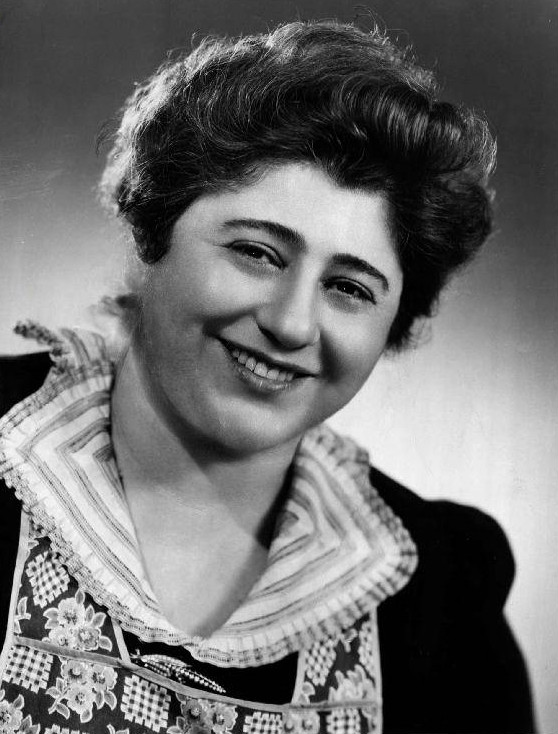
Gertrude Berg

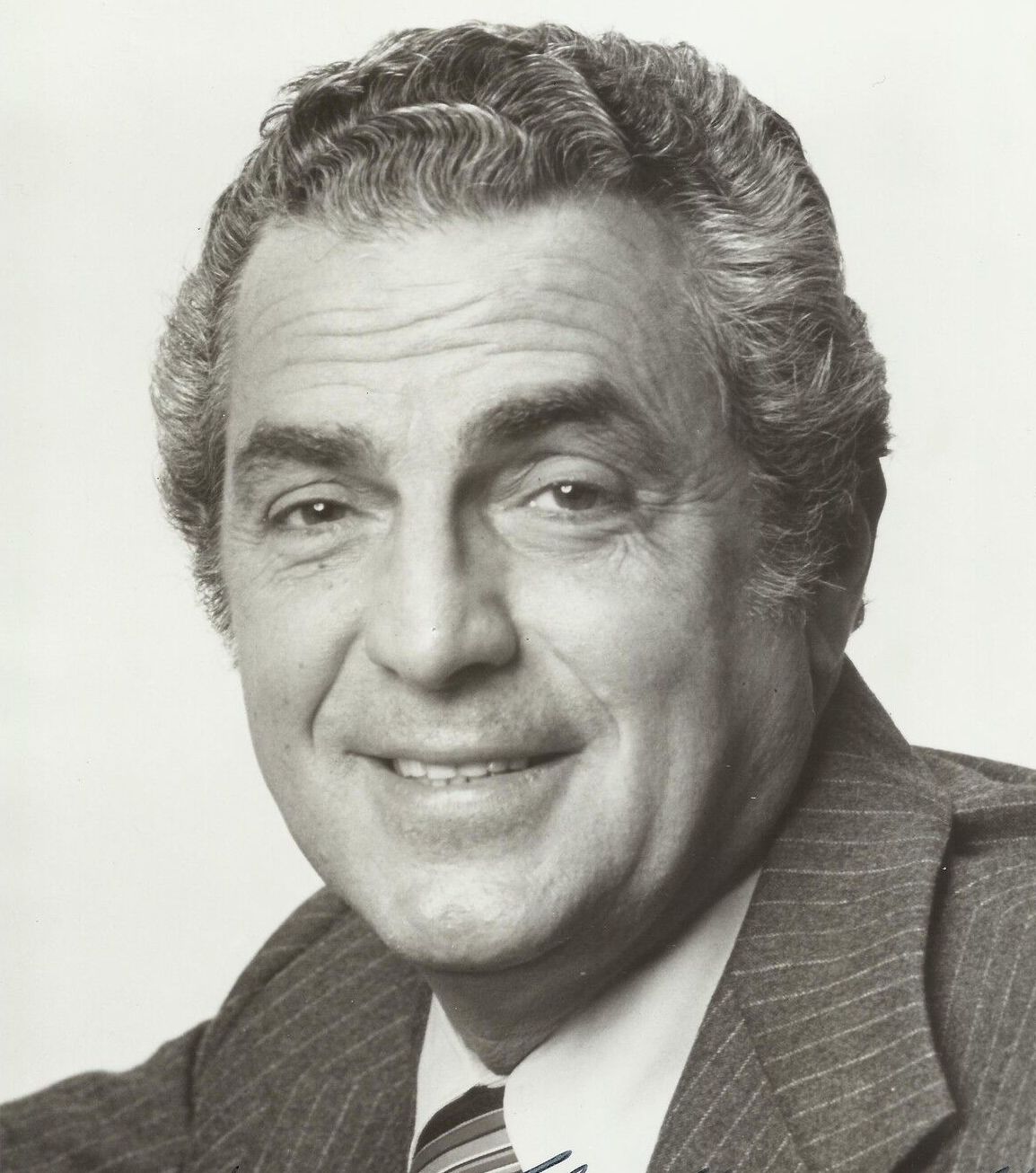
Mario Biaggi

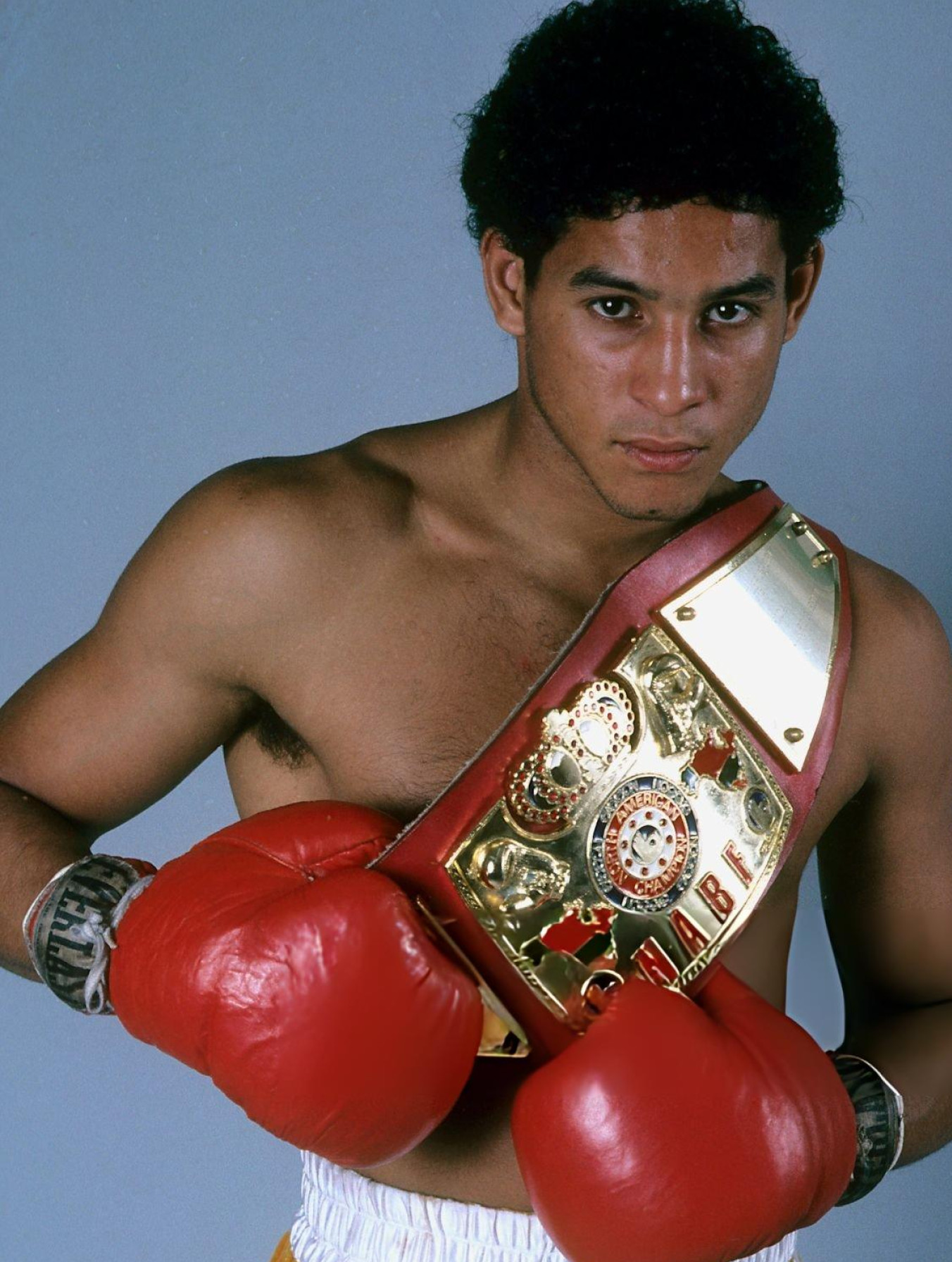
Héctor Camacho

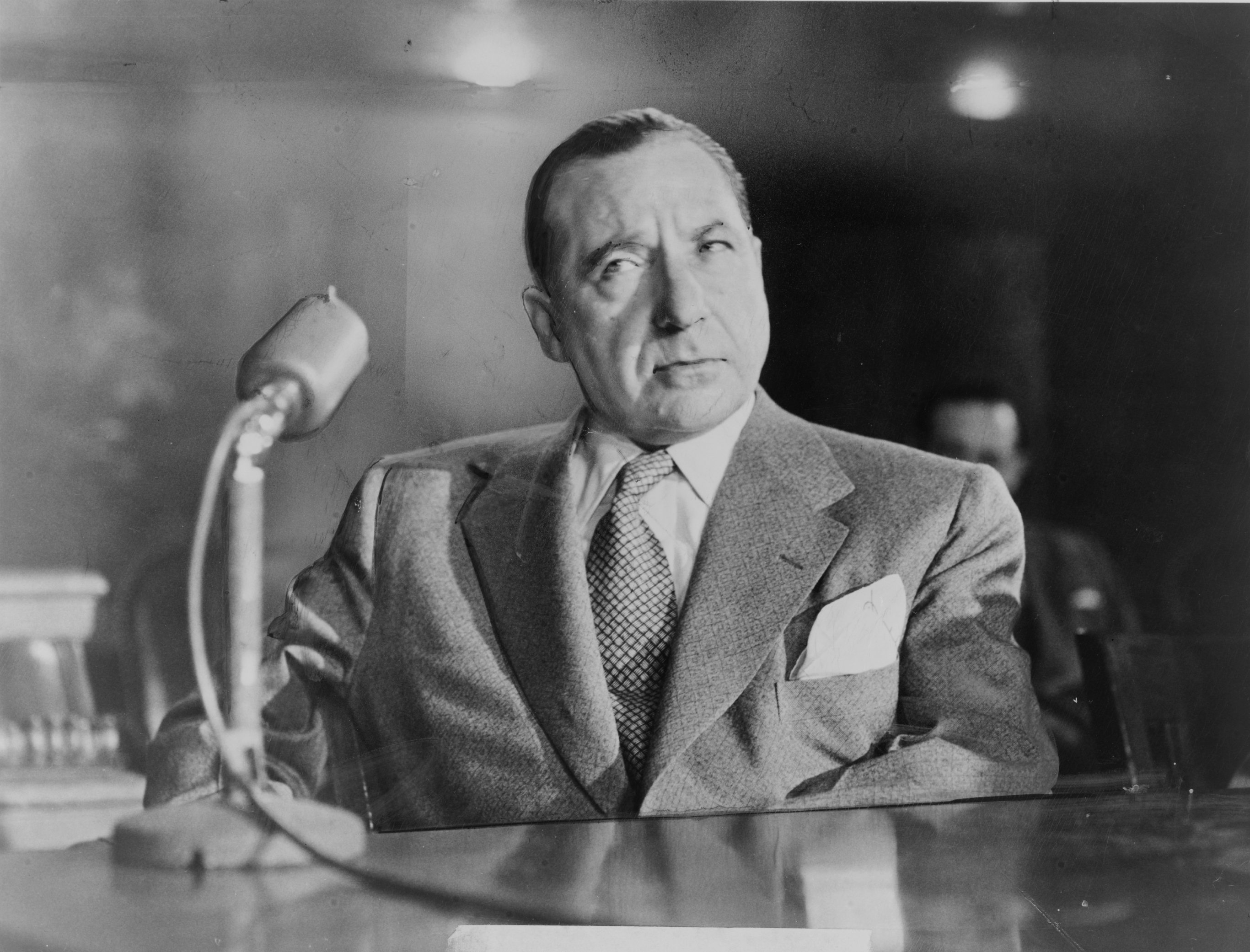
Frank Costello

Frankie Cutlass

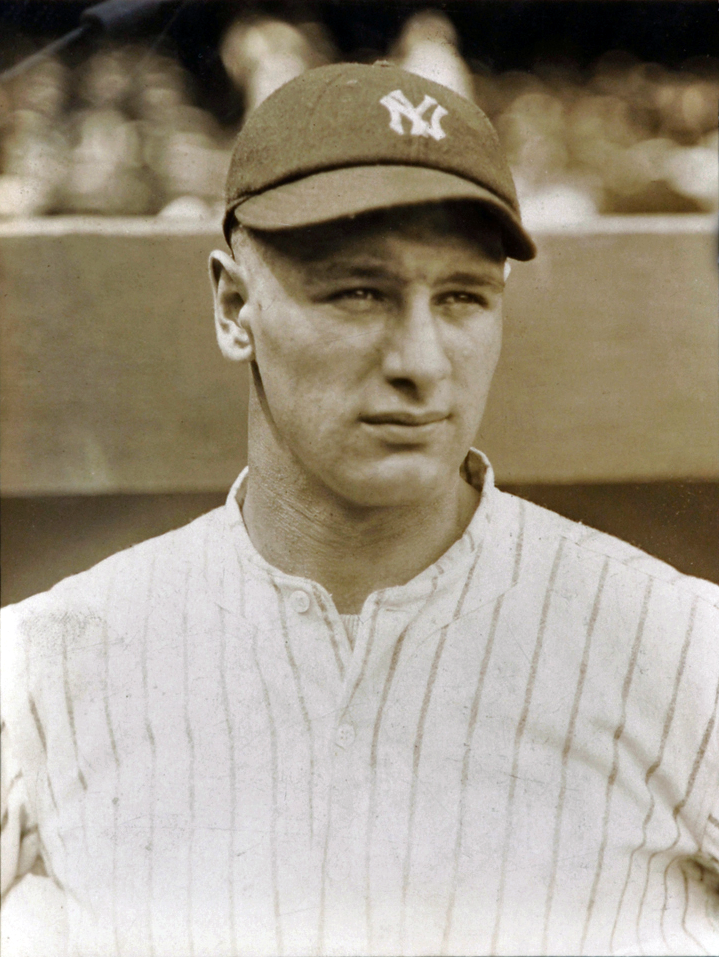
Lou Gehrig

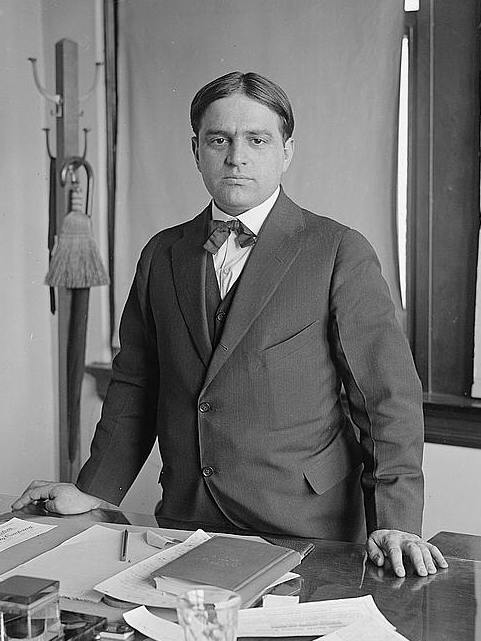
Fiorello H. La Guardia

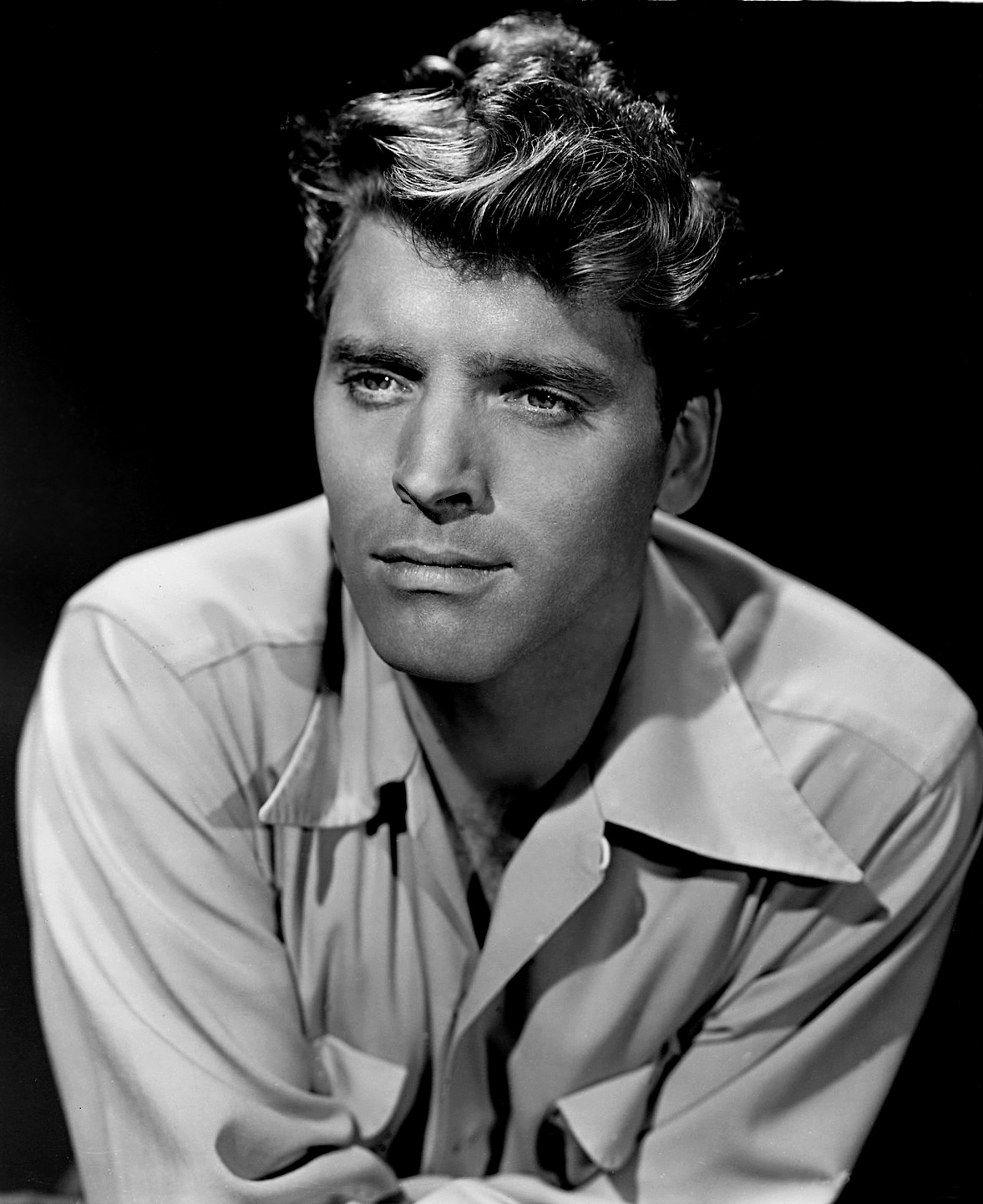
Burt Lancaster

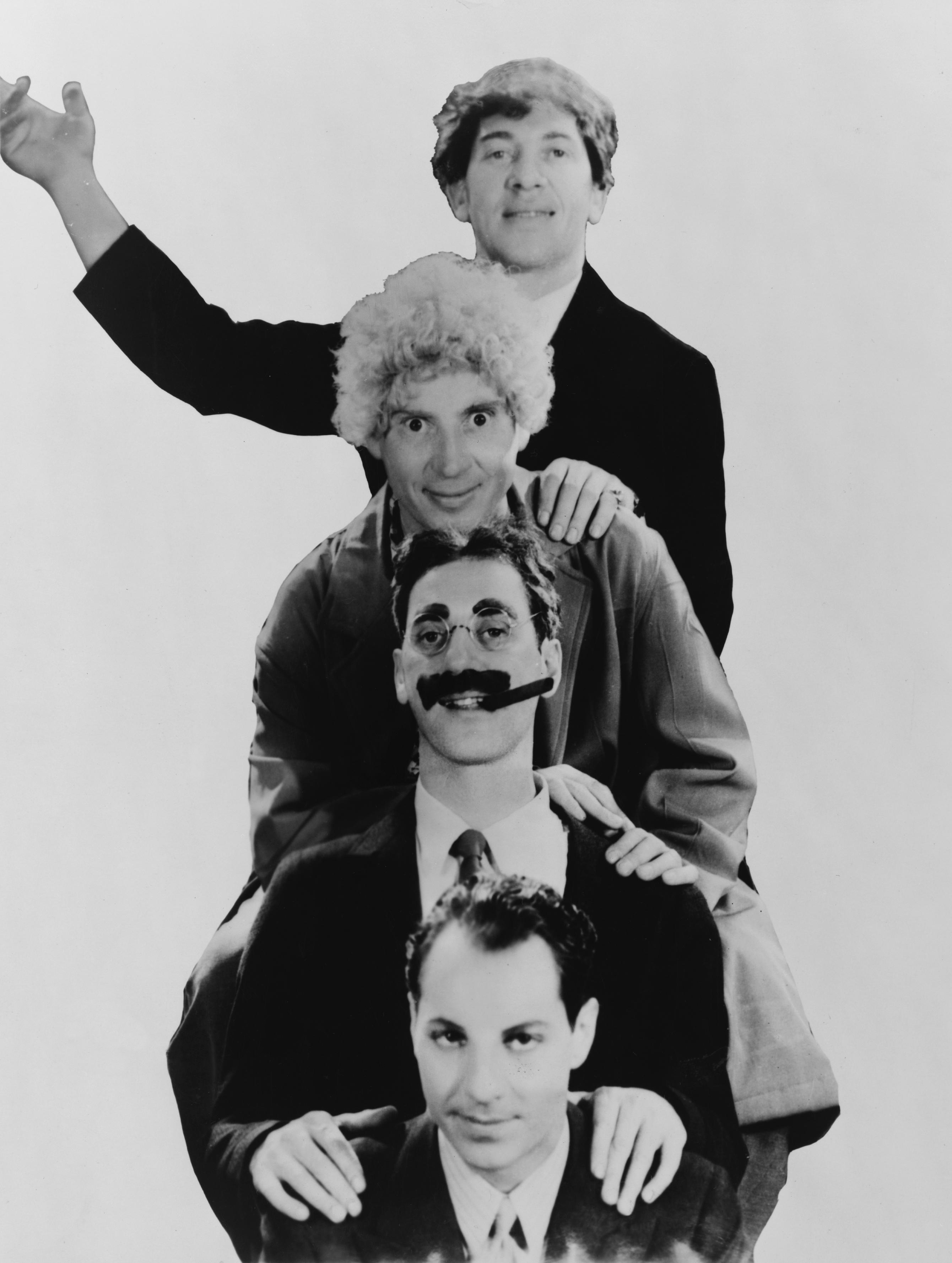
The Marx Brothers

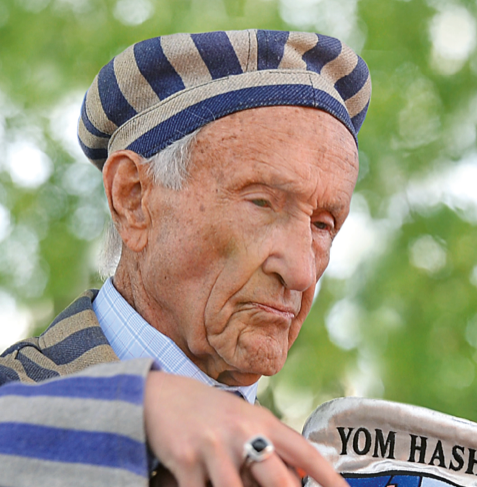
Edward Mosberg

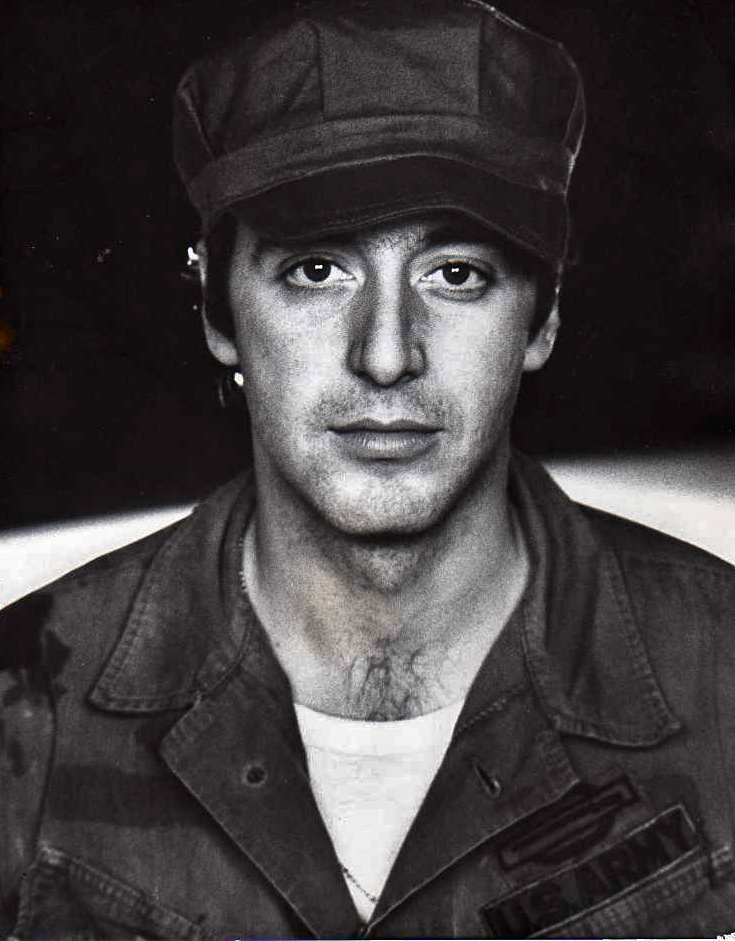
Al Pacino

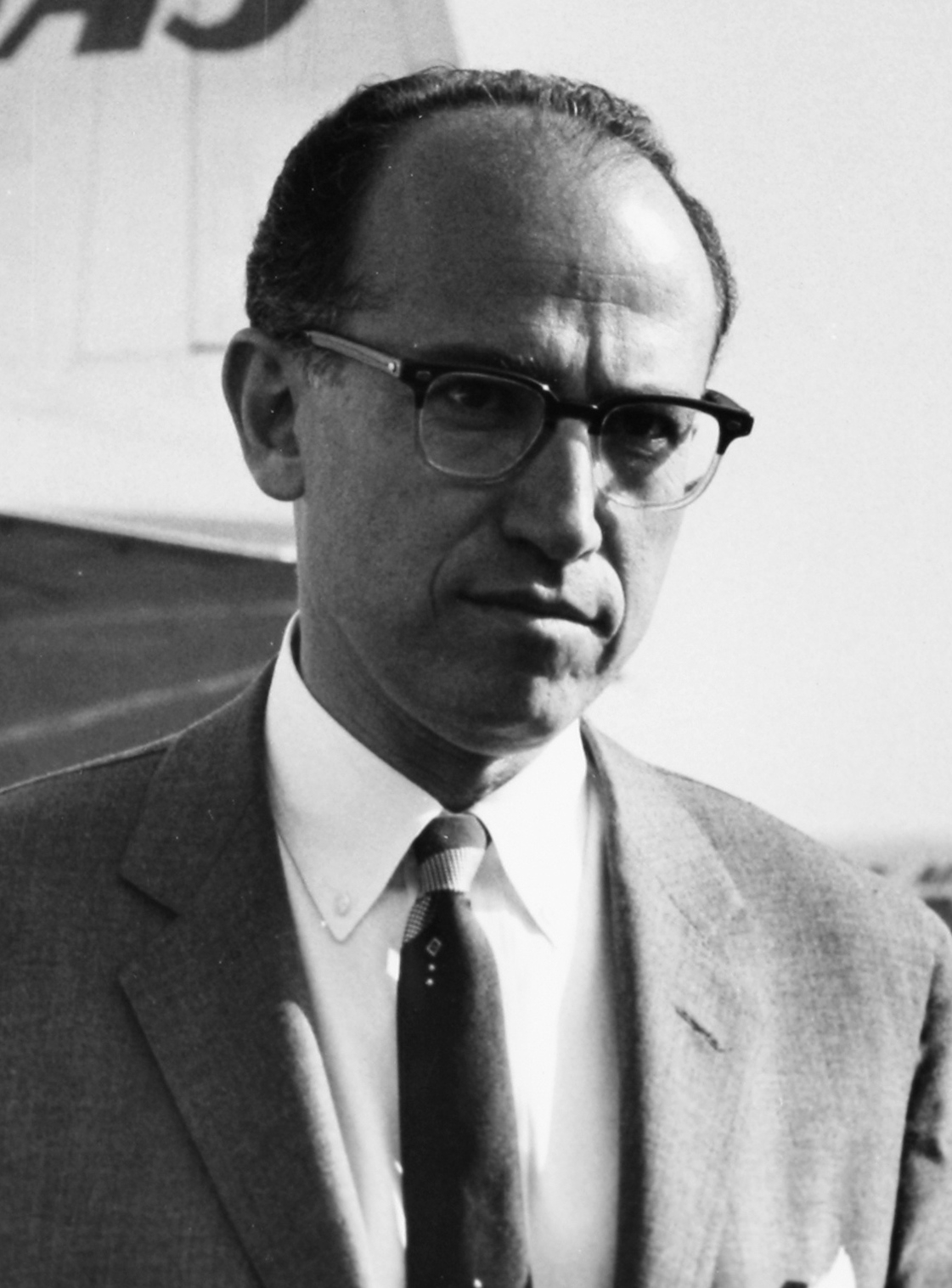
Jonas Salk

- Jack Agüeros (1934–2014), community activist, poet, writer, translator, and the former director of El Museo del Barrio.
- Petra Allende (1920–2002), community activist
- Marc Anthony (born 1968), singer and actor; a four-time Grammy Award and eight-time Latin Grammy Award winner.
- Arcángel (born 1985), reggaeton singer
- ASAP Rocky (born 1988), rapper
- Ray Barretto (1929–2006), musician
- Joe Bataan (born 1942), singer
- Gertrude Berg (born Tillie Edelstein, 1899–1966), actress, screenwriter, and producer.; a Tony Award and an Emmy Award, both for Best Lead Actress.
- Walter Berry (born 1964), former professional NBA basketball player.
- Mario Biaggi (1917–2015), decorated policeman and US Congressman
- Frank Bonilla (1925–2010), academic of Puerto Rican descent; leading figure in Puerto Rican studies.
- Joe Budden (born 1980), rapper and member of hip hop group Slaughterhouse.
- Héctor Camacho (1962–2012), commonly known by his nickname "Macho Camacho", Puerto Rican boxer, world champion in three weight classes, held the WBC super featherweight title, the WBC lightweight title, and the WBO junior welterweight title.
- Cam'ron (born 1976), rapper
- Duke Carmel (1937–2021), former professional baseball player who played all or part of four seasons in Major League Baseball.
- Daniel Celentano (1902–1980), artist
- Frank Costello (1891–1973), mobster
- Leonard Covello (1887–1982), educator, founder and first principal of Benjamin Franklin High School
- Frankie Cutlass (born 1971), DJ and record producer.
- Bobby Darin (1936–1973), singer, songwriter, and actor
- Julia de Burgos (1914–1953), Puerto Rican poet
- James De La Vega (c. 1974), visual artist best known for his street aphorisms and muralist art.
- Angelo Del Toro (1947–1994), politician
- Nelson Antonio Denis, New York State Assemblyman
- Dave East (born 1988), rapper
- Erik Estrada (born 1949), actor.
- Barbie Ferreira (born 1996), actress and model.
- Destiny Frasqueri (born 1992), rapper who performs under the stage name "Princess Nokia"
- Giosue Gallucci (1865–1915), gangster
- Lou Gehrig (born Heinrich Ludwig Gehrig; 1903–1941), nicknamed "the Iron Horse," Major League baseball player for the New York Yankees and member of the National Baseball Hall of Fame; 7× All-Star , 2× AL MVP, 5× AL RBI leader, 3× AL home run leader, AL batting champion, and Triple Crown.
- Ron Gilbert (born 1939/1940), actor who is best known for playing Daniel Metzheiser in the 1995 film The Usual Suspects
- Joan Hackett (1934–1983), actress who appeared on television, film and stage.
- Langston Hughes (1901–1967), writer and social activist
- Jose Cha Cha Jimenez (born 1948), founder of the Young Lords
- Evan Hunter (born Salvatore Albert Lombino; 1926– 2005), author of crime and mystery fiction.
- Jim Jones (born 1976), rapper
- Roger Katan, architect, planner, sculptor, and activist.
- DJ Kay Slay (1966–2022), hip hop disc jockey
- Fiorello H. La Guardia (1882–1947), Congressman and mayor of New York City
- Burt Lancaster (1913–1994), Oscar-winning actor and film producer
- Lillian López (1925–2005), activist and librarian
- Tommy Lucchese (1899–1967), mobster
- Lumidee (born 1984), rapper
- Machito (1908–1984), jazz musician
- Vito Marcantonio (1902–1954), lawyer and politician
- Alpo Martinez (1966–2021), former drug dealer who rose to prominence alongside Azie Faison and Rich Porter in the mid-1980s in Harlem during the war on drugs.
- Soraida Martinez (born 1956), artist and designer
- Marx Brothers – comedians
- Thomas Minter (1924–2009), education official who served in the United States government and the government of New York City.
- Monifah (born 1972), R&B singer-songwriter
- Edward Mosberg (1926–2022), Polish-American Holocaust survivor, educator, and philanthropist
- Alice Neel (1900–1984), painter
- Dael Orlandersmith (born 1960), actress, poet and playwright known for her Obie Award-winning Beauty's Daughter and the 2002 Pulitzer Prize Finalist in Drama, Yellowman.
- Al Pacino (born 1940), actor; received an Academy Award, two Tony Awards, and two Primetime Emmy Awards.
- Tito Puente (1923–2000), musician, songwriter, bandleader, timbalero, vibraphonist, and record producer.
- Ernesto Quiñonez (born 1969), writer
- Jim Rivera (1921–2017), Major League Baseball player.
- Anthony Salerno (1911–1992), mobster
- Jonas Salk (1914–1995), virologist who developed polio vaccine; received the Lasker Award, the Jawaharlal Nehru Award, the Congressional Gold Medal, and the Presidential Medal of Freedom.
- Ray Santos (1928–2019), Grammy Award-winning Latin musician.
- Tupac Shakur (1971–1996), rapper and actor
- Gregory Sierra (1937–2021), actor known for his roles as Detective Sergeant Chano Amengual on Barney Miller and as Julio Fuentes, the Puerto Rican neighbor of Fred G. Sanford on Sanford and Son.
- Ronnie Spector (1943–2022) and the Ronettes, singers
- Piri Thomas (1928–2011), writer
- Cicely Tyson (1924–2021), actress, received three Emmy Awards, a Peabody Award, and a Tony Award.
- Joseph Valachi (1904–1971), gangster, notable as the first member of the Italian-American Mafia to publicly acknowledge its existence, and credited with popularization of the term Cosa Nostra.
- Guy Velella (1944–2011) , New York State Senator and felon
- Marilyn Zayas (born 1965), judge who became the first Latina on the Ohio District Courts of Appeals when she was elected in 2016.

== In popular culture ==
Music

- Ben E. King's song "Spanish Harlem" (1961) and the 1966 cover of it by The Mamas & the Papas
- Bob Dylan's song "Spanish Harlem Incident" from his album Another Side of Bob Dylan (1964)
- Phil Ochs' song "Lou Marsh" from his album All the News That's Fit to Sing (1964)
- Louie Ramirez's song "Lucy's Spanish Harlem" from his album In the Heart of Spanish Harlem (1967)
- The Velvet Underground's song "I'm Waiting for the Man" (1967)
- Elton John's "Mona Lisas and Mad Hatters" from Honky Château (1972)
- Paul Simon's song "Adios Hermanos" from his album Songs from The Capeman (1997)
- Cocoa Brovaz, Tony Touch & Hurricane G's song "Spanish Harlem" (1997)
- Van Morrison's song "Contemplation Rose" from his anthology album "Philosopher's Stone" (1998)
- Carlos Santana's songs "Maria Maria" and "Smooth" from his album Supernatural (1999)
- Beirut's song "East Harlem" (2011)
- Edward W. Hardy's composition Flying (Dancing in Spanish Harlem) for Latin ensemble, alternative version for string quartet (2019)

Literature

- Piri Thomas's memoir Down These Mean Streets (1967)
- Ernesto Quiñonez's Spanish Harlem Trilogy, Bodega Dreams (2000), Chango's Fire (2005), Taina (2019)
- Nora Roberts's novel Salvation in Death (2008)

Film

- The film Popi (1969), written by Tina Pine and Lester Pine and directed by Arthur Hiller
- Nelson Denis's film Vote For Me! (2003)

Music videos

- Frankie Cutlass's "Puerto Rico" music video was shot in Spanish Harlem (1994)
- Jay-Z's "Death of Autotune" music video was shot inside Rao's Italian restaurant (2009)
- ASAP Rocky's "Peso" music video features footage of East Harlem (2011)

Video games

- In the upcoming video game Deadlock, the character Ivy is nicknamed "the savior of Spanish Harlem"

Art and culture

- 100 Gates Project, art initiative to transform metal security gates in New York's Lower east side to murals.

== Gallery ==
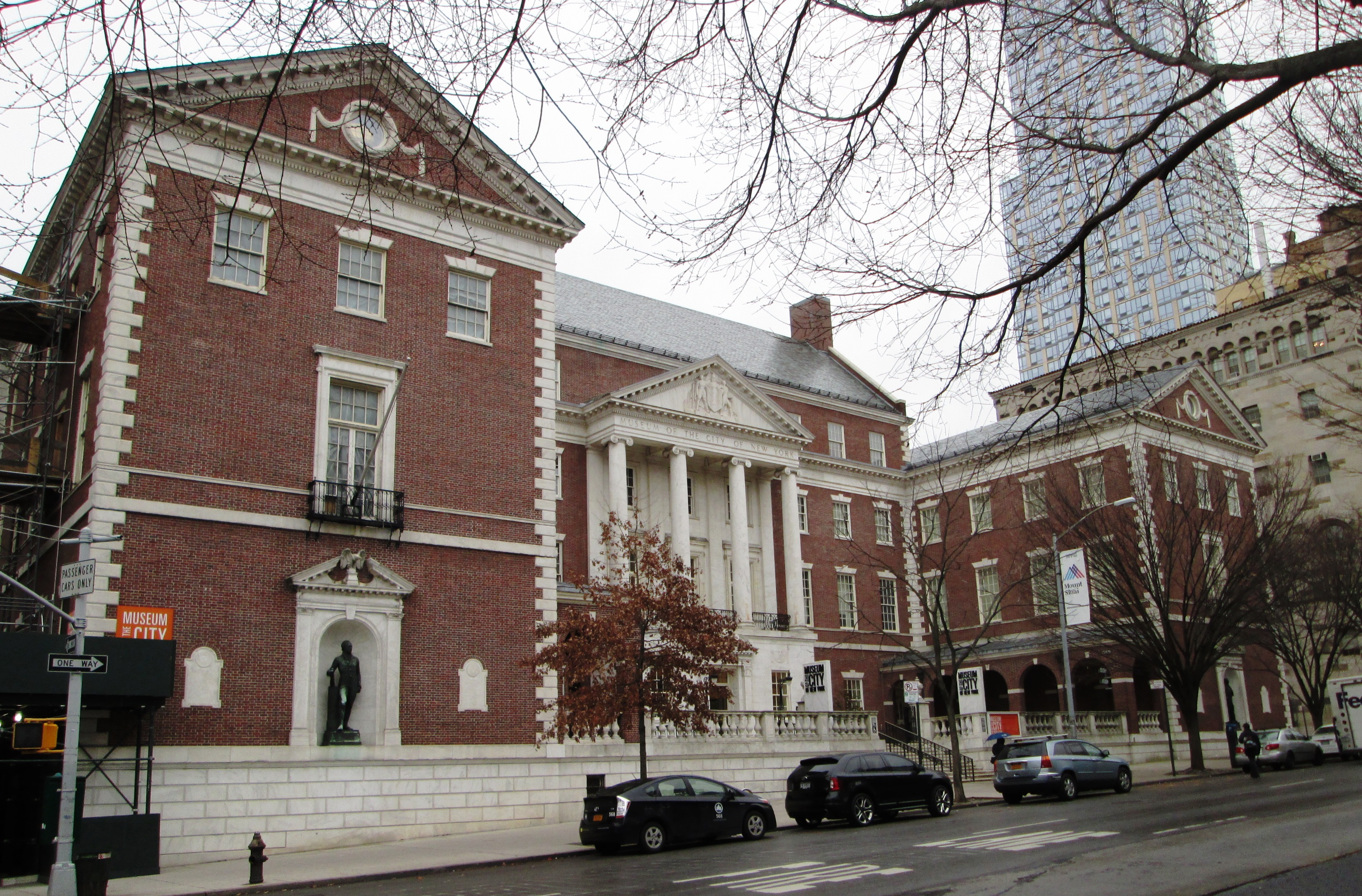
Museum of the City of New York
(1220 Fifth Ave.)

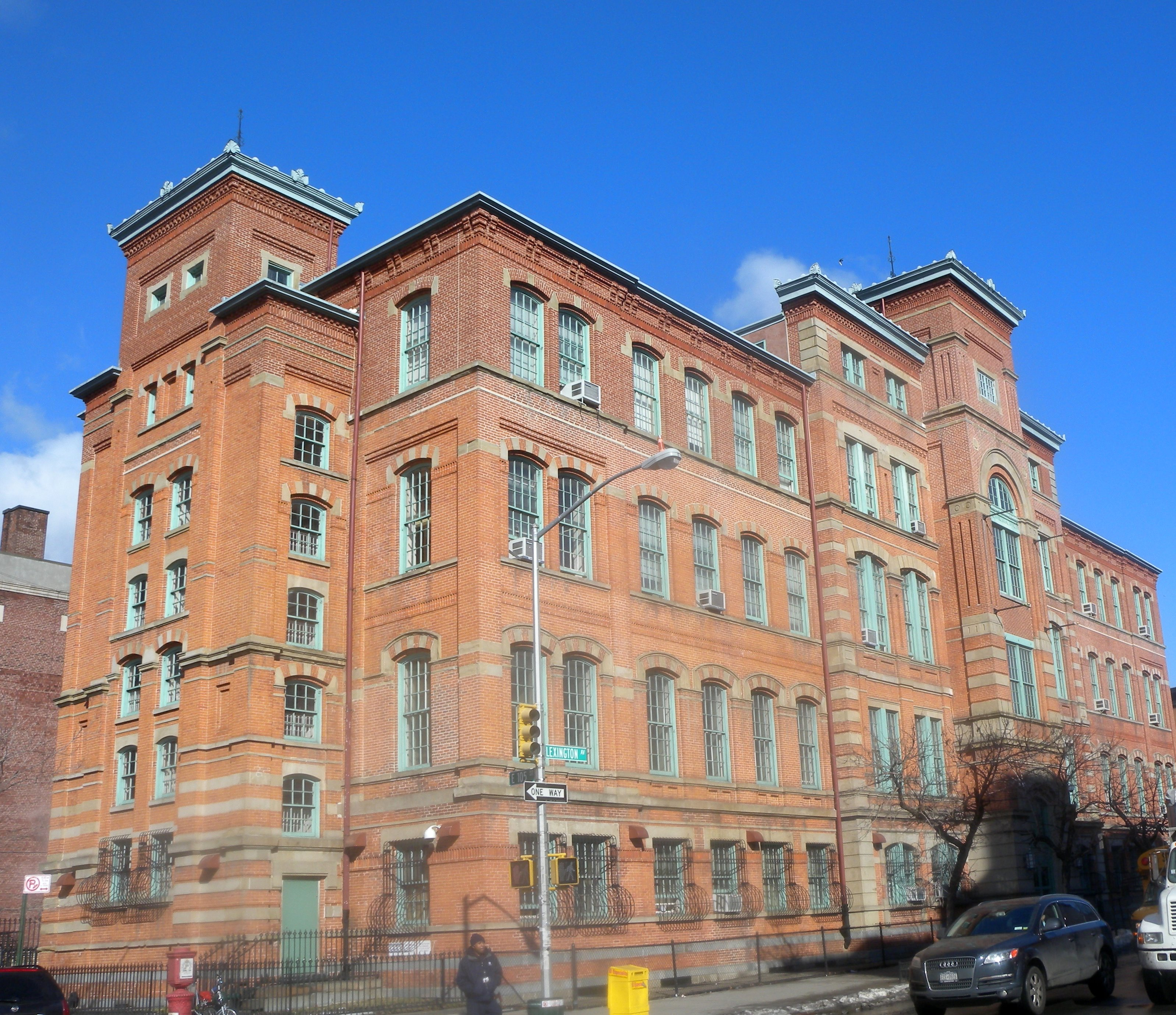
Julia de Burgos Latino Cultural Center, formerly P.S. 72
(1680 Lexington Ave.)

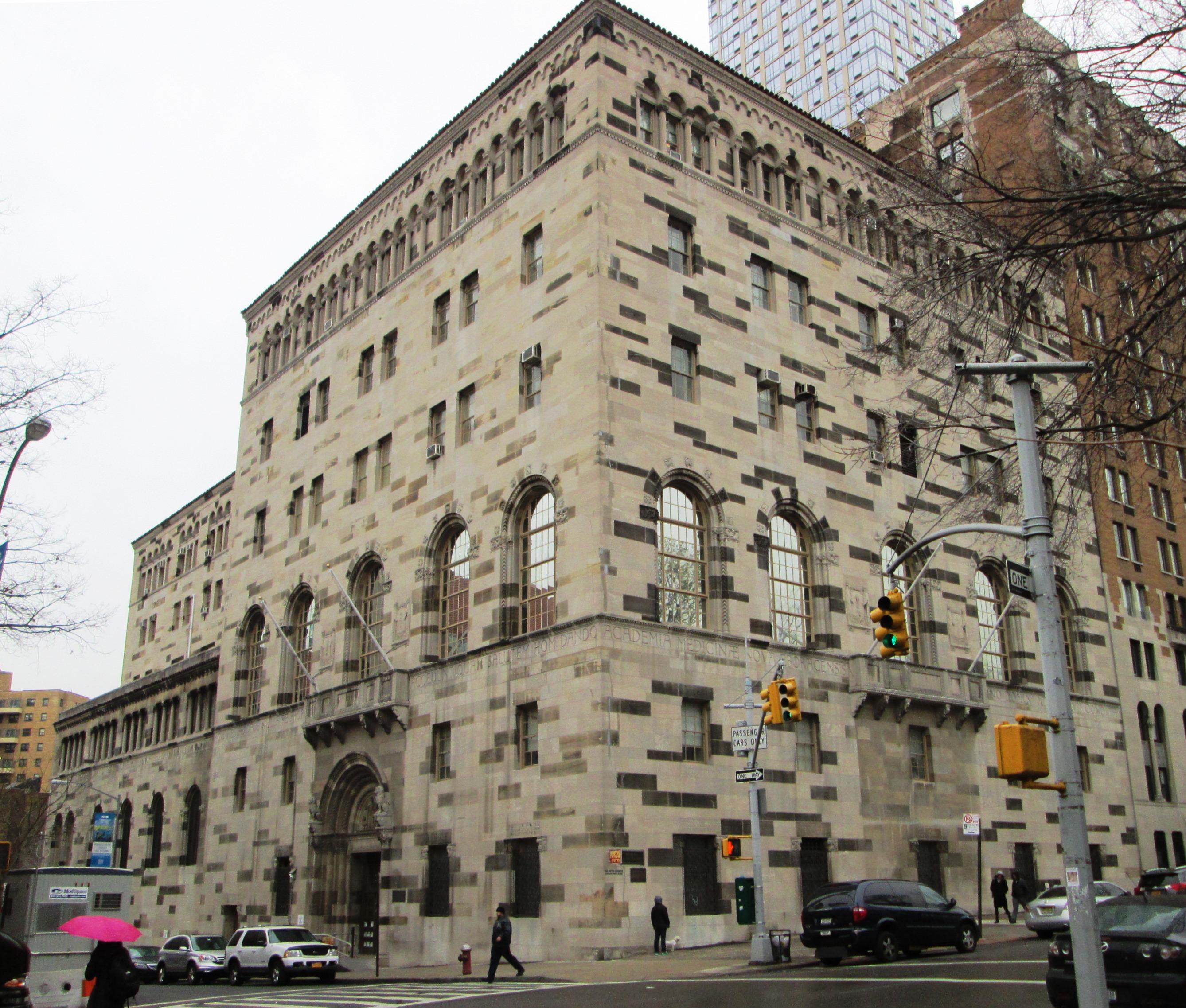
New York Academy of Medicine
(2 East 103rd St.)

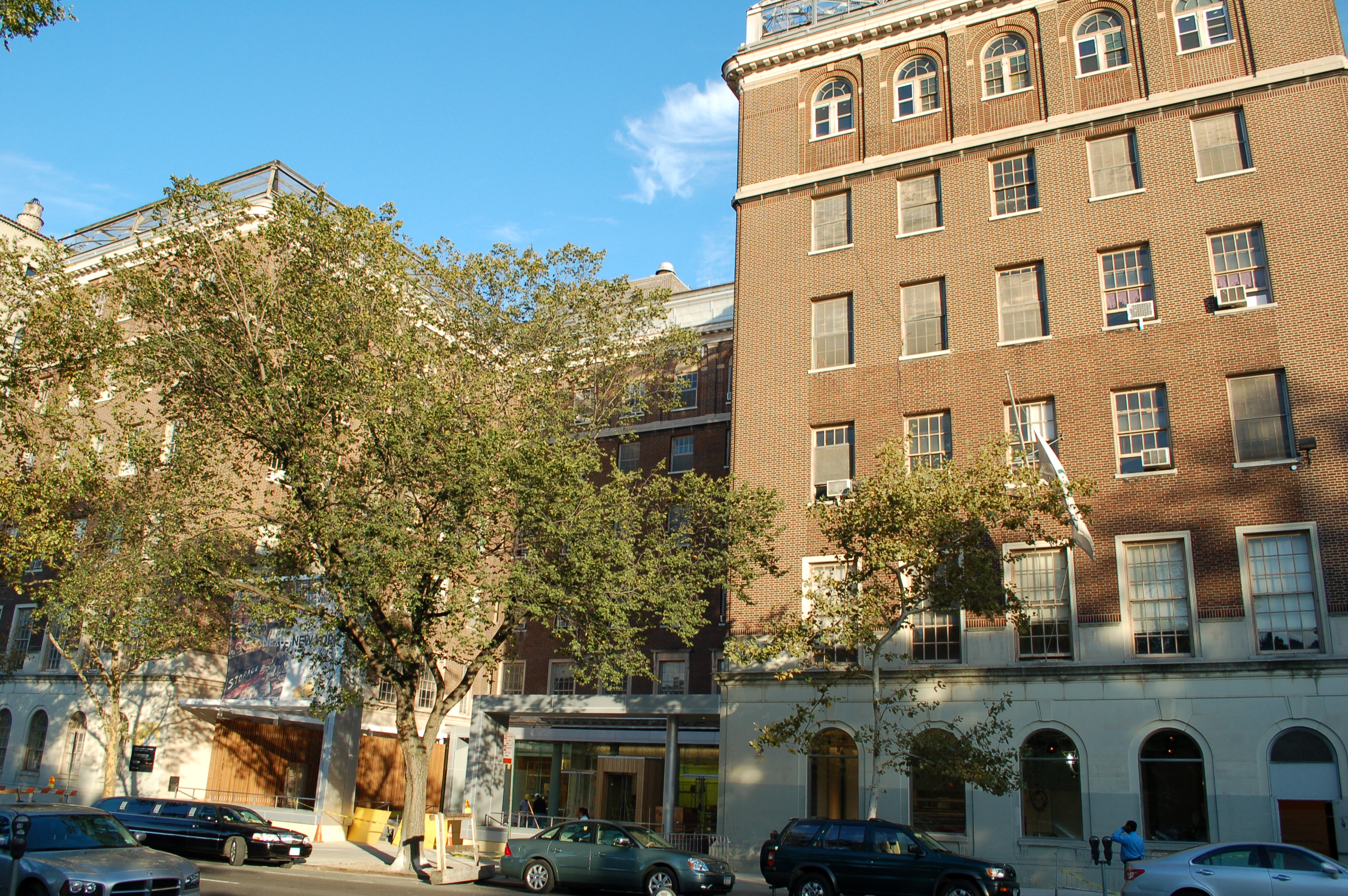
El Museo del Barrio
(1230 Fifth Ave.)

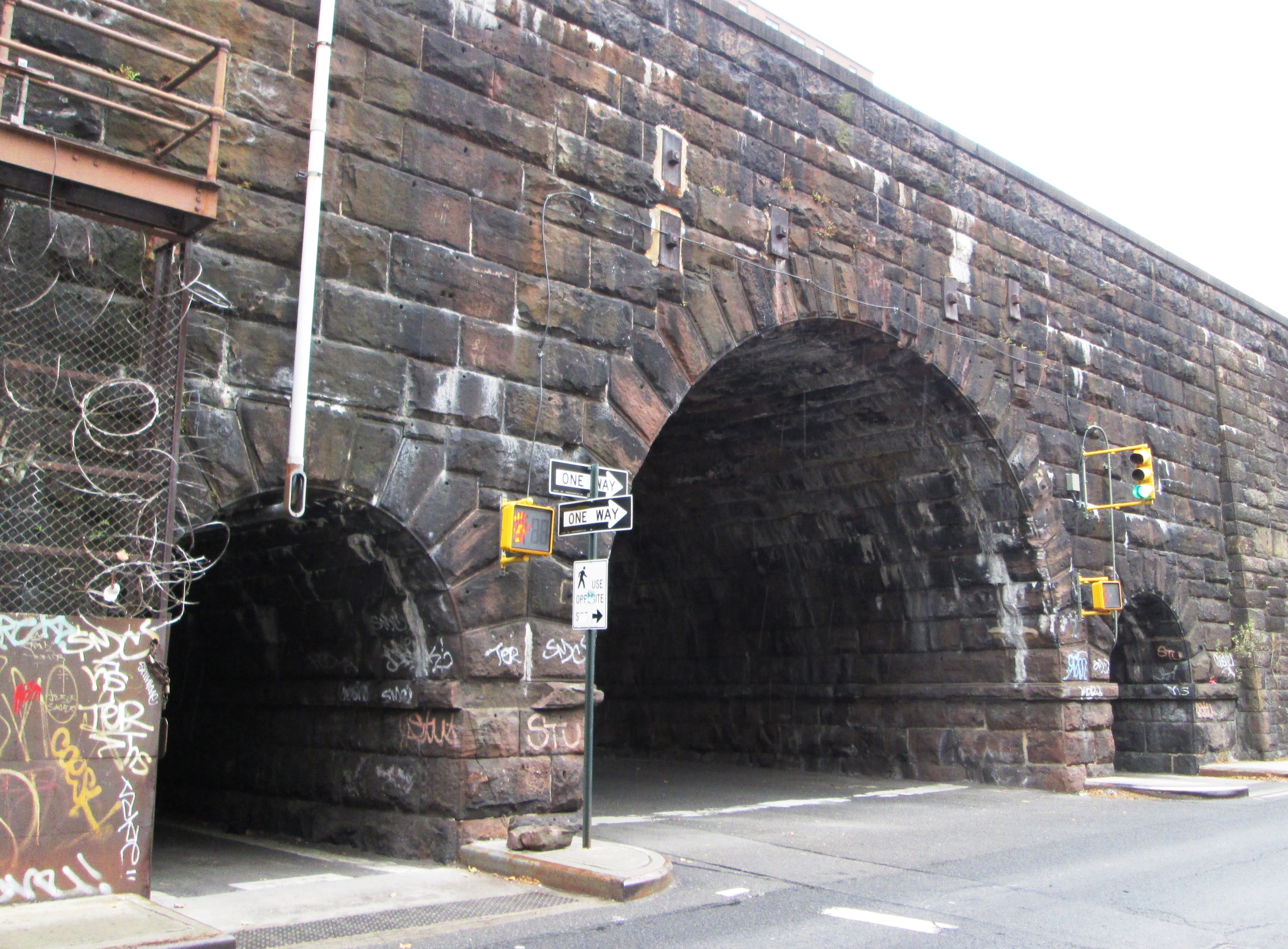
Tunnels through the Metro-North viaduct
(Park Avenue and 105th St.)

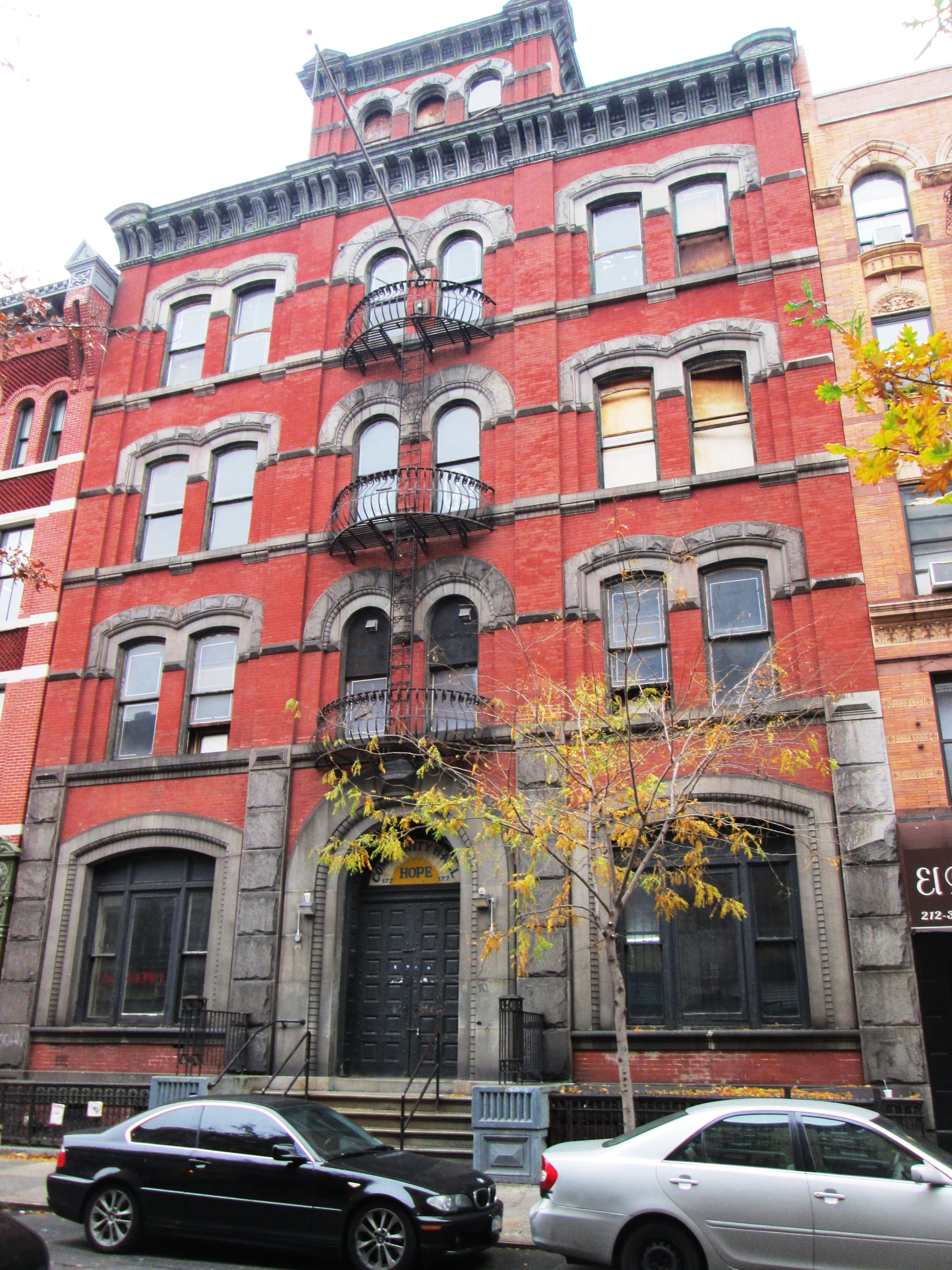
Hope Community Hall, formerly the 28th Police Precinct Station
(177 East 104th St.)

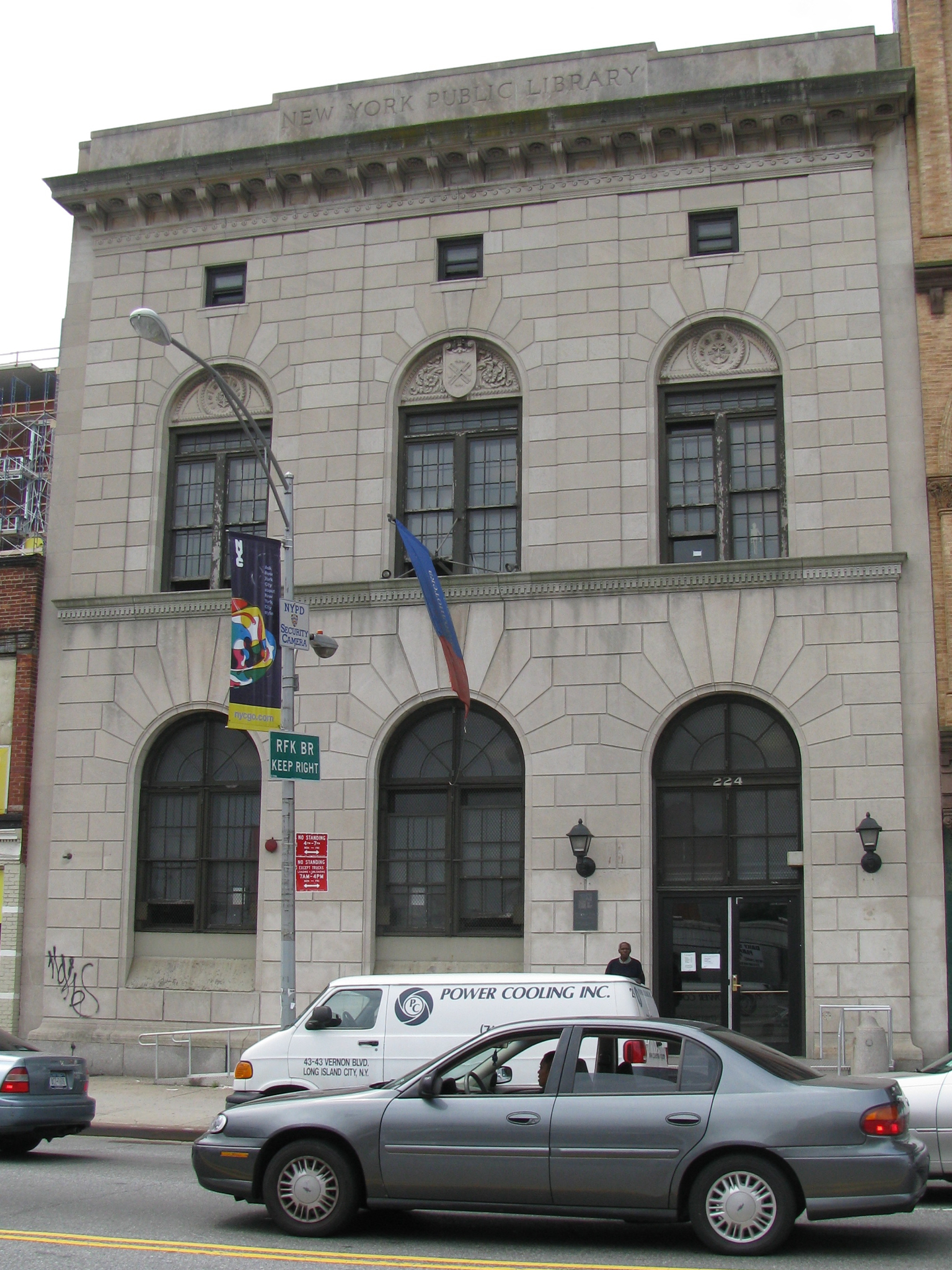
New York Public Library 125th St. Branch
(224 East 125th St.)

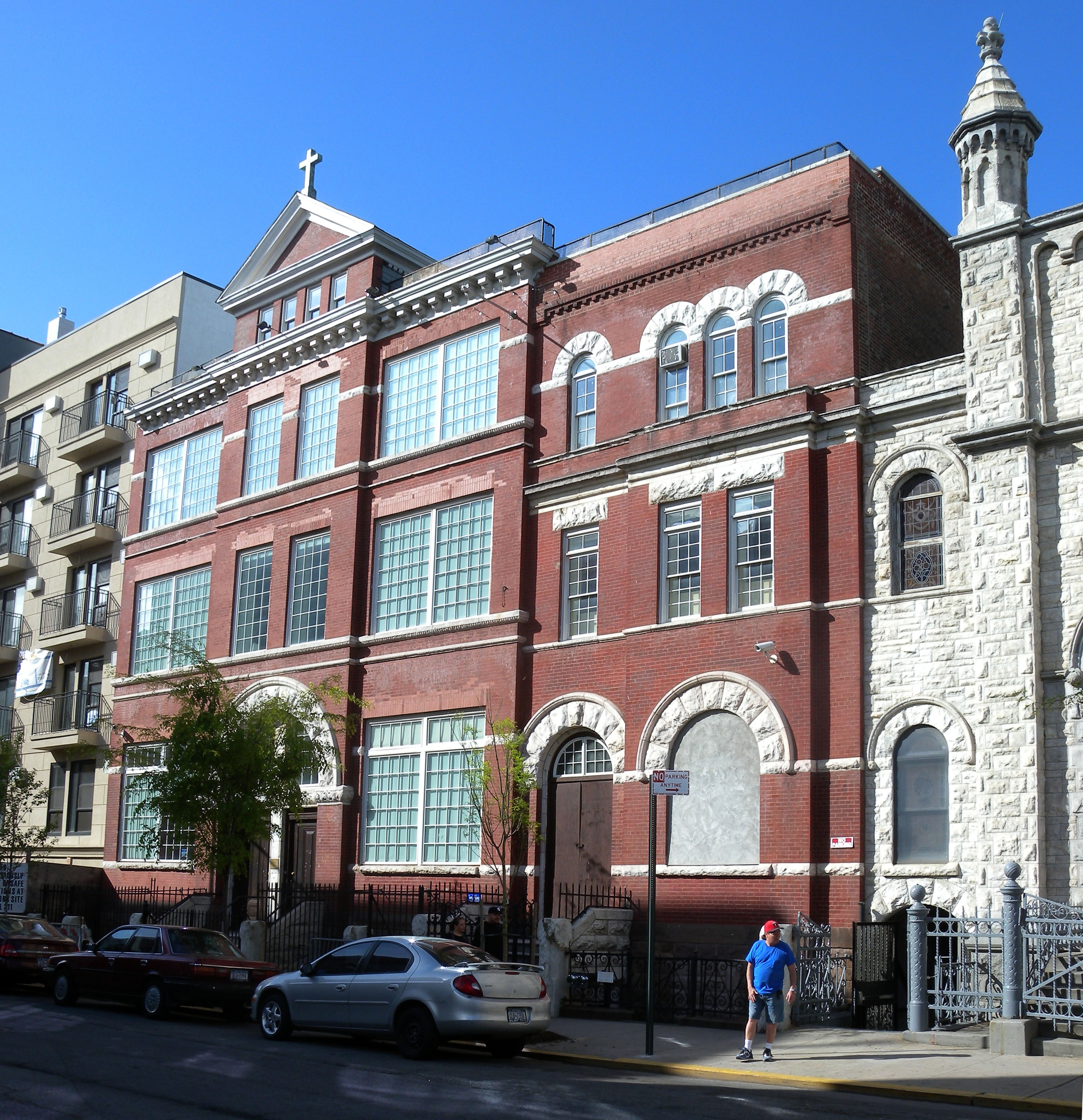
National Museum of Catholic Art and History
(443 East 115th St.)

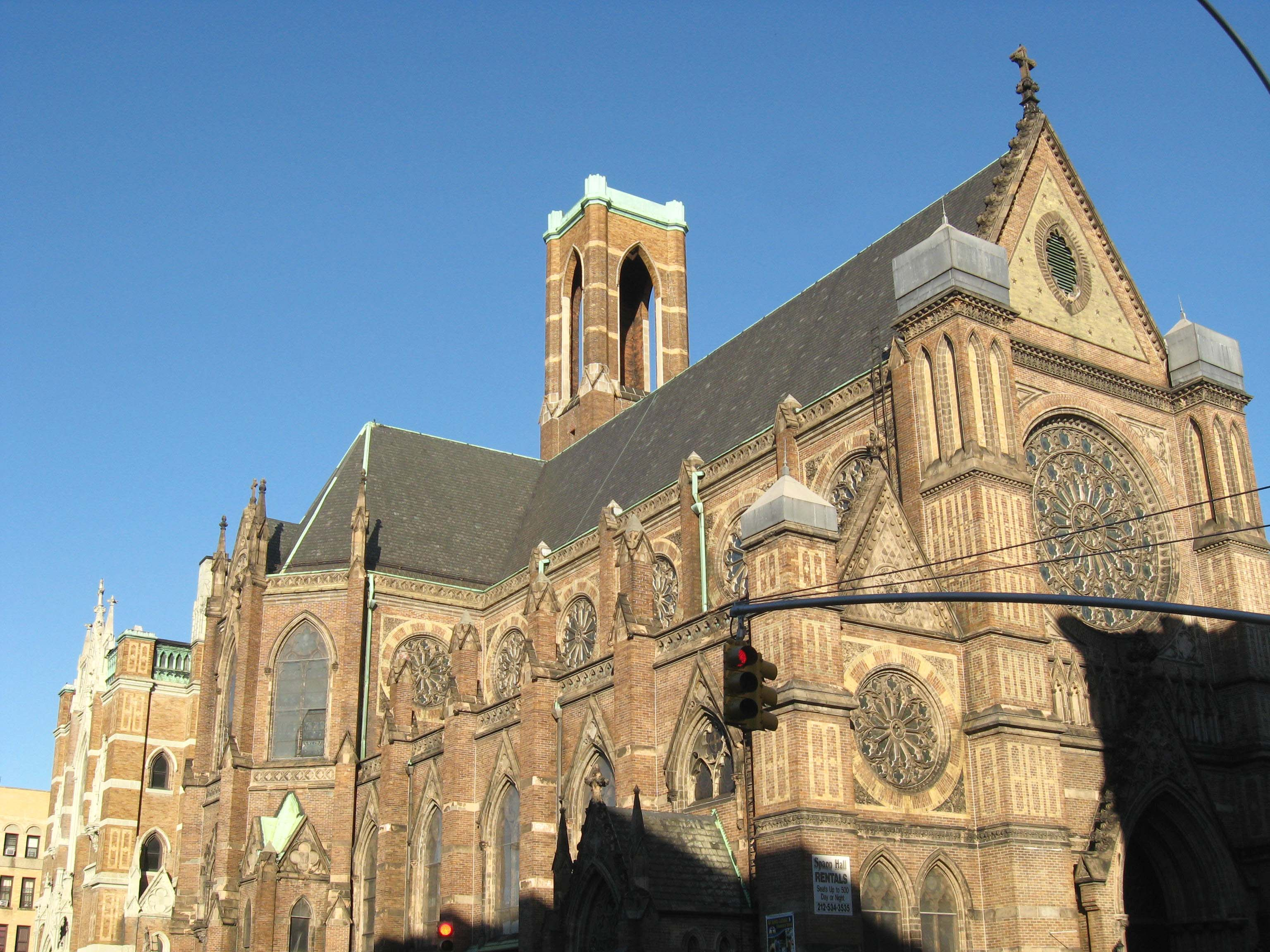
All Saints Roman Catholic Church
(47 East 129th St.)

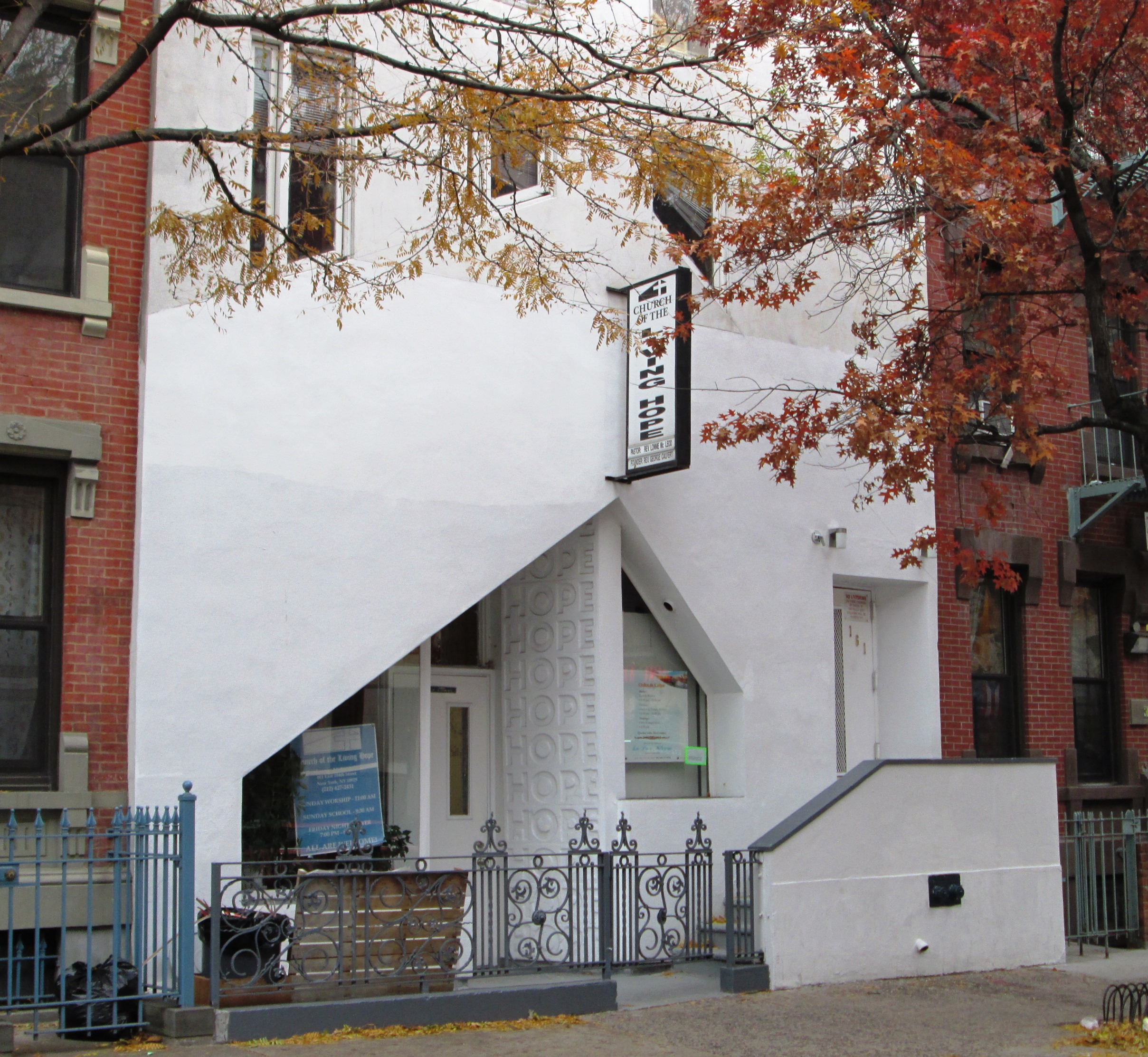
Church of the Living Hope
(161 East 104th St.)

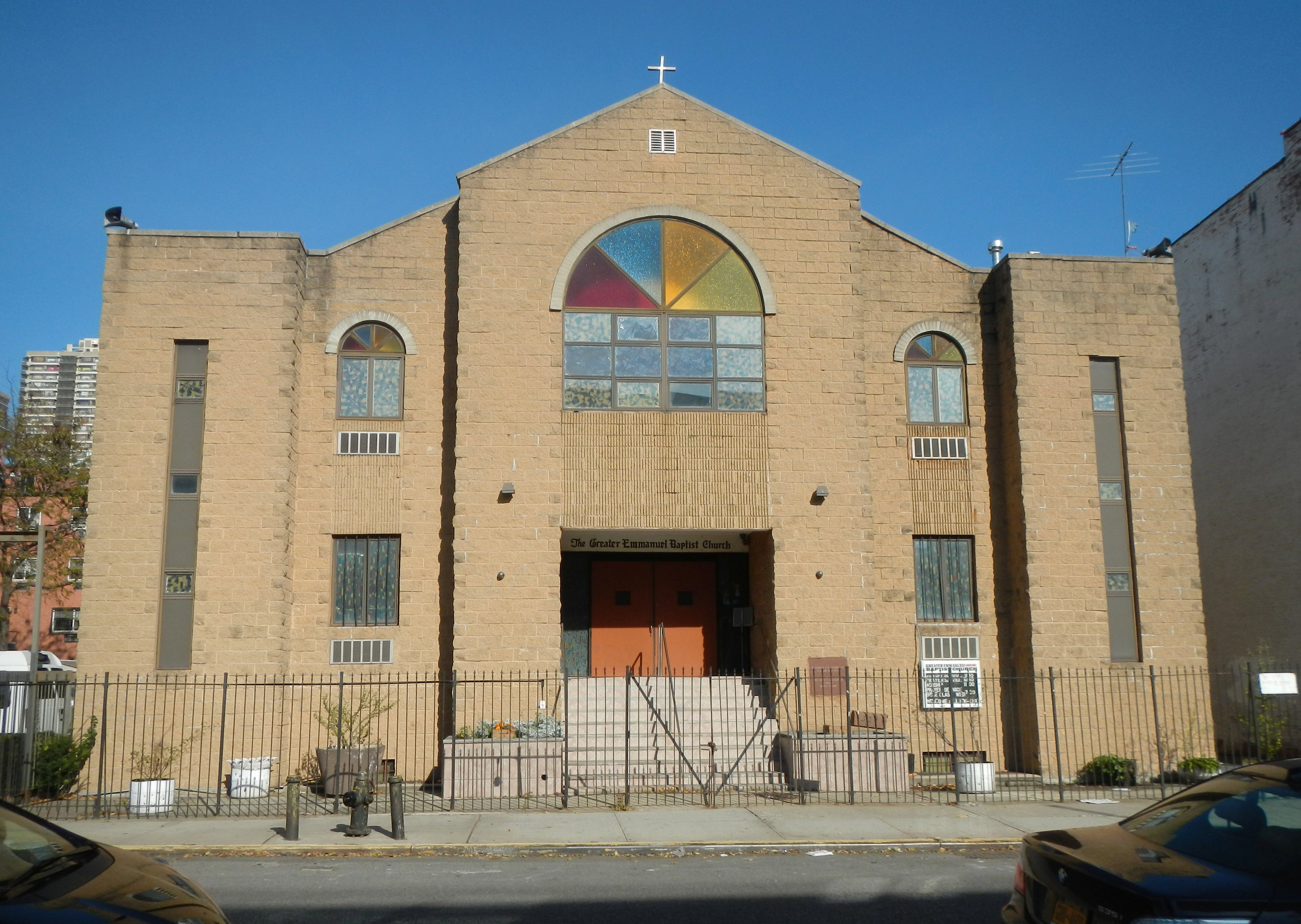
Greater Emmanuel Baptist Church
(325 East 118th St.)

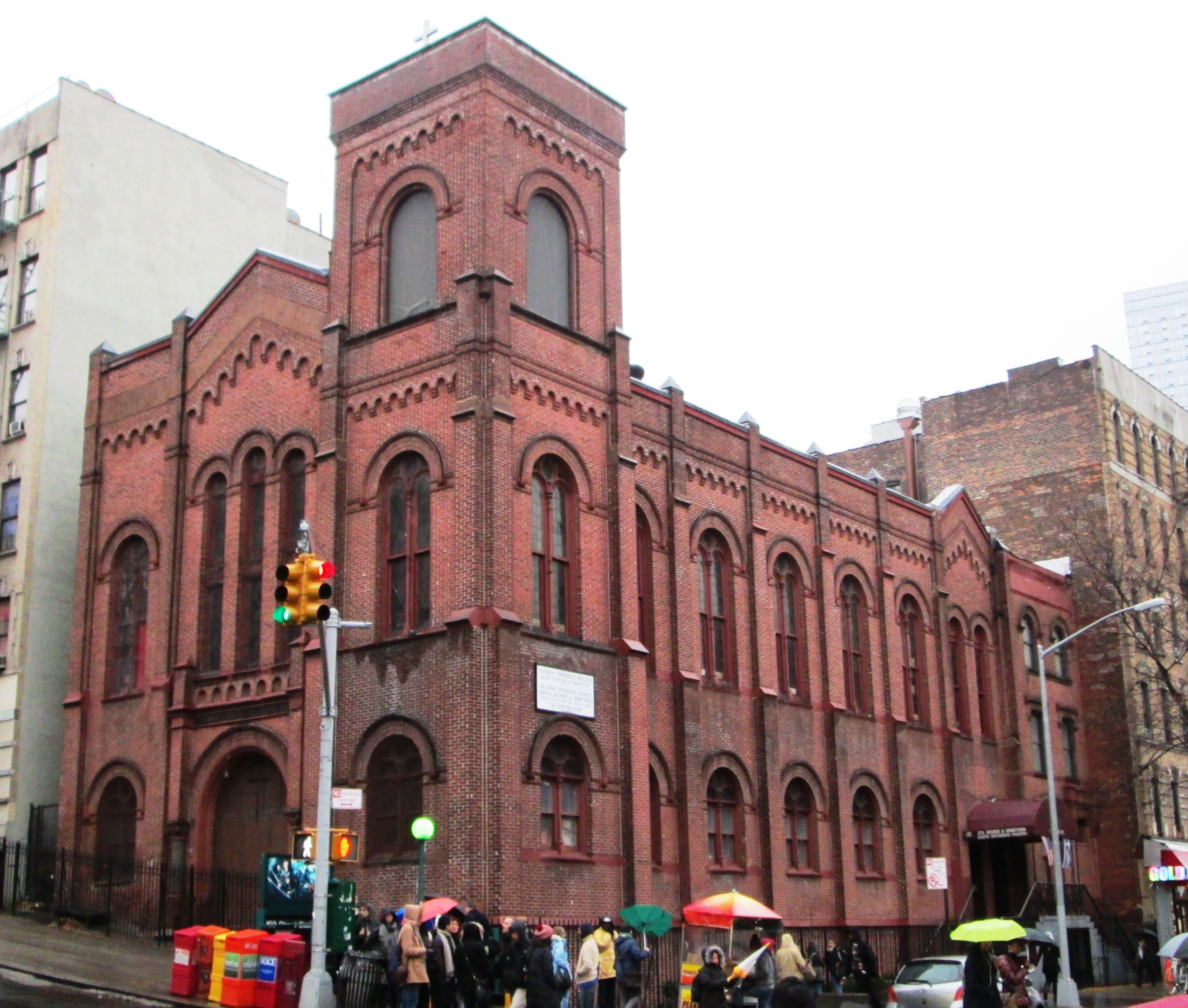
Hellenic Orthodox Church of Sts. George and Demetrios
(140 East 103rd St.)
