= Jackie Robinson Park =

Public park in Manhattan, New York

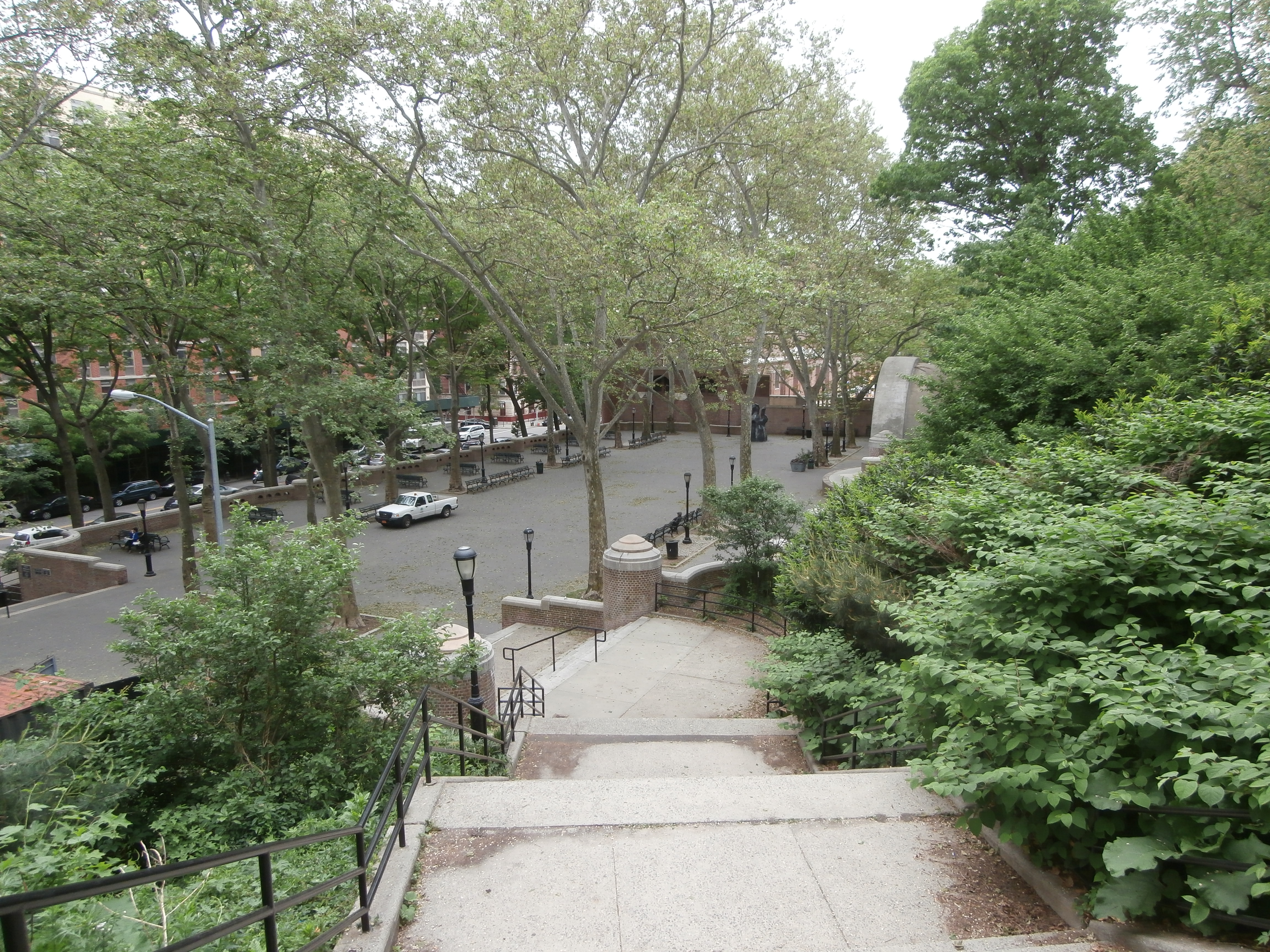
- The curved stairway from Edgecombe Avenue and 150th Street, looking down toward the dance terrace
- Interactive map of Jackie Robinson Park
- Type: Urban park
- Location: Hamilton Heights and Harlem, Manhattan, New York City
- Coordinates: 40°49′36″N 73°56′28″W
- Area: 12.77 acres (5.17 ha)
- Created: 1911
- Operator: NYC Parks
- Public transit: Subway: to 155th Street to 145th Street to 155th Street; Bus: M2, M3, M10, Bx6, Bx6 SBS, Bx19

New York City Landmark
- Designated: April 10, 2007
- Reference no.: 2238
- Designated entity: Bathhouse facade and pool

New York City Landmark
- Designated: April 10, 2007
- Reference no.: 2239
- Designated entity: Bathhouse interior

Jackie Robinson Park (formerly Colonial Park) is a public park in the Hamilton Heights and Harlem neighborhoods of Manhattan in New York City. The approximately 12.77-acre (5.17 ha) park is bounded by Bradhurst Avenue to the east, 155th Street to the north, Edgecombe Avenue to the west, and 145th Street to the south. The park has baseball fields, basketball courts, restrooms, and a bandshell, which are arranged around the park's steep terrain. It also includes the Jackie Robinson Play Center, which consists of a recreation center and a pool. Jackie Robinson Park is maintained by the New York City Department of Parks and Recreation (NYC Parks).

The land for the park was acquired from 1894 to 1899 and the first section opened in 1911 as Colonial Park. Aymar Embury II designed the pool, which was constructed from 1935 to 1936 as part of a Works Progress Administration project. During the mid-20th century, the park received most of its other recreational facilities. The park was renamed after baseball player Jackie Robinson in 1978. The pool was extensively refurbished from 1978 to 1980. The New York City Landmarks Preservation Commission designated the park, as well as the lobby of the Jackie Robinson Play Center, as city landmarks in 2007.

== Description ==
Jackie Robinson Park is bounded by 145th Street to the south, Edgecombe Avenue to the west, 155th Street and the 155th Street Viaduct to the north, (Note: At the northern end of Jackie Robinson Park, the 155th Street Viaduct carries traffic above an unconnected lower level of 155th Street.) and Bradhurst Avenue to the east. It covers 12.77 acres (5.17 ha), although the park is significantly narrower along its west–east axis relative to its width. Jackie Robinson Park's site encompasses steep terrain, with the Edgecombe Avenue portion being significantly higher than the Bradhurst Avenue portion. North of 155th Street, the cliff within Jackie Robinson Park becomes Coogan's Bluff, which is part of Highbridge Park; the Polo Grounds baseball stadium was formerly below the cliff. Most of the facilities and entrances are along Bradhurst Avenue, although there are also stairs leading from Edgecombe Avenue's intersections with 145th, 150th and 155th Streets. Consequently, Jackie Robinson Park is more popular among residents of Central Harlem to the east than among residents of Hamilton Heights to the west.

Jackie Robinson Park is one of four "Historic Harlem Parks", a group of parks by the New York City Department of Parks and Recreation (NYC Parks) that are characterized by their steep terrain. The other parks in the grouping are St. Nicholas Park and Morningside Park to the south, and Marcus Garvey Park to the southeast.

=== Recreational facilities ===
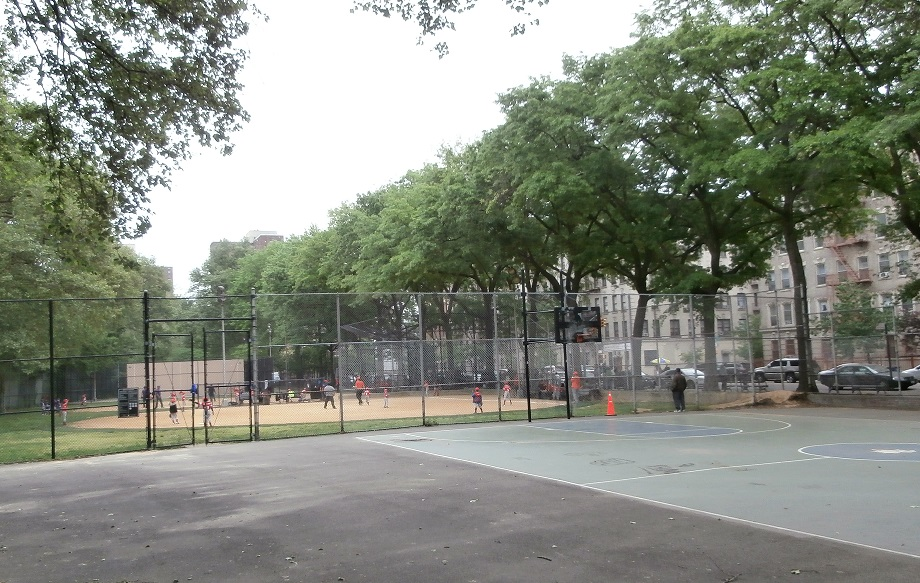
Basketball courts

Jackie Robinson Park contains two playgrounds along the Bradhurst Avenue end, both with restrooms. The playgrounds are named after their respective cross streets, spelled out and in Roman numerals. Playground One Forty Nine CIL is at 149th Street, while Playground One Fifty Two CLII is between 152nd and 153rd Streets. The playground at 152nd Street was previously the park's wading pool. (Note: It is not known when the wading pool area was infilled. Landmarks Preservation Commission 2007, p. 18, cites a drawing from 1946 that marks the area as a playground.) There is also a recreational area along Bradhurst Avenue between the two playgrounds. This consists of two baseball fields at 150th Street, one basketball court south of 150th Street, and four handball courts at 151st Street. The sporting fields and playgrounds were built in 1936, as part of the Works Progress Administration (WPA) program, and have been modified since then.

The Jackie Robinson Pool is in the southernmost section of the park, just north of 146th Street. It consists of the main pool as well as a smaller water play area to the north. The deck surrounding the pool area is narrow because of the topography and width of the park. The topography constraints also resulted in an irregular shape for the pool area. The main pool measures 82 by 236 feet (25 by 72 m), with a depth of 3.5 feet (1.1 m). The pool could fit 4,090 bathers simultaneously and has a non-standard dimension compared to other WPA pools in the city. It is mostly rectangular, but its southern end is rounded as in a semicircle. The former diving pool to the north was pentagonal in layout, resembling a rectangle with the northwestern corner being truncated. It was converted into a children's play area with sprinklers and other water features. A set of bleachers runs along the western retaining wall of the main pool and the northern retaining wall of the original diving pool. South of the pool area is a service entrance with a circular plaza paved in hexagonal tiles.

=== Recreation center ===
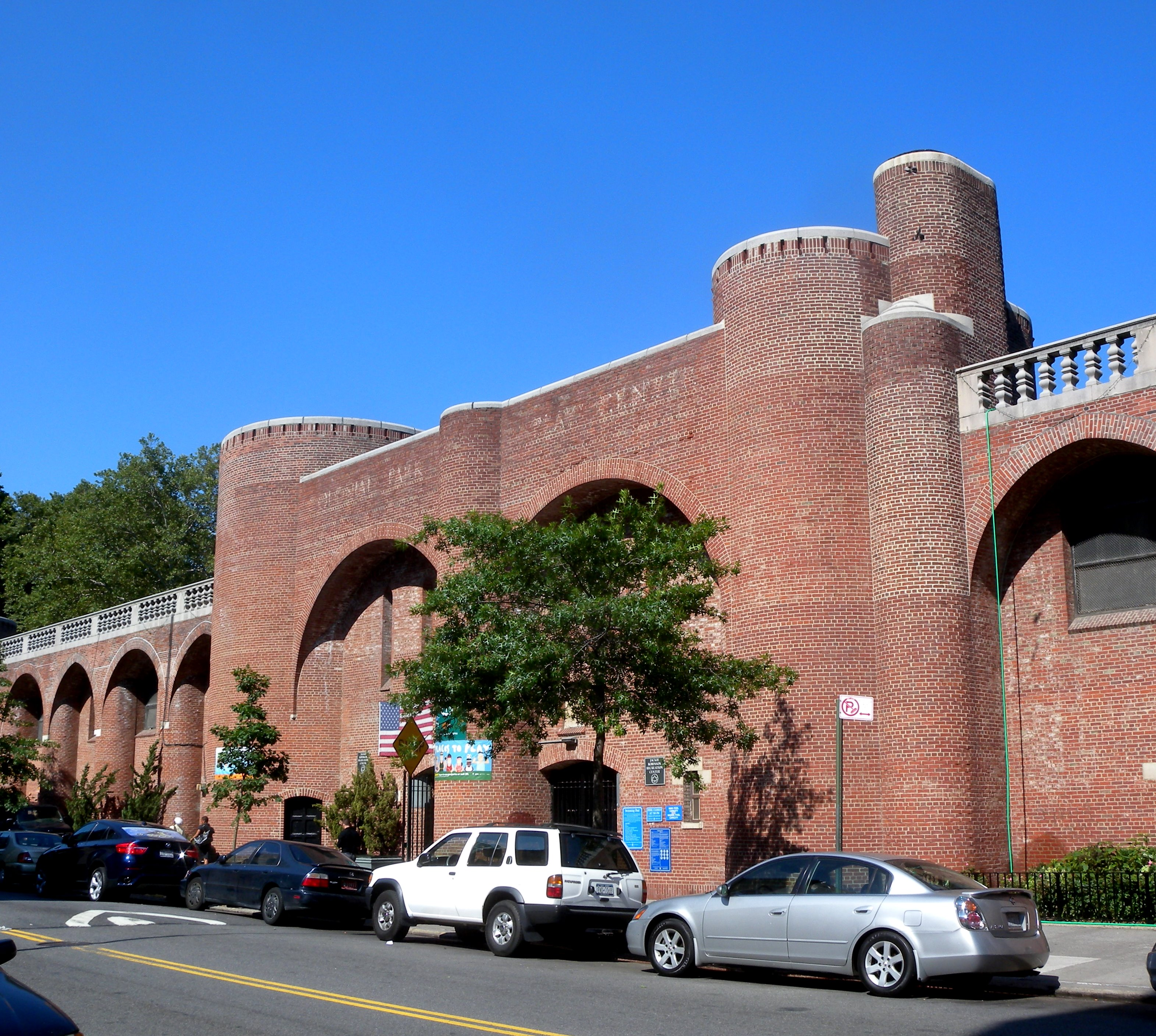
Exterior of the recreation center, seen from Bradhurst Avenue

The recreation center is built on a slope east of the pool between 146th and 147th Streets. The building contains a facade of brick in common bond and is arranged in a roughly rectangular shape, with its longer axis running north-south. It has a two-story primary facade on Bradhurst Avenue to the east and a one-story rear facade facing the pool to the west. The rear facade corresponds to the second story of the bathhouse. The bathhouse is designed with cylindrical shapes and Romanesque details. The decorative elements include stone corbels, courses, window sills, and rooftop balustrades. The design, more ornate than the other ten pools built as part of the same 1936 WPA program, has been compared to a medieval fortification.

The eastern facade is composed of fourteen bays, which are separated by protruding cylindrical buttresses and contain recessed arches. The two central bays, which form the main entrance, are flanked by large cylindrical buttresses and separated by a smaller buttress. Each of the central bays contains a wide arch, a bas-relief related to swimming, a comparatively small doorway, and faded letters reading colonial park and play center. The six bays on either side contain narrower arches separated by small full-height buttresses. Inside the narrower arches are various windows and doors, arranged according to the interior use. The ends of the bathhouse contain large cylindrical buttresses similar to those flanking the main entrance. The southern facade has a brick wall with windows, while the northern facade has two arches. The western facade contains fourteen bays and is a simpler version of its counterpart on the east.

The recreation center was intended to double as a bathhouse and an enclosed play area. The ground-floor lobby of the recreation center contains a glass ticket booth between the two main doorways, where visitors originally purchased tickets for admission to the pool. The ceiling is made of pointed Gothic arches. The ground-floor spaces north and south of the lobby are used for mechanical spaces. On the northwest and southwest corners of the lobby, two staircases with rounded risers lead up to the second floor, providing access to the men's and women's locker rooms and to the pool. There is also a bust of Jackie Robinson, the park's namesake and the first Black player in Major League Baseball, on the west wall. The bust was made by Inge Hardison and installed in 1981. The rest of the recreation center contains facilities including an indoor basketball court, cardio room, fitness room, gymnasium, media lab, and multipurpose room.

=== Paths and other structures ===
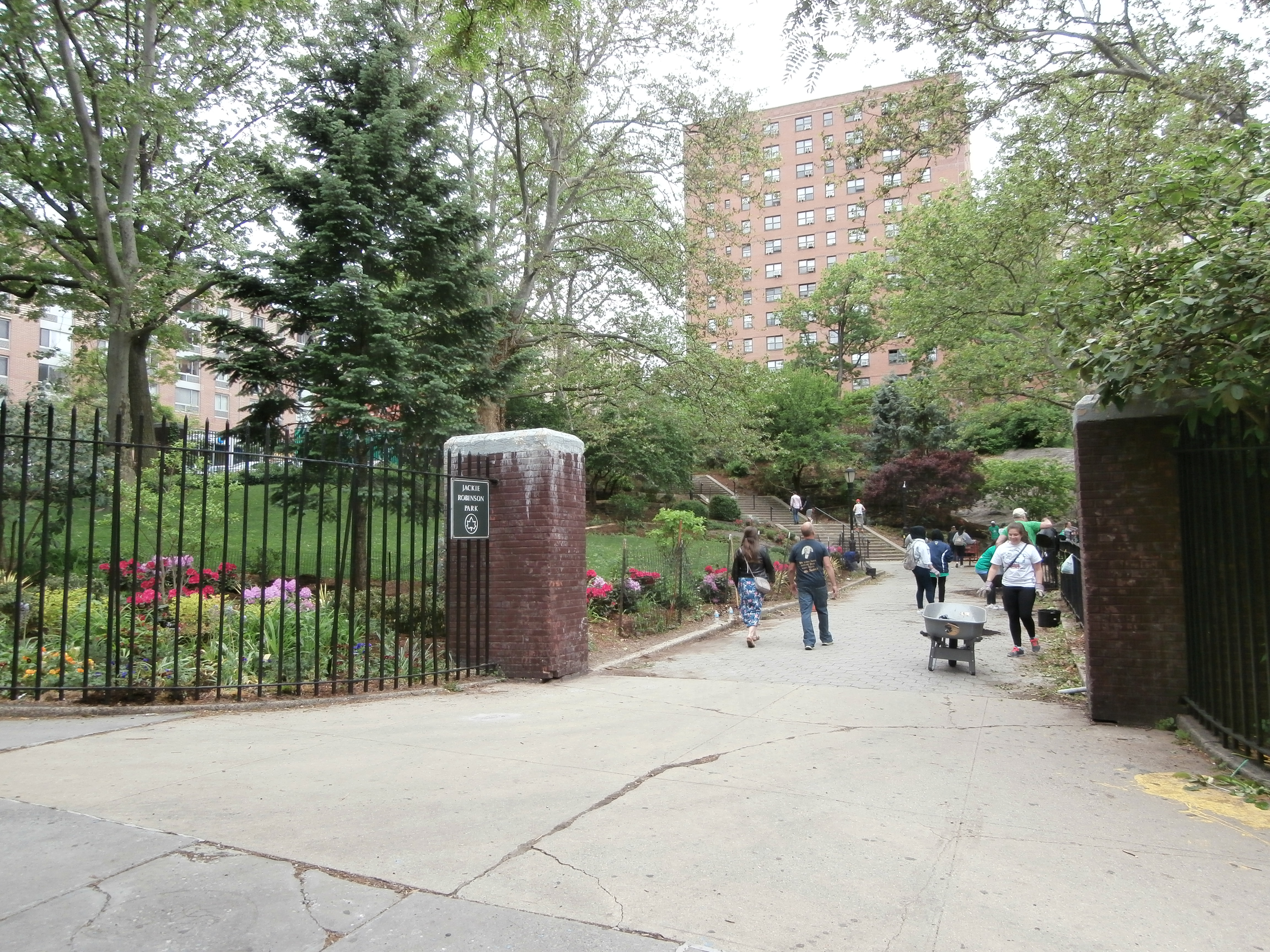
One of the park entrances

At 147th Street is an open-air concrete bandshell, which is built into the hillside and faces a dance floor terrace to the east. The interior of the bandshell contains a mural depicting Robinson. The Robinson mural was painted in 2006 by the Junior League of New York. The dance floor terrace, a wide space with a floor of hexagonal stone pavers, extends north to 148th Street. The terrace is enclosed by a brick retaining wall featuring rounded seating niches with concrete benches, which in turn are separated by brick cylinders with stone caps. North of the dance floor terrace is a wide promenade with hexagonal-block pavers, extending to the recreational fields at 150th Street. The western retaining wall of the promenade contains rounded seating niches similar to those in the dance floor terrace.

A curved concrete stair, which separates the dance floor terrace to the south and the promenade to the north, leads upward from 148th Street and Bradhurst Avenue to a landing at Edgecombe Avenue, just south of 150th Street. A path winds upward from the intersection of 150th Street and Bradhurst Avenue to the same landing. An additional path leads from 153rd Street at Bradhurst Avenue to Edgecombe Avenue's intersection with 155th Street and the 155th Street Viaduct. The paths predate the WPA renovations in 1936. The WPA removed some of the original paths to make way for the recreational fields, while repaving these paths with hexagonal pavers. Some of the paths subsequently were repaved in asphalt.

There are two comfort stations, or restrooms, within the park. The comfort station adjoining the playground at 152nd Street is a single-story square structure with a hip roof, oriented 45 degrees from the surrounding streets. The brick facade contains large cylinders at each corner, with segmental arches between each cylinder. The other comfort station, adjoining the playground at 149th Street, is a single-story rectangular structure with a gable roof. The brick structure was built prior to the WPA renovations. Additionally, the southern boundary of the park contains a metal fence with brick piers capped with stone.

== History ==
The park site occupies a high bluff formed by retreating glaciers. The area that later became Colonial Park was part of the Samuel Bradhurst estate in the late 18th and early 19th centuries. Brick buildings lined its southern edge and a few small residences were scattered throughout its interior in the early 1890s.

=== Creation ===
The act creating Colonial Park and the nearby St. Nicholas Park was passed on February 26, 1894. Edgecombe Road (later Avenue), which would form Colonial Park's western border, had not been drawn through the street grid, but was slated to be halfway between St. Nicholas Avenue to the west and Bradhurst Avenue to the east. A group of three commissioners was appointed to oversee land acquisition. Due to various legal disputes, the land acquisition was not completed until 1899. The land acquisition was estimated to cost $1.5 million for 192 parcels, although the New York City government initially opposed the appropriations, stating that some plots were valued at much higher prices than they were actually worth. Colonial Park, and later Colonial Pool, were so named because several American Revolutionary War battles had taken place in the area.

During the first decade of the 20th century, the New York City government converted the land into a park. The northern half of the park, from 150th to 155th Streets, was laid out with paths and plantings in 1907 and 1908. The southern half, containing a playground and a restroom, opened to the public on August 12, 1911. The work had cost $2 million in total. In the years after Colonial Park's opening, the area to the west became known as Sugar Hill, a popular place for wealthy Black Americans to live during the Harlem Renaissance. One development within that area was the Colonial Park Apartments at 409 Edgecombe Avenue, which contained the residences of figures such as W. E. B. Du Bois and Thurgood Marshall. Colonial Park itself was used informally for concerts in its early years. Few improvements were made to the park in the two decades following its opening; in the early 1930s, it still retained its original playground, restroom, and paths.

=== Works Progress Administration renovations ===
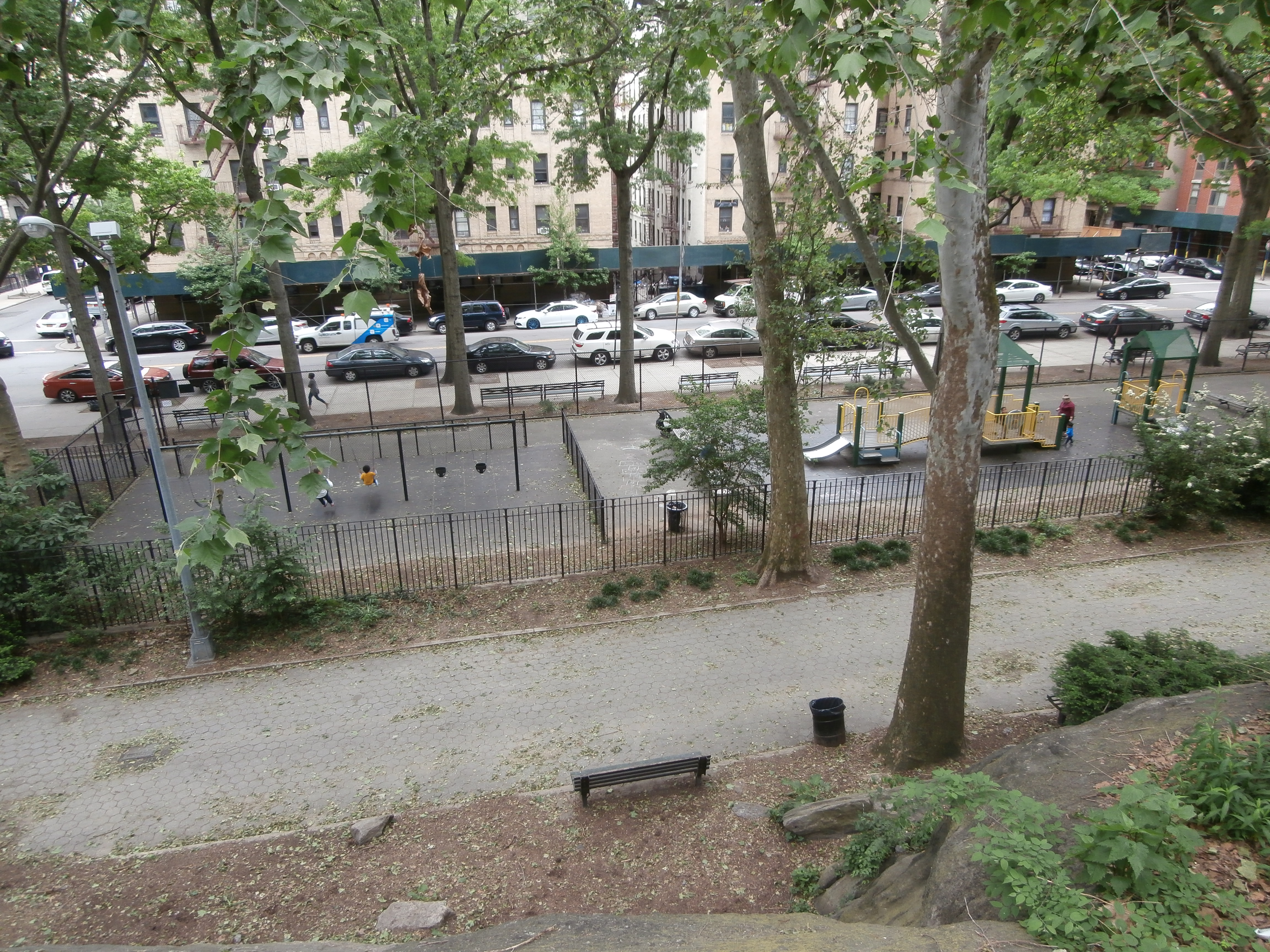
Playground One Forty Nine CIL, at 149th Street

In 1934, mayor Fiorello H. La Guardia nominated Robert Moses to become commissioner of a unified New York City Department of Parks and Recreation. At the time, the United States was experiencing the Great Depression; immediately after La Guardia won the 1933 election, Moses began to write "a plan for putting 80,000 men to work on 1,700 relief projects". By the time he was in office, several hundred such projects were underway across the city.

Moses was especially interested in creating new pools and other bathing facilities, such as those in Jacob Riis Park, Jones Beach, and Orchard Beach. He devised a list of 23 pools around the city, including one in Harlem. The pools would be built using funds from the Works Progress Administration (WPA), a federal agency created as part of the New Deal to combat the Depression's negative effects. Eleven of these pools were to be designed concurrently and open in 1936. Moses, along with the architects Aymar Embury II and Gilmore David Clarke, created a common design for these aquatic centers. Each location was to have distinct pools for diving, swimming, and wading; bleachers and viewing areas; and bathhouses with locker rooms that could be used as gymnasiums. The pools were to have several common features, such as a minimum 55-yard (50 m) length, underwater lighting, heating, and filtration, all constructed using inexpensive materials. To fit the requirement for efficiency and low-cost construction, each building would be built using elements of the Streamline Moderne and Classical architectural styles. The buildings would also be near "comfort stations", additional playgrounds, and spruced-up landscapes.

Construction for some of the 11 pools began in October 1934. In mid-1935, Moses announced that Colonial Park, which then contained an informal layout, would receive a recreational center with a swimming pool and sporting fields. An official press release stated that the city had failed to assemble another large site elsewhere in Harlem, but author Marta Gutman stated that Marcus Garvey Park in Central Harlem had been considered until the Harlem riot of 1935. It is unknown whether Moses's racial views may have factored into the site's selection. Authors Steven Riess and Jeff Wiltse have alleged that the pool in Colonial Park, serving a largely Black neighborhood, was in an inconvenient location compared to other pools in largely white neighborhoods. Gutman writes that the Colonial Park Pool was used mostly by Black and Hispanic residents, while Harlem's other pool at Thomas Jefferson Park was used mostly by white residents of Italian Harlem.

Embury filed construction plans for the bathhouse in October 1935, and a temporary bandshell was built the same year. The first improvement to be completed at Colonial Park was the playground at 152nd Street, which opened in April 1936. By mid-1936, ten of the eleven WPA-funded pools were completed and were being opened at a rate of one per week. The Colonial Park Pool was the tenth of these pools to open, (Note: The pools opened in the following chronological order: Hamilton Fish Park, Thomas Jefferson Park, Astoria Park, Tompkinsville Pool, Highbridge Park, Sunset Park, Crotona Park, McCarren Park, Betsy Head Park, Colonial Park, and Red Hook Park.) although, at the time, the bathhouse was only partially completed. The pool opened on August 8, 1936, with performances by Bojangles Robinson and the 369th Regiment Band; the ceremony was attended by over 25,000 people. Additional ballfields and courts were opened in October 1936, without any formal ceremony. The bandshell and dance terrace opened in July 1937, followed by the playground at 149th Street that October.

=== Decline and renovations ===
After the completion of the WPA improvements in Colonial Park, the facilities saw relatively few improvements, aside from periodic renovations. Both the diving pool and the wading pool were infilled at an unknown date. By the 1970s, Jackie Robinson Park and other city parks were in poor condition following the 1975 New York City fiscal crisis. NYC Parks commenced a project to restore the pools in several parks in 1977, including at Jackie Robinson Park, for whose restoration the agency set aside an estimated $2.6 million. The pool closed for renovation in 1978, and the park was renamed after Jackie Robinson the same year. The pool reopened in July 1980 after a $2.6 million renovation funded partially by the United States federal government.

NYC Parks continued to face financial shortfalls in the coming years, and the pools retained a reputation for high crime. For the summer of 1991, mayor David Dinkins had planned to close all 32 outdoor pools in the city, a decision that was only reversed after a $2 million donation from a trust created upon the death of real estate developer Sol Goldman and $1.8 million from other sources. Additionally, in the 1990s, a practice called "whirlpooling" became common in New York City pools such as Jackie Robinson Park, in which women would be inappropriately fondled by teenage boys. By the turn of the century, crimes such as sexual assaults had decreased in parks citywide due to increased security. Volunteers had also started planting greenery within Jackie Robinson Park by the end of the 1990s. In early 2000, NYC Parks completed a $1.3 million renovation, which included improvements to its playgrounds.

In 2007, the New York City Landmarks Preservation Commission (LPC) designated Jackie Robinson Park, including the pool and play center, as a landmark. The commission had previously considered the pool for landmark status in 1990, along with the other ten WPA pools in the city. A $2 million renovation of the bandshell was completed in 2009. NYC Parks announced further renovations in 2016 as part of a $40 million program to renovate eight parks around the city. Of this, $4.7 million was allocated to improvements at Jackie Robinson Park. Because the park was a city landmark, LPC permission was needed for aspects of the renovation, such as a proposed replacement of the fences. The project was completed in 2020 and included modifications to the entrances, paths, lights, and other circulation features.

== See also ==
- List of New York City Designated Landmarks in Manhattan above 110th Street
