= Red Hook Park =

Public park in Brooklyn, New York

Red Hook Recreation Area
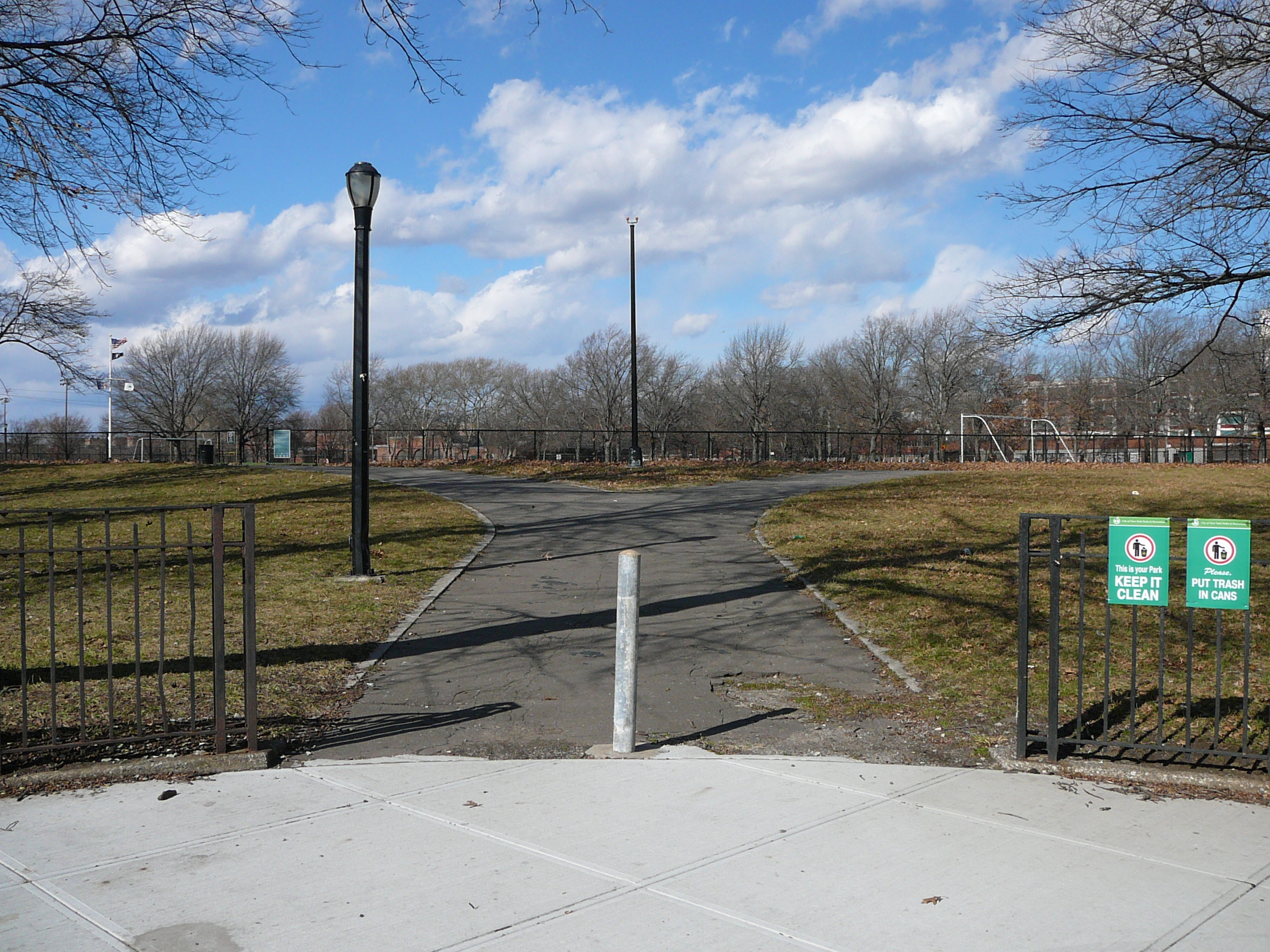
- Interactive map of Red Hook Recreation Area
- Location: Red Hook, Brooklyn, New York
- Coordinates: 40°40′22″N 74°00′14″W
- Area: 58.5 acres (23.7 ha)
- Created: 1936 (pool), 1940 (park)
- Operator: New York City Department of Parks and Recreation
- Status: open
- Public transit: New York City Subway: Smith–Ninth Streets ( trains); New York City Bus: B57, B61

New York City Landmark
- Designated: June 26, 2007
- Reference no.: 2241
- Designated entity: Bathhouse facade and pool
- Superfund site

Information
- CERCLIS ID: NYN000202712, NYN000206593
- Contaminants: Lead
- Responsible parties: Columbia Smelting & Refining Works

Progress

Red Hook Recreation Area, also known as Red Hook Park, is a 58.5-acre (237,000 m^{2}) public park in the Red Hook neighborhood of Brooklyn, New York City, composed of several segments centered around Bay Street. The park's recreational facilities include handball courts, softball fields, a soccer and football field, and a running track. The Sol Goldman Play Center, within the block bounded by Bay, Henry, Lorraine and Clinton Streets, consists of a brick bathhouse and two pools. The park is operated by the New York City Department of Parks and Recreation, also known as NYC Parks.

The land for the park was acquired starting in 1913 and was transferred to NYC Parks in 1934. Joseph L. Hautman designed the pool, which was constructed from 1935 to 1936 as part of a Works Progress Administration project. The rest of the park opened in 1940. The pool was extensively refurbished from 1983 to 1986; it was renamed for Sol Goldman in 1991 after he donated funds to keep the pool open. The New York City Landmarks Preservation Commission designated the Sol Goldman Play Center as a city landmark in 2007. As a result of extensive lead contamination, the fields were closed and renovated in phases starting in 2019.

== Description ==
=== Recreation fields ===
Red Hook Park is in several non-contiguous plots of unequal size, totaling 58 acres (23 ha). The largest plot is bounded by Columbia Street to the west, Clinton Street to the east, and Bay Street to the north. It contains four soccer fields, labeled 2–5, and five baseball fields, labeled 1–4 and 9.

Red Hook Park also occupies part or all of five other city blocks to the east and north of the park's main section. Directly across from Clinton Street, extending east to Court Street and south to Halleck Street, is a recreational area containing soccer field 1 and walking paths. The block to the northwest, bounded by Creamer, Court, Bay, and Clinton Streets, contains soccer field 6 and a running track. The track, which is 1/6 mile (0.27 km) long, encircled a roller rink when it opened in 1940. The park also occupies two whole city blocks between Bay Street to the south and Lorraine Street to the north. The block between Hicks Street on the west and Henry Street on the east contains ball fields 5–8 and soccer field 7, while the block between Henry Street on the west and Clinton Street on the east contains the Sol Goldman Pool.

The Bush-Clinton Playground, containing several basketball courts and a play area, is north of the pool adjacent to Red Hook Houses. The northern boundary of the Bush-Clinton Playground is on the axis of Bush Street, named for a prominent family in the area, while the eastern boundary is on Clinton Street, named for New York governor DeWitt Clinton. This playground used to contain a wading pool on the site of the basketball courts.

=== Red Hook Play Center ===
The Red Hook Play Center consists of the Sol Goldman Pool and Bathhouse, which are on the city block bounded clockwise from south by Bay, Henry, Lorraine and Clinton Streets. The bathhouse is on the southern end of the block, facing Bay Street. The pool occupies the remainder of the block. The complex was built from 1934 to 1936 in the Art Moderne style, during the Fiorello LaGuardia administration. The supervising architect was Aymar Embury II, and the landscape architect was Gilmore D. Clarke, among others.

==== Bathhouse ====
The bathhouse contains a facade of brick in Flemish bond and is shaped in a "C" with a 1 1/2-story central pavilion, flanked by west and east wings that are separated from the street by a grass strip. The main entrance to the bath house is approached by two short flights of granite steps from Bay Street, though there is also a handicap-accessible ramp east of the steps. The bottom of the stairs is flanked by low piers and has a planting bed to the west. It leads directly to the rotunda. A back entrance, from the north, leads directly to the swimming pool. The top of the building facade is wrapped with a simple cast-stone band, while the bottom sits on a water table of granite blocks.

The central pavilion, built in the 1986 renovation, is similar in design to the original bathhouses on the west and east. The southern facade contains three arches separated by sloped brick buttresses, with hopper windows in the top sections of the arches. Metal letters with the words sol goldman/recreation center & pool/red hook park are mounted above the central arch. The main entrance consists of a set of metal doors in the lowest section of the central arch. The northern facade of the central pavilion contains three hopper windows, each of which is topped by a relief panel. The windows and relief panels are flanked by a pair of doors.

The west wing is for men and the east wing is for women, but otherwise are similarly designed. Both wings are divided into three sections from west to east. The innermost sections, next to the central pavilion, are each one story tall and have a small cube-shaped pavilion extending south to the Bay Street sidewalk. The central portions of each wing are one and a half stories tall, containing three archways on the southern facade. The outermost sections of each wing have four hopper windows on the southern facade. The western facade of the west wing, and the eastern facade of the east wing, each have three hopper windows. The extreme ends of each wing extend northward to form arcades, each composed of three arches. The west wing's arcade was designed to provide direct access from Henry Street while the east wing's arcade was designed to provide direct access from Clinton Street. The northern facades of both wings each have six buttresses, with hopper windows between each buttress, as well as carved stone lintels above the northern doorways from each wing.

==== Pools ====
The pool complex consists of two pools, surrounded by a concrete deck. The main pool, in the center of the block, is rectangular and oriented from east to west. It measures 130 by 330 feet (40 by 101 m), the same dimensions it had when it was completed, with a depth of 4 feet (1.2 m). The pool can fit 1,716 swimmers and, until its 1986 renovation, contained water circulation fountains in its center. The northern part of the deck contains concrete bleachers with seven rows, separating the main and wading pools.

The wading pool, formerly the diving pool, is in the northern third of the block. When completed, the diving pool measured 65 by 150 feet (20 by 46 m). In 1986, it was largely infilled with brick, and pole sprinklers were installed for children.

A curving fence with brick piers, as well as a planted glass strip, runs around the western and eastern sides of the pool complex. A one-story comfort station is on the northwestern corner of the block; it is slightly above street level and formerly had men's and women's restrooms. A one-story brick storage closet is on the northeastern corner, at street level. The structures, both connected by a solid brick wall on the northern side of the pool complex, are largely similar in design: each has a segmental arch on the north side and a stone coping below their respective roofs.

== History ==
=== Site ===
In the mid-19th century, the Red Hook neighborhood was a major shipping hub. Several shipping basins were constructed along the waterfront during this time. According to the 1886 Sanborn Fire Insurance Map, there were two basins on the park site: the Henry Street Basin, continuing as far inland as Bay Street, and Hicks Street Basin, only going as far as Halleck Street. A 1904 version of this map showed that the bulkhead lines of these basins had been finalized.

The specific site of the Red Hook Recreation Area was originally intended as a terminal for the Marginal Elevated Railway, a shortline railroad connecting the industries along the Brooklyn waterfront. The railroad would have used an elevated viaduct, similar to the High Line in Manhattan, between Bush Terminal and the piers at Fulton Ferry Landing (now Brooklyn Bridge Park) in Brooklyn Heights. Land for a freight rail terminal in Red Hook, near the Erie Basin, was acquired in October 1913. Although discussions for the marginal railroad continued through the 1910s and 1920s, it was never built. The city retained ownership of some 40 acres (16 ha) at the site of the unbuilt terminal, and was looking to sell and subdivide the land by 1930, to some opposition.

North of the abandoned terminal, the block bounded by Bay, Lorraine, Henry, and Clinton Streets was used as a baseball field from 1915 to about 1929. During the 1920s and 1930s, the block to the west had housed the Columbia Smelting & Refining Works, although the refinery was destroyed by 1940. The site of soccer field 6, east of the swimming pool, was occupied by a junk yard and several old building foundations.

=== Works Progress Administration ===
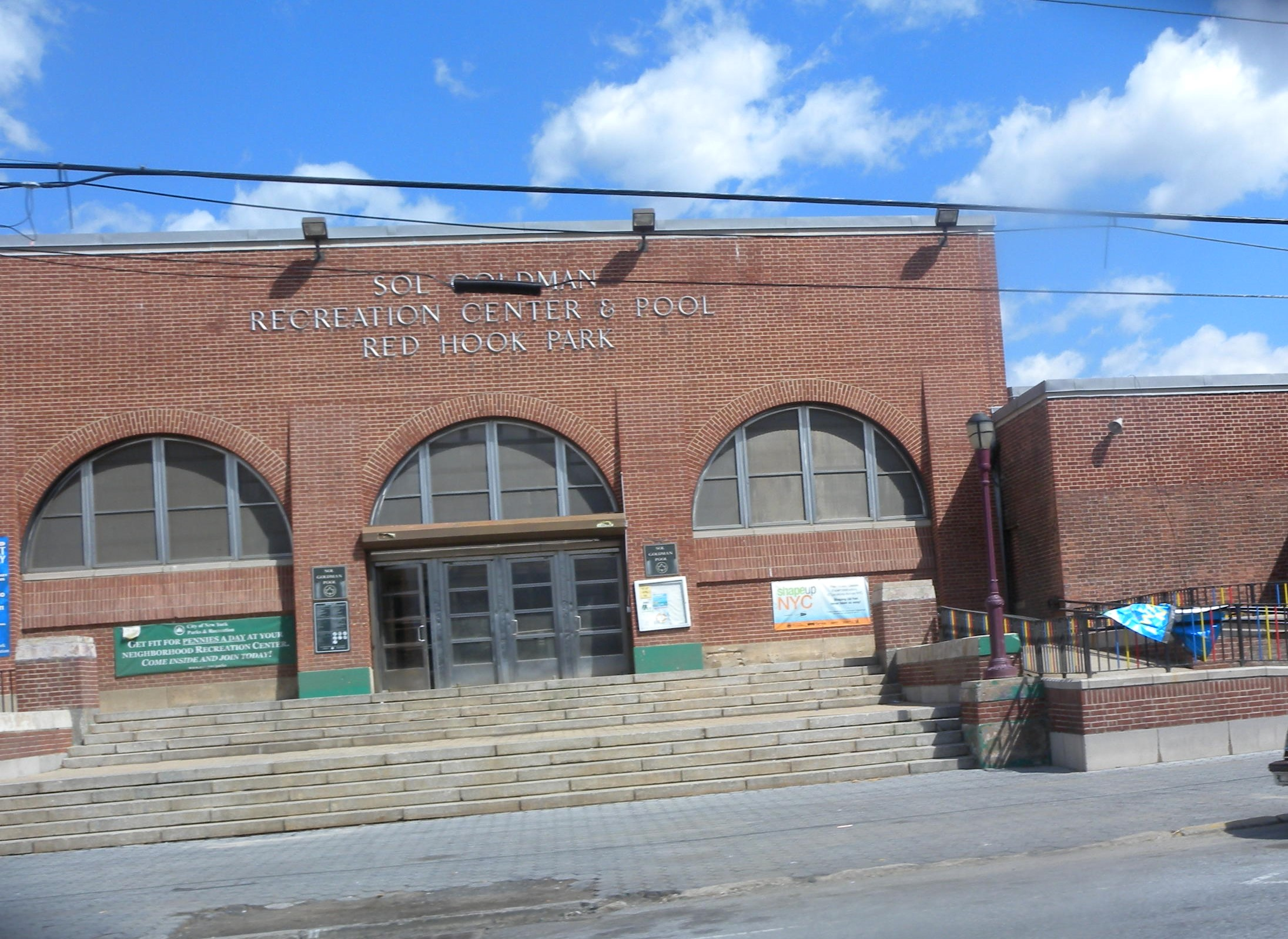
Sol Goldman Play Center

In 1934, mayor Fiorello H. La Guardia nominated Robert Moses to become commissioner of a unified New York City Department of Parks and Recreation. At the time, the United States was experiencing the Great Depression; immediately after La Guardia won the 1933 election, Moses began to write "a plan for putting 80,000 men to work on 1,700 relief projects". By the time he was in office, several hundred such projects were underway across the city.

Moses was especially interested in creating new pools and other bathing facilities, such as those in Jacob Riis Park, Jones Beach, and Orchard Beach. He devised a list of 23 pools around the city, including one at the Red Hook terminal site. The pools would be built using funds from the Works Progress Administration (WPA), a federal agency created as part of the New Deal to combat the Depression's negative effects. Eleven of these pools were to be designed concurrently and open in 1936. Moses, along with the architects Aymar Embury II and Gilmore David Clarke, created a common design for each of the 11 proposed aquatic centers. Each location was to have distinct pools for diving, swimming, and wading; bleachers and viewing areas; and bathhouses with locker rooms that could be used as gymnasiums. The pools were to have several common features, such as a minimum 55-yard (50 m) length, underwater lighting, heating, and filtration, all constructed using inexpensive materials. To fit the requirement for efficiency and low-cost construction, each building would be built using elements of the Streamline Moderne and Classical architectural styles. The buildings would also be near "comfort stations", additional playgrounds, and spruced-up landscapes.

Unlike most projects of the era, the Red Hook Pool and Recreation Area would be constructed as a completely new facility, with the park to be developed later. Moses originally planned to use the terminal site as a play area, but 38 acres (15 ha) of the site were turned over to the New York City Housing Authority in March 1934 for a housing development. This land transfer was made upon the request of housing commissioner Langdon W. Post, who claimed the site was needed for the housing development, which had just received federal funding. Post promised that some parkland would be provided on the site. On June 2 of that year, Post granted 15 acres (6.1 ha) back to NYC Parks. Moses rejected this land transfer on June 22 to protest the fact that, under the terms of the grant, the plot could be taken back on thirty days' notice. Less than a week later, on June 28, the site was granted to NYC Parks without that stipulation.

Construction for some of the 11 pools began in October 1934. The Red Hook Pool's bathhouse was designed by Joseph L. Hautman, despite being often attributed to Embury. The landscape was designed by Gilmore David Clarke, who also designed the landscape around the Red Hook Houses. The architects submitted plans for the Red Hook Play Center to the New York City Department of Buildings in early 1936. These plans called for swimming, wading, and diving pools, as well as a pair of bathhouses with room for 4,462 guests. By mid-1936, ten of the eleven WPA-funded pools were completed and were being opened at a rate of one per week. The Red Hook Pool was the last of these pools to open. (Note: The pools opened in the following chronological order: Hamilton Fish Park, Thomas Jefferson Park, Astoria Park, Tompkinsville Pool, Highbridge Park, Sunset Park, Crotona Park, McCarren Park, Betsy Head Park, Colonial Park, and Red Hook Park.) The official ceremony, occurring on August 18, 1936, was attended by over 50,000 people. (Note: According to an article in The New York Times, there were 40,000 attendees. That article is also cited by the New York City Landmarks Preservation Commission.) At the time of the main pool's opening, the bathhouses were not completed. Plans for the original wading pool, north of the main pool, were not even submitted until March 1937. By that June, the wading pool's completion was delayed because staff had been diverted to the construction of facilities at Jacob Riis Park. According to a NYC Parks press release, the permanent facilities at the Red Hook Recreation Center were completed in time for the 1937 summer season.

The Red Hook Recreation Area was also constructed by the WPA on land near the pool. When the Red Hook Houses project started in 1938, Moses was developing the 40-acre site south of the Red Hook Houses as part of the recreation area. That year, $723,250 was allocated to a reconstruction of the playground along Gowanus Bay at the end of Henry Street. A field and running track between Creamer, Court, Bay, and Clinton Streets opened in July 1940. By the end of that year, some 35 acres (14 ha) of parkland had been developed with 20 acres (8.1 ha) under construction. The park had 18 tennis courts and a roller rink that could be converted to an ice rink during winter. During the off-season, the main pool could be drained and turned into various sporting courts. Further plots for the recreation area would be acquired by NYC Parks through 1947.

=== 20th century ===
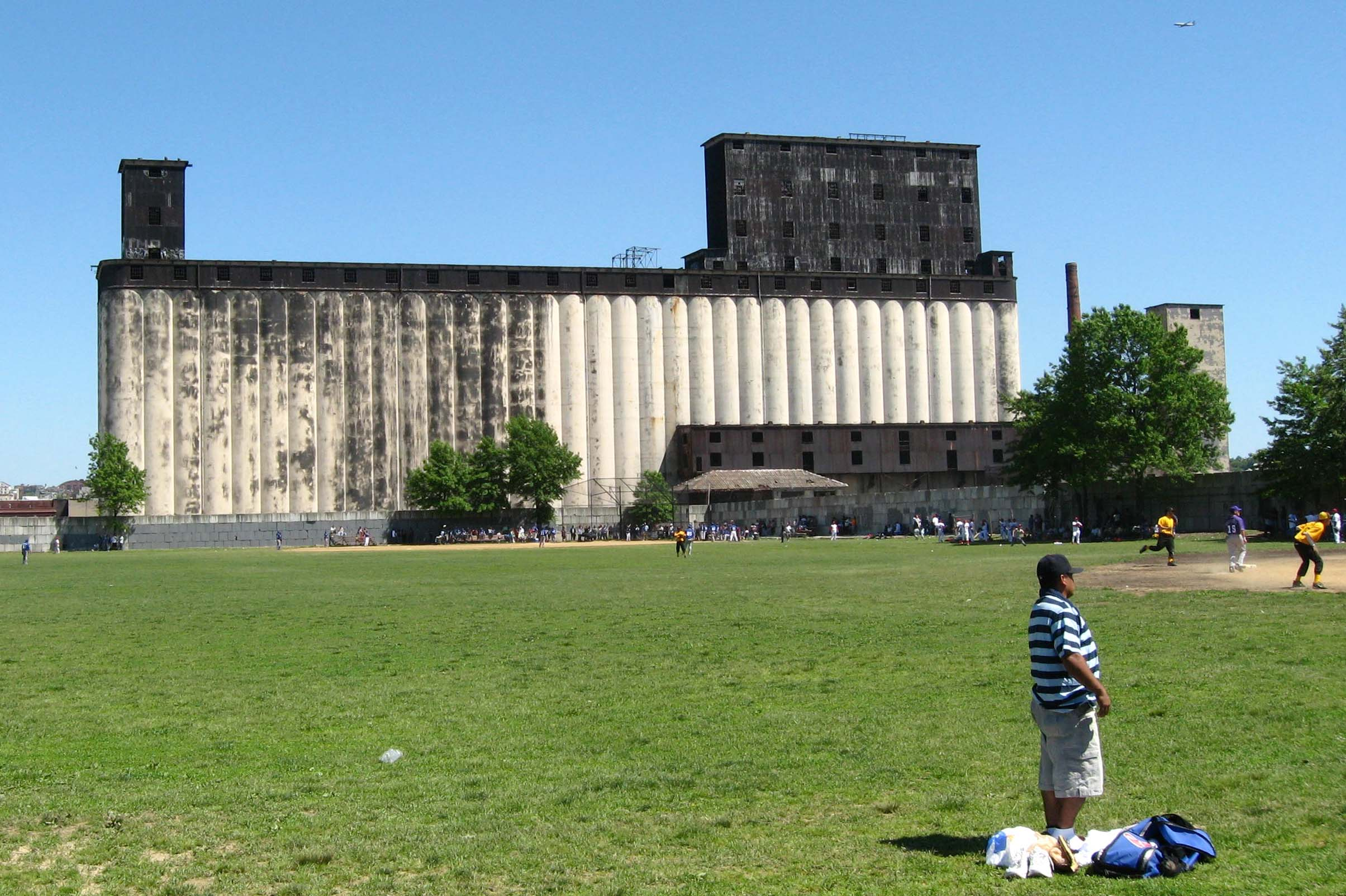
Grain storage facility next to the southern part of Red Hook Park

During the mid-20th century, the Red Hook neighborhood went into decline. In the 1940s, Moses designed and built the Gowanus Parkway, isolating the neighborhood from the remainder of Brooklyn. The shipping industry relocated to other sites in Brooklyn or to New Jersey starting in the 1950s. The neighborhood, which had 18,000 residents in 1960, had lost nearly half of its population by 1980. One factor in this decline was the lack of cultural institutions, such as theaters, in the neighborhood. By the 1970s, Red Hook Park and other city parks were in poor condition following the 1975 New York City fiscal crisis. NYC Parks commenced a project to restore the pools in several parks in 1977. These projects were not carried out due to a lack of money. By March 1981, NYC Parks had only 2,900 employees in its total staff, less than 10 percent of the 30,000 present when Moses was parks commissioner. In 1982, the NYC Parks budget increased greatly, enabling the agency to carry out $76 million worth of restoration projects by year's end; among these projects was a restoration of Red Hook Park.

Plans for the pool center's renovations were filed with the Department of Buildings in 1983. As part of the renovation, the building was restored, and an annex was built to connect the standalone men's and women's bathhouses. In addition, the diving pool became a wading pool by around 1985. The $9.5 million renovation of the pool center was completed in 1986, while the pool opened in time for the 1987 summer season. The park officially became known as Red Hook Recreation Center upon the completion of the pool center's renovation. At the time, NYC Parks was planning a $7.6 million renovation of the track and field facilities.

NYC Parks continued to face financial shortfalls in the coming years, and the pools retained a reputation for high crime. For the summer of 1991, mayor David Dinkins had planned to close all 32 outdoor pools in the city, a decision that was only reversed after a $2 million donation from a trust created upon the death of real estate developer Sol Goldman and $1.8 million from other sources. The Red Hook Pool was renamed after Goldman that year in honor of his donation. In conjunction with the 1994 FIFA World Cup, the government of Norway donated a 45-by-65-foot (14 by 20 m) soccer field to Red Hook Park. The all-weather artificial turf field, set up within the unused wading pool, was dedicated in June 1994 and was destroyed by arson ten days after its dedication. The field had cost $80,000 (equivalent to $174,000 in 2025) and, according to witnesses, was destroyed by one or more local youths in broad daylight, though it was never investigated by police. Additionally, in the 1990s, a practice called "whirlpooling" became common in New York City pools such as Red Hook Park, in which women would be inappropriately fondled by teenage boys. By the turn of the century, crimes such as sexual assaults had decreased in parks citywide due to increased security.

=== 21st century ===
In the early 21st century, Gowanus Industrial Park, a neighboring property owner who owned some of the land under the adjacent Henry Street Basin, erected a 200-foot-long (61 m), 18-foot-tall (5.5 m) metal fence along the section of the park facing the basin. The city government filed a lawsuit in 2005 to force the removal of the fence, and in 2008, the New York Supreme Court ruled that the fence had to be removed because it had been erected illegally. Also in 2008, the New York City Landmarks Preservation Commission designated the Red Hook Play Center as a landmark. The commission had previously considered the pool for landmark status in 1990, along with the other ten WPA pools in the city.

The city's health and parks departments tested soil samples on the block between Bay, Hicks, Lorraine, and Henry Streets in early 2012. They found that lead concentrations in the ballfields on that block, labeled as fields 5 through 8, were several times above acceptable levels. Despite the discovery of such high lead levels, only minor cleanup was performed on field 5. The park and pool center was damaged during Hurricane Sandy later in 2012, and solar panels were installed on the roof of the pool building the following year. Further lead testing was performed in late 2014 and early 2015. High lead levels were also found on the block between Clinton and Court Streets, but were deemed to be a less urgent danger because the lead concentrations were found below ground level.

In May 2015, ball fields 5–8 were closed indefinitely, pending soil remediation. The cleanup of the four fields, the first phase of a four-phase cleanup, was initially estimated to cost $105 million and be completed in 2018. However, in mid-2017, that deadline was pushed back to late 2019, and the cost of remediation increased. In mid-2018, the cleanup of fields 5–8 was further delayed to 2020. The first phase, consisting of the removal of contaminated soil from fields 5–8, began in early 2019. The project also involved rebuilding the fields above the floodplain. By January 2020, some 4,800 short tons (4,300 long tons; 4,400 t) of contaminated soil had been removed from the site. Due to the COVID-19 pandemic in New York City in 2020, some dates in the timeline were changed. As of January 2021, the first phase had been pushed back to mid-2021, followed by the second phase in late 2021, the third phase in 2022, and the fourth phase in 2023. By August 2021, all but two fields had been closed for remediation, and a fence had been erected around the Red Hook Recreation Area. Fields 5–8 finally reopened in April 2022, nearly seven years after they had closed.

Meanwhile, New York congresspeople allocated $8 million for repairs to the Red Hook Recreation Center in 2019. NYC Parks began looking for architects to redesign the recreation center in 2021; at the time, some of the damage from Hurricane Sandy had still not been fixed. The recreation center's boiler room was damaged in late 2021 during Hurricane Ida, forcing an indefinite closure of the facility. After an anonymous benefactor gave $115,000, the recreation center's gym was renovated, reopening in March 2023. The recreation center's media lab reopened in February 2024 following a $100,000 renovation.

== See also ==
- List of New York City Designated Landmarks in Brooklyn
