= Rao's =

Italian-American restaurant in East Harlem, New York City

Coordinates: 40°47′38.16″N 73°56′3.2″W

- Interactive map of Rao's

Restaurant information
- Established: 1896; 130 years ago
- Food type: Italian-American
- Location: 455 East 114th Street (at Pleasant Avenue), Italian Harlem, Manhattan, New York City, New York, 10029, United States
- Website: raosrestaurants.com

Rao's (/ˈreɪoʊz/) is an Italian-American restaurant founded in 1896. It is located at 455 East 114th Street, on the corner of Pleasant Avenue in East Harlem (or Italian Harlem), New York City. Rao's has a sister restaurant in Miami Beach.

== History ==
The restaurant was started in 1896 by Joshua Anthony Rao, who moved with his parents from Italy to the United States. He bought a small shop in Italian Harlem, once a very large Italian-American community, and ran the restaurant until his death in 1909. His sons Vincent and Louis Rao took over the business.

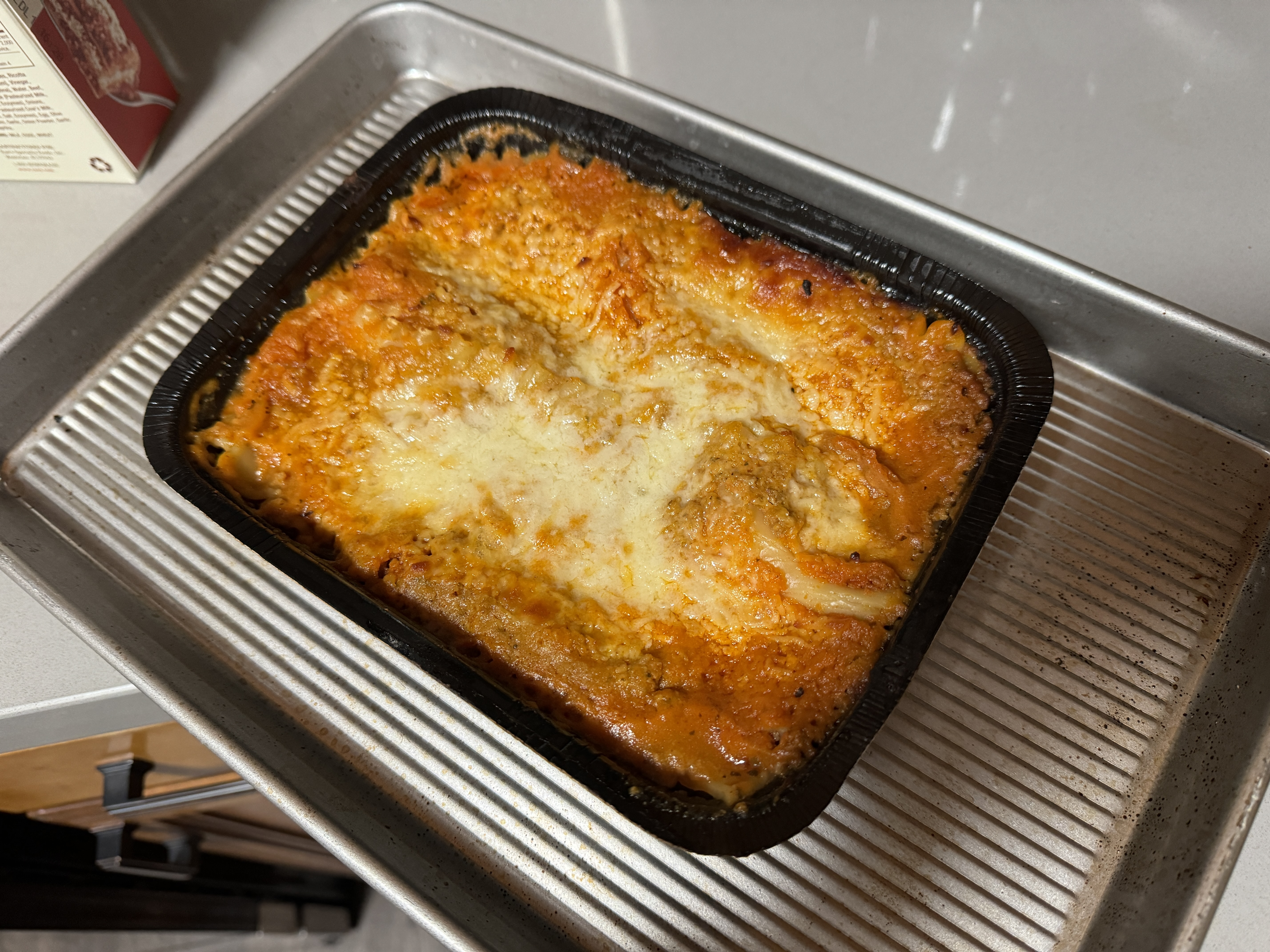
A Rao's Made For Home Meat Lasagna out of the oven.

In 1992 Rao's began selling products in gourmet markets and supermarkets. Products include pasta, sauces and olive oil.

Italian Harlem culture is still kept alive by Rao's and the Giglio Society of East Harlem. Every year on the second weekend of August in honor of the beginning of the school year, the Feast of Our Lady of Mount Carmel and the "Dancing of the Giglio" is performed while thousands of visitors and onlookers celebrate the once largest Italian community in New York City.

The New York Post describes the restaurant as "one of the hardest places to get into in the city". Notable patrons have included John Gotti, Rudy Giuliani, Robert De Niro, and Bo Dietl.

=== Other locations ===
In December 2006, Rao's opened a second restaurant in Las Vegas at Caesars Palace, under executive chef Carla Pellegrino, with two ten-table rooms and additional seating available on an outdoor garden patio. In early 2009, Rao's in Las Vegas opened a bocce bar outside and began offering bocce lessons and cocktails there. The Las Vegas location closed in 2021.

A third location, in Hollywood, Los Angeles, was announced by Frank Pellegrino Jr. on Late Night with Jimmy Fallon in July 2013. It opened in September of that year. The Los Angeles location closed on February 28, 2026, with the restaurant saying its lease was terminated after the Hollywood property had been sold.

In October 2023, a fourth location was opened at the Loews Hotel in South Beach, Miami.

== In media ==
=== Film ===
In the movie The Wolf of Wall Street, Jordan Belfort (Leonardo DiCaprio) is seen eating dinner in Rao's during a meeting with private investigator Bo Dietl.

Woody Allen and Mia Farrow regularly ate at Rao's in the 1980s. Mrs. Rao inspired the character Tina Vitale in his 1984 film Broadway Danny Rose.

Jars of Rao's sauce can be seen in the grocery store scene in the movie Christmas with the Kranks.

=== Music ===
In 2009, Jay-Z shot the music video for "D.O.A." (Death of Autotune) at Rao's.

=== Television ===
Rao's was the basis for "Raimondo's", a fictional restaurant featured as the site of a murder in the Law & Order episode "Everybody Loves Raimondo's." The owner of the fictional restaurant was played by actor Ray Abruzzo, who later co-starred with Pellegrino on The Sopranos. The episode was based on a shooting at the restaurant in 2003.

On Top Chef: All Stars, season 8, episode 8, an elimination challenge required the chefs to cook a three-course family-style Italian meal at Rao's restaurant for the judges and Rao's owners and staff.

On the season 7, episode 2 episode of Kitchen Nightmares, "Pantaleone's", Gordon Ramsay references Rao's as an example of a long-standing family-owned restaurant. In an effort to mend the relationship of a father and son who run Pantaleone's, a Denver-based pizza shop, Ramsay takes them to Rao's Las Vegas location to have a meal.

Rao's was profiled on the pilot episode of Guilty Pleasures as the home of Bobby Flay's favorite meal.

In season 7, episode 11 of the television show Billions, Bobby Axelrod takes an influential politician to Rao's for dinner.

== See also ==
- List of Italian restaurants
