= McCarren Park =

Public park in Brooklyn, New York

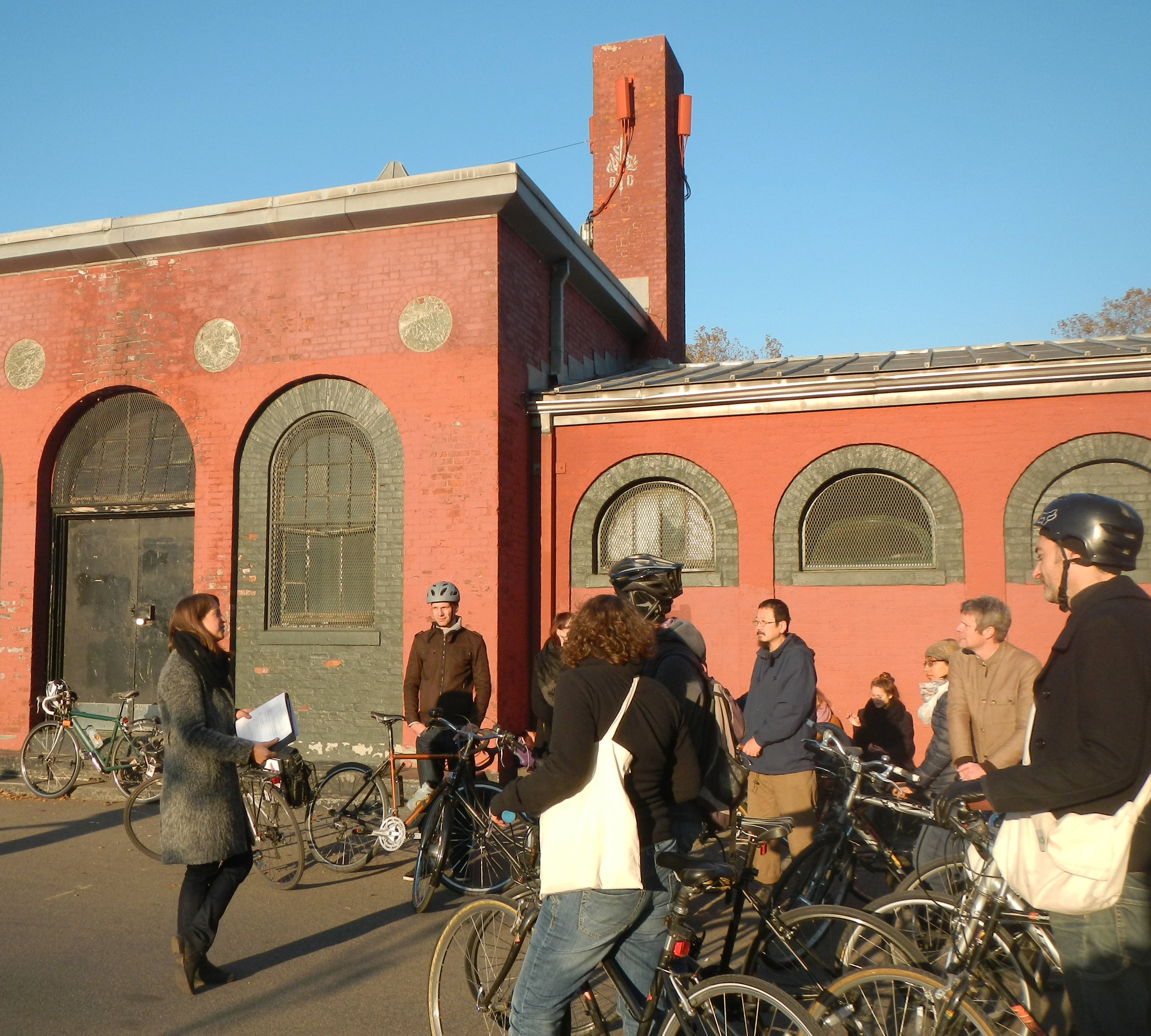
- Park house in northern part of park
- Interactive map of McCarren Park
- Type: Urban park
- Location: Williamsburg and Greenpoint, Brooklyn, New York City
- Coordinates: 40.721°N 73.952°W
- Created: New York City Department of Parks and Recreation
- Open: 6 a.m. to 1 a.m.
- Status: open all year

New York City Landmark
- Designated: June 26, 2007
- Reference no.: 2244
- Designated entity: Bathhouse facade and pool

McCarren Park is a public park in Brooklyn, New York City. It is located on the border of Williamsburg and Greenpoint and is bordered by Nassau Avenue, Bayard Street, Lorimer Street and North 12th Street. The park contains facilities for recreational softball, volleyball, soccer, handball, and other games. It is also used for sunbathing and dog-walking. It also includes the McCarren Play Center, which consists of a recreation center and a pool. McCarren Park is maintained by the New York City Department of Parks and Recreation (NYC Parks).

Opened in 1906 and originally named Greenpoint Park, the park was renamed McCarren Park in 1909 after State Senator Patrick H. McCarren (1849–1909), who eventually became the Democratic boss of Brooklyn. The pool was planned by Robert Moses and designed by Aymar Embury II during a Works Progress Administration project in 1935–1936. Although McCarren Pool was slated for renovation in the 1980s, it was instead closed due to opposition from the community. The McCarren Play Center was designated a city landmark by the New York City Landmarks Preservation Commission in 2007. The pool was used for concerts between 2005 and 2008, and the pool and play center were restored in 2012.

== Description ==
McCarren Park consists of 36 acres (15 ha) spread over four city blocks. The easternmost section of the park is a pentagonal city block bounded by Driggs Avenue to the north, Manhattan Avenue to the northeast, Leonard Street to the east, Bayard Street to the south, and Lorimer Street to the west. There are three additional sections of the park west of Lorimer Street. These sections are by Bayard Street to the south, North 12th Street to the southwest, Berry Street and Nassau Avenue to the northwest, and Lorimer Street to the east. These sections are crossed by Bedford Avenue and Driggs Avenue, which run from southwest to northeast.

The easternmost block contains the McCarren Play Center and the Vincent V. Abate Playground.

Events on the baseball fields of McCarren Park include members of the punk and indie communities gathering to participate in league-controlled kickball tournaments. For several years, the baseball fields have hosted tournament play for the Hasidim; weekend afternoons provide T-ball and softball games for organized area youth groups; Latino families and friends often utilize the fields to play soccer and volleyball into the late hours of the night.

=== McCarren Play Center ===
==== Bathhouse ====
The bathhouse is on the eastern sidewalk of Lorimer Street between Driggs Avenue and Bayard Street. The main entrance contains a stair overlooked by brick towers. The north tower contains the word mccarren and the south tower contains the words play center. The stairway contains granite sidewalls. At the top of the stair is a courtyard, which is spanned by two large arches and overlooked by a second-story balcony. In the courtyard, there is a bronze ornamental booth that sold tickets for the bathhouse. The inside walls of the courtyard and arches contain a mural by Mary Temple, Double Sun, which depicts shadows of trees. Although the mural was painted in 2016, the space was intended to be occupied by an artwork from the bathhouse's completion in 1936.

There are two identical pavilions to the north and south of the main bathhouse entrance, oriented on a north-south axis parallel to Lorimer Street. The northern pavilion houses the men's locker room while the southern pavilion houses the women's locker room. These pavilions each have a brick facade, a flat roof, and archways facing the central courtyard. Above both pavilions, a second story is set back from the east facade, originally serving as a viewing pavilion. There are "comfort stations" attached to the extreme ends of each pavilion, which face the pool to the east.

Several design features were installed in the bathhouse during the 2012 renovation of the pool. The bathhouse contains wooden planks that were salvaged in 2010 from the Riegelmann Boardwalk on Coney Island. Wire mesh baskets, rescued from storage, were placed on the bathhouse's ceiling.

==== Pools ====
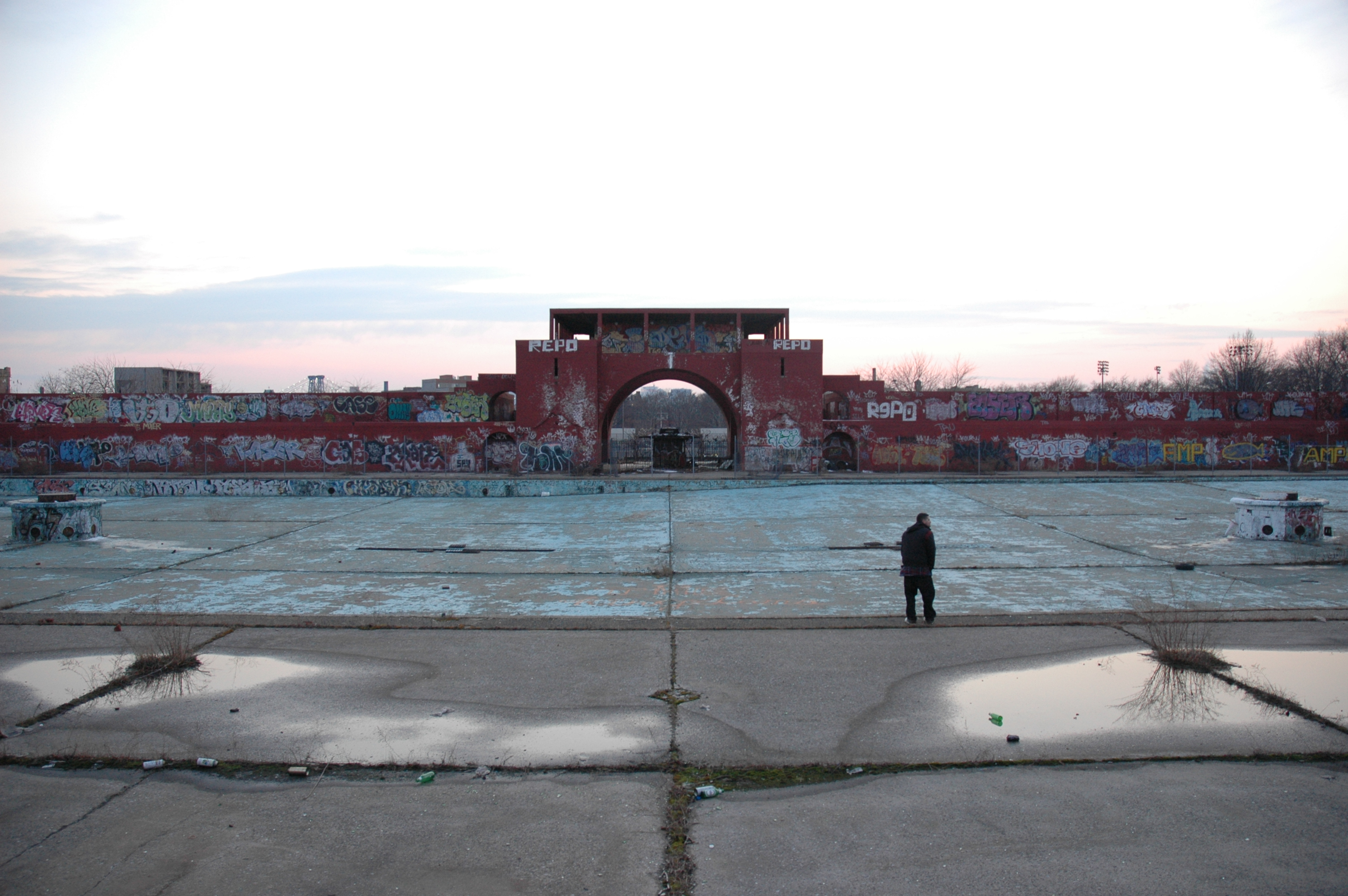
McCarren Park Pool, before renovations

East of the bathhouse, McCarren Park contains an enclosed elliptical pool area that is aligned north-south. The pool area is composed of a main swimming pool that was built as a 330-by-165-foot (101 by 50 m) rectangular pool. There were also two smaller, semicircular pools for wading and diving, one on either end of the main pool, though these are no longer in use. The original pool area, with an original capacity for 6,800 swimmers, served as the summertime social hub for Greenpoint and Williamsburg. The main pool was not used from 1984 to 2012. During that intermediate period, the pool was drained and left in disrepair, with various parts of the pool bed being graffitied. There was also a stage for performances on the east side of the pool during the 2000s.

After its restoration, the main pool was rearranged into a "C" shape, with the deck being extended into the western side of the pool. The rearranged pool covers 38,000 square feet (3,500 m^{2}) and consists of three sections. The north end of the "C" is intended as a children's area, with the deck sloping down into the pool. The central area was intended for general swimming. The south end of the "C" is marked with 25-meter-long (82 ft) lanes for the sport of swimming. The reconfigured pool can fit 1,500 swimmers and holds more than 1 million U.S. gallons (3,800,000 L; 830,000 imp gal).

The diving pool was to the south of the main rectangular pool, but has been infilled with dirt. A diving board existed at the site of the diving pool until 2010, when it was converted into a volleyball court. The wading pool, to the north of the main pool, has been infilled with concrete, and artificial rocks have been installed. The wading pool area is surrounded by an iron fence with an adjacent seating area

There are two structures along the pool's eastern side: the control room northeast of the pool and the lifeguard's station southeast of the pool. Both structures have a granite base, a bond-brick facade, and a hip roof overhanging the sides of each buildings. Both structures contain double doors as well as multi-pane casement windows. The structures are connected by a brick wall measuring 50 feet (15 m) long and 9 feet (2.7 m) tall, which contains engaged piers and is topped by a coping of cast stone. Along the connecting hall are concrete bleachers that face west toward the pool. The area under the pool contains numerous tunnels, including the pool complex's filter house. The filter house is able to circulate 6,080 U.S. gallons per minute (384 L/s).

== History ==
Until the 19th century, the site was occupied by a tributary of Bushwick Inlet. According to an 1854 account from the Brooklyn Eagle, the main tributary to McCarren Park formed the boundary between Williamsburg and Greenpoint. The New York City government acquired land for McCarren Park from 1903 to 1905. The park was known as Williamsburg Park from 1903 to 1906, then as Greenpoint Park until 1909, when it was renamed for Patrick Henry McCarren.

The city developed a boys' playground at Bedford and North 14th Streets, at the southern edge of the park, and a girls' playground at Manhattan and Driggs Avenues, at the northern edge. More facilities were opened in 1910, such as a playground, a running track, a seasonal ice rink, tennis courts, baseball fields, soccer fields, football fields, and a dancing platform. By 1930, a pool was also being planned at McCarren Park.

In 1928, the route of the New York City Subway's Crosstown Line was announced, with a tunnel running under the park. That tunnel opened in 1937.

=== Works Progress Administration renovations ===
In 1934, mayor Fiorello H. La Guardia nominated Robert Moses to become commissioner of a unified New York City Department of Parks and Recreation. At the time, the United States was experiencing the Great Depression; immediately after La Guardia won the 1933 election, Moses began to write "a plan for putting 80,000 men to work on 1,700 relief projects". By the time he was in office, several hundred such projects were underway across the city.

Moses was especially interested in creating new pools and other bathing facilities, such as those in Jacob Riis Park, Jones Beach, and Orchard Beach. He devised a list of 23 pools around the city, including one at McCarren Park. The pools would be built using funds from the Works Progress Administration (WPA), a federal agency created as part of the New Deal to combat the Depression's negative effects. Eleven of these pools were to be designed concurrently and open in 1936. Moses, along with the architects Aymar Embury II and Gilmore David Clarke, created a common design for these proposed aquatic centers. Each location was to have distinct pools for diving, swimming, and wading; bleachers and viewing areas; and bathhouses with locker rooms that could be used as gymnasiums. The pools were to have several common features, such as a minimum 55-yard (50 m) length, underwater lighting, heating, and filtration, all constructed using inexpensive materials. To fit the requirement for efficiency and low-cost construction, each building would be built using elements of the Streamline Moderne and Classical architectural styles. The buildings would also be near "comfort stations", additional playgrounds, and spruced-up landscapes.

Construction for some of the 11 pools began in October 1934. The previous month, a new playground had been completed at McCarren Park. By mid-1936, ten of the eleven WPA-funded pools were completed and were being opened at a rate of one per week. The McCarren Park Pool was the eighth pool to open, (Note: The pools opened in the following chronological order: Hamilton Fish Park, Thomas Jefferson Park, Astoria Park, Tompkinsville Pool, Highbridge Park, Sunset Park, Crotona Park, McCarren Park, Betsy Head Park, Colonial Park, and Red Hook Park.) with a ceremony held on July 31, 1936. This was the largest gathering out of the eleven pool openings held that year. The McCarren Play Center was mostly complete at the time of its opening, but all the finishing details had been applied by the 1937 season.

=== Decline and renovations ===
==== 20th century ====
By the 1970s, McCarren Park and other city parks were in poor condition due to the 1975 New York City fiscal crisis. NYC Parks commenced a project to restore the pools in several parks in 1977, including at McCarren Park. These projects were not carried out due to a lack of money, and by March 1981, NYC Parks had only 2,900 employees in its total staff, less than 10 percent of the 30,000 present when Moses was parks commissioner. In 1982, the NYC Parks budget increased greatly, enabling the agency to carry out $76 million worth of restoration projects by year's end; among these projects was the restoration of the McCarren Park Pool.

Unlike the other ten city pools that opened in 1936, McCarren Pool was not restored. Residents had opposed the renovation, preferring that it be closed instead, as they claimed the pool had become a hub for drug dealing and prostitution. The pool was closed after the end of the 1983 season, and when contractors tried to perform a renovation in 1984, protestors chained themselves to the complex's gates. The pool complex quickly became blighted and covered in graffiti. The bathhouse buildings were broken-into and vandalized, until they were sealed up sometime around 1989. The eagle sculptures were stolen from the bathhouse and recovered by an NYC Parks employee who saw them in the window of an architectural-salvage store in Lower Manhattan. A car was also driven into the dried-up pool.

By 1989, Brooklyn Community Board 1 had devised plans to restore the pool, but destroy the bathhouse buildings and build a gymnasium and community center. The pool would be reduced to a capacity of 2,000. The project would not begin before 1995 because the New York City Landmarks Preservation Commission (LPC) was determining whether to designate the eleven Moses-era pools as landmarks. At the time, the LPC was considering designation for the McCarren Play Center to avert the demolition of the bathhouse. Phyllis Yampolsky, a local resident whom NYC Parks had hired to ensure the structure's demolition, had reconsidered her position after seeing the structure. Yampolsky later said that neighborhood leaders saw her as "an enemy of the people" after her change of sentiment. A compromise to preserve the wings was reached by 1990, but the LPC did not designate the bathhouse at that time. Yampolsky helped found the McCarren Park Conservancy in 1994. The group sought to restore the pool and add several structures that would produce a profit for the pool.

==== 21st century ====
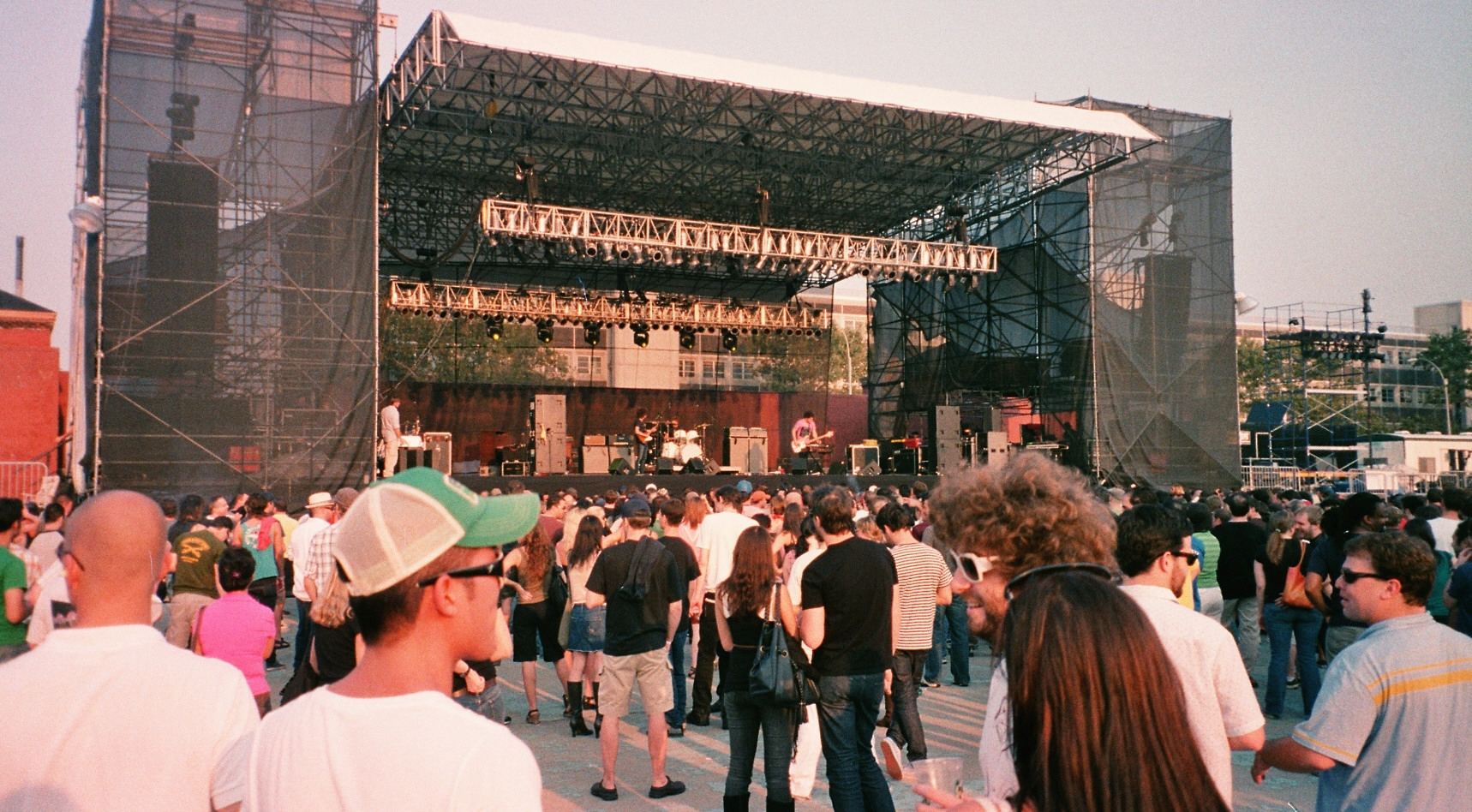
Wolfmother in concert at McCarren Pool in 2006

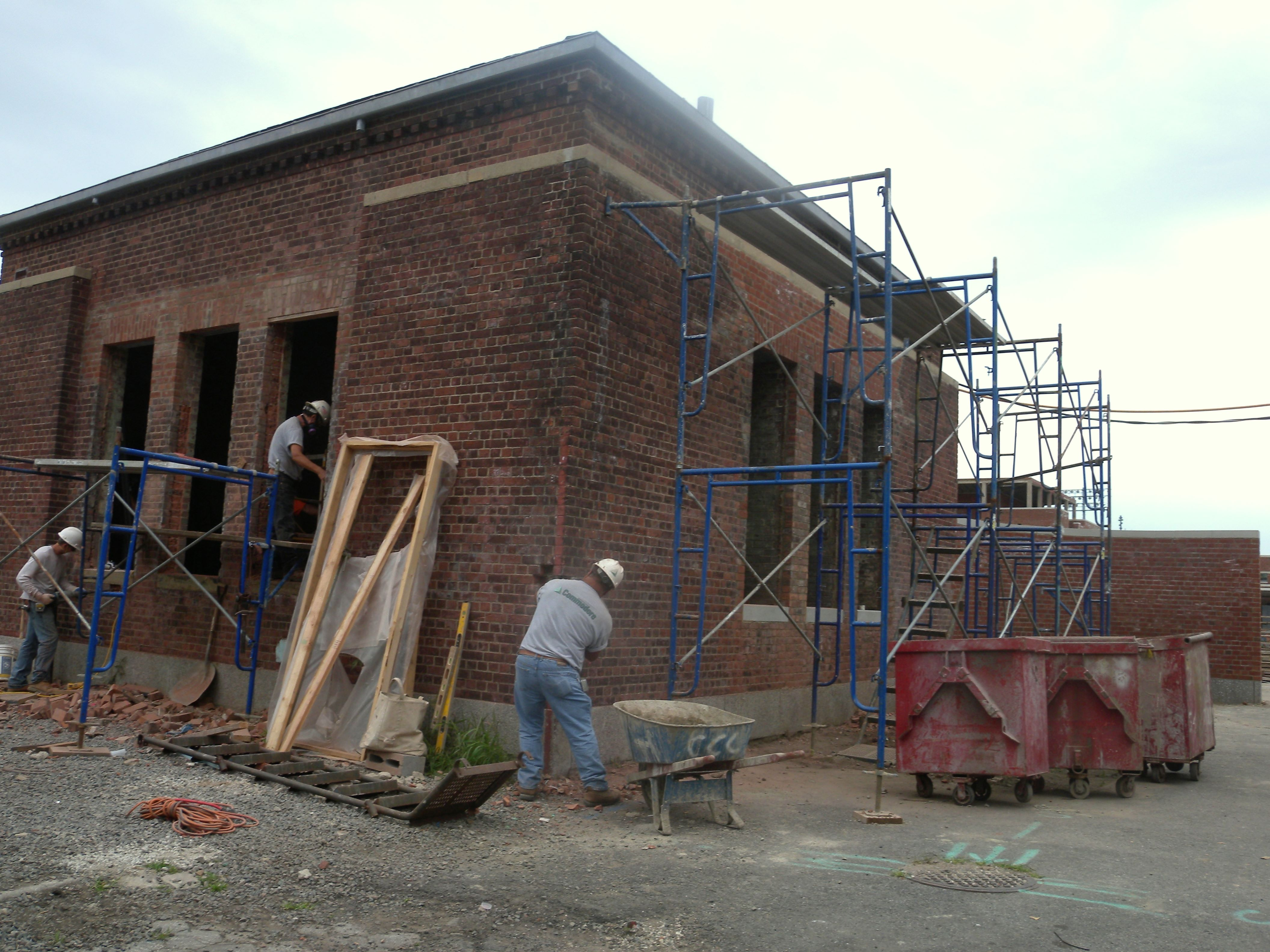
Renovation in progress

In 2000, Yampolsky presented a proposal for a restored pool and bathhouse, designed by architect Robert A. M. Stern. The next year, the ballfield received a $560,000 renovation. Additionally, in April 2001, Community Board 1 voted to reconstruct the facility to encompass a skate park, an indoor recreation/performance center, and a smaller pool that could be converted to a seasonal ice rink. The plan was estimated to cost $26 million and had a good chance of receiving public funding. However, the city government's budgetary deficits after the September 11 attacks shelved the plan for several years.

Meanwhile, as part of the 2005 rezoning of Greenpoint and Williamsburg, the City appropriated $1 million in capital budget funds for restoration of the pool. In 2004, choreographer Noémie Lafrance requested permission from the New York City Department of Parks and Recreation to use the derelict pool as a performance space. Lafrance chose the space as she resided nearby and wanted "this space for community use for other performances and for it to be used as an experimental space where people can develop site-specific ideas." Lafrance was able get to permission by raising funds, as well as receiving a donation of $200,000 from Live Nation. However, controversy arose as Lafrance and community activists objected to Live Nation's plans for paid concerts using the public space for private profit. The first public event in the pool, a dance performance called Agora, choreographed by Lafrance, was held by Sens Production that summer. In 2006, the track and soccer field were renovated for $1.7 million. The City Council also allocated $300,000 to support the construction of a seasonal rink. The handball and bocce facilities received a $601,000 renovation around the same time.

The LPC designated the McCarren Play Center as a landmark in 2007. During early 2007, many in the community expressed a preference that the pool be returned to its historic use as an active recreational facility, with a smaller space dedicated to cultural and concert events. In April 2007, New York City mayor Michael Bloomberg announced that a $50 million reconstruction of the pool would move forward, funded as part of the City's PlaNYC long-term planning initiative. The site continued to be used as a large concert venue until 2008 by Live Nation, Bowery Presents, and local promotor JellyNYC. The plan presented to the LPC in September 2008 called for a performance space to be included alongside a new pool, an ice-skating rink, a cafe, a community center, and an exhibition center. The LPC approved the renovation plan on September 9, 2008. Final design renderings were completed in February 2009, and renovation work began that December. The work included removing graffiti, repairing the bathhouse and pool surfaces, and restoring the bathhouse. The pool reopened on June 28, 2012, although local residents expressed concerns that the reopened pool would attract crime. The project was conducted by Rogers Marvel Architects and cost $50 million.

In 2013, work was begun to remove "Hipster Lake", a puddle of water that was annoying users of the park's fields. That year, a draft of a report commissioned for the Parks Department detailed the poor conditions of the bathhouse, including moisture accumulation. NYC Parks planned to restore the bathhouse starting in mid-2021. Following an influx of asylum seekers to New York City, in 2023, city officials converted portions of the recreation centers at McCarren Park and Sunset Park into temporary shelters.

== See also ==
- List of New York City Designated Landmarks in Brooklyn
