= Thomas Jefferson Park =

Public park in Manhattan, New York

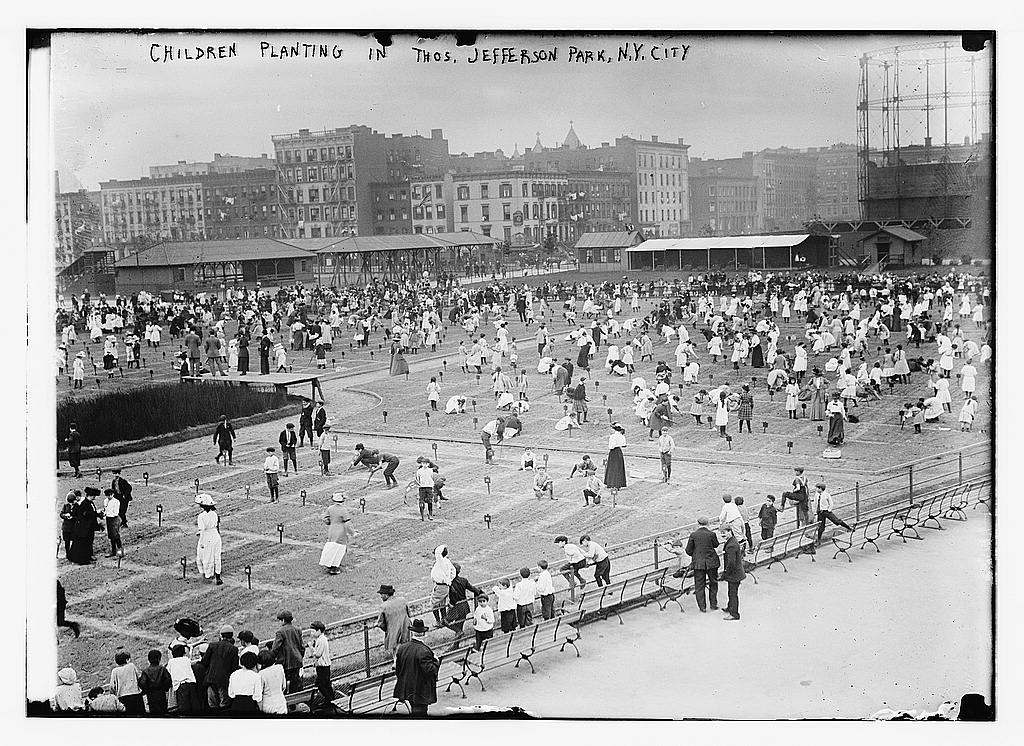
- Interactive map of Thomas Jefferson Park
- Type: Urban park
- Location: East Harlem, Manhattan, New York City
- Coordinates: 40°47′36″N 73°56′07″W
- Area: 15.52 acres (6.28 ha)
- Created: 1902
- Operator: NYC Parks
- Public transit: Subway: to 110th Street; Bus: M15, M15 SBS, M116

New York City Landmark
- Designated: July 24, 2007
- Reference no.: 2236
- Designated entity: Bathhouse facade and pool

Thomas Jefferson Park is a 15.52-acre (6.28 ha) public park in the East Harlem neighborhood of Manhattan in New York City. The park is on First Avenue between 111th and 114th Streets. It contains a playground as well as facilities for baseball, basketball, football, handball, running, skating, and soccer. The Thomas Jefferson Play Center within the park consists of a recreation center and a pool. The park and play center, named for former U.S. president Thomas Jefferson, are maintained by the New York City Department of Parks and Recreation (NYC Parks).

The land for the park was acquired starting in 1897. Though the park opened in 1902, the first recreational facilities did not open until 1905. The pool and bathhouse was designed by Stanley C. Brogren during a Works Progress Administration project in 1935–1936, while a playground next to the adjacent Benjamin Franklin High School opened in 1942. The pool was extensively refurbished in 1992, followed by the park in 1994. The Thomas Jefferson Play Center was designated a city landmark by the New York City Landmarks Preservation Commission in 2007.

== Description ==
Thomas Jefferson Park is in the East Harlem neighborhood of Manhattan in New York City. It is bounded by 111th Street to the south, First Avenue to the west, 114th Street to the north, and the FDR Drive to the east. Pleasant Avenue runs north of the park, with Manhattan Center for Science and Mathematics, a high school, bordering on the park.

Thomas Jefferson Park covers 15.52 acres (6.28 ha). Two paths cross the park from west to east at approximately 112th and 113th Streets, dividing the park roughly into thirds. These pathways contain benches, trees, and cast-iron lamps.

The southern pathway contains a steel sculpture, Tomorrow's Wind, by sculptor Melvin Edwards. The 13.5-foot-tall (4.1 m) sculpture, installed in 1995 as a site-specific artwork, consists of an oval disk adjacent to a shape resembling a crescent. The northern pathway contains a steel-and-bronze sculpture, El Arbol de Esperanza (Tree of Hope), by L. Brower Hatcher. The 18-foot-tall (5.5 m) work, dedicated in 1995, consists of a tree trunk topped by a globe with bronze figures created by local children. Despite being named for former U.S. president Thomas Jefferson, the park does not have a Jefferson sculpture.

=== Recreational facilities ===
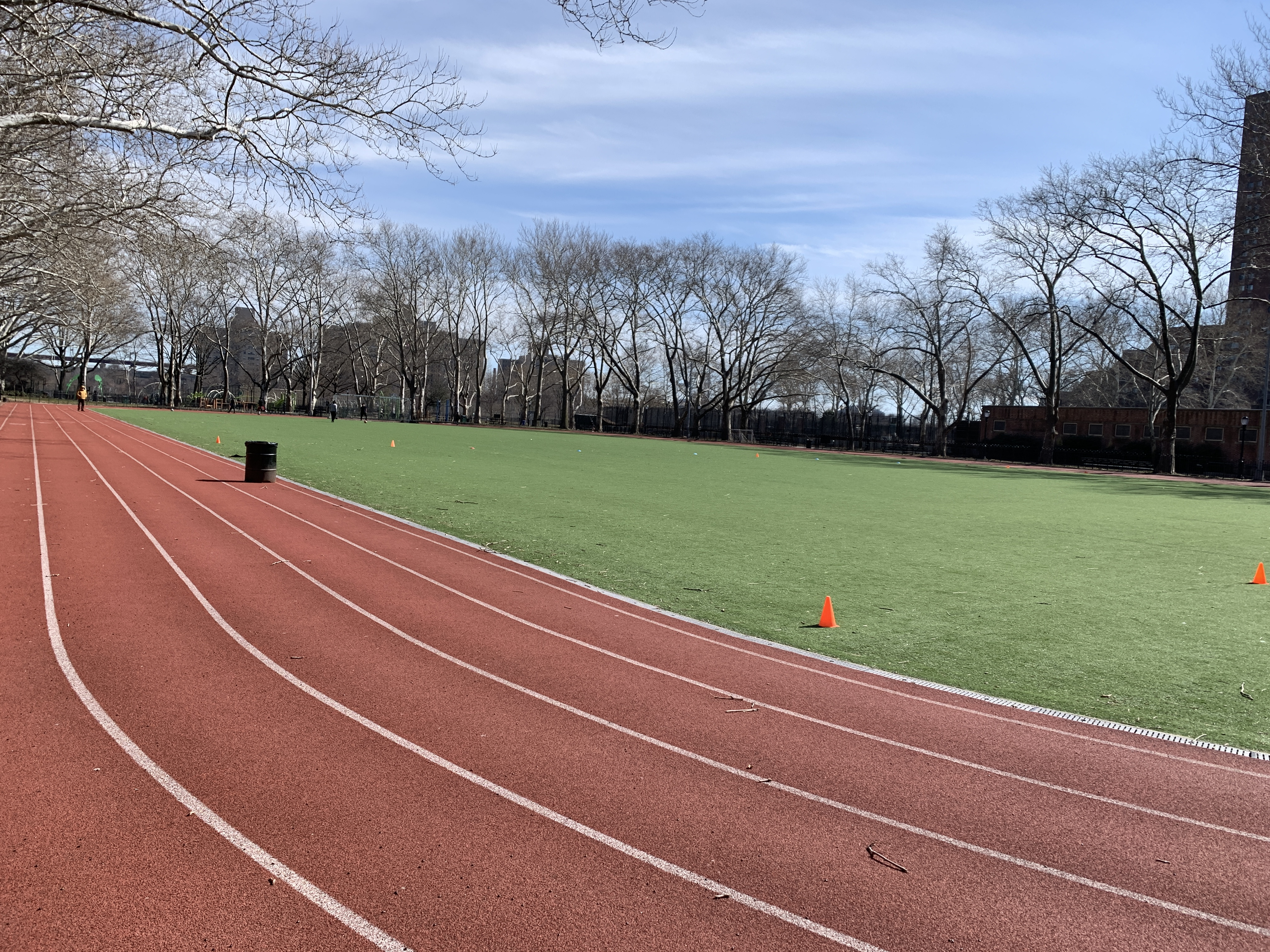
The running track and the soccer field at Thomas Jefferson Park

Thomas Jefferson Park contains two playgrounds. One is on First Avenue and 111th Street. at the southwestern corner, while the other is at Pleasant Avenue and 114th Street, at the northeastern corner. There are also three baseball fields: two in the southern third of the park, and the third at the eastern boundary of the park's center third. In addition, there are four basketball courts, two each at the northeastern and southeastern corners. The northeastern corner also contains two volleyball and eight handball courts, while the northwestern corner contains a soccer field. A dog run is at the southeast corner of the park.

The Thomas Jefferson Pool is in the center third of the park and is oriented west–east, with two pools (formerly three). The main pool measures 100 feet (30 m) wide and 246 feet (75 m) long, (Note: Dimensions of the main pool are alternatively given as 97 by 239 feet (30 by 73 m).) with a depth of 4 feet (1.2 m). The wading pool measures 100 feet (30 m) wide and 51 feet (16 m) long. The pool area contains fountains at its western and eastern ends. The main pool contains two water circulation fountains at its center. The diving pool had seven diving boards, of which one was a high board, but when it was converted to a wading pool in 1992, the diving boards were removed. The main and diving pools collectively held 1,080,000 U.S. gallons (4,100,000 L; 900,000 imp gal). An NYC Parks press release from 1936 indicates that, when the pool was completed, there was another wading pool measuring 100 by 60 feet (30 by 18 m). According to contemporary sources, the pools had a capacity of 1,450 swimmers when built, though the New York City Landmarks Preservation Commission cites a figure of 2,600 swimmers. The pools are separated by a 10-foot-wide (3.0 m) deck with a wrought-iron fence. North and south of the pool area, there is terrace seating slightly raised above the main deck.

=== Recreation center ===
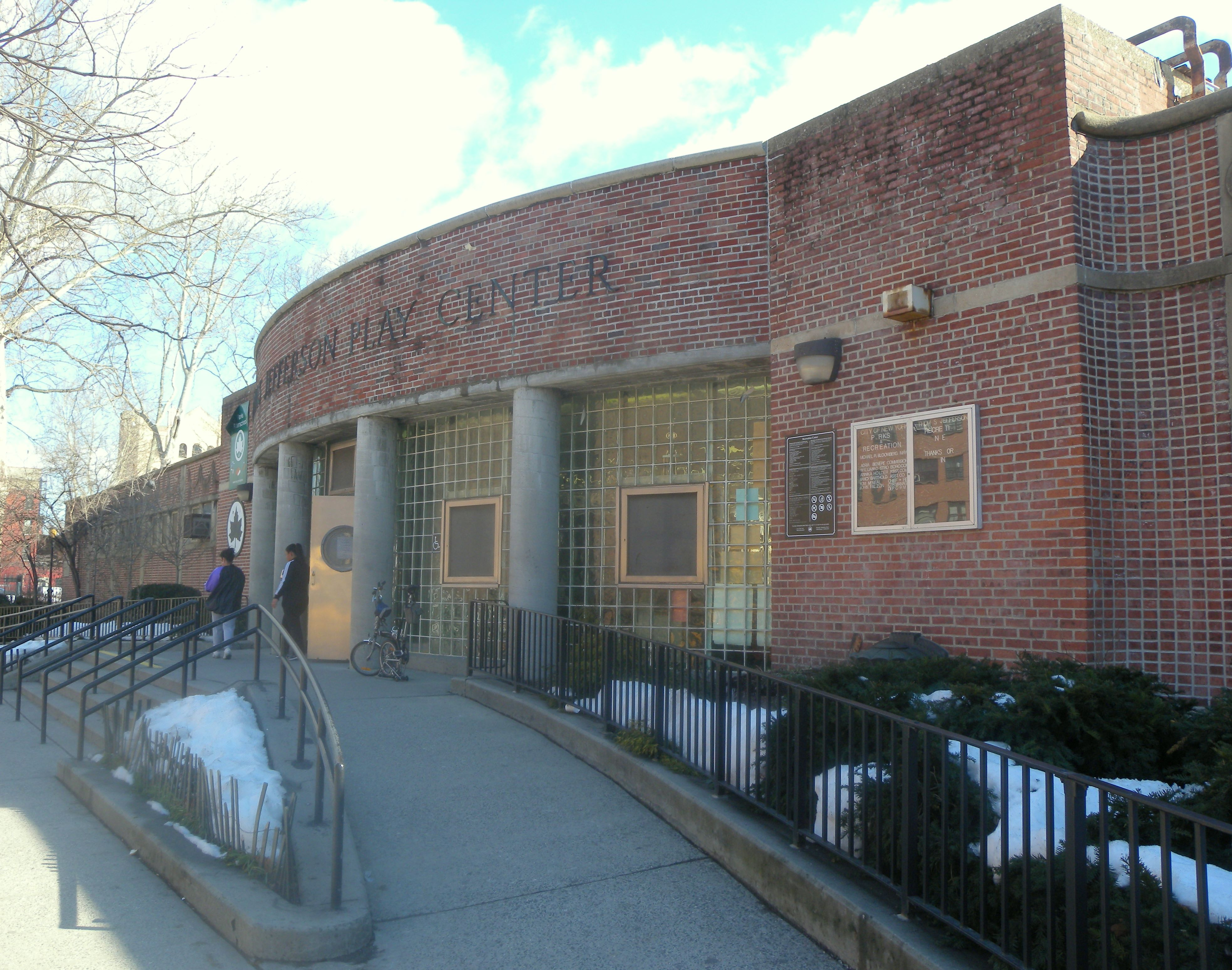
Thomas Jefferson Play Center

The recreation center, originally the bathhouse, is a U-shaped brick structure, with a main entrance facing west on First Avenue between 112th and 113th Streets. The main entrance is through a central pavilion that is curved slightly outward. The entrance pavilion consists of a small stoop with ramps on either side. The entrance is 45 feet (14 m) wide and contains four concrete columns supporting the top of the pavilion, where bronze letters with the words thomas jefferson play center are mounted. The central pavilion is enclosed by a glass block wall behind the columns. but was originally open to the outdoors, with only a freestanding ticket booth. Similar glass block walls and columns face east toward the pool. The pavilion is topped by a concrete parapet and string courses.

The main entrance is flanked by two L-shaped wings, which extend east around the pool area. The northern wing was designed with locker and restroom facilities for women, while the southern wing was designed with facilities for men. The recreation center also contains a fitness room, afterschool room, media lab, and multipurpose room. The outer facades of both wings are grouped into vertical bays. Each bay contains square hopper windows, which only illuminate the top portions of the facade, as well as raised brick swags above the windows. Each bay is separated by stone pilasters topped by stone medallions. The corners of each wing are hexagonal. The pool area has a similar design to the outer facades.

Architectural critic Lewis Mumford called the recreation center's design an instance of "sound vernacular modern architecture", but criticized its classical features, which were meant to be a tribute to the park's namesake. The recreation center was also praised for using "simple materials simply disposed".

== History ==
=== Early history ===
The New York City Board of Aldermen first devised plans in 1894 for Thomas Jefferson Park, to be built in Italian Harlem. The city acquired the land for the park starting in 1897. Samuel Parsons was involved with the initial design. An early plan for the park called for an artificial lake and marble cottage to be built in the park. The recreational facilities also included a 200-by-60-foot (61 by 18 m) pier on the nearby Harlem River, which opened in 1899. The development of the park was intended to help Italian Harlem, which the Brooklyn Daily Eagle described as "for many years the black spot of Harlem"; the existing buildings on the park's site were demolished in mid-1899. By the end of that year, the last buildings on the site were being demolished. The last lots, acquired from the Consolidated Gas Company, had been delayed due to disputes over compensation.

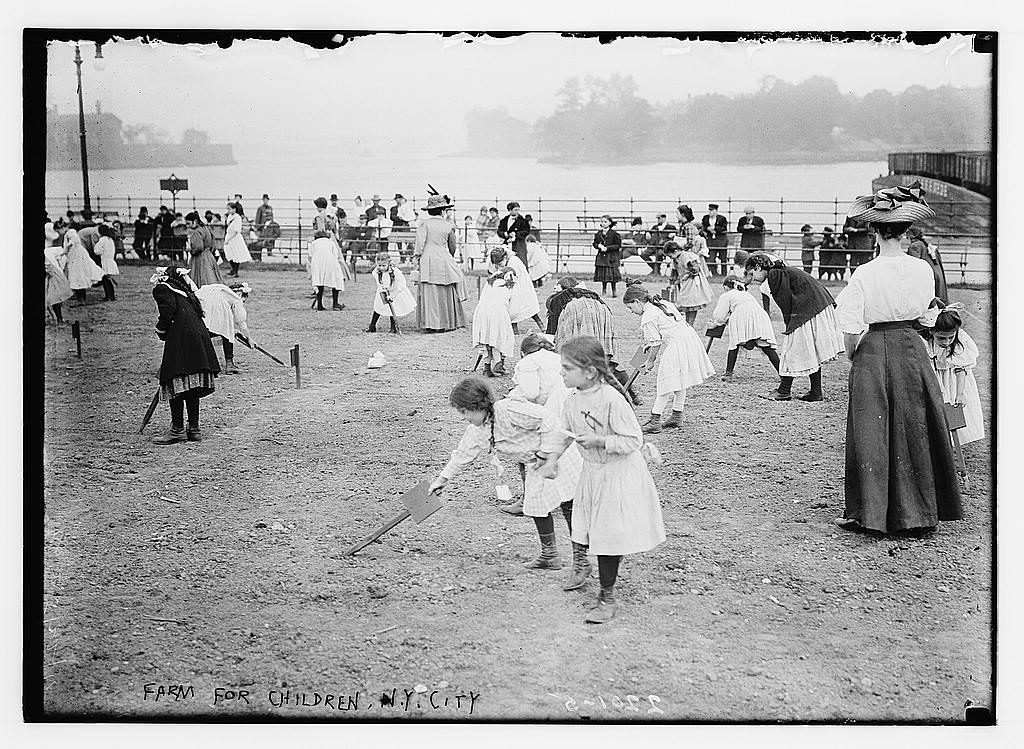
Children learning farming

The park opened on July 12, 1902; at the time, the site was undeveloped, and only nine acres (3.6 ha) of the fifteen-acre (6.1 ha) site was accessible to the public. A $150,000 contract to construct the park was awarded early the next year. Among the improvements being planned for the park was a classical pavilion. During construction, Thomas Jefferson Park hosted a ceremony in July 1904 where Archbishop John Murphy Farley, with permission from Pope Pius X, approved the Canonical coronation of an image of the Blessed Virgin Mary for the nearby Our Lady of Mount Carmel Church. Work on the improvements was completed by February 1905.

The recreation facilities in Thomas Jefferson Park opened on October 7, 1905, with a ceremony attended by several thousand people. The park had cost $3 million to build, or about $4.46 per square foot ($48.0/m^{2}). The high cost mostly came from the $2.7 million cost of land acquisition and was attributed to the existing density of East Harlem. There were initially separate facilities for boys and girls; each had a gymnasium, running track, playground, and shower area. The New York Sun called Thomas Jefferson Park "the first playground in the world that has a running track for girls". There was also a classical-style pavilion. A "farm garden", with over a thousand plots for children, was added in May 1911. The farm gardens, taking up 2 acres (0.81 ha), were used to teach children horticultural skills. A grove of trees, dedicated to veterans killed in World War I, was placed at First Avenue and 113th Street in 1923. By the 1930s, neighborhood children preferred to play in the street rather than at the park.

=== Works Progress Administration renovations ===
In 1934, mayor Fiorello H. La Guardia nominated Robert Moses to become commissioner of a unified New York City Department of Parks and Recreation. At the time, the United States was experiencing the Great Depression; immediately after La Guardia won the 1933 election, Moses began to write "a plan for putting 80,000 men to work on 1,700 relief projects". By the time he was in office, several hundred such projects were underway across the city.

Moses was especially interested in creating new pools and other bathing facilities, such as those in Jacob Riis Park, Jones Beach, and Orchard Beach. He devised a list of 23 pools around the city, including one at Thomas Jefferson Park. The pools would be built using funds from the Works Progress Administration (WPA), a federal agency created as part of the New Deal to combat the Depression's negative effects. Eleven of these pools were to be designed concurrently and open in 1936. Moses, along with the architects Aymar Embury II and Gilmore David Clarke, created a common design for these proposed aquatic centers. Each location was to have distinct pools for diving, swimming, and wading; bleachers and viewing areas; and bathhouses with locker rooms that could be used as gymnasiums. The pools were to have several common features, such as a minimum 55-yard (50 m) length, underwater lighting, heating, and filtration, all constructed using inexpensive materials. To fit the requirement for efficiency and low-cost construction, each building would be built using elements of the Streamline Moderne and Classical architectural styles. The buildings would also be near "comfort stations", additional playgrounds, and spruced-up landscapes.

Construction for some of the 11 pools began in October 1934. Embury filed plans for a bathhouse and swimming pool at Thomas Jefferson Park in August 1935, but the actual design of the pool and bathhouse has been attributed to Stanley C. Brogren. (Note: Alternatively spelled Brogen) The next month, La Guardia presided over the opening of the northern playground, which contained athletic fields, a wading pool, and children's play equipment. The southern playground opened that November, with shuffleboard, bocce, and horseshoe courts. Many of the original park features were replaced with New Deal-era designs, and upon La Guardia's request, bocce courts were added to the design. By mid-1936, ten of the eleven WPA-funded pools were completed and were being opened at a rate of one per week. The pool was the second pool to open, (Note: The pools opened in the following chronological order: Hamilton Fish Park, Thomas Jefferson Park, Astoria Park, Tompkinsville Pool, Highbridge Park, Sunset Park, Crotona Park, McCarren Park, Betsy Head Park, Colonial Park, and Red Hook Park.) with a ceremony taking place on June 27, 1936. A playground in the northeast section of the park, near the Manhattan Center for Science and Mathematics (at the time known as the Benjamin Franklin High School), was completed in 1942.

While there were many black and Hispanic residents near Thomas Jefferson Park, its pool was used mostly by white residents of Italian Harlem, while black and Hispanic residents mostly used Harlem's other pool at Colonial Park. According to Moses biographer Robert Caro, close associates of Moses had claimed they could keep African Americans from using the Thomas Jefferson Pool by making the water too cold. However, no other source backs the claim that the Thomas Jefferson Pool had different heating equipment from any other pool. As with all of the city's other WPA pools, diesel motors were used to pump water into the pool, and excess heat from these motors was used to keep the water warm. Caro also wrote that predominantly white lifeguards were hired at Thomas Jefferson Park, although it is unclear whether Moses did this on purpose. In any case, black and Hispanic residents often faced violence if they tried to swim at Thomas Jefferson Pool or visit the park in general. In subsequent years, the Italian population of the area decreased, while the black and Hispanic population increased.

=== Decline and restoration ===
During the late 20th century, the park grew decrepit. The bathhouse, used during the winter as a gathering place for elderly men, was rundown by 1966, with faulty heaters and rotting roof beams. Part of the bathhouse was destroyed in an electrical fire in 1973, and the original classical style pavilion was destroyed in the 1970s due to vandalism. The park had been the site of several killings, including a gang beating in 1958 and a shooting in 1974. By the 1970s, Thomas Jefferson Park and other city parks were in poor condition following the 1975 New York City fiscal crisis. NYC Parks commenced a project to restore the pools in several parks in 1977, including at Thomas Jefferson Park, for whose restoration the agency set aside an estimated $2.9 million. These projects were not carried out due to a lack of money. By March 1981, NYC Parks had only 2,900 employees in its total staff, less than 10 percent of the 30,000 present when Moses was parks commissioner. Starting in the early 1970s, a group of "junior lifeguards" was hired to keep the pools and bathhouse clean. During this era, Thomas Jefferson Pool employed the first female lifeguard at any NYC Parks facility. According to landscape designer Lynden B. Miller, the park received a large number of plantings in the mid-1980s, but they died off due to a lack of maintenance.

NYC Parks continued to face financial shortfalls in the coming years, and the pools retained a reputation for high crime. For the summer of 1991, mayor David Dinkins had planned to close all 32 outdoor pools in the city, a decision that was only reversed after a $2 million donation from a trust created upon the death of real estate developer Sol Goldman and $1.8 million from other sources. Additionally, in the 1990s, a practice called "whirlpooling" became common in New York City pools such as Thomas Jefferson Park, in which women would be inappropriately fondled by teenage boys. By the turn of the century, crimes such as sexual assaults had decreased in parks citywide due to increased security.

Thomas Jefferson Park received an extensive renovation in the early 1990s, funded by a $10.5 million capital expenditure. Richard Dattner was hired to renovate the pool and bathhouse. As part of the project, the diving pool was converted into a wading pool. The pool project was completed in January 1992 for $8.5 million. The renovation of the park grounds was estimated to cost $2.6 million, but the winning contractor submitted a bid that was $1 million lower. The grounds renovation was completed in 1994 and the two artworks were installed the following year, In 1999, a reporter for The New York Times wrote that the pool had a "distinctly Latin flavor", with many of its visitors being Puerto Rican or Mexican. A synthetic turf soccer field was installed in the park in 2003.

In 2007, the New York City Landmarks Preservation Commission designated the Thomas Jefferson Pool and Play Center as a landmark. The commission had previously considered the pool for landmark status in 1990, along with the other ten WPA pools in the city. The soccer field was temporarily closed in 2008 and 2009 following the discovery of high lead concentrations. Thomas Jefferson Park's skatepark opened in 2017 on the site of a former empty field. Thomas Jefferson Playground was reconstructed starting in 2019 and reopened in March 2021. In July 2025, a public restroom was installed in the park for $1 million.

== See also ==
- List of New York City Designated Landmarks in Manhattan above 110th Street
