= Church of Our Lady of Mount Carmel (Manhattan) =

Roman Catholic church in New York City

Coordinates: 40°47′41.38″N 73°56′2.53″W

Our Lady of Mount Carmel of New York The Madonna of East Harlem
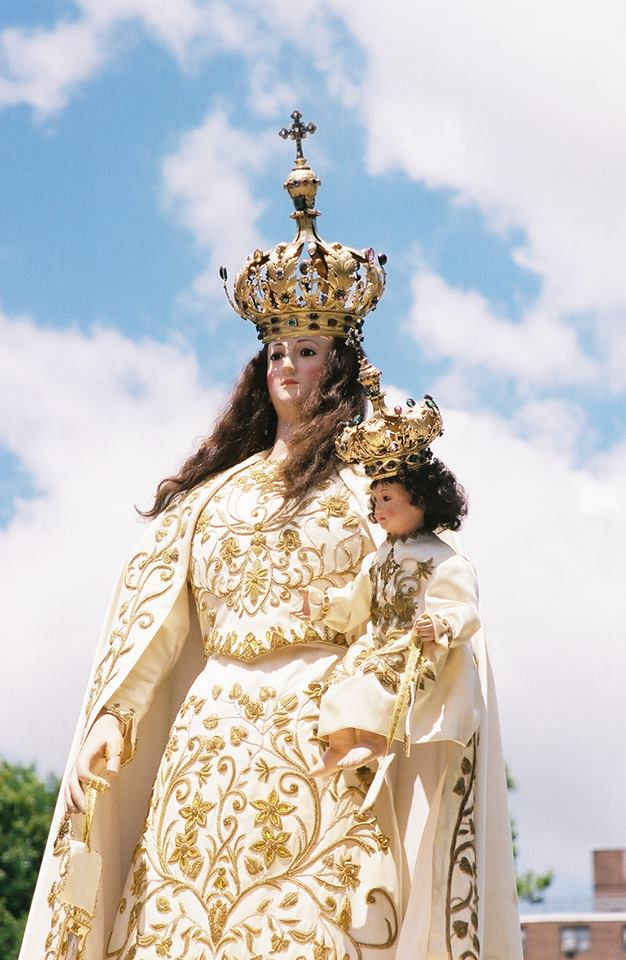
- The canonically crowned image out in public procession
- Location: East Harlem, New York City, New York, United States
- Date: 1884
- Witness: Antonio Petrucci
- Approval: Pope Leo XIII; Pope Pius X
- Shrine: Our Lady of Mount Carmel Parish

Church of Our Lady of Mount Carmel
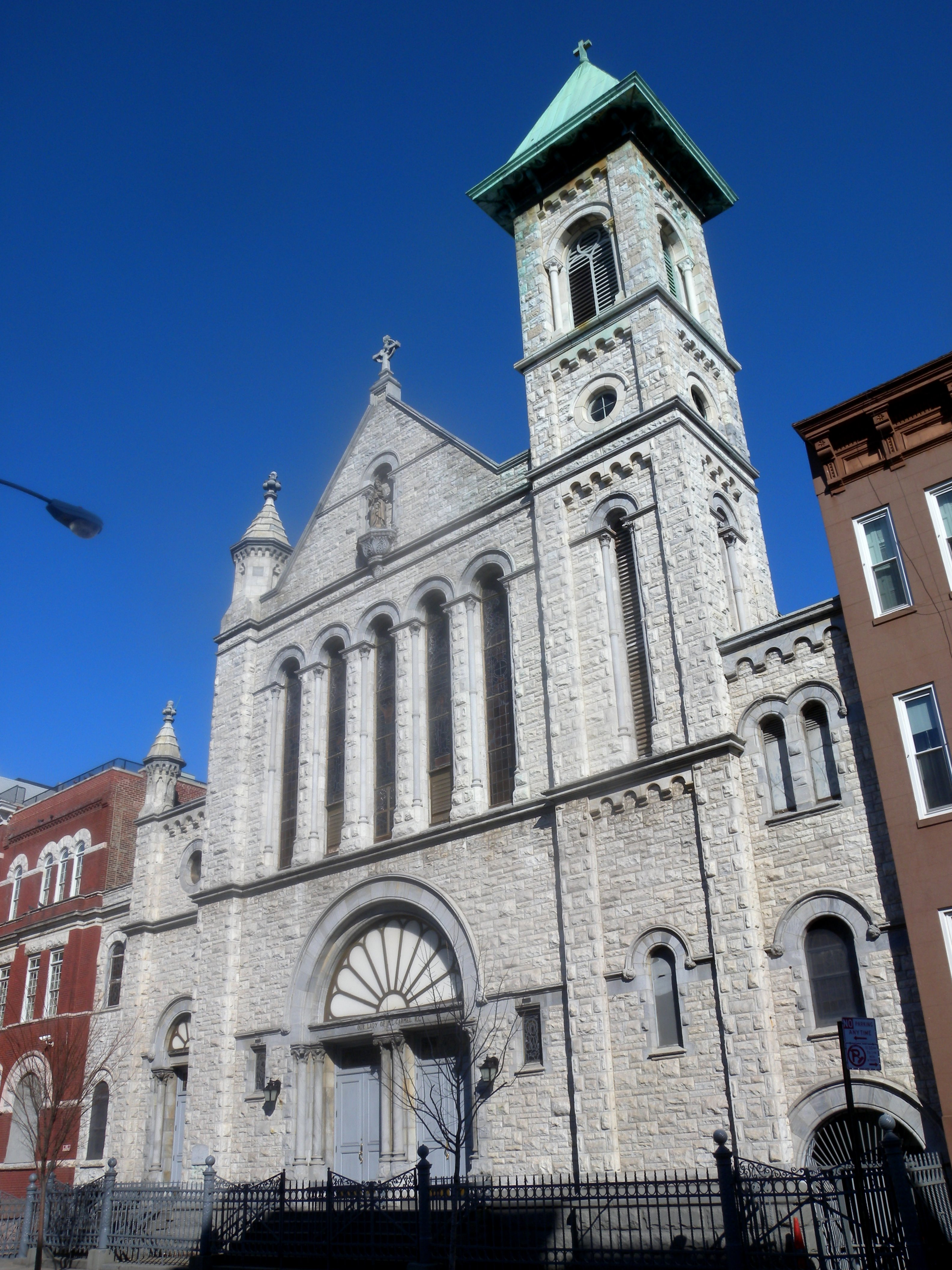
- The facade of the church
- Interactive map of the Church of Our Lady of Mount Carmel area

General information
- Location: New York, New York, United States
- Construction started: 1884
- Client: Roman Catholic Archdiocese of New York

Website
- https://www.olmtc.org/

The Church of Our Lady of Mount Carmel is a Catholic parish under the authority of the Archdiocese of New York, located in East Harlem, Manhattan, New York City. The parish enshrines a vested statue of the Blessed Virgin Mary under the title of Our Lady of Mount Carmel, widely venerated by its devotees.

Pope Leo XIII granted the image a canonical coronation on 12 May 1903. Pope Pius X donated a gemstone for the crown, and the rite of coronation was executed on 10 July 1904.

== History ==
The church itself was constructed in 1884 by Fr Emil Kirner of the Order of the Pallottines. At the time, the parishioners held mass at East 111th street until the completion of the shrine in 1885. The church at the time cost US$40,000 though did not formally open until 7 August 1887.

The church's formal address is 448 East 116th Street, although the entrance to the church building is on East 115th Street, just off Pleasant Avenue.

The former shrine became populated with incoming Italian and Bohemian congregants and Our Lady of Mount Carmel was the second Italian parish in New York City and the first Southern Italian parish.

Since the first feast of Our Lady of Mt. Carmel on 16 July 1881, its annual feast has been a major event in East Harlem, at one time attended by more than 100,000. The church cornerstone was laid on 20 September 1884. A new school and gymnasium were added to the church on 1 September 1965.

The parish shrine of the Virgin Mary was crowned by in the name of the Pope on 10 July 1904.

== Marian devotion ==
The parish church enshrines an image of the Blessed Virgin Mary venerated under the title of Our Lady of Mount Carmel, brought by an Italian immigrant and saloon owner, Antonio Petrucci from Polla, in Salerno, Italy. The statue replaced a poster image used by Italian immigrants devotees who first settled in the area.

The image, garnering devotion gained petition from Father Scipione Tofini (1836—1921) of the Pallotine Order and was authorised to crown by Pope Leo XIII by a pontifical decree dated 12 May 1903. Pope Pius X approved the Canonical coronation under his pontificate by granting an Emerald gemstone on 10 July 1904 via Archbishop John Murphy Farley, which was held in Thomas Jefferson Park to accommodate the large number of pilgrims. The image is widely venerated by its faithful, who sometimes refer to the image as the Madonna of East Harlem.

== Today ==
Every year on the second weekend of August, the Giglio Society of East Harlem holds an Italian festival on the streets around the Our Lady of Mt Carmel Church. The festival or "feast" includes the Society performing the "Dancing Giglio". The dancing of the Giglio is an Italian tradition which began over 125 years ago on the streets of Italian Harlem.

In 2013, the parish was placed under the care of Polish Pallottine fathers. The church currently offers masses in English, Spanish, Polish, Haitian Creole, and Latin. Since 2015 the pastor of the parish is Fr Marian Wierzchowski.

== Bibliography ==
- The Madonna of 115th Street: Faith and Community in Italian Harlem, 1880-1950, Third Edition. 2010.
