= Pleasant Avenue =

Avenue in Manhattan, New York

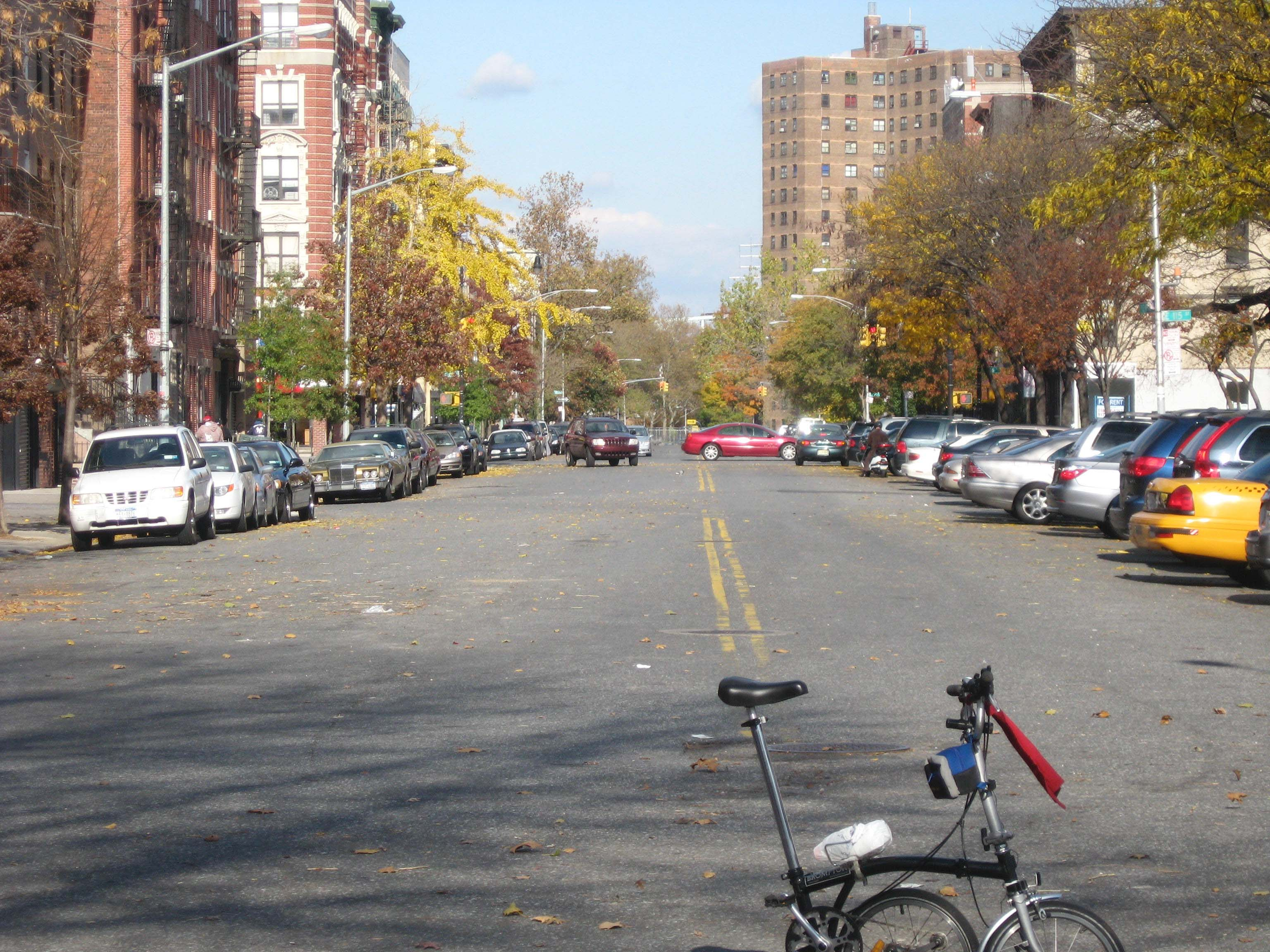
- Looking north from East 114th Street
- Owner: City of New York
- Maintained by: NYCDOT
- Length: 0.3 mi (0.48 km)
- Location: Manhattan, New York City
- South end: 114th Street
- North end: 120th Street
- East: FDR Drive
- West: First Avenue

Construction
- Commissioned: March 1811

Pleasant Avenue is a north-south street in the East Harlem neighborhood of Manhattan. It begins at East 114th Street and ends at East 120th Street. The street was the northernmost section of Avenue A, which stretched from Alphabet City northward, and was added to the grid wherever space allowed between First Avenue and the East River. This stretch was renamed "Pleasant Avenue" in 1879. Unlike York Avenue, however, the addresses on Pleasant Avenue are not continuous with that on Avenue A (which would be in the 2000-series if they were continuous).

In 1905, the section of Pleasant Avenue south of 114th Street was demapped in favor of Thomas Jefferson Park. Prior to this, it ran south to E. 108th Street.

Pleasant Avenue is one of the last remaining streets in Italian Harlem, which flourished in the eastern part of Harlem from the late 1890s to the 1980s. The neighborhood shrank over the years, especially since the 1990s, and the smaller remaining Italian population mostly resides on Pleasant Avenue. The street is the site of one of the few remaining Italian restaurants in the area, Rao's, at 114th Street. The street had largely lost its Italian character by 2010. Both in real life and in film, Pleasant Avenue has long been associated with the Mafia. The street was the headquarters of Anthony Salerno, head of the Genovese crime family, prior to his incarceration for racketeering in 1986. It was also the founding location and turf of the Italian-American drug trafficking and murder-for-hire gang known as East Harlem Purple Gang during the 1970s and early 1980s.

The Manhattan Center for Science and Mathematics, formerly Benjamin Franklin High School, is located on Pleasant Avenue. In July 2010, Pleasant Avenue became the site of a Target store, at the East River Plaza at 517 East 117th Street. Every year on the second Sunday of August the Giglio Society of East Harlem performs the dancing Giglio on Pleasant Avenue. The dancing of the Giglio is an Italian tradition which began over 100 years ago.
