= Giglio Society of East Harlem =

Italian-American society that sponsors an annual festival

Giglio Di Sant'Antonio of East Harlem
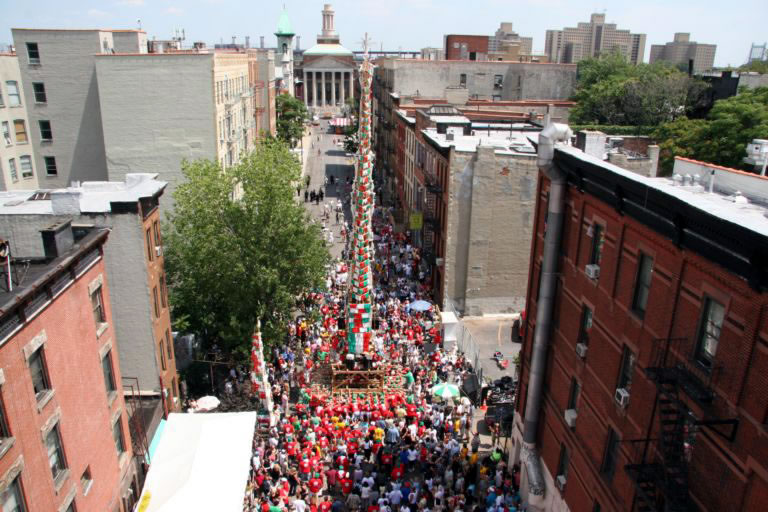
- Giglio tower being carried by members of the Giglio Society of East Harlem on 10 August 2010
- Genre: Procession
- Date: second weekend of August
- Frequency: Annual
- Locations: Pleasant Avenue, East Harlem, Manhattan, New York City
- Inaugurated: 1908; 118 years ago
- Most recent: 2025
- Website: Official website

The Giglio Society of East Harlem is a non-profit Italian-American society located in East Harlem, Manhattan, New York City, that sponsors an annual feast honoring their patron saint, Saint Anthony.

== History ==
=== 20th century ===
Southern Italian immigrants predominated East Harlem, or Italian Harlem, especially in the area east of Lexington Avenue between 96th and 116th Streets and east of Madison Avenue between 116th and 125th Streets, with each street featuring people from different regions of Italy. The neighborhood became known as "Italian Harlem". The Italian American hub of Manhattan was the first part of Manhattan to be referred to as Little Italy.

Many families from the town of Brusciano, Naples, Italy, migrated to East Harlem, bringing with their tradition of the yearly Dance of the Giglio festival in honor of Anthony of Padua. The Giglio (lily in English) is an 80-foot-tall, three-ton statue that is carried and danced through the streets of East Harlem by more than 100 members of the society.

The first Giglio Feast on 106th street in East Harlem started approximately in 1908. Gioacchino Vivolo is credited for being the first Capo Paranza on 106th Street. The Festival on 106th Street grew for many years, becoming one of the largest street fairs in America and remained that way until 1955. Then, in 1957, the festival moved a few blocks uptown to 108th Street, where the Dance of the Giglio continued until 1971.

=== 21st century ===
After a 29-year hiatus, the Dance of the Giglio returned to East Harlem in 2000 as a cooperative Feast with the Church of Our Lady of Mt. Carmel. The feast is now located on Pleasant Avenue between 114th street and 116th street. In 2006, it was decided to hold the Dance of the Giglio Festival separate from the annual Our Lady of Mt Carmel feast. The decision to move the Dancing of the Giglio dates was made in order to relieve the strain on the Giglio community.

The East Harlem Giglio feast is held annually on the second weekend of August on Pleasant Avenue, drawing thousands of visitors, former residents and tourists from around the world. The three-ton Giglio statue is danced on the shoulders of over 100 faithful on the second Sunday of August.

== See also ==
- Feast of San Gennaro
- Italian Harlem
- List of Italian American neighborhoods
- Little Italy
