= Gilmore David Clarke =

American architect (1892–1982)

- Born: July 12, 1892; New York City, U.S.
- Died: August 6, 1982 (aged 90); Denmark
- Burial place: Arlington National Cemetery
- Education: Cornell University (BS)
- Spouses: Emma Elizabeth Vought (m. 1917); Mary Elizabeth Sprout (m. 1941; died 1962); Dolores Nancy Bedford (m. 1968)
- Military career
- Branch: United States Army
- Service years: 1917–1919
- Rank: Captain
- Conflicts: World War I
- Awards: Silver Star; Purple Heart

Gilmore David Clarke (July 12, 1892 – August 6, 1982) was an American civil engineer and landscape architect who designed many parks and public spaces in and around New York City.

== Biography ==
Gilmore David Clarke was born in New York City on July 12, 1892. He went to Cornell University to study landscape architecture and civil engineering, graduating in 1913 with a B.S. degree. From 1917 to 1919, Clarke served as an engineer in the U.S. Army during World War I, where he attained the rank of captain and was awarded the Silver Star and Purple Heart.

After his military service, he served on several architectural commissions, ranging from local to federal level. Amongst others, he was a member of the Architectural Advisory Board for the U.S. Capitol and of the New York State Council of Parks. He was awarded a Gold Medal of Honor by the Architectural League of New York in 1931 for his works in Westchester County. A design for Playland Amusement Park in Rye was among his commissions.

In 1934 he became a consultant for the New York City Parks Department under parks commissioner Robert Moses. His works in the city include the Central Park Zoo, the Conservatory Garden, the expansion of Riverside Park, and many other public spaces. The following year, he teamed up with Michael Rapuano (1904 – 1975), founding the firm of Clarke & Rapuano. From 1935 to his retirement in 1950 he taught landscape architecture at Cornell University, where he was the Dean of Architecture from 1939 on.

Clarke designed the landscape architecture of the 1939 New York World's Fair, and he and his firm of Clarke & Rapuano were also deeply involved in the design of the 1964 New York World's Fair, which were both held at Flushing Meadows-Corona Park. For the 1964 exhibition, Clarke designed the Unisphere, and his company designed many of the fountains and statues in the park, as well as the "Garden of Meditation" exhibit.

Clarke was also appointed the landscape architect and engineer for the Garden State Parkway. He had closely worked with Robert Moses and combined the examples of the Pennsylvania Turnpike and the Merritt Parkway to give the highway an efficient and beautiful appearance.

In addition to his practice in New York, Clarke was appointed in 1932 to the U.S. Commission of Fine Arts in Washington, D.C., and served as its chairman from 1937 to 1950. He led the Commission in opposition to several controversial issues during this period, including the design of the neo-classical Jefferson Memorial by John Russell Pope, the siting of the new Pentagon complex near Arlington Cemetery, and the construction of the so-called "Truman Balcony" within the south portico of the White House. He was awarded the Frank P. Brown Medal in 1945 and was a member and Special Committee chairman for the American Academy in Rome from 1944 to 1945. In 1944, Clarke was elected into the National Academy of Design as an Associate Academician, and became a full Academician in 1946.

Clarke retired from his firm in 1972 and later consulted on the construction of the United Nations Headquarters. He also became a trustee of the American Museum of Natural History.

Clarke died on August 6, 1982, while aboard the ship Royal Viking Star on a cruise off the coast of Denmark. He was buried at Arlington Cemetery.
