= Hamilton Fish Park =

Public park in Manhattan, New York

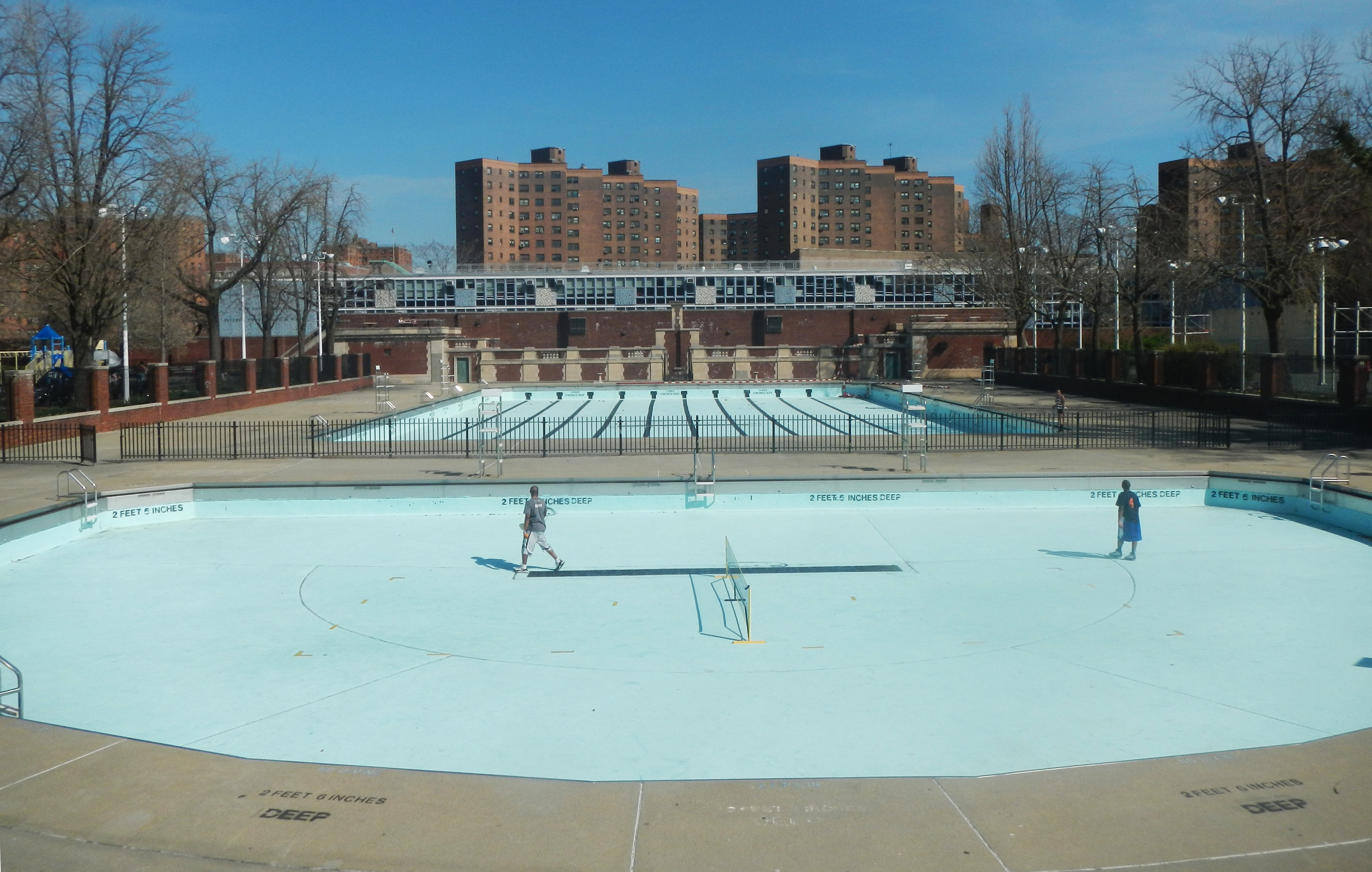
- The Hamilton Fish Pool, constructed in 1936
- Interactive map of Hamilton Fish Park
- Type: Urban park
- Location: Lower East Side, Manhattan, New York City
- Coordinates: 40°43′11″N 73°58′51″W
- Area: 4.30 acres (1.74 ha)
- Created: 1900
- Operator: NYC Parks
- Public transit: Bus: M9, M14D SBS, M21

New York City Landmark
- Designated: December 21, 1982
- Reference no.: 1264
- Designated entity: Bathhouse facade

Hamilton Fish Park is a public park on the Lower East Side of Manhattan in New York City. Named after former New York governor Hamilton Fish, the park was built on two blocks bounded by Houston, Pitt, Sheriff, and Stanton Streets. It contains a playground, basketball courts, and an outdoor swimming complex with general swimming and wading pools. Hamilton Fish Park also includes a Beaux-Arts recreation center designed by Carrère and Hastings. It is maintained by the New York City Department of Parks and Recreation (NYC Parks).

The park was planned during the late 19th century to alleviate overcrowded living conditions on the Lower East Side. The park and recreation building opened in 1900 as a landscaped park designed by Carrère and Hastings. The original design was reconfigured to accommodate more active recreation uses. The pool was built during a Works Progress Administration project in 1935–1936. The recreation center was made a New York City designated landmark in 1982, and the park was restored in the 1990s.

== Description ==
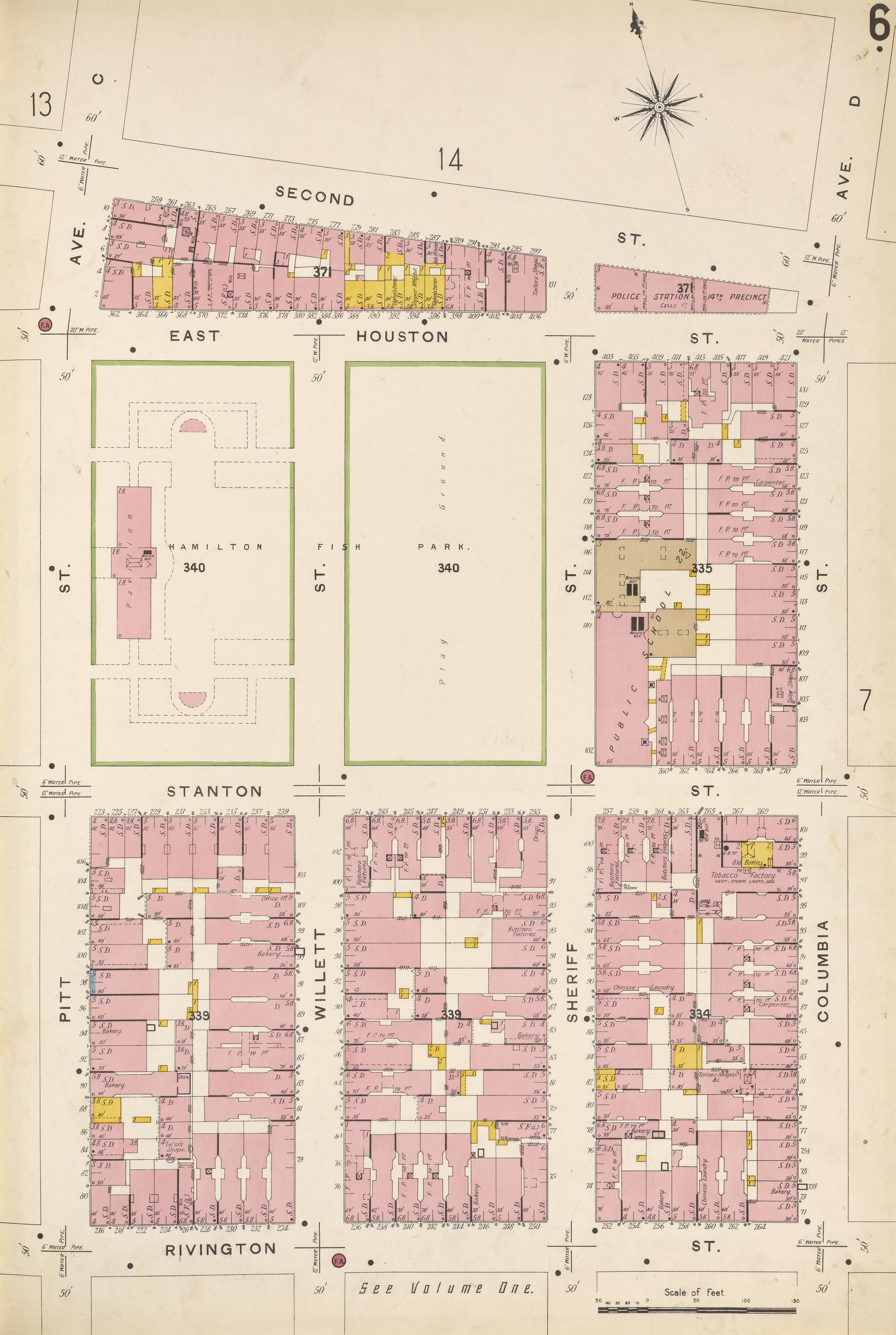
Map of the park site in 1903, showing the park site at center left. Willett Street passes through the park site, while Sheriff Street is on the east.

Hamilton Fish Park is on the Lower East Side of Manhattan in New York City, bounded by Stanton Street, the Gompers Houses, and the Masaryk Towers to the south; Pitt Street to the west; Houston Street to the north; and the NEST+m campus and the New York Public Library's Hamilton Fish Park Branch to the east. The park covers 4.30 acres (1.74 ha). When completed in 1900, Hamilton Fish Park had been bisected by Willett Street, which ran from north to south; the two city blocks were ultimately combined. Hamilton Fish Park's eastern boundary was originally Sheriff Street, which was eliminated in 1959.

The western end of Hamilton Fish Park contains the Hamilton Fish Recreation Center, a Beaux-Arts brick-and-limestone building on Pitt Street. The center of the park contains the pool complex, while the remainder of the park is devoted to other recreational facilities. Much of the space in Hamilton Fish Park consists of decks or paths with red brick pavers reflecting the design of the recreation center. A steel fence with shrubbery encloses the park. There are two entrances: one through the Hamilton Fish Recreation Center and the other at the corner of Pitt and Houston Streets.

=== Recreational facilities ===
Hamilton Fish Park's recreational facilities take up much of its area. The largest facility is the pool area at the center of the park, which is aligned from west to east, with two pools. South of the pool area, the eastern part of the park contains two basketball courts and four handball courts. North of the pool area is a playground.

==== Pools ====
The Hamilton Fish Pool complex, designed by Aymar Embury II, was one of 11 WPA pools in New York City completed in 1936. With a capacity of 1,700 or 2,200, the Hamilton Fish Pool complex was relatively small compared to the other WPA pools in the city. The complex is also known locally as the "Pitt Pool".

The main pool, in the center of the park, is rectangular and measures about 165 by 98 feet (50 by 30 m), with a capacity of 485,000 U.S. gallons (1,840,000 L; 404,000 imp gal). (Note: A less precise measurement of 165 by 100 feet (50 by 30 m) is also given.) Its depth varies from 3.5 to 4.5 feet (1.1 to 1.4 m). The nearly semicircular pool to the west measures 98 feet across at its eastern end, with a length of 67 feet (20 m). This pool was originally a diving pool with a depth of 11.5 feet (3.5 m), holding some 375,000 U.S. gallons (1,420,000 L; 312,000 imp gal). In a 1992 renovation, it was converted into a children's pool 2.5 inches (64 mm) deep. There was previously also a wading pool in the park's northeastern corner, measuring 50 by 100 feet (15 by 30 m).

The pools are surrounded by a red tile promenade 25 feet (7.6 m) wide. There were originally bleachers flanking the diving pool, which were removed in the 1992 renovation. The eastern, or rear, portion of the pool area contains Beaux-Arts maintenance facilities, including a filter house measuring 34 by 122 feet (10 by 37 m). Surrounding the pool area are lockers.

=== Recreation center ===
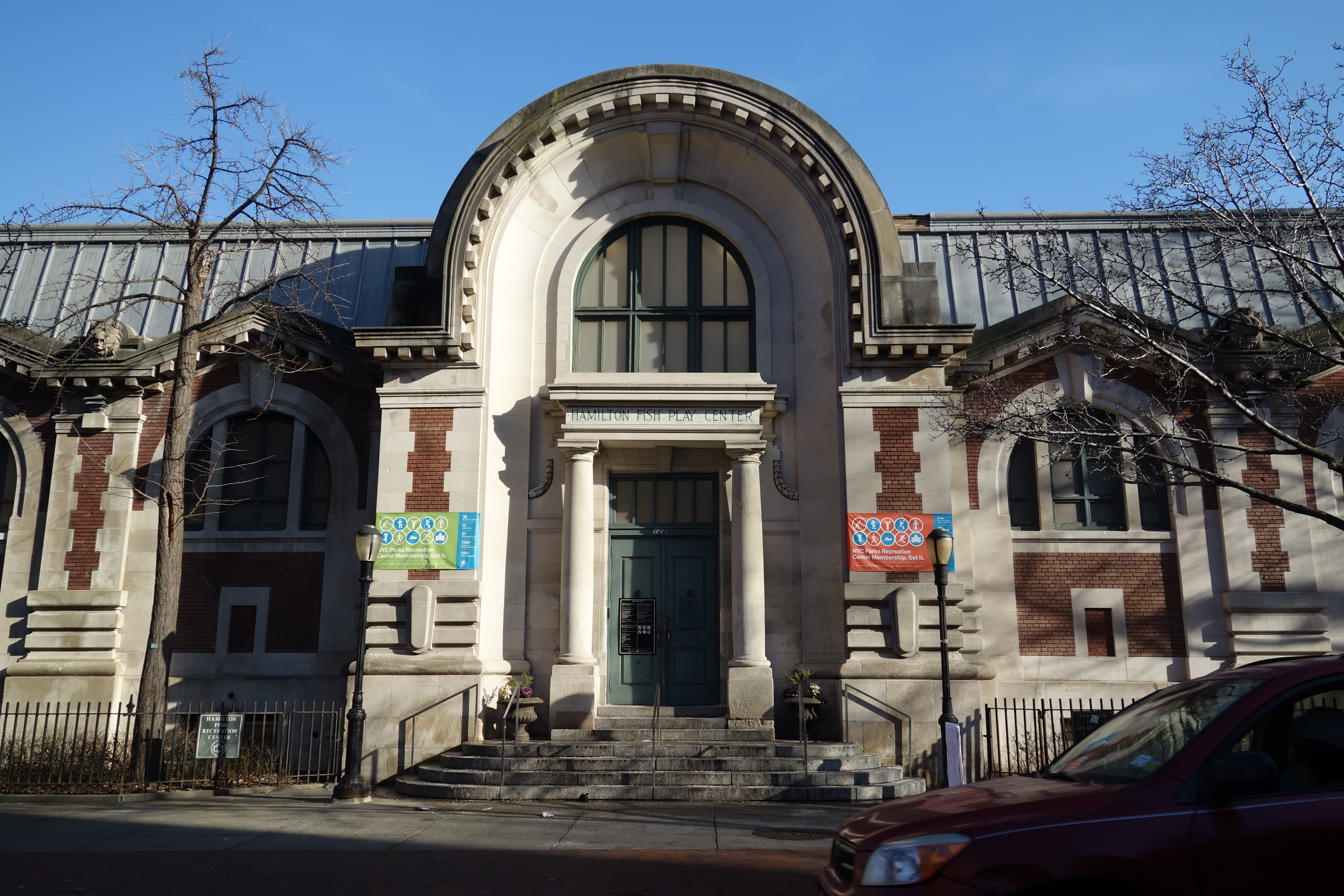
Western facade of the Hamilton Fish Recreation Center

The Hamilton Fish Recreation Center is at 128 Pitt Street. Designed by Carrère and Hastings in 1900 as a gymnasium, it is the only remaining portion of the park's original plan. Carrère and Hastings had been chosen as architects largely on the success of their design for the Cathedral of St. John the Divine in Morningside Heights, Manhattan, and were simultaneously designing the New York Public Library Main Branch in Midtown. The recreation center's design was inspired by the Petit Palais in Paris, which had been designed by Charles Girault and completed in 1900 to high acclaim. The recreation center extends north–south for 160 feet (49 m) and is two stories tall.

The western and eastern facades are each composed of seven bays and are nearly identical, while the northern and southern facades are one bay wide and are identical. There are tall arches at the centers of the western and eastern facades, accessed by short flights of stairs. The western arch is the main entrance from Pitt Street and the eastern arch is the pool entrance. The top of each arch is surrounded by a stone cornice with modillions. The sides of each arch are brick piers with stone quoins, which rest atop a base of smooth stone blocks and limestone dados. Within each arched opening is a rectangular doorway with Doric-style columns and a flat lintel, which is topped by a six-pane semicircular window. The arch on the eastern side differs only in that it has an octagonal chimney and formerly had a clock. On the eastern side is a brick wheelchair ramp leading up to the main lobby.

The other bays on all facades are made of brick and stone, with a modillioned cornice that peaks slightly above each bay. The lower section of each bay is filled with brick and stone, while the upper section contains an arched window with a keystone carved in stone. The piers separating each bay are similar in design to those flanking the main and pool entrances but have ornamented lions' heads at the top. The mansard roof is clad in copper, which is interrupted at the center by the rotunda atop the lobby. The rotunda contains a skylight.

The recreation center has 13,400 square feet (1,240 m^{2}) of space. Inside the main entrance is a brick entrance rotunda. As built, there were two gymnasiums north and south of the lobby, each measuring 60 feet 5.46 inches (18 m) with a wood-beam ceiling. The northern gymnasium was for men while the southern one was for women. The basement contained boiler and coal storage rooms, as well as lockers, toilets, and showers for each gender. During a 1936 renovation by the Works Progress Administration (WPA), the gymnasiums became changing rooms, while showers were installed in the basements. Unlike at other WPA facilities, there were clothes checks rather than lockers. It was again renovated in 1992, becoming a community center. The first floor was converted into two community rooms with interiors of terrazzo and marble, while the changing rooms were relocated to the basement. The wood trusses supporting the roof are visible inside the community rooms.

== History ==
Many immigrants to New York City in the late 19th and early 20th centuries moved into crowded tenements on the Lower East Side, many of which had little fresh air or light. An 1897 report characterized New York City's Tenth Ward, in the southern part of the modern Lower East Side, as "the worst specimen of city overcrowding in the world", with 70,168 residents in the ward's 109 acres (44 ha). The Eleventh Ward to the north, in which Hamilton Fish Park would be built, had 86,722 residents in 213 acres (86 ha), and was also considered overcrowded.

=== Planning and construction ===
To combat overcrowding, the New York State Legislature had passed a law in 1887, allowing the city's Board of Street Opening and Improvement to select and develop sites for small parks. A group called the Committee of Seventy commissioned a report in 1895 to determine the effect of the small-parks legislation. The report found that only a small number of park sites in Lower Manhattan were selected, of which none had been developed. The committee urged the city to take "urgent and immediate action" in creating additional small parks. The State Legislature passed a bill in April 1895, compelling the Board of Street Opening to select at least two park sites in the region south of 4th Street, and east of the Bowery and Catherine Street, within two years. The Board considered several sites, ultimately deciding in April 1896 to acquire a two-block site bounded by Houston, Sheriff, Pitt, and Stanton Streets, which included a city block nicknamed "Bone Alley". The latter block, with 1,650 residents, was largely occupied by Italians, Poles, Germans, Hungarians, and Russians. The two blocks' cost was assessed at $746,000.

The park site was named in 1897 for former New York governor and U.S. secretary of state Hamilton Fish, who grew up in the neighborhood. The 3.66-acre (1.48 ha) site ultimately cost $1.7 million to acquire. The park site had been cleared by 1898, but no further work was performed because of a lack of funds. Carrère and Hastings were hired to design the park grounds and recreation building, while Kelly & Kelly were awarded the contract to build the park. A $10,000 bond issue to fund construction was proposed in January 1899. Work started that April, but the bond issue was not approved until July. That September, a further $100,000 was appropriated for the park's development. In total, the park cost $183,000 to develop. The cost was criticized by parks commissioner George C. Clausen, who delayed the park's opening by one week because of his objections to the park features, such as the recreation building's small size.

=== Opening and early years ===
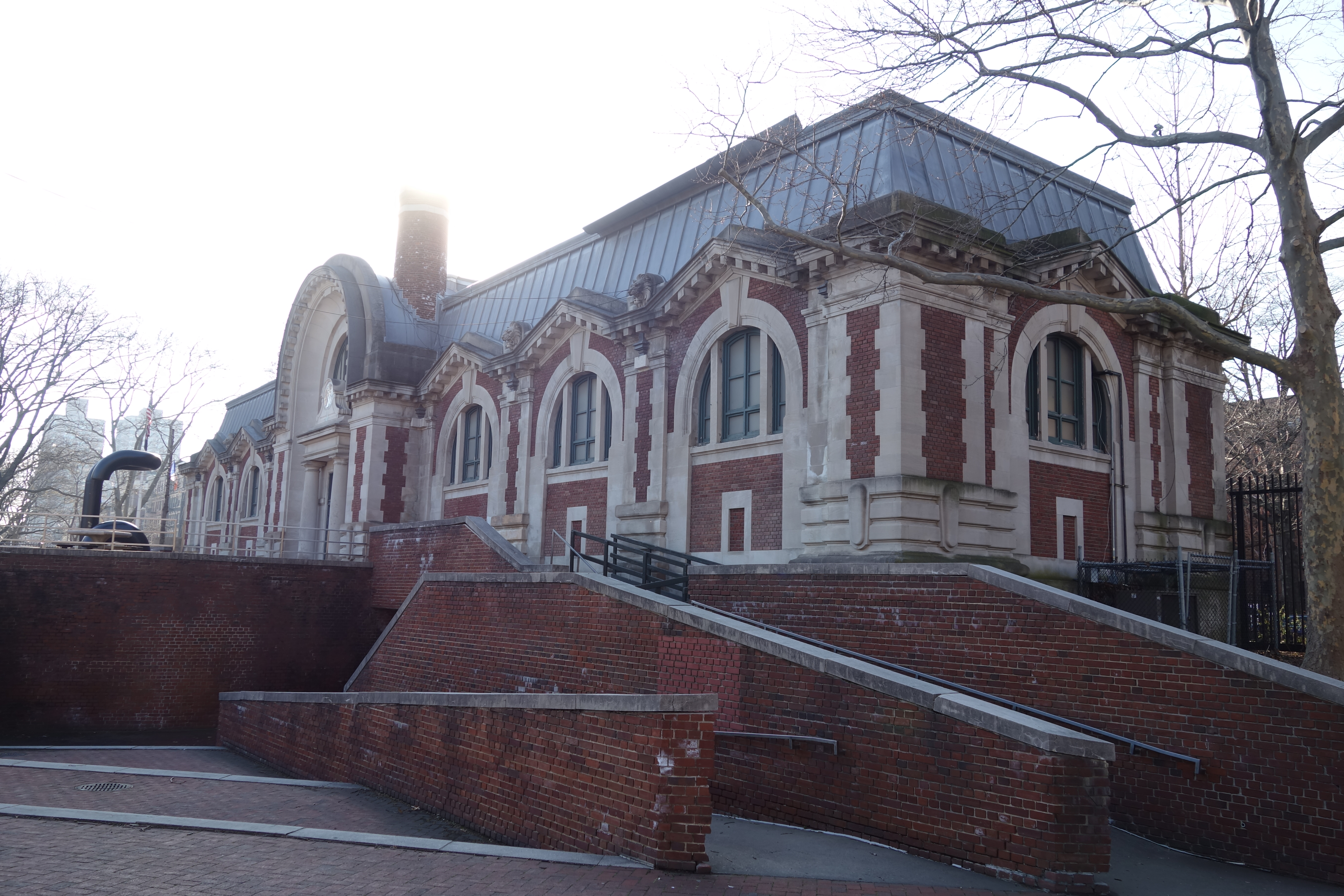
The eastern and northern facades of the Hamilton Fish Recreation Center, designed as part of the original park

Hamilton Fish Park was formally opened on June 1, 1900, with a ceremony attended by almost 10,000 children. It was the only park opened under the administration of Mayor Robert Anderson Van Wyck. As completed, Hamilton Fish Park contained baths, gymnasiums, and running tracks on either side of the main recreation building, as well as limestone pavilions on the north and south ends of the grounds, although the building's interior was unfurnished due to a lack of funds. The park also had rows of trees, benches, and water fountains, giving it a formal appearance. The park was lit by four large poles with electric lights. There was a playground near Willett Street, which was retained through the park site. The Brickbuilder wrote that "a larger amount of space has been left for children's playground than is usual in such cases". Carrère and Hastings had intended Hamilton Fish Park as a passive recreation area, though it was also used for large events, such as a campaign speech by William Jennings Bryan during the 1900 United States presidential election. The park was so intensively used that it was closed within a year of its opening.

The Parks Department reported in 1902 it was planning to construct playgrounds, as well as baths and other facilities in the recreation building. The media wrote that Hamilton Fish Park had been badly damaged because of "the radical defects of the original plan and to the strenuous nature of the youth of the neighborhood". The park reopened on October 3, 1903. Asphalt walks, a running track, an athletic field, and tennis courts were added, while the recreation building received indoor gymnasiums for boys and girls.

The rebuilt gymnasium was deemed too small for recreation; by October 1904, the city's Committee on Buildings was investigating the building's "availability for school purposes". The following year, boys from the surrounding neighborhood held elections for "mayor" of the park, with the victor being sworn in at the gymnasium. Hamilton Fish Park also held large events such as pageants, opera productions, and political rallies. By 1911, the four large electric lampposts had been removed and replaced with smaller lamps, and the gymnasium had been reopened for a dance. Hamilton Fish Park was so popular that the Real Estate Record and Guide wrote in 1912, "On winter evenings room cannot be found to accommodate not only the large number of individuals, but the considerable number of independent social and athletic organizations in that neighborhood."

Some improvements were made to Hamilton Fish Park in the late 1920s. A budget of $1,100 was set aside in 1927 for the construction of a wading pool at the park. The wading pool, to be installed in the western part of the park, could be used as an ice rink in the winter. The wading pool opened in July 1929, and a fence was installed around the pool in 1931.

=== Works Progress Administration renovations ===
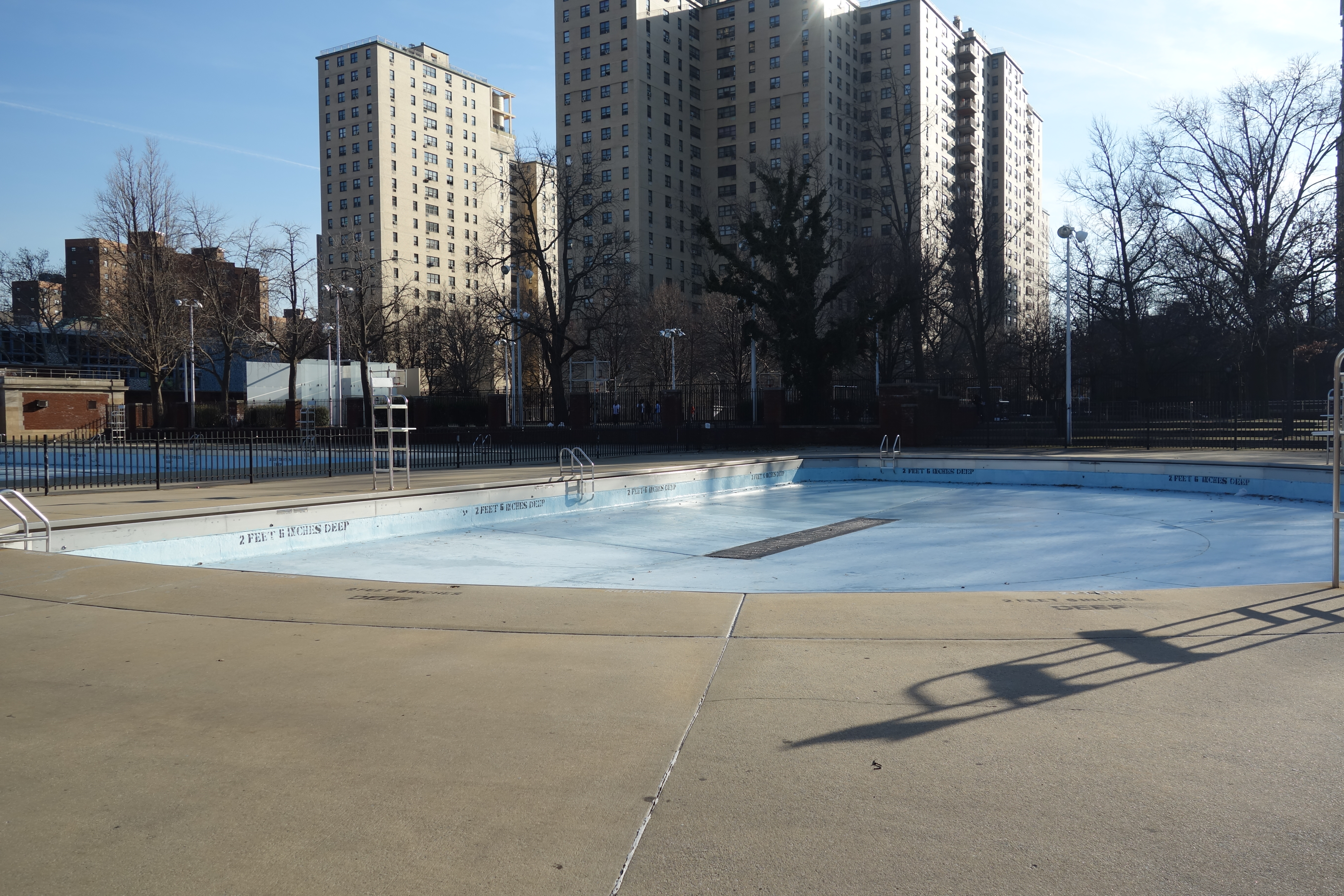
Pool area as seen in the winter

In 1934, Mayor Fiorello H. La Guardia nominated Robert Moses to become commissioner of a unified New York City Department of Parks and Recreation. At the time, the United States was experiencing the Great Depression; immediately after La Guardia won the 1933 election, Moses began to write "a plan for putting 80,000 men to work on 1,700 relief projects". By the time he was in office, several hundred such projects were underway across the city.

Moses was especially interested in creating new pools and other bathing facilities, such as those in Jacob Riis Park, Jones Beach, and Orchard Beach. He devised a list of 23 pools around the city, including one at Hamilton Fish Park. The pools would be built using funds from the Works Progress Administration (WPA), a federal agency created as part of the New Deal to combat the Depression's negative effects. Eleven of these pools were to be designed concurrently and open in 1936. Moses, along with the architects Aymar Embury II and Gilmore David Clarke, created a common design for these proposed aquatic centers. Each location was to have distinct pools for diving, swimming, and wading; bleachers and viewing areas; and bathhouses with locker rooms that could be used as gymnasiums. The pools were to have several common features, such as a minimum 55-yard (50 m) length, underwater lighting, heating, and filtration, all constructed using inexpensive materials. The bathhouses would be near "comfort stations", additional playgrounds, and spruced-up landscapes.

The Hamilton Fish and Highbridge Pools were the first to begin construction, with work commencing in October 1934. Hamilton Fish Park was the only facility that did not receive a new bathhouse as part of the program. (Note: Betsy Head Park's bathhouse was also not slated to be replaced by the WPA, but that bathhouse burned down in 1938 and was rebuilt shortly afterward.) Embury filed plans for $278,500 worth of improvements to Hamilton Fish Park in March 1935. These included the construction of a new building with a filter house and comfort station; two additional standalone comfort stations; and alterations to convert the existing gymnasium into a bathhouse. The project also included the main and diving pools in the park's center; volleyball, tennis, handball, and shuffleboard courts; and a children's play structure. The gymnasium's interior was completely rebuilt. The section of Willett Street running through the park was eliminated, and fences were installed around the pool area to separate it from the rest of the park. The basement of the bathhouse was extended to house mechanical equipment. By mid-1936, ten of the eleven WPA-funded pools were completed and were being opened at a rate of one per week. The Hamilton Fish Pool was the first of the 11 WPA pools to open, (Note: The pools opened in the following chronological order: Hamilton Fish Park, Thomas Jefferson Park, Astoria Park, Tompkinsville Pool, Highbridge Park, Sunset Park, Crotona Park, McCarren Park, Betsy Head Park, Colonial Park, and Red Hook Park.) with a ceremony held on June 24, 1936.

=== Mid-20th century ===
The Hamilton Fish Pool was held in high regard through the 1950s, with the United States Olympic team using the pool for practice in advance of the 1952 Summer Olympics. Sheriff Street on the park's eastern boundary, as well as Stanton Street on the southern boundary, were closed and removed in 1959 to make way for the Gompers Houses to the southwest and the Masaryk Towers to the southeast. The Gompers Houses were completed in 1964, while the Masaryk Towers were finished in 1966. Sheriff Street was retained as an alley on the eastern side of the park, and in a 1960 revision to the city's street map, was incorporated into the park itself. The original bathhouse was proposed for demolition in 1964 so Pitt Street could be widened. A new glass-and-metal bathhouse by Brown, Lawford & Forbes would have been built above the filter house on the eastern side of the pool, with a capacity of 825 women and 1,700 men. The street widening, which never took place, was proposed as part of a conversion of Houston Street into a major connecting road between two highways.

The Lower East Side saw an influx of African Americans and Puerto Ricans after World War II, and Asian Americans began moving in after the mid-1960s. By then, the influence of the Jewish and eastern European groups declined as many of these residents had left the area, and the Lower East Side experienced a period of "persistent poverty, crime, drugs, and abandoned housing". By the 1970s, Hamilton Fish Park and other city parks were in poor condition following the 1975 New York City fiscal crisis. After an employee, 16-year-old Gary Caserta, was killed in 1973, Hamilton Fish Park was described by an NYC Parks administrator as "among our worst problem areas". The bathhouse was boarded up and covered in graffiti. The area was so dangerous that mayor Abraham Beame held a publicized walking tour in 1974 to persuade residents the area was safe from crime. NYC Parks only had 2,900 employees in its total staff by 1981, less than 10 percent of the 30,000 present when Moses was parks commissioner.

=== Late 20th century to present ===
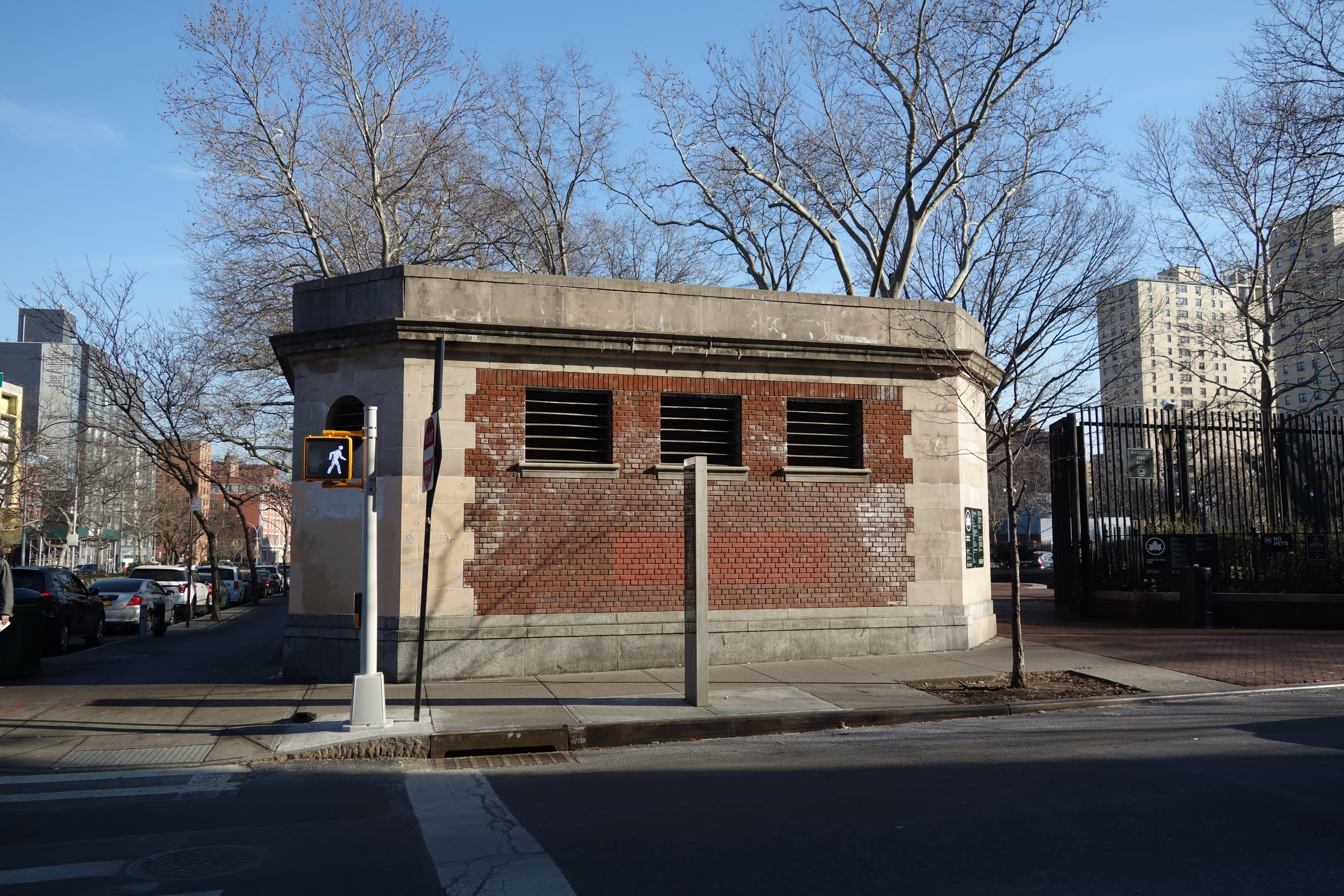
An auxiliary building at Pitt and Houston Streets

In the early 1980s, residents of the surrounding area founded the Committee to Save Hamilton Fish Park. Through the committee's efforts, the New York City Landmarks Preservation Commission (LPC) designated the recreation center as a New York City landmark in 1982, although the pool was not designated as a landmark. The NYC Parks budget had increased greatly by 1982, and the agency set aside $6 million for a renovation designed by John Ciardullo. The plans from Ciardullo had been developed in 1978, but no money had been made available at the time.

The Committee to Save Hamilton Fish Park and local resident Sammy Fleischer pushed for the Hamilton Fish Pool to be renovated. Although the renovation of Hamilton Fish Park was initially left out of NYC Parks' 1987 capital budget, the advocates persuaded the city to allocate $11.3 million for the pool's renovation in 1987. During the renovation, the main pool was enlarged, the diving pool was turned into a wading pool, and the recreational facilities and the bathhouse's exterior were restored. The main entrance was relocated away from the bathhouse building, and three brick structures were built for lockers. The design also included installing a fence around the park, as well as reducing the number of entrances from six to two. The renovation was completed in June 1992 for $14 million. According to architectural historian Robert A. M. Stern, the renovation "proved a real shot in the arm" for the restoration of the Lower East Side. Architectural critic Herbert Muschamp stated that the revived park was "not an elixer [sic] for every urban ill [but was] a powerful tonic against despair."

The LPC considered designating the city's other ten WPA pools as official landmarks in 1990, but the Hamilton Fish Park Pool was excluded from consideration because it had been so heavily modified over the years. Fleischer, who was credited by local residents as the major advocate for the pool's restoration, sought to name the pool for himself. The pool was renamed in his honor in 1993, but parks commissioner Henry Stern (no relation to Robert Stern) ordered most of the new name plaques removed the next year. Henry Stern subsequently recalled that the pool's renaming may have been personally approved by his predecessor Betsy Gotbaum, rather than being approved by the New York City Council.

NYC Parks continued to face financial shortfalls in the coming years, and the pools retained a reputation for high crime. For the summer of 1991, mayor David Dinkins had planned to close all 32 outdoor pools in the city, a decision that was only reversed after a $2 million donation from a trust created upon the death of real estate developer Sol Goldman and $1.8 million from other sources. Additionally, in the 1990s, a practice called "whirlpooling" became common in New York City pools such as Hamilton Fish Park, in which women would be inappropriately fondled by teenage boys. By the turn of the century, crimes such as sexual assaults had decreased in parks citywide due to increased security. A squash court, operated by nonprofit Public Squash, opened in 2018 at one of Hamilton Fish Park's handball courts. The court, the city's first public outdoor squash court, was in an enclosure measuring 18.5 feet (5.6 m) tall with a surface area of 20 by 32 feet (6.1 by 9.8 m). A renovation of the park's playground commenced in June 2021.

== See also ==
- List of New York City Designated Landmarks in Manhattan below 14th Street
