= Sunset Park (Brooklyn park) =

Public park in Brooklyn, New York

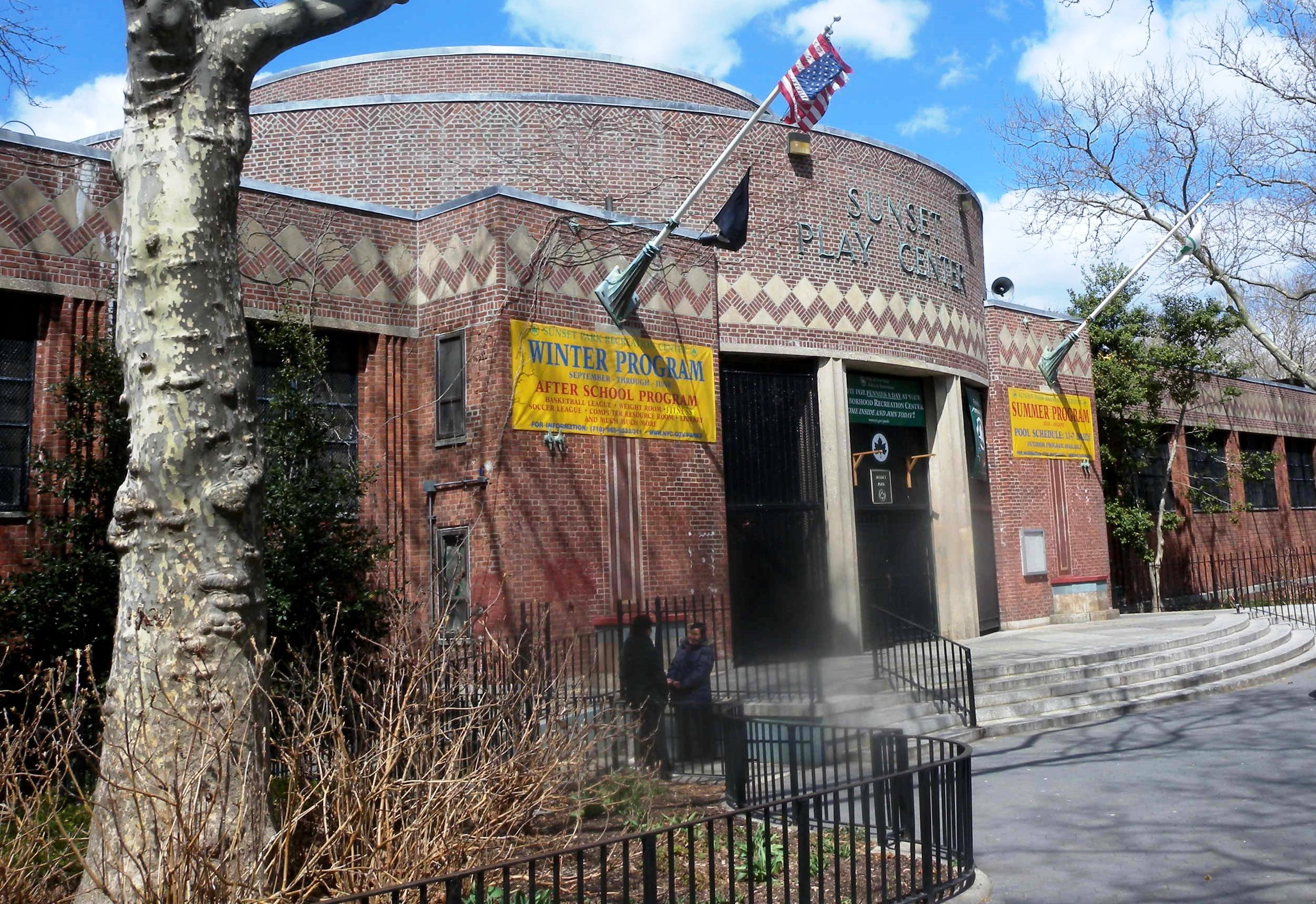
- Exterior of the Sunset Play Center
- Interactive map of Sunset Park
- Location: Sunset Park, Brooklyn, New York
- Nearest city: New York City
- Coordinates: 40°38′53″N 74°00′13″W
- Area: 24.5 acres (9.9 ha)
- Created: 1891
- Operator: New York City Department of Parks and Recreation
- Open: 7 a.m. to 10 p.m.
- Status: open

New York City Landmark
- Designated: July 24, 2007
- Reference no.: 2242
- Designated entity: Bathhouse facade and pool

New York City Landmark
- Designated: July 24, 2007
- Reference no.: 2243
- Designated entity: Bathhouse interior

Sunset Park is a 24.5-acre (9.9 ha) public park in the neighborhood of Sunset Park, Brooklyn, New York City, between 41st and 44th Streets and 5th and 7th Avenues. The modern-day park contains a playground, recreation center, splash pad, basketball courts, soccer field, and pool. The recreation center and pool comprise the Sunset Play Center, which was designated as both an exterior and interior landmark by the New York City Landmarks Preservation Commission. The park is operated by the New York City Department of Parks and Recreation, also known as NYC Parks.

The land for the park was acquired from 1891 to 1905. The park initially contained a pond, golf course, rustic shelter, and carousel. These features were removed in 1935–1936 when the current neoclassical/Art Deco style pool was built by Aymar Embury II during a Works Progress Administration project. The swimming pool and play center were renovated from 1983 to 1984.

== Description ==
Sunset Park is between Fifth Avenue to the west, Seventh Avenue to the east, 41st Street to the north, and 44th Street to the south, atop a 164-foot-tall (50 m) hill that is part of the Harbor Hill Moraine, a terminal moraine formed during the Last Glacial Period. The park's elevated location offers views of New York Harbor, Manhattan, the Statue of Liberty, and more distantly the hills of Staten Island and the U.S. state of New Jersey. Initially, Sunset Park contained a pond within its borders. According to Sergey Kadinsky, author of the book Hidden Waters of New York City, the pond was likely artificial since it did not appear on any maps prior to the park's creation. The pond was destroyed in 1935 with the construction of the current swimming pool. The Sunset Park Memorial Grove was planted in 2002 to commemorate victims of the September 11 attacks.

=== Recreation fields ===
Sunset Park contains numerous sporting fields. Within the namesake recreation center, there is an indoor basketball court, seven table tennis tables, a gymnasium and a billiard table. Outdoors, there are four basketball courts, two handball courts, two soccer fields, and a baseball field overlapping with one of the soccer fields. There is also a playground at Sixth Avenue. The outdoor fields are free for use by the general public, but some indoor activities require a membership.

=== Sunset Play Center ===
==== Bathhouse ====
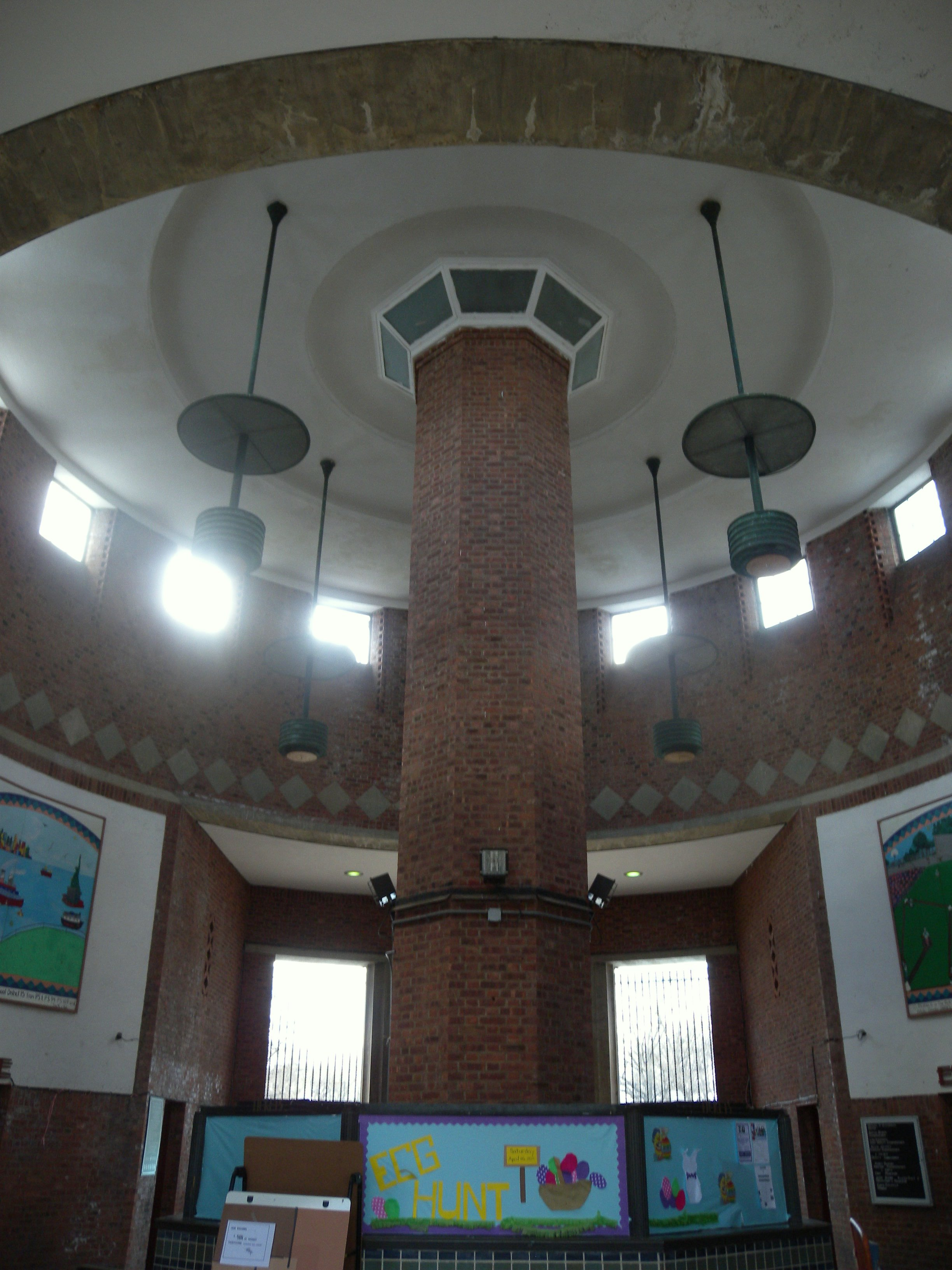
Interior of the Sunset Play Center's bathhouse

The Sunset Play Center's bathhouse is on the eastern side of Sunset Park. The building contains a facade of brick in Flemish bond, and consists of a 1 1/2-story rotunda with one-story wings to the north and south, giving it a rough I-shape. The main entrance to the bath house, the eastern facade at Seventh Avenue, is approached by a short granite stairway, though there is also a handicap-accessible ramp to the south of the steps. It leads directly to the rotunda. A back entrance, from the west, leads directly to the swimming pool. The top of the building facade is wrapped with a motif composed of cast stone and brick chevrons, set in a pattern of diamonds and triangles. The interior of the rotunda contains a similar motif along the top of the wall.

The rotunda is a cylindrical brick structure. Seen from its eastern facade, the rotunda is between and set behind two piers made of Flemish bond brick, each of which contain a flagpole and tile panel. The words sunset play center are inscribed in a granite tablet above the main (eastern) entrance; the entrance itself consists of a set of metal doors. The western entrance, facing the pool, is nearly identical but does not contain flagpoles, and a large NYC Parks logo is hung above that entrance's metal doors. Inside the building, the wall is mostly made of Flemish bond brick with a granite base. The lobby is inside the rotunda and is composed of three parts: the foyer leading east to the entrance, the central cylinder, and the foyer leading west to the pool. The foyers are one story high while the center cylinder is one and a half stories. The curved outer wall is topped by a lintel made of concrete. Light fixtures hang from the white-plaster ceiling. At the clerestory level, near the top of the lobby, there are 16 small windows. The floor is made of dark blue and terracotta tiling and contains several drains.

The north and south wings of the bathhouse are nearly identical in design, except that the northern wing is on a downward slope and contains a basement garage. The eastern facades each contain seven steel windows with metal screens and stone sills. There are five windows of similar style at the end of each wing. Both the north and south wings are connected to brick retaining walls that enclose the pool area to the west. The men's locker room is to the south of the rotunda while the women's locker room is to the north.

==== Pool ====
West of the bathhouse, Sunset Park contains an enclosed elliptical pool area that is aligned north-south. The main swimming pool is rectangular and measures 256 by 165 feet (78 by 50 m), (Note: Dimensions of the main pool are alternatively given as 259 by 162 feet (79 by 49 m).) with a depth of 3.5 feet (1.1 m). There were also two semicircular 165-foot-diameter (50 m) pools for wading and diving, one on either end of the main pool, though these are no longer in use. The deck surrounding all three pools is made of cement. The western part of the deck contains concrete bleachers with seven rows, underneath which is the filter house. A brick wall is behind the bleachers, and is adjacent to the handball courts to the west. A pump house is to the north of the bleachers. A former "comfort station" or restroom (now used as storage space) is to the south, with separate entrances for boys and girls on the north facade, but these have been bricked up.

The diving pool was to the south of the main rectangular pool, but has been filled in for use as a volleyball court. The wading pool, to the north of the main pool, still exists but has been drained, and spray fountains have been installed. Both pools are surrounded by a metal fence on their curved side, which contain Flemish-bond brick piers. A brick wall separates the wading pool from the main pool. Steps run along the curved side of the wading pool, and there is a concrete ramp leading to the wading pool area.

== History ==
=== Early history ===
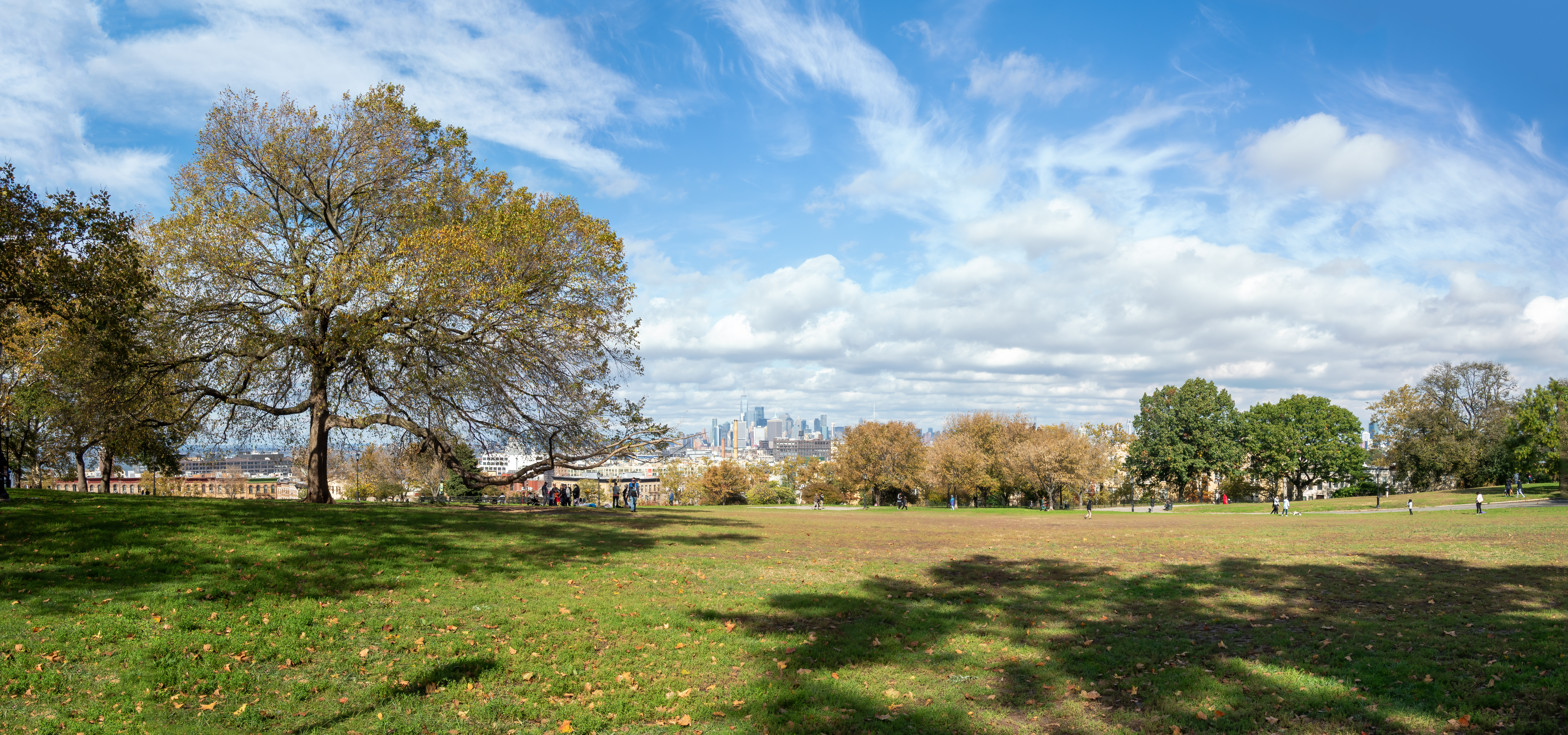
Looking northwest from Sunset Park, with Manhattan in the background

Sunset Park originally consisted of four blocks of land, from Fifth to Seventh Avenues between 41st and 43rd Streets. The city of Brooklyn acquired the land on May 15, 1891, as part of its plan to build several parks citywide, including Winthrop, Bedford and Bushwick parks. The previous landowner was Patrick H. Flynn, a contractor who, according to the Brooklyn Daily Eagle, "sold the park department the site for the proposed Sunset Park in the Eighth Ward without consulting the owners. Then he went around and bought up the property at a low figure and is said to have made a good thing out of it." The Eagle itself praised the site as having "one of the finest views in the city". A New York Times reporter, writing in 1894, praised the "magnificent views of earth and sky and water" that could be experienced from the high point of Sunset Park, some 200 feet (61 m) above sea level.

Sunset Park became a popular gathering place for residents of the area (then considered part of Bay Ridge and South Brooklyn), and its initial users were mostly Polish and Scandinavian immigrants who had arrived within the last two decades. However, development of the park was precluded by its irregular topography. By 1893, the city of Brooklyn decided to expand Sunset Park southward. A New York Times article that year observed that the park lacked amenities and was situated on high bluffs that could only be reached by 60-foot (18 m) ladders. Furthermore, the article stated that it would cost at least $500,000 to improve the park. In 1899, the city of New York constructed a six-hole golf course in Sunset Park, and started some other improvements such as installing retaining walls. Even so, the Eagle observed that the park was still lacking basic amenities such as benches or drinking fountains. The park was expanded southward to 44th Street in 1904. Other features added in the first decade of the 20th century included a new landscaping, a pond, a Neoclassical rustic shelter, and a carousel. Concerts started being held by 1906, and a grand staircase to Fifth Avenue was completed by 1910.

The surrounding neighborhood, south of Green-Wood Cemetery and east of Fourth Avenue, was mostly undeveloped at the time. After the Fifth Avenue elevated line was extended south from 36th Street to 65th Street on October 1, 1893, development came rapidly. Residential construction boomed in the late 19th and early 20th century amid real estate speculation initiated by the construction of the park and the Fifth Avenue elevated line and, by 1909, there was significant development surrounding the park. With the news that the New York City Subway's Fourth Avenue Line would constructed in the area, two-story houses were constructed on the south side of Sunset Park. Two-story houses were the most common housing stock in this part of South Brooklyn at the time; the Eagle said that two-family houses were "particularly attractive to people who desire comparatively small apartments, but who object to living in flats, and they appeal to this class on account of their being more quiet, and possibly, more exclusive." The Fourth Avenue subway opened to 59th Street in 1915, further spurring the growth of the surrounding neighborhood as a low-rise middle-class area, and in particular the Finnish enclave directly south of the park.

=== Works Progress Administration renovation ===
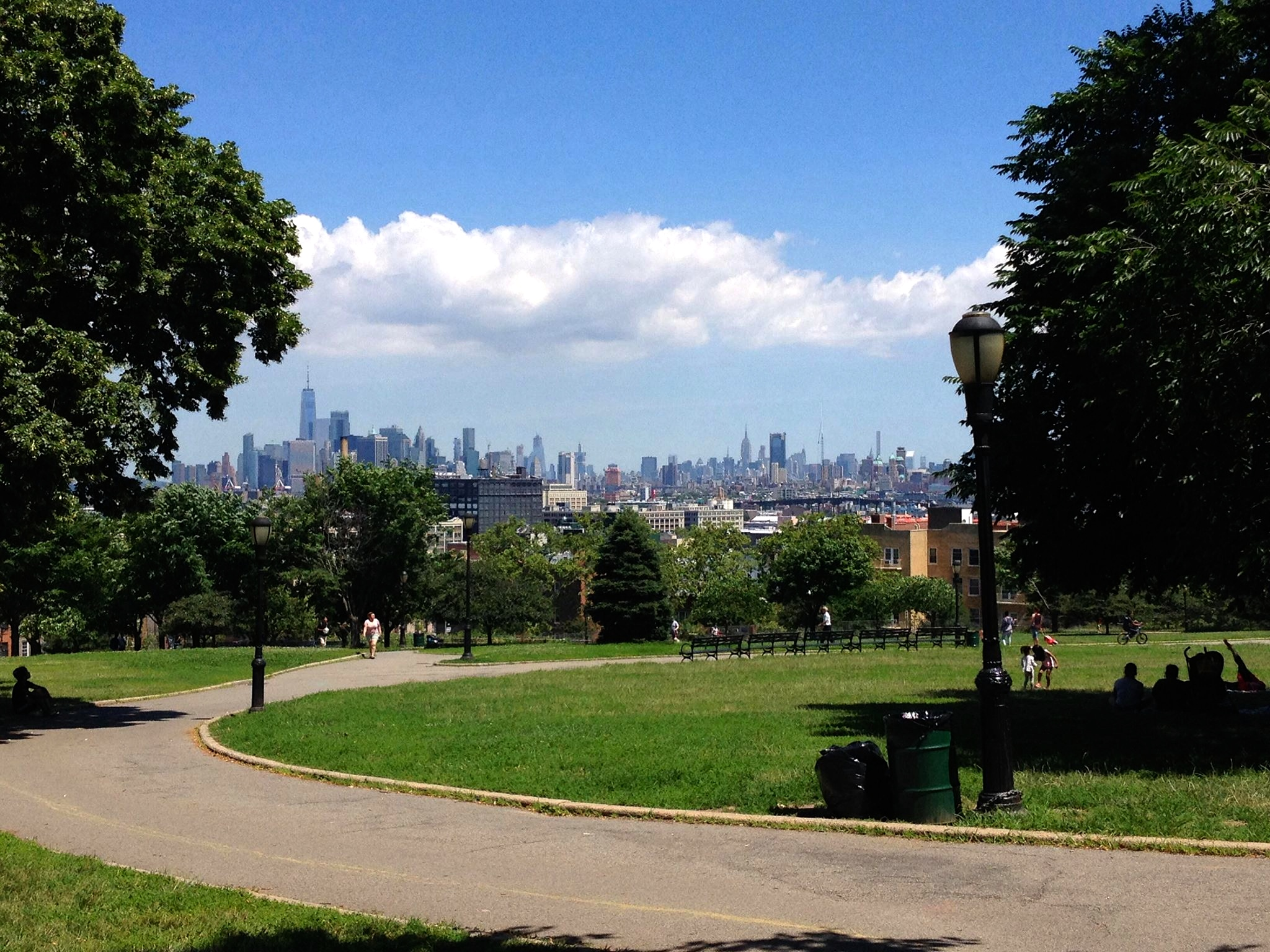
Looking north toward Manhattan

In 1934, mayor Fiorello H. La Guardia nominated Robert Moses to become commissioner of a unified New York City Department of Parks and Recreation. At the time, the United States was experiencing the Great Depression; immediately after La Guardia won the 1933 election, Moses began to write "a plan for putting 80,000 men to work on 1,700 relief projects". By the time he was in office, several hundred such projects were underway across the city.

Moses was especially interested in creating new pools and other bathing facilities, such as those in Jacob Riis Park, Jones Beach, and Orchard Beach. He devised a list of 23 pools around the city, including one at Sunset Park. The pools would be built using funds from the Works Progress Administration (WPA), a federal agency created as part of the New Deal to combat the Depression's negative effects. Eleven of these pools were to be designed concurrently and open in 1936. Moses, along with the architects Aymar Embury II and Gilmore David Clarke, created a common design for each of the 11 proposed aquatic centers. Each location was to have distinct pools for diving, swimming, and wading; bleachers and viewing areas; and bathhouses with locker rooms that could be used as gymnasiums. The pools were to have several common features, such as a minimum 55-yard (50 m) length, underwater lighting, heating, and filtration, all constructed using inexpensive materials. To fit the requirement for efficiency and low-cost construction, each building would be built using elements of the Streamline Moderne and Classical architectural styles. The buildings would also be near "comfort stations", additional playgrounds, and spruced-up landscapes.

Construction for some of the 11 pools began in October 1934. The pond, golf course, rustic shelter, and carousel were removed to make way for the new pool at Sunset Park, which would be on the park's eastern side. The blueprints for the Sunset Park pool were submitted to the New York City Department of Buildings in August 1935, by which point WPA workers were already working at the site. During construction, several Native American artifacts were found at the site of the old pond. By mid-1936, ten of the eleven WPA-funded pools were completed and were being opened at a pace of one per week. The Sunset Pool was the sixth of these pools to open. (Note: The pools opened in the following chronological order: Hamilton Fish Park, Thomas Jefferson Park, Astoria Park, Tompkinsville Pool, Highbridge Park, Sunset Park, Crotona Park, McCarren Park, Betsy Head Park, Colonial Park, and Red Hook Park.) The pool was dedicated on July 20, 1936, with a crowd of 3,500 spectators. The center, the first of four planned WPA pools in Brooklyn, was composed of a one-story bathhouse with a capacity of 4,850; a 256-by-165-foot (78 by 50 m) pool; and two semicircular 165-foot-diameter (50 m) pools for wading and diving.

In 1938, the city announced that it would rebuild the western section of Sunset Park as well. By the next year, a WPA project was underway for the western part of the park. A steep 65-foot (20 m) slope was reduced to 40 feet (12 m) to lessen erosion, and a soldiers' monument was relocated. In addition, new concrete-block paths and drainage had been laid and an old comfort station had been destroyed. Plans for minor modifications to the Sunset Play Center were filed in September 1940. By the early 1940s, WPA workers had finished the landscaping of the site, including new plantings, lawn restoration, and other rehabilitation.

=== Later years ===
Sunset Park in the evening, 2026

By the 1970s, Sunset Park and other city parks were in poor condition following the 1975 New York City fiscal crisis. NYC Parks commenced a project to restore the pools in several parks in 1977, including at Sunset Park, for whose restoration the agency set aside an estimated $5.8 million (equivalent to $24,016,000 in 2025). These projects were not carried out due to a lack of money. By March 1981, NYC Parks had only 2,900 employees in its total staff, less than 10 percent of the 30,000 present when Moses was parks commissioner. Despite the revitalization of the surrounding neighborhood, partially due to efforts by Asian and Latin American immigrants who moved to the area, the park was still perceived as rundown, and graffiti and vandalism were common.

In 1982, the NYC Parks budget increased greatly, enabling the agency to carry out $76 million worth of restoration projects by year's end; among these projects was the restoration of the Sunset Park pool. Work had begun by early 1983, and the complex was closed for two summer seasons while work was ongoing. The play center reopened on August 8, 1984. In addition to the renovated play center, the diving pool was infilled for the construction of a volleyball court; spray fountains at the wading pool's former site were installed in 1988; and murals were installed in the locker rooms.

NYC Parks continued to face financial shortfalls in the coming years, and the pools retained a reputation for high crime. For the summer of 1991, mayor David Dinkins had planned to close all 32 outdoor pools in the city, a decision that was only reversed after a $2 million donation from a trust created upon the death of real estate developer Sol Goldman and $1.8 million from other sources. Additionally, in the 1990s, a practice called "whirlpooling" became common in New York City pools such as Sunset Park, in which women would be inappropriately fondled by teenage boys. By the turn of the century, crimes such as sexual assaults had decreased in parks citywide due to increased security.

In 2007, the Sunset Play Center's interior and exterior were both designated as official city landmarks by the New York City Landmarks Preservation Commission. The commission had previously considered the pool for landmark status in 1990, along with the other ten WPA pools in the city. A reconstruction of the playground was completed in 2017. The same year, a $4 million renovation of the Sunset Park Play Center was approved. Following an influx of asylum seekers to New York City, in August 2023, city officials converted portions of the recreation centers at McCarren Park and Sunset Park into temporary shelters, prompting protests from local residents. The shelter had closed by the next month.

== See also ==
- Art Deco architecture of New York City
- List of New York City Designated Landmarks in Brooklyn
