= Betsy Head Park =

Public park in Brooklyn, New York

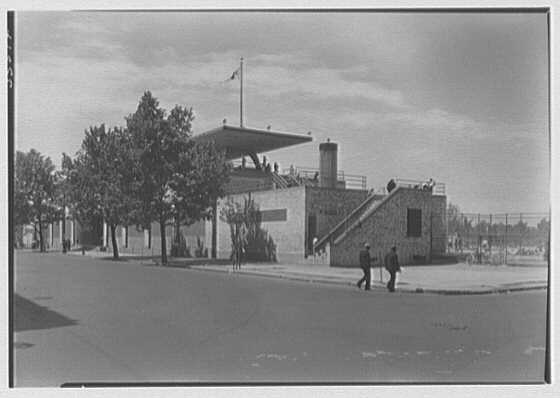
- Exterior of the Betsy Head Play Center
- Interactive map of Betsy Head Park
- Location: Brownsville, Brooklyn, New York
- Coordinates: 40°39′48″N 73°54′45″W
- Area: 10.55 acres (4.27 ha)
- Created: 1915
- Operator: New York City Department of Parks and Recreation
- Open: 6 a.m. to 1 a.m.
- Status: open

New York City Landmark
- Designated: September 16, 2008
- Reference no.: 2246
- Designated entity: Bathhouse facade and pool

Betsy Head Park is a 10.55-acre (4.27 ha) public park in the Brownsville neighborhood of Brooklyn, New York, United States. The park occupies two non-contiguous plots diagonally across from each other at the intersection of Dumont Avenue and Thomas S. Boyland Street, covering a collective 10.55 acres (4.27 ha). The modern-day park contains a playground, a swimming complex, and fields for baseball, football, tennis, and basketball. The park's swimming complex, the Betsy Head Play Center, was designed by Ely Jacques Kahn and consists of a bathhouse, a general swimming pool, and an infilled diving pool. The park is operated by the New York City Department of Parks and Recreation, also known as NYC Parks.

The construction of the park was funded by Betsy Head, a rich Briton who died in 1907. Plans for Betsy Head Park were completed in 1914 by Henry Beaumont Herts, and the park opened on September 30, 1915, with a bathhouse and a pool complex. The current Art Moderne style pool was built by Aymar Embury II and John Matthews Hatton during a Works Progress Administration project in 1935–1936. The bathhouse was not originally set to be renovated, unlike at other city parks with large pools, but it was rebuilt following a 1937 fire. The park's facilities were renovated from 1979 to 1983 and again in the late 2010s. The Betsy Head Play Center was designated as a landmark by the New York City Landmarks Preservation Commission in 2008.

== Recreation fields ==
Betsy Head Park is in two non-contiguous plots of unequal size, diagonally across the intersection of Dumont Avenue and Thomas S. Boyland Street. The park's recreational facilities include three baseball fields, two football fields, eight tennis courts, and six basketball courts. The football fields and four of the basketball courts overlap with the baseball fields and cannot be utilized when the baseball field is in use.

The larger plot, at the southwestern corner of Dumont Avenue and Thomas S. Boyland Street, measures 8.262 acres (33,440 m^{2}) and is bounded by Thomas S. Boyland Street to the east, Dumont Avenue to the north, Livonia Avenue to the south, and Strauss Street to the west. The plot measures 500 feet (150 m) along the western and eastern boundaries and 720 feet (220 m) on the northern and southern boundaries. It occupies three typical city blocks. Before 2021, the western two-thirds of the larger plot contained two baseball fields, an overlapping football field, and eight handball courts and one basketball court on the southern border of the plot. In 2021, four of the handball courts were replaced with a full basketball court, and two handball courts were built in another part of the plot. A four-lane running track and a synthetic turf field were also added during the 2021 renovation, within what was previously the baseball and football field.

A smaller plot exists at the northeastern corner of Dumont Avenue and Thomas S. Boyland Street. This plot, measuring 2.293 acres (0.928 ha), is bounded by Blake Avenue to the north, Bristol Street to the east, Dumont Avenue to the south, and Thomas S. Boyland Street to the west. The plot measures 500 feet (150 m) along the western and eastern boundaries and 200 feet (61 m) on the northern and southern boundaries. It occupies one typical city block. Before 2021, this section of the park contained another baseball field with overlapping football field and four overlapping basketball courts; one non-overlapping basketball court; and four tennis courts. One early feature in the smaller plot was a farmhouse and rest station with a "model kitchen", which in turn was adjacent to a small urban farm with 500 plots for schoolchildren to tend. During the 2021 renovation, a skate park, parkour course, and event area was added.

== Betsy Head Play Center ==
=== Original facilities ===
The original facilities were modeled after Armour Square Park in Chicago. The western two-thirds of Betsy Head Park's larger southwestern section was originally designed with a 15,000-to-20,000-capacity stadium containing a running track. A two-story field house, measuring 25 by 100 feet (7.6 by 30.5 m), was just east of the stadium. The field house contained restroom facilities on the ground floor, and 25 club-rooms and 25 lockers on the second floor, as well as space for special events. Gymnasiums for men and women were to the north and south of the field house, each with numerous indoor recreation facilities for basketball, handball, tennis, and other sports.

The eastern third of the park's southwestern section contained a swimming pool and bathhouse. The original swimming pool was described as being 150 by 60 feet (46 by 18 m) with the long edge being parallel to the eastern boundary of the park's larger plot. The original bath building was composed of two portions, one wing each to the north and south, just east of the swimming pool. The bathhouse could accommodate 400 people per hour or 4,000 per day, and a boiler room and towel room was in the basement.

=== Current modernist design ===
The structure had to be adaptable to a multiplicity of uses: hence the locker rooms can become basketball courts in winter; the roof is a stadium for viewing water pageants held in the pool. [...] Above all, the building is intended for enjoyable use.

— Ely Jacques Kahn, Architectural Record, September 1941

The replacement bathhouse was designed in the Art Moderne style, similar to the Astoria Play Center, in Astoria, Queens. The building was upheld by the architect Ely Jacques Kahn as being "above all...intended for enjoyable use", while parks commissioner Robert Moses called its plans "better than that adopted in any of the existing pools". On the other hand, Embury, known to be a traditionalist in his designs, criticized the style. He once said of modernist architects: "They leave off all ornamentation because, they say, the ornaments do not aid the structure to do its job." Architectural historian Robert A. M. Stern said the Betsy Head Play Center was "perhaps the most inventive and most overtly Modernist structure" of the WPA bathhouses erected by the New York City government.

Unlike its counterparts around the city, the Betsy Head Play Center never contained a wading pool. It included a main swimming pool, as well as a diving pool that was later filled in.

==== Bathhouse ====
The bathhouse is in Betsy Head Park's southwestern section, with its main entrance along Thomas S. Boyland Street to the east. The eastern facade consists mostly of glass-bricked walls set into a bonded brick wall, which correspond to the walls of the locker rooms inside. Stone coping is at the bottom and top of the facade, and a metal railing is above the stone coping at the top, serving as the handrail for the rooftop deck. The facade was built with materials that could not be easily stolen. The central section of the facade contains the building's main entrance, which is flanked by a curving glass brick wall on either side, and is accessed by a flight of four steps and a wheelchair ramp on the northern side of the steps. The western facade, adjacent to the pool, is similar to the eastern facade, but has two steps up from the pool area to the lobby. The curving glass wall on the northern side of the western facade was replaced for the installation of an elevator, and a wheelchair ramp extends along the southern half of the western facade.

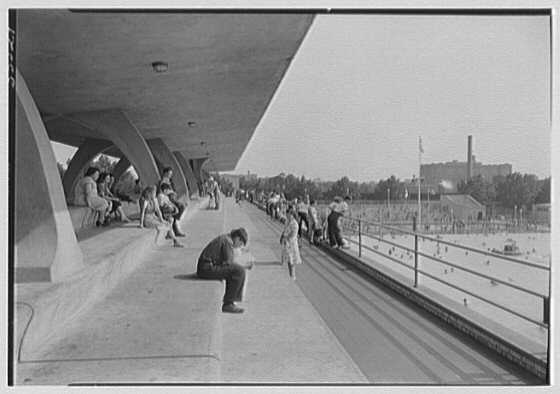
Bleachers on the roof of the bathhouse

The lobby is in the central section of the bathhouse, separating the men's and women's locker rooms to the north and south, respectively. There are no walls or doorways to the west or east, allowing the facade to be lit naturally. Rather, roll-down metal gates are across the western and eastern entrances. The lobby contains a bluestone-tiled floor, while the white-plaster ceiling contains stepped concentric squares, with the innermost squares being slightly higher. A circular brick column rises through the center of the lobby. A ticket booth was in the lobby, but is no longer operational, as the pool and bathhouse are free to use. There are plaster-and-marble walls separating the lobby from each locker room and various smaller rooms such as the office area to the south and the first-aid room to the north. Above the doorways to each room are Art Deco-style letters indicating the room's purpose, such as the words "MEN" and "WOMEN" above the respective genders' locker rooms. There are metal double-doors leading to each of the locker room areas.

The locker rooms contained several hundred lockers each and are outfitted with concrete floors and brick-with-terracotta walls. The locker rooms are designed with waterproof stepped ceilings similar to the lobby, and as a result, the acoustic quality of the locker rooms is weak. During winters, each locker room could be converted to gym facilities for each gender. The identical shower rooms, at the opposite end of the locker rooms, also contain entrances from the pool area to the west. The pool entrances are recessed into the building, and are flanked by curved walls with cinder blocks that are designed similarly to the original glass blocks. The letters "MEN" and "WOMEN" are also above these entrances.

Above the building is a rooftop observation deck, accessed by stairs to the south and north of the bathhouse. The deck was shaded by a canopy supported by eight metal-clad parabolic arches, and there were concrete bleachers underneath the canopy. The roof is closed to the public.

==== Pool ====
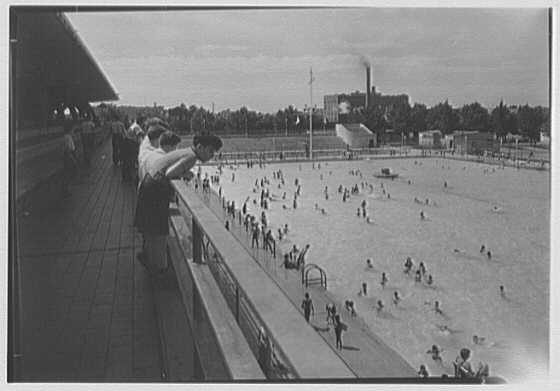
Overview of the pool from the roof

The pool area is west of the bathhouse, taking up much of the block between Livonia Avenue to the south and Dumont Avenue to the north. The main pool is rectangular, measuring 330 by 165 feet (101 by 50 m) with the longer axis running north–south, and has a depth of 4.25 feet (1.30 m). A cement deck surrounds the pool and is encircled by a chain link fence. Two small islands are in the center of the pool and contain triangular-capped filtration systems. Until the pool was renovated in the early 1980s, these islands contained fountains.

The diving pool was south of the main pool. After it was infilled in 2005–2006, the space has contained a volleyball court. A storage area used by NYC Parks is on the east side of the pool area.

Entrance to pool at Betsy Head park in fall 2026

Concrete bleachers, along with a filter house, were on the southern side of the pool area adjacent to the volleyball court. The concrete bleachers were built with the original bathhouse in 1917 and were surrounded by a wall made of Flemish bond brickwork. The space underneath the bleachers contained five circular windows facing toward Livonia Avenue to the south. The bleacher was replaced with a new entrance in 2021. A two-story brick filter house is to the west and contains a metal doorway and short flight of steps that leads to Livonia Avenue. The former bleachers and filter house area are surrounded by a chain link fence.

== History ==
=== Early history ===
In the late 19th and early 20th centuries, Brownsville was a densely populated Jewish neighborhood. An estimated 25,000 people lived in Brownsville by 1900, many of whom lived in severely overcrowded tenements. The neighborhood had little open space, and a local group, the Hebrew Educational Society, recommended the establishment of a public park within Brownsville. Furthermore, Brooklyn in general had very few playgrounds: by the time Betsy Head Park was approved in 1913, there were only eight playgrounds in Brooklyn.

Betsy Head, a rich Briton, died in 1907. Head's $365,000 estate (equivalent to $12,612,000 in 2025) was divided almost equally between facilities for New York City parks and various city charities; Head's daughter received only $5 (equivalent to $173 in 2025), as she disliked that her daughter had married a foreman. As part of Head's will, $190,000 (equivalent to $6,565,000 in 2025) was allocated to New York City park facilities. The sum allocated to Betsy Head Park in Brooklyn was originally allocated for a park of the same name at Corlears Hook on the Lower East Side. The money was never used for this purpose, so in early 1913 some Brownsville residents asked the New York City Comptroller, William A. Prendergast, for the use of the funds for their own park. This caused controversy, as the land under the proposed park would be funded by a tax paid by landowners in the surrounding community, some of whom opposed paying said tax. In July 1913, the city approved the acquisition of the parkland. The land under the Betsy Head Playground was purchased for $240,000 (equivalent to $7,818,000 in 2025) and paid-for by Brownsville landowners living within 1 mile (1.6 km) of the site. The playground's facilities were funded by the estate of Betsy Head.

Plans for Betsy Head Park were completed in May 1914 by Henry Beaumont Herts, who proposed to include numerous facilities in each section of the park. The larger section would be composed of wading and swimming pools, a bathhouse, a running track, and tennis courts. The smaller section would comprise an administration building, a rest pavilion, a playground, and a garden for schoolchildren. This would help make Betsy Head Park into "one of the finest in the world". Betsy Head Park opened on September 30, 1915. The park contained a stadium with a running track, and a two-story field house with capacity for 4,000 people per day. As the only play area in the neighborhood, it was "overcrowded" upon opening. In the 1915 Panama–Pacific International Exposition, Betsy Head Park's design received first prize in the New York City Parks portion of the competition.

=== Works Progress Administration renovation ===
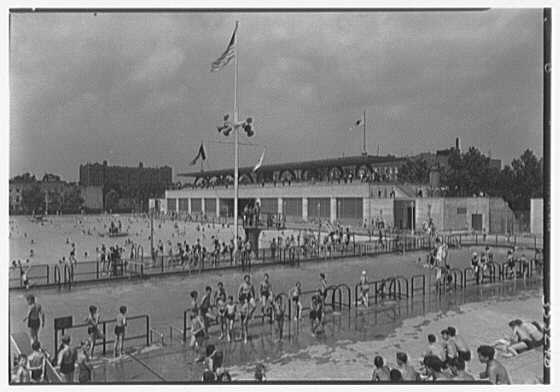
Pool area, seen in 1939

In 1934, mayor Fiorello H. La Guardia nominated Robert Moses to become commissioner of a unified New York City Department of Parks and Recreation. At the time, the United States was experiencing the Great Depression; immediately after La Guardia won the 1933 election, Moses began to write "a plan for putting 80,000 men to work on 1,700 relief projects". By the time he was in office, several hundred such projects were underway across the city.

Moses was especially interested in creating new pools and other bathing facilities, such as those in Jacob Riis Park, Jones Beach, and Orchard Beach. He devised a list of 23 pools around the city, including one at Betsy Head Park. The pools would be built using funds from the Works Progress Administration (WPA), a federal agency created as part of the New Deal to combat the Depression's negative effects. Eleven of these pools were to be designed concurrently and open in 1936. Moses, along with the architects Aymar Embury II and Gilmore David Clarke, created a common design for these proposed aquatic centers. Each location was to have distinct pools for diving, swimming, and wading; bleachers and viewing areas; and bathhouses with locker rooms that could be used as gymnasiums. The pools were to have several common features, such as a minimum 55-yard (50 m) length, underwater lighting, heating, and filtration, all constructed using inexpensive materials. To fit the requirement for efficiency and low-cost construction, each building would be built using elements of the Streamline Moderne and Classical architectural styles. The buildings would also be near "comfort stations", additional playgrounds, and spruced-up landscapes.

Construction for some of the 11 pools began in October 1934. Even though there was already a pool at Betsy Head Park, Moses described its existing pool facilities as "an antiquated tank" that contained no filtration facilities; he proposed to refurbish it entirely as part of the WPA initiative. The existing field house largely remained intact, except for some modifications to make way for an enlarged pool. The field house's lockers were replaced by baskets, and its interior was expanded so that 4,660 bathers per day could use the facilities, rather than 4,000. By mid-1936, ten of the eleven WPA-funded pools were completed and were being opened at a rate of one per week. Except for the Betsy Head Pool, each opening featured elaborate performances attended by La Guardia. Betsy Head Park's pool was the ninth to open citywide. (Note: The pools opened in the following chronological order: Hamilton Fish Park, Thomas Jefferson Park, Astoria Park, Tompkinsville Pool, Highbridge Park, Sunset Park, Crotona Park, McCarren Park, Betsy Head Park, Colonial Park, and Red Hook Park.) On August 7, 1936, Betsy Head Park's pool area opened without any ceremony or the mayor in attendance; over eight hundred children spread the news of the opening by word of mouth. The opening was arranged at the last minute, and the diving and wading pools were not yet complete.

In September 1936, work started on converting the main pool to winter use, with workers temporarily draining the pool and adding basketball, handball, shuffleboard, tennis, and volleyball facilities. The original bathhouse was destroyed by fire on August 17, 1937, and the pool was closed for the rest of the season. Park commissioner Moses's letter to La Guardia, addressed three days later, advocated for the total replacement of the bathhouse. The pool area was reopened for the 1938 season, with a temporary one-story structure that housed the showers. The current one-story bathhouse was opened on May 27, 1939. By 1941, the other athletic facilities in the larger southwestern portion of the park were nearly complete.

A new indoor playground in Betsy Head Park, to serve as a community recreation center during the winter, was announced in May 1948 and was supposed to begin the next year. However, by mid-1949 construction still had not started. A running track was opened at Betsy Head Park in 1952, one of eighteen opened citywide. The rest of the indoor Betsy Head Recreation Center was removed from the NYC Parks budget, and the money was instead allocated to the Brownsville Boys Club, which the city acquired in 1954. In the mid-20th century, Brownsville became a mostly African American neighborhood, and Betsy Head Park's patrons came to include boxer Riddick Bowe, who lived in Brownsville. Despite segregation being present at comparable facilities at the time, African American and white children and adults used the facilities without any conflict.

=== Decline and renovations ===
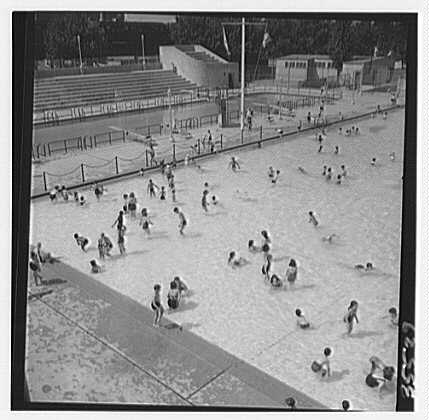
View of the main pool

Over the years, multiple children and young adults have drowned at Betsy Head Pool. For instance, a 7-year-old boy drowned in 1947, and a 4-year-old boy also drowned in 1988. A third child, a 5-year-old girl drowned in the pool in 1995, despite the presence of ten lifeguards. The drowning of the 5-year-old girl resulted in greater scrutiny, especially due to the lack of lifeguards around the pool, and resulted in the implementation of more stringent rules the following season, wherein kids under a certain height had to be accompanied by guardians. In 1999, an 18-year-old woman also drowned in the pool.

By the 1970s, Betsy Head Park and other city parks were in poor condition following the 1975 New York City fiscal crisis, and were widely seen as being unsafe. NYC Parks commenced a project to restore the pools in several parks in 1977, including at Betsy Head Park. In 1979, the agency set aside an estimated $5.2 million for the restoration of Betsy Head Park. The renovation of Betsy Head Park was approved in January 1981, despite a shortage of employees in general across the NYC Parks system. The diving and swimming pools were rebuilt, the bathhouse was retrofitted with handicapped-accessible locker rooms, and the other recreational facilities in Betsy Head Park were rebuilt. The reconstructed park reopened on June 28, 1983.

NYC Parks continued to face financial shortfalls in the coming years, and the pools retained a reputation for high crime. For the summer of 1991, mayor David Dinkins had planned to close all 32 outdoor pools in the city, a decision that was only reversed after a $2 million donation from a trust created upon the death of real estate developer Sol Goldman and $1.8 million from other sources. To prevent nighttime trespassing, NYC Parks added a heavy steel fence in 1993, which was attached to the existing chain-link fence around the pool. Additionally, in the 1990s, a practice called "whirlpooling" became common in New York City pools such as Betsy Head Park, in which women would be inappropriately fondled by teenage boys. By the beginning of the 21st century, crimes such as sexual assaults had decreased in parks citywide due to increased security. In 2008, the New York City Landmarks Preservation Commission designated the Betsy Head Play Center a landmark, making it the first individual landmark in Brownsville. The commission had previously considered the pool for landmark status in 1990, along with the other ten WPA pools in the city.

Prototype designs for the construction of Betsy Head Playground were unveiled in 2009. The Rockwell Group was selected to design the play area. In early 2016, the playground inside the park was renovated for $5.05 million, with an "Imagination Playground" surrounded by a 6-foot-tall (1.8 m) wooden pathway. The new play area, which features movable foam play blocks, is based on the group's Burling Slip playground in Lower Manhattan. Later that year, $30 million was allocated for further improvements to the park's recreational facilities as part of the city's Anchor Parks program. Work on these improvements commenced in 2019. The first phase of the renovation, consisting of renovations to the playground and adjacent recreational areas, was finished in June 2020 for $7 million. The second phase, composed of further recreational additions, was completed in April 2021 for $23 million, though some improvements were not completed until early 2022.

== See also ==
- List of New York City Designated Landmarks in Brooklyn
