= Lyons Pool Recreation Center =

Park facility in Staten Island, New York

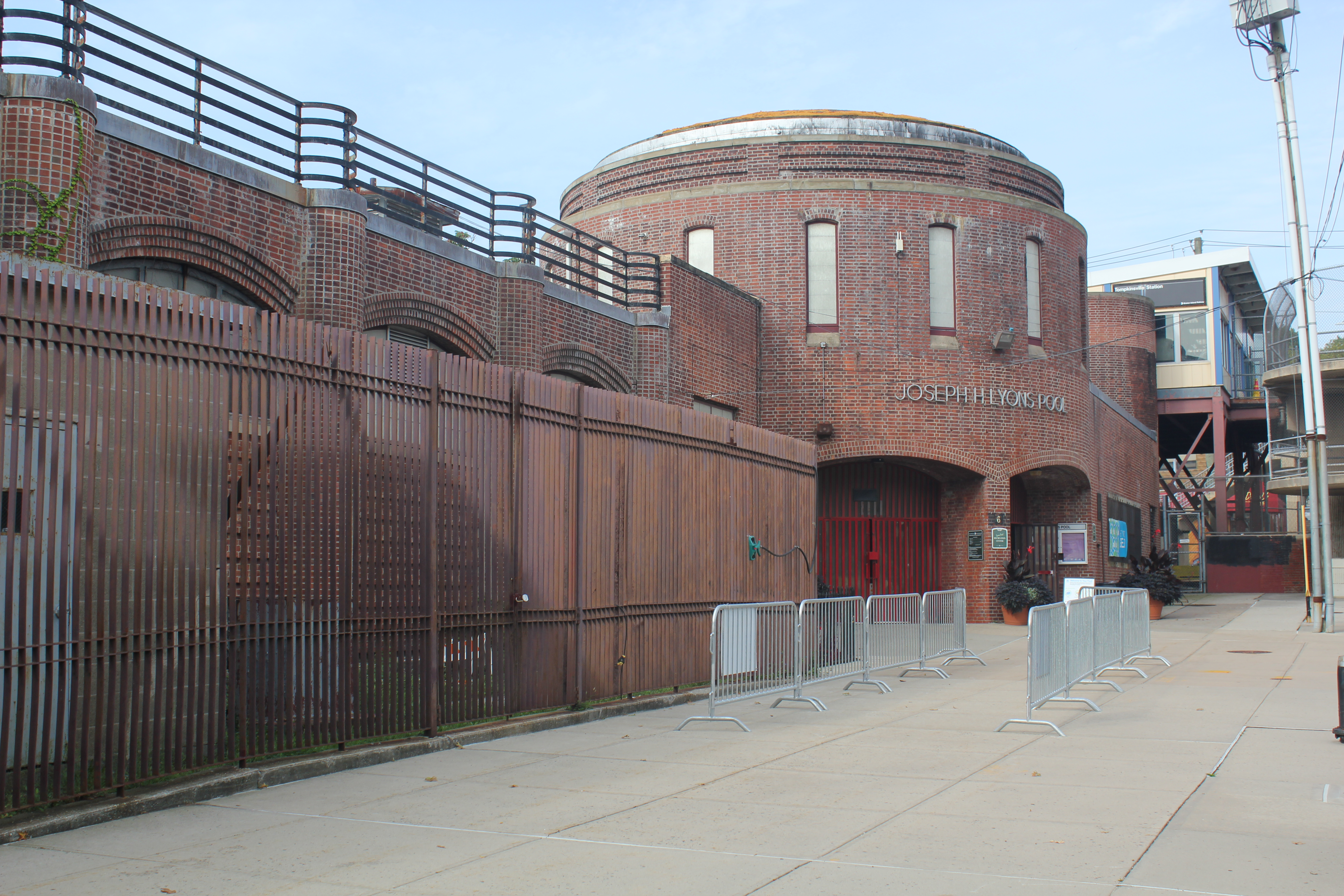
- The north wall of the recreation center
- Interactive map of Lyons Pool Recreation Center
- Type: Swimming pool and recreation center
- Location: Intersection of Victory Boulevard and Murray Hulbert Avenue; Tompkinsville, Staten Island, New York, U.S.
- Coordinates: 40°38′14″N 74°04′27″W
- Area: 3.2 acres (1.3 ha)
- Created: 1936
- Operator: NYC Parks
- Public transit: Bus: S46, S48, S51, S61, S62, S66, S74, S76, S78, S81, S84, S86, S91, S92, S96, S98; Staten Island Railway: Tompkinsville station
- Website: Official website

New York City Landmark
- Designated: September 16, 2008
- Reference no.: 2234
- Designated entity: Pools and recreation center facade

New York City Landmark
- Designated: September 16, 2008
- Reference no.: 2235
- Designated entity: Recreation center interior

The Lyons Pool Recreation Center (also known as the Joseph H. Lyons Pool and Tompkinsville Pool) is a 3.2-acre (1.3 ha) public swimming pool complex in the Tompkinsville neighborhood of Staten Island in New York City. The complex is situated on the island's North Shore, next to New York Harbor, and consists of a general swimming pool and two smaller pools for diving and wading. The pool complex is served by a one-story brick bathhouse designed in the Art Moderne style, which runs along the pool in an L shape. The bathhouse consists of a northern wing for the women's shower and locker rooms, a western wing for the men's shower and locker rooms, and a connecting rotunda with a main lobby. The pool and recreation center are maintained by the New York City Department of Parks and Recreation (NYC Parks).

The pool and bathhouse, along with the adjacent George Cromwell Center, were designed by Joseph L. Hautman as part of a Works Progress Administration (WPA) project in 1935–1936. Opened on July 7, 1936, the Lyons Pool was the only WPA-era pool built on Staten Island. Following a series of minor upgrades over the years, the Lyons Pool was extensively renovated between 1984 and 1986. The complex, including the interior of the bathhouse's lobby, was designated as a city landmark by the New York City Landmarks Preservation Commission in 2008. After the neighboring George Cromwell Center was demolished in 2013, plans for a new recreation center above the pool's parking lot were announced in 2017. The new facility, known as the Mary Cali Dalton Recreation Center, is under construction as of 2025.

== Description ==
The Lyons Pool Recreation Center is in the Tompkinsville neighborhood of Staten Island in New York City. The complex is on the island's North Shore next to New York Harbor. It occupies a site bounded by Murray Hulbert Avenue to the east and southeast, Hannah Street to the south, a dead-end section of Victory Boulevard to the north, and the Staten Island Railway (SIR) to the west. A footbridge crosses the SIR line, connecting the pool complex's entrance with the main section of Victory Boulevard to the west. Because the site is on reclaimed land, the pool complex has sump pumps to prevent seawater from entering the pool area.

The facility is composed of three separate pools and covers approximately 3.2 acres (1.3 ha); of this, the bathhouse and pools cover 2.56 acres (1.04 ha). The pool complex is one of eleven in New York City built in the 1930s by the Works Progress Administration (WPA), a federal agency created to combat the Depression's negative effects as part of the New Deal. Of these eleven pools, only two were not associated with an existing park; Joseph H. Lyons Pool was one of them. It was also the largest public pool on Staten Island.

=== Bathhouse ===
The bathhouse is a one-story structure, clad almost entirely in red brick, extending in an "L" shape along the western and northern sides of the site. The north wing contains the women's showers and women's locker rooms, while the west wing contains the men's showers, men's locker rooms, and the boiler and plant house. There is a one-and-a-half-story rotunda at the northwestern corner of the bathhouse, along with a smokestack at the middle of the bathhouse's western elevation. The rotunda includes a lobby that provides access to the lockers and showers in each wing.

==== North wing ====
The north wing's northern elevation sits above a concrete water table and is divided vertically into sixteen bays, which are grouped in three sections. The easternmost section is two bays wide and contains a curved corner; within the easternmost section, the bricks are laid in horizontal courses, which are variously recessed or flush with the rest of the facade. Each bay of the eastern section is flanked by round columns and, from bottom to top, consists of a recessed brick wall, a concrete window sill, a hopper window, and an aluminum window with a grille. This section is topped by a bluestone parapet. The central section is eight bays wide and is recessed behind a concrete-and-gravel areaway with mechanical equipment. Each bay of the central section has a red brick wall segment topped by segmentally arched openings with windows or ventilation louvers. The bays in the central section are separated by protruding round columns, and there is a sheet-metal coping and a railing above the facade. The westernmost six bays consist of the protruding rotunda (see Lyons Pool Recreation Center § Rotunda), which is flanked by flat segments of wall.

The eastern elevation is two bays wide and leads to a raised, enclosed concrete plaza at the same level as the pool deck. The plaza is surrounded by planting beds to the east and north; it has a steep ramp descending north to Victory Boulevard, along with metal gates with brick cheek walls, or side walls, leading south to the pool. The facade itself is divided vertically into two bays and contains a curved corner at either end. The lower half of the facade is clad in brick and has two metal doors topped by a cast-concrete canopy. In the upper half, there are hopper windows and recessed tripartite windows above each of the doors. Each bay is separated by rounded brick columns. At the southeast corner is a curved wall that surrounds a staircase to the roof, with a gate blocking off access to the staircase.

The southern elevation is ten bays wide. In the westernmost bay is a stoop leading to the pool office and another stair from the pool office to the roof deck (blocked off by a metal gate). The westernmost bay has a door and some windows, flanked by round columns, and is illuminated by a lamp. The other nine bays consists of a red brick wall segment topped by segmentally arched openings with hopper windows. The bays are separated by protruding round columns, and there is a sheet-metal coping and a railing above the facade. In two of the bays, the red-brick wall segments beneath the windows contain metal doors. Additionally, there is a protruding 6-foot-tall (1.8 m) brick wall concealing the women's locker room entrance. Some signage is stenciled onto the facade.

==== Rotunda ====
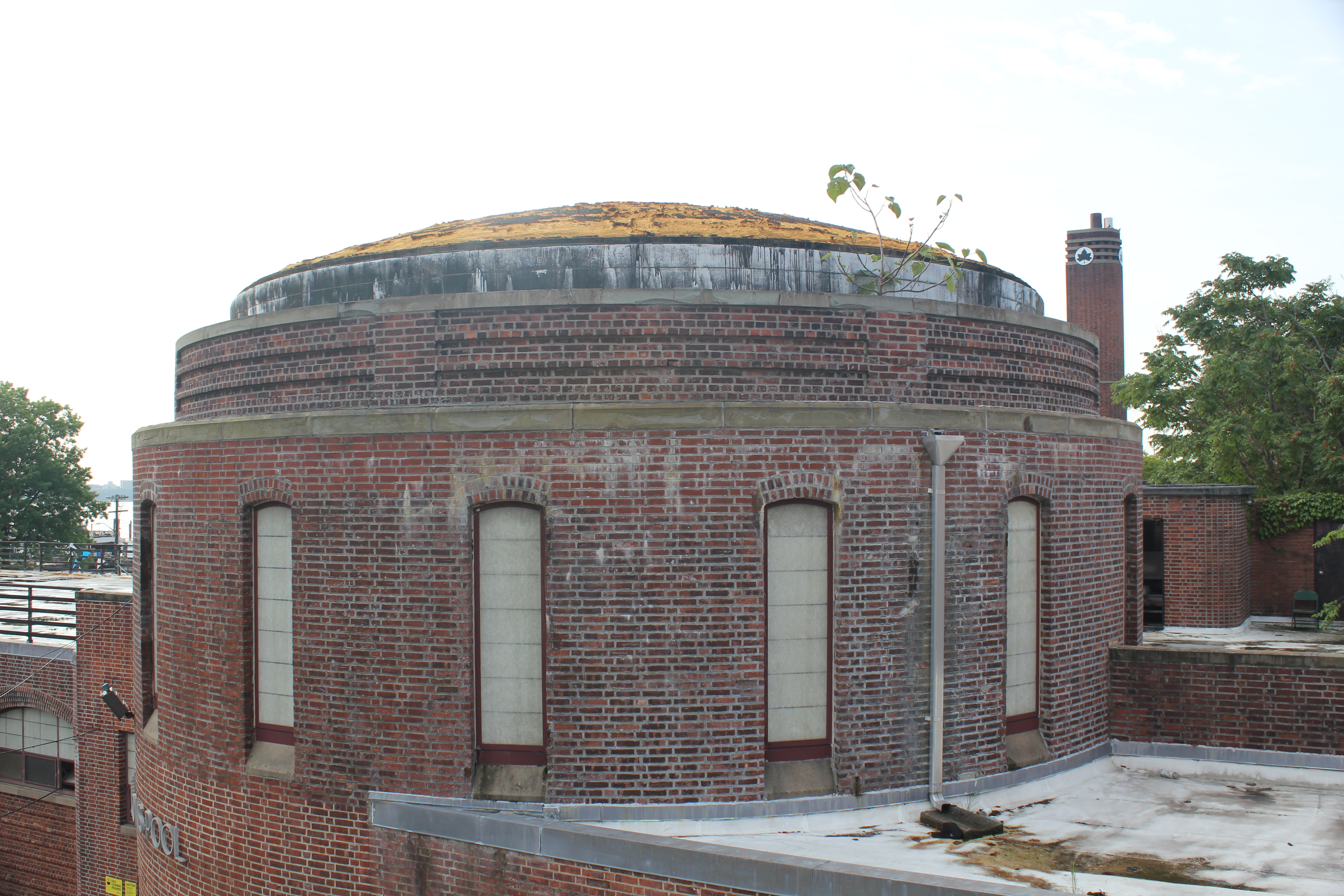
Top of the rotunda

The rotunda protrudes from the north wing. The rotunda's exterior contains two segmental arches, with recessed doors flanked by sidelights and topped by transom windows. These doors lead to the building's lobby, which in turn leads to the locker rooms, showers, and pool. There is a metal sign above the doors, with the name "Joseph H. Lyons Pool", as well as lights and an alarm box on the facade. Above the doorways is an upper clerestory level with tall, narrow segmentally arched openings; these contain aluminum sash windows. A coping made of bluestone is placed atop the upper clerestory level, as well as above the rotunda's drum. To the west of this rotunda is a set of windows with grilles above them, as well as a louvered doorway. The northwest corner of the rotunda contains a curved brick wall, which conceals a concrete stairway that, until the 1980s, was connected to a footbridge above the Staten Island Railway's Tompkinsville station.

The interior of the rotunda is a circular space with ticket counters, a package room, and an alcove with telephones. Hallways lead south to the men's lockers and showers in the western wing and east to the women's lockers and showers in the north wing. The rotunda itself contains a terrazzo floor with a starburst pattern. The lower section of the wall is made of brick that is laid in alternating courses of headers and stretchers. This is topped by a frieze of cast concrete, followed by smooth clerestory walls with pairs of narrow windows. Above the entire lobby is a domed ceiling. Construction drawings indicate that the ceiling may have once contained a mural, and that the frieze and clerestory walls may have contained stenciled decorations. By the 21st century, the frieze, clerestory walls, and ceiling were all painted in an off-white color. There are also various signs, doors, and louvers placed on the rotunda's perimeter wall, as well as spotlights on the walls and ceiling. Turnstiles are placed on the terrazzo floors, though there is no longer a charge to use the building in the 21st century.

==== West wing ====
The west wing's western elevation is divided vertically into twenty bays. The northernmost part of the facade protrudes slightly next to the SIR line, concealing the stairway next to the rotunda. Immediately to the south is a narrow window facing south (where the northernmost section steps back) and three bays of rectangular windows facing west. This is followed by a second section with eight bays, which illuminate the men's lockers and shower rooms; the northernmost of these bays has a pair of windows, while the remaining seven bays have segmentally arched windows separated by round columns. This section has bluestone coping and a metal railing. The third section is three bays wide and is slightly taller than the other sections, with either recessed louvers or blind openings separated by round columns. The fourth, southernmost section has six bays that illuminate the filter room. This section lacks windows and instead features segmentally arched blind openings, some ventilation openings, a bluestone coping, and a metal roof rail.

The southern elevation is mostly unornamented and faces south toward a parking lot. The roofline of this elevation steps down to the east because there is a staircase behind the wall. At the center of the southern elevation are two windows, one of which has a grille. The facade is topped by bluestone coping and a steel railing.

The eastern elevation is divided into two sections by a smokestack at the center of the facade. In the southern half of this elevation, the southernmost bay leads to the stair on the southern elevation. Between this stair and the smokestack are six bays, with red-brick wall segments and segmentally arched windows separated by round columns; two of these bays have doors, and one bay has a louver. The facade is topped by bluestone coping and a steel railing. At the center of the facade, a semicircular smokestack protrudes from a concave niche and tapers as it rises. The top of the smokestack is ornamented with the logo of New York City Department of Parks and Recreation (NYC Parks) and horizontal concrete bands. The northern half of the eastern elevation is eight bays wide and similar in design to the southern half. In two of the bays, the red-brick wall segments beneath the windows contain metal doors. Additionally, there is a protruding brick wall concealing the men's locker room entrance. Some signage is stenciled onto the facade.

==== Roof deck ====
Most of the bathhouse's roof, except the section above the rotunda, is occupied by a deck that was originally used as a sunbathing or observation deck. The deck is enclosed by brick parapets and metal railings and was formerly accessible by three staircases. The roof deck was originally made of split brick but was later covered with asphalt. The north wing's has two mechanical dormers that contain fan rooms, as well as a staircase leading to the overpass above the SIR line. Above the office, at the northwest corner of the building, is an unused rectangular concession stand with a brick facade and rounded corners. The west wing's roof is composed of two shorter sections to the north and south, both of which have stairs leading up to the boiler room's tall roof in the center. There is a mechanical dormer with a fan room on the northernmost section of the west wing's roof, while there are no structures on the southernmost section's roof.

=== Pools ===
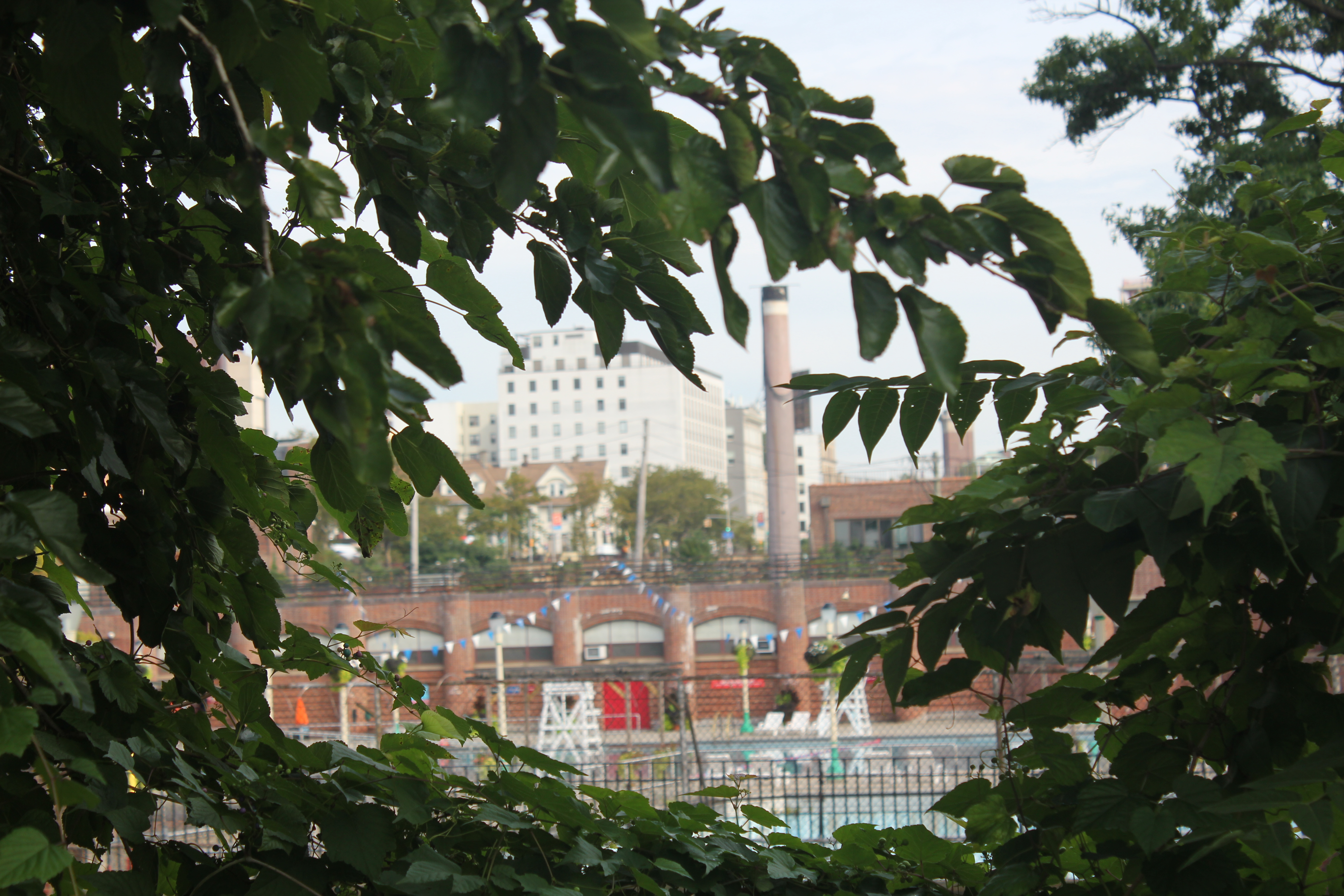
View of the pool in the distance. The trees on the pool's perimeter are in the foreground.

The pool area occupies much of the site. Along the southern and eastern boundaries of the site is a 4-foot-high (1.2 m) retaining wall with brick facing and stone coping; the wall is topped by chain-link fencing. The pool deck is near the top of the retaining wall and is surrounded by an inner wall composed of a brick cheek wall, cast iron fence, and brick piers. Oak trees are planted in between the retaining wall and the inner wall. The deck was originally illuminated by 25 lamps, many of which are still intact. There are also some Belgian block planting areas with oak trees; wooden benches upon concrete pedestals; a flagpole near the diving pool to the south; and some cast-concrete drinking fountains. Signs are painted onto the pool deck. The complex was intended to accommodate up to 2,800 swimmers simultaneously; a 1988 article from the Staten Island Advance cited the pools as having a capacity of 1,200 swimmers.

The Lyons Pool complex is divided into three pools for lap-swimming, diving, and wading. The main pool occupies the northern half of the site. It measures 100 by 165 feet (30 by 50 m) across and is oriented on a west–east axis. When it was rebuilt in the 1980s, a new gutter and ladders, concrete ramp, and pipe railing were added, and the original lights were removed; the modern pool is divided into 14 lanes. To the south of the main pool were formerly diving and wading pools, both measuring 68 by 100 feet (21 by 30 m). The diving pool had a diving board, diving platform, and pipe railing designed in the Art Moderne style, as well as stainless-steel gutters added in the 1980s. The wading pool originally sloped down to a depth of 2.5 feet (0.76 m) but was made even shallower after the 1980s. The site of the wading pool is surrounded by a chain link fence, with a gate to the west; it contains 12 sprinklers at its perimeter and two sprinklers at its center.

Originally, the complex had 200-horsepower (150 kW) diesel pumps that recirculated the pools' water. The water in the pools was recycled every 5–8 hours, and five filters cleaned 2,000 U.S. gallons (7,600 L) of water every minute. The diesel pumps were replaced with electric pumps in 1956. The Staten Island Advance wrote in 1960 that three NYC Parks staffers were employed for the sole purpose of maintaining the Lyons Pool's filters, and that at least one person was monitoring the filters at any given time. At the time, the pool area had four pumps, each of which could recirculate 1,000 U.S. gallons (3,800 L) a minute, as well as six charcoal filters. In the 1980s, the coal filters were removed, and nine sand-filled steel filters were installed.

=== Associated structures ===
As of 2024, a new recreation facility, the Mary Cali Dalton Recreation Center, is being developed on top of the Lyons Pool's parking lot. The new facility is to cover 45,000 square feet (4,200 m^{2}) and span three stories. The Dalton Recreation Center's main level is planned to have a lobby, gymnasium, and locker rooms, while the upper story would include rooms for cardio training, strength training, teenagers' programming, and dance. The Dalton Recreation Center replaces the George Cromwell Center directly to the east, which opened in 1935 and was built atop the former Pier 6. The Cromwell Center had a 37,000-square-foot (3,400 m^{2}) ballroom; an auditorium that could be divided into basketball, tennis, and shuffleboard courts; and office space.

== History ==
Floating outdoor swimming pools have existed on New York City's rivers since 1870, and the city's first free public bathhouse opened in 1891. Although the floating outdoor pools had been supplanted by the bathhouses by the early 20th century, demand for outdoor pools persisted. The city had only two outdoor pools in 1934—at Faber Park and Betsy Head Park. The borough of Staten Island had no public pools at all until the Faber Park pool opened in 1932.

=== Works Progress Administration ===
In 1934, Robert Moses was nominated by Mayor Fiorello H. La Guardia to become commissioner of a unified New York City Department of Parks and Recreation. At the time, the United States was experiencing the Great Depression; immediately after La Guardia won the 1933 election, Moses began to write "a plan for putting 80,000 men to work on 1,700 relief projects". By the time he was in office, several hundred projects were underway across the city.

Moses was especially interested in creating new pools and other bathing facilities, such as those in Jacob Riis Park, Jones Beach, and Orchard Beach. He devised a list of 23 pools around the city, including a brand-new pool in Tompkinsville, Staten Island. The pools would be built using funds from the WPA. Eleven of these pools were to be designed concurrently and open in 1936. Moses, along with the architects Aymar Embury II and Gilmore David Clarke, created a common design for each of the 11 proposed aquatic centers. Each location was to have distinct pools for diving, swimming, and wading; bleachers and viewing areas; and bathhouses with locker rooms that could be used as gymnasiums. The pools were to have several common features, such as a minimum 55-yard (50 m) length, underwater lighting, heating, and filtration, all constructed using inexpensive materials. To fit the requirement for efficiency and low-cost construction, each building would be built using elements of the Streamline Moderne and Classical architectural styles. The buildings would also be near "comfort stations", additional playgrounds, and spruced-up landscapes.

Moses had planned a single pool in Staten Island, which was originally scheduled to be built near New Brighton. The proposed pool was relocated to Tompkinsville after Joseph A. Palma recommended that site, which was next to the Staten Island Railway and the under-construction George Cromwell Center, the latter of which had opened in 1935. Construction for some of the 11 pools began in October 1934. Aymar Embury filed plans for the Tompkinsville Pool in March 1935, which called for a single-story bathhouse, a main swimming pool, and smaller wading and diving pools next to it. Workers had already begun constructing the pool. The U.S. government provided $809,428 for the Tompkinsville Park Pool in July 1935; at the time, eight of the pools were under construction simultaneously.

By mid-1936, ten of the eleven WPA-funded pools were completed and were being opened at a rate of one per week. Workers were putting finishing touches on the Tompkinsville Pool as late as July 4–5, 1936, over the Independence Day weekend. The Tompkinsville Pool officially opened on July 8, 1936, with 7,500 people attending the dedication ceremony. It was the fourth WPA pool in New York City to open, (Note: The pools opened in the following chronological order: Hamilton Fish Park, Thomas Jefferson Park, Astoria Park, Tompkinsville Pool, Highbridge Park, Sunset Park, Crotona Park, McCarren Park, Betsy Head Park, Colonial Park, and Red Hook Park.) as well as the only one in Staten Island.

=== 20th century ===
==== 1930s to 1950s ====
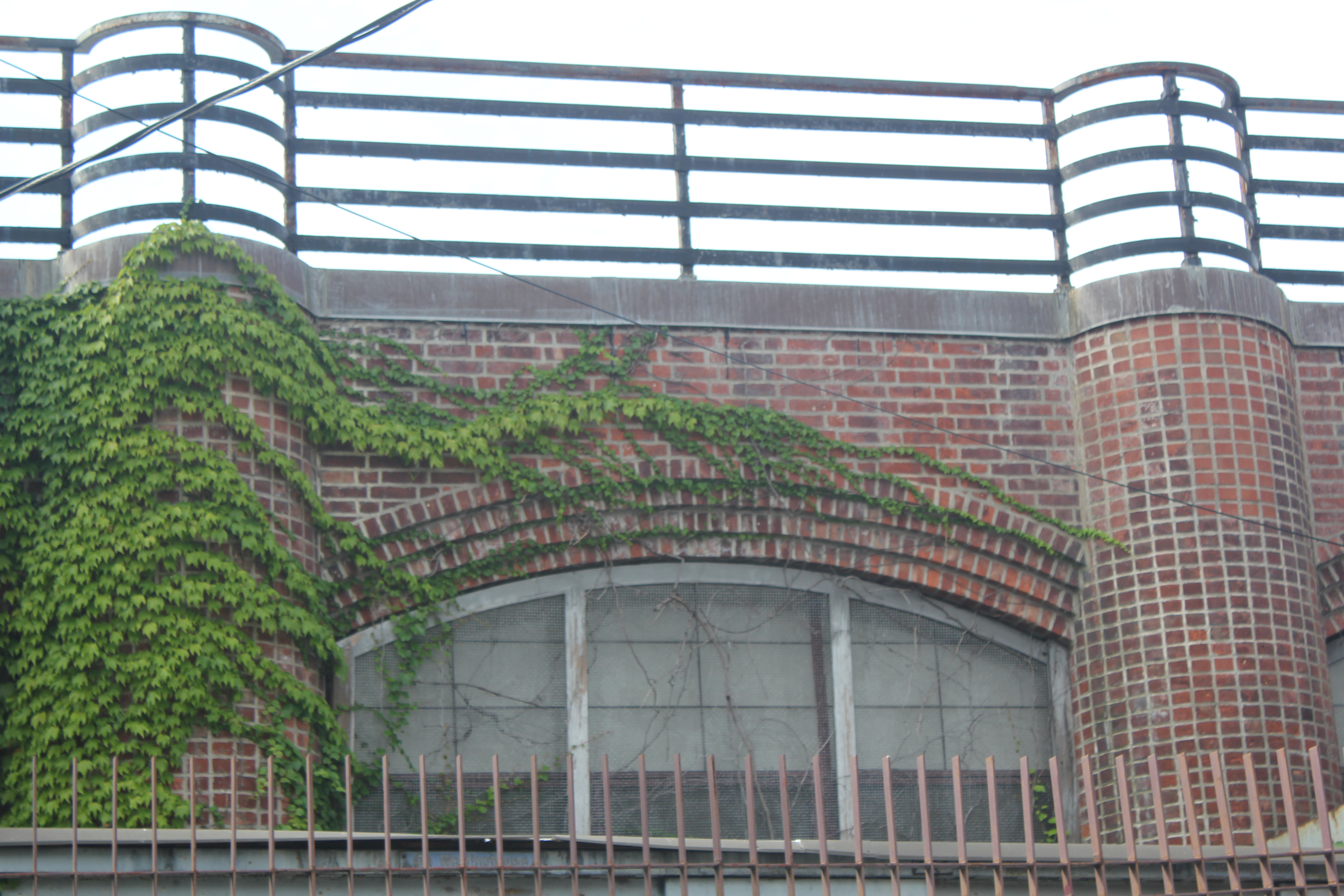
Detail of an archway on Victory Boulevard

In the Lyons Pool's first years of operation, children were the only visitors allowed to use the main pool on weekdays before 1 p.m.; furthermore, they were allowed to enter for free. Though the pool operated only during the summers, NYC Parks maintained the pool area throughout the year. Parks workers painted the pools, patched up holes, and inspected pool equipment such as diving boards and ladders. A NYC Parks employee regularly monitored the water in the pools, and the pumps were inspected and fixed during the off-season. Some visitors died in the pool over the years, including a seven-year-old girl in 1952.

In 1935, before the Tompkinsville Pool had even opened, the New York City Board of Aldermen had agreed to rename the pool after Joseph H. Lyons, a local World War I veteran who had died in 1934. The pool was formally rededicated in Lyons's honor in 1938, and a plaque honoring him was installed on the bathhouse's Victory Boulevard elevation, near the entrance. Alteration drawings were filed in 1944 for repairs to the facade. After the pool closed for the 1945 season, the bathhouse was repainted. Following requests from the Staten Island Legion, who observed that many visitors used the "Tompkinsville Pool" name instead of its official name, the city government passed a resolution in 1947 to install a plaque memorializing Lyons. Also during the 1940s, the pool area was drained during the off-season and used for sports such as volleyball, basketball, and ice skating; this seasonal conversion into a play area continued through the 1950s.

During the 1950s, to prevent overcrowding, NYC Parks continued to ban adults from using the pool area during weekday mornings, when the pool hosted swimming lessons. The pool also had an adult-swimming program during the weekend. The city government provided funds in 1950 for repairs to the pool complex's heating system. The local chapter of the Police Athletic League of New York City began hosting meetings at the pool complex that year. NYC Parks announced plans to replace the pool's diesel pump in 1956, citing high costs and environmental concerns. At the time, the pools at Astoria and McCarren parks were the only other public pools in the city still using diesel pumps. The Board of Estimate allocated $32,000 for the pump replacement. In 1959, NYC Parks announced that it would spend $100,000 to replace the pool deck (which had become severely degraded) and install new gutters. After the Board of Estimate allocated $134,000 for the deck and gutter replacement in 1960, Sloan & Greenberg offered to replace the deck for a low bid of $76,344.

==== 1960s and 1970s ====
The Perosi Electric Corporation offered to replace the pool's electrical wiring in 1961, bidding $38,998. The next year, the Board of Estimate allocated $55,000 for the replacement of pipes and gutters at the Lyons Pool and two other pools citywide. Sloan & Greenberg Inc. was hired in 1963 to replace the pool's sump pumps, and the deck was rebuilt in phases around that time. When the city government announced plans to redevelop the East Shore in 1966, the deputy commissioner of the city's Marine and Aviation Department promised that neither the Lyons Pool nor the Cromwell Center would be demolished. Park Commissioner Thomas Hoving said that no one had formally proposed replacing the pool. Robert T. Connor, the Staten Island borough president, said that any potential developer had to construct a new pool and recreational center nearby before the Lyons Pool and Cromwell Center could be razed.

During the 1960s, one Staten Island Advance reporter wrote that the Lyons Pool and Faber Park Pool were "easily two of the most important, most colorful and busiest spots on the Island during the summer months". The main pool had free swimming lessons during summer mornings, and it also hosted swimming competitions. During the off-season, the pools and recreation center were used for other sports. Further alteration plans for the Lyons Pool were announced in 1967, when NYC Parks announced that it would add reinforced-concrete decks, replace the recreation center's dome, and repair the building's facade. This project cost $125,000 and was designed by Shumavon, Buckley & Goul. The General Property Corporation proposed redeveloping the Lyons Pool and Cromwell Center in 1969; in exchange, the firm would have constructed a new recreation center and pool in Stapleton, Staten Island.

The Lyons Pool complex's underwater lighting was replaced in 1974; at the time, it was the only public pool complex in Staten Island with underwater lights. By the 1970s, Tompkinsville Pool and other city parks were in poor condition due to the 1975 New York City fiscal crisis, which prompted NYC Parks to commence a project to restore the pools in several parks in 1977. The Lyons Pool received some minor upgrades in 1978, and David K. Specter was hired the next year to design a renovation of the pools, costing $168,574. Staten Island Community Board 1 listed the pool's reconstruction as one of its highest-priority projects. Due to funding shortages, the reconstruction project did not receive any city or federal funds during fiscal year 1979.

==== 1980s renovation ====
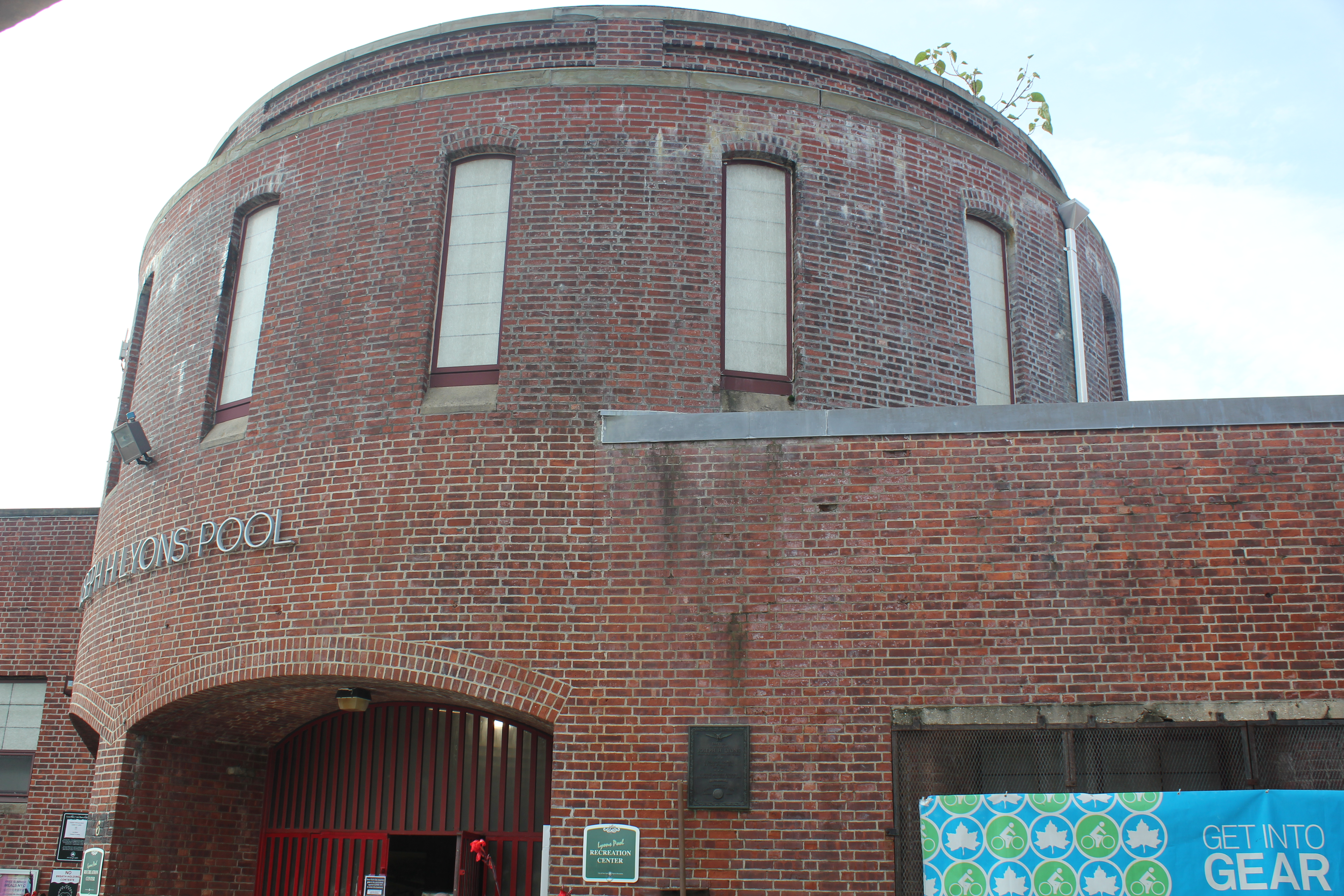
The rotunda of the pool building

The city government had allocated $3.5 million in August 1980 for a full renovation of the Lyons Pool, including a new deck, new lockers, and upgrades to all three pools. At the time, visitors had to store their clothes in unsecured baskets. The pool had around 40,000 or 50,000 visitors per year during that decade, an estimated four-fifths of whom came from Staten Island, and it operated for 10 weeks a year. By March 1981, NYC Parks had only 2,900 total staff, less than 10 percent of the 30,000 present when Moses was parks commissioner. In 1982, the NYC Parks budget increased greatly, enabling the agency to carry out $76 million worth of restoration projects by year's end. Among these projects was the renovation of the Tompkinsville Pool. Some lockers were installed at the pool complex the same year. Simultaneously, Staten Island residents were requesting that the Lyons Pool be designated as a city landmark, and the New York City Landmarks Preservation Commission (LPC) hosted hearings in October 1982 to determine whether the pools should receive official landmark status.

The city government originally wanted to close the Lyons Pool for two years, which would have saved $400,000 in operating costs. The pool complex's renovation was delayed after NYC Parks staff decided to use a different filtration system. As a result, the pools remained open during the 1983 summer season, and NYC Parks revised the timeline so the pools would be closed for only one season. Despite citywide budget cuts, the city agreed to provide $1.1 million for the complex in fiscal year 1984. Workers surveying the pool found that, because of the site's extremely high water table, one of the cement slabs under the main pool had cracked due to groundwater infiltration.

The Lyons Pool was renovated starting in November 1984 at a cost of $6.7 million. K.G. Industries was hired to repair the pool deck and recreation center. New paths, benches, diving boards, pool ladders, and fences were added to the pool area. At the recreation center, workers restored the facade; repaired the roof; added new ceilings, windows, and wheelchair-accessible bathrooms to the dressing rooms; and built two boiler rooms. The electrical and ventilation systems were upgraded. During the closure, a portable children's pool was placed on Hannah Street; city officials contemplated using the recreation center as a temporary homeless shelter. The Lyons Pool's reconstruction was supposed to be completed in June 1986 but was delayed due to material shortages. The pool reopened on August 11, 1986, and was rededicated ten days later on August 21. A roof deck above the recreation center, as well as a concession area, remained closed until 1987. Soon after the pool reopened, several violent incidents were reported there, including multiple attacks on lifeguards.

==== 1990s ====
The LPC considered the pool for landmark status in 1990, along with nine of the other ten WPA pools in the city, following efforts from preservationists who wanted to designate Brooklyn's McCarren Pool as a landmark. At a public hearing in April 1990, the office of Borough President Guy V. Molinari supported the designations, but NYC Parks opposed landmark status because it would complicate the process of renovating the other pools. The Lyons Pool was ultimately not designated at that time. During the 1990s, the Lyons Pool was popular with swimmers from all across New York City.

NYC Parks continued to face financial shortfalls in the 1990s, and the WPA pools retained a reputation for being unsafe. For the summer of 1991, Mayor David Dinkins had planned to close all 32 outdoor pools in the city, a decision that was only reversed after a $2 million donation from a trust created upon the death of real estate developer Sol Goldman and $1.8 million from other sources. Additionally, in the 1990s, a practice called "whirlpooling" became common in New York City pools such as the Lyons Pool, in which women would be inappropriately fondled by teenage boys. By the turn of the century, crimes such as sexual assaults had decreased in parks citywide due to increased security.

=== 21st century ===
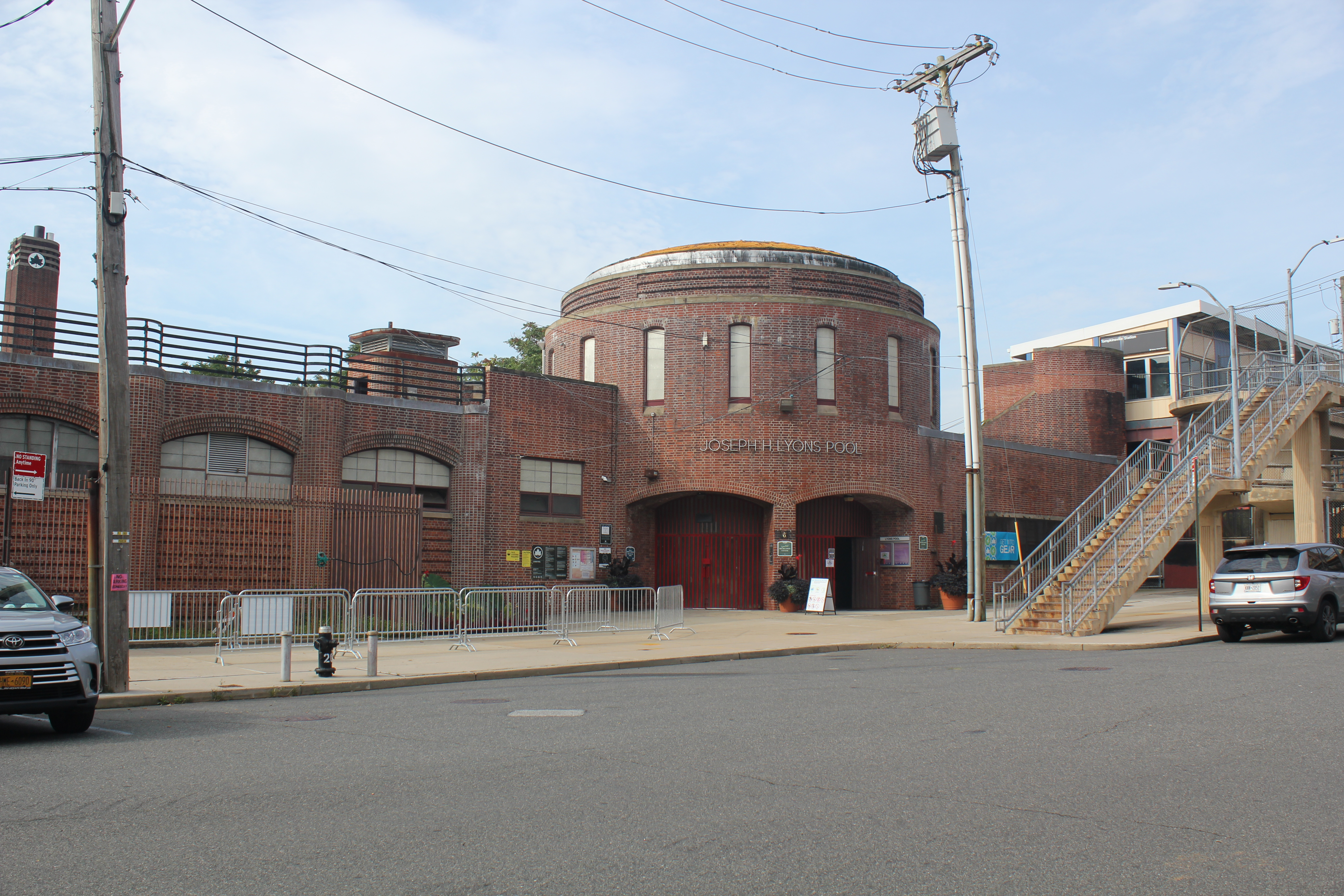
The recreation center seen from Victory Boulevard

The LPC again considered designating the ten WPA pools in New York City as official landmarks in 2007. It ultimately designated the Joseph H. Lyons Pool, as well as the bathhouse's interior and exterior, as a landmark on September 16, 2008. During this decade, The New York Times referred to the Lyons Pool as a "summer wonderland", although it was no longer free to enter and was open only to NYC Parks members. NYC Parks implemented restrictions at the main pool in 2012, requiring lap swimmers to use a smaller area of the pool and swim across its width. In response, several swimmers wrote to Mayor Michael Bloomberg to protest this change.

After the neighboring Cromwell Center was demolished in 2013, local politicians Michael McMahon and Debi Rose began advocating for the construction of a replacement structure, and NYC Parks was allocated $700,000 for a feasibility study of such a project. The feasibility study was completed in February 2017, at which point NYC Parks announced that it intended to build a 95,000-square-foot (8,800 m^{2}) recreation center above Lyons Pool's parking lot. In addition, the diving pool would be replaced with a water playground and children's playground. The Lyons Pool site had been selected because it already operated as a recreation center and was hosting programs relocated from the Cromwell Center. The Lyons Pool was temporarily closed during part of 2020 due to the COVID-19 pandemic.

NYC Parks began soliciting ideas for a new recreation center at Tompkinsville in 2021, and the recreation center was named for Mary Cali Dalton, former director of recreation for Staten Island, that year. In November 2022, NYC Parks and the New York City Department of Design and Construction (DDC) announced that the Mary Cali Dalton Recreation Center was to be built above the Lyons Pool's parking lot at a cost of $92 million. Designed by ikon.5 and built by Kokolakis Contracting, this recreation center would be the first-ever structure built by NYC Parks under a single design–build contract. NYC Parks announced in January 2023 that the rotunda of Lyons Pool's bathhouse was to be renovated at a cost of $2.6 million; at the time, the project was slated to be completed in 2024. Work on the Mary Cali Dalton Recreation Center commenced in February 2024, and it was to have been completed by 2025. The recreation center's opening was delayed to early 2026 due to delays in installing electrical ducts under part of Murray Hulbert Avenue, which, unknown to city officials, had been a private street.

== See also ==
- List of New York City Designated Landmarks in Staten Island
