= Henry Beaumont Herts =

American architect

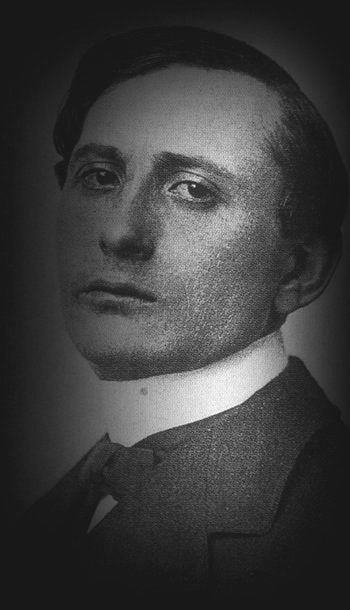
Herts, circa 1912

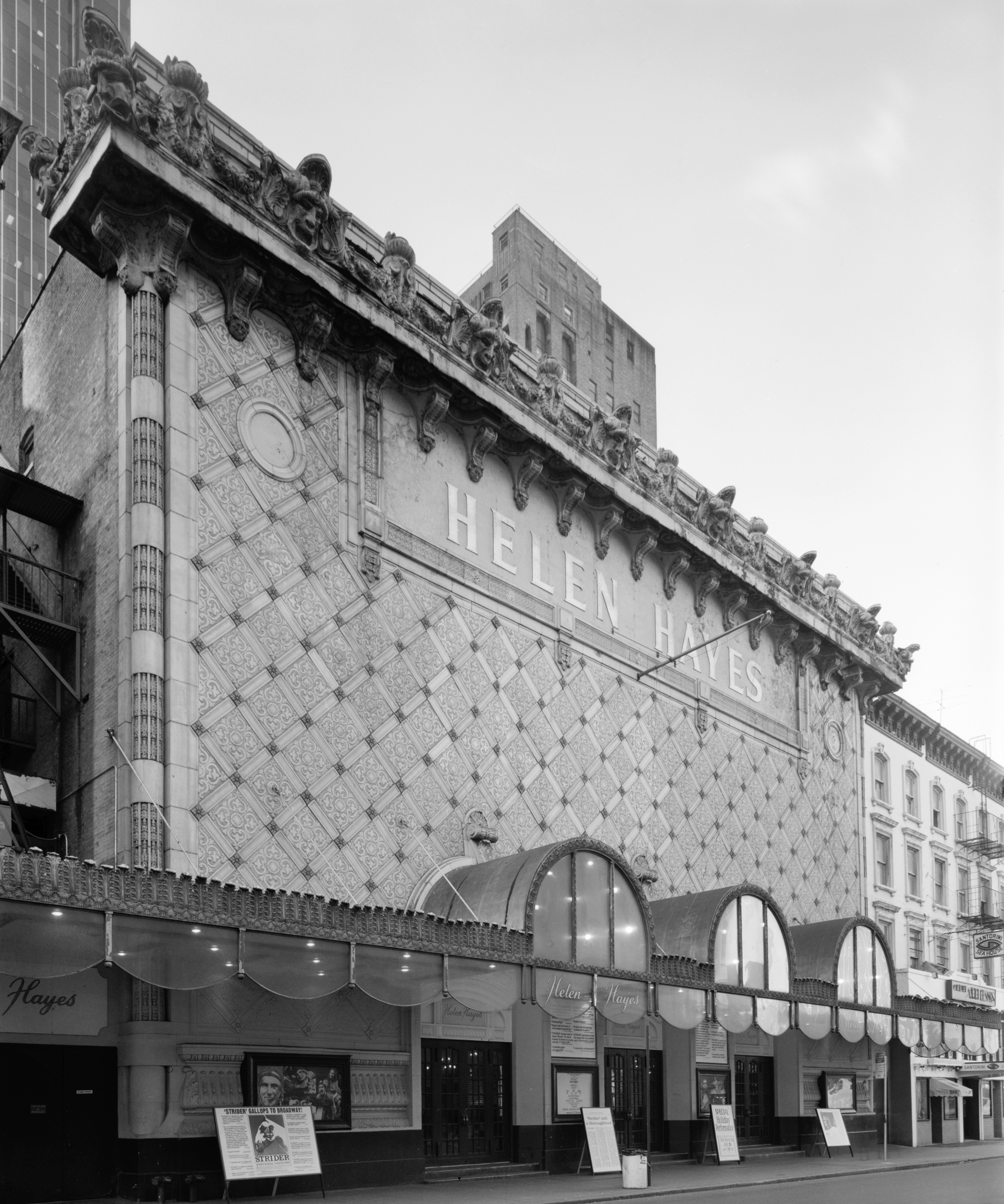
Fulton (Helen Hayes) Theater, 42nd Street in New York City, circa 1980 (razed)

Henry Beaumont Herts (January 23, 1871 – March 27, 1933) was an American architect.

Herts was born in New York City, attended Columbia University without graduating, and apprenticed under Bruce Price. He studied architecture in Europe at the École nationale supérieure des Beaux-Arts in Paris and at the Universities of Rome and Heidelberg.

In 1900 Herts, with partner Hugh Tallant, formed Herts & Tallant and became known for their theater designs. Tallant was the designer, and Herts serving as the engineer and businessperson. The 1903 New Amsterdam Theatre was their first big success, followed by the Fulton (razed in 1982), the Gaiety (razed in 1982), the Liberty (defunct in 1933), the Lyceum, and the Brooklyn Academy of Music. Herts perfected the cantilevered arch construction that enabled theater architects to support balconies without the use of columns.

The partnership with Tallant ended in 1912. Herts continued in business with assistant Herbert J. Krapp and produced the Booth, the companion Shubert, and the Longacre Theaters. Krapp left the firm in 1915.

Herts also served as architect for the playground commission of New York City, and designed Rice Memorial Stadium in Pelham Bay Park in the Bronx (razed in 1989) and the Betsy Head Memorial Playground in Brownsville, Brooklyn. He also studied fireproofing methods and aided the New York City Fire Department in developing building codes and designed the Guggenheim family mausoleum at Salem Fields Cemetery in Brooklyn.

Herts retired in 1928 due to poor health and died in 1933 at Montefiore Hospital in the Bronx. His papers are held at the Avery Architectural and Fine Arts Library at Columbia University.
