= Highbridge Park =

Public park in Manhattan, New York

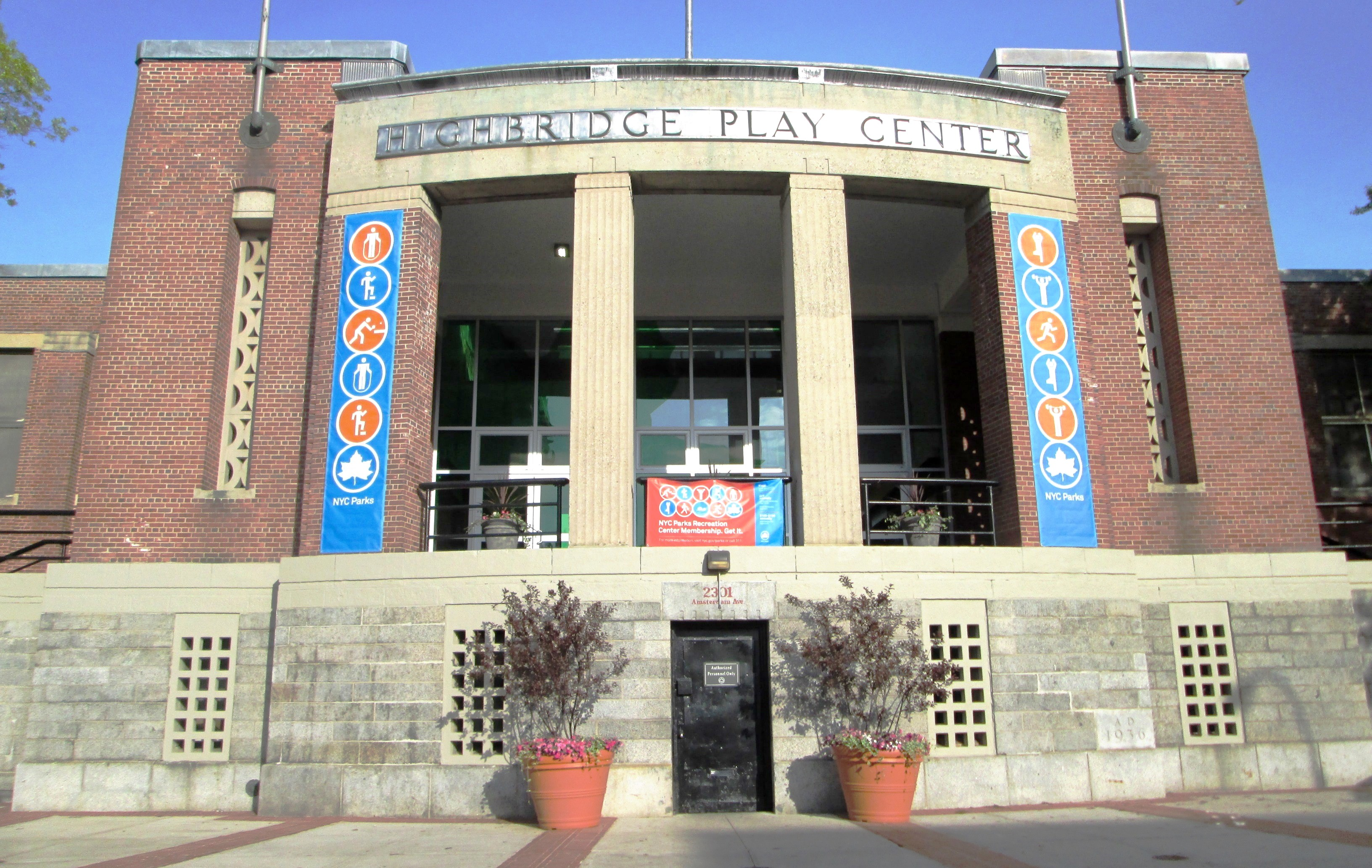
- Highbridge Play Center
- Interactive map of Highbridge Park
- Type: Urban park
- Location: Washington Heights, Manhattan, New York City
- Coordinates: 40°50′49″N 73°55′48″W
- Area: 119 acres (48 ha)
- Created: 1865
- Operator: NYC Parks
- Public transit: Subway: to 155th Street or 163rd Street–Amsterdam Avenue to 168th Street to 181st Street, 191st Street, or Dyckman Street; Bus: M2, M3, M98, M100, M101, Bx3, Bx6, Bx6 SBS, Bx11, Bx13, Bx35, Bx36

New York City Landmark
- Designated: June 26, 2007
- Reference no.: 2237
- Designated entity: Bathhouse facade and pool

Highbridge Park is a public park on the western bank of the Harlem River in Washington Heights, Manhattan, New York City. It stretches between 155th Street and Dyckman Street in Upper Manhattan. The park is operated by the New York City Department of Parks and Recreation. The City maintains the southern half of the park, while the northern half is maintained by the non-profit New York Restoration Project. Prominent in the park are the Manhattan end of the High Bridge, the High Bridge Water Tower, and the Highbridge Play Center.

== History ==
Highbridge Park derives its name from New York City’s oldest standing bridge, the High Bridge (1848), which was built to carry the Old Croton Aqueduct over the Harlem River. From the 17th to the 19th centuries, the area was sparsely populated with scattered farms and private estates. During the American Revolution, General George Washington used the Morris-Jumel Mansion, adjacent to the southern end of the park near Edgecombe Avenue and West 160th Street, as his headquarters in September and October 1776.

=== Establishment ===
The New York City Department of Public Parks acquired a 2.25-mile (3.62 km) strip of land on the Harlem River between 155th and Dyckman Streets in May 1884. Afterward, several commissioners were appointed to assess the value of existing land lots within the park. Local landowners complained about a New York state law that would force them to pay for half of the park's assessed value. A New York Supreme Court judge halted the project in 1886 following disputes over property appraisals. The park hosted the 1887 USA Cross Country Championships. In February 1888, Samuel Parsons Jr. and Calvert Vaux were ordered to prepare plans for Highbridge Park, with a main entrance at 159th Street. That June, the secretary of the city's Board of Street Opening was asked to prepare a resolution setting the park's northern and southern borders at 186th and 155th Streets, respectively. The borders were revised in December 1888 to encompass the land between Tenth (Amsterdam) Avenue to the west and the Harlem River to the east.

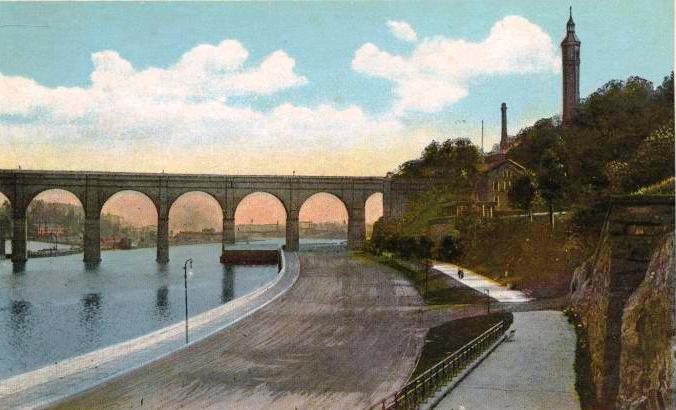
Photo-mechanical print of the Harlem River Speedway in the early 20th century showing river access from Highbridge Park

Three men were appointed in April 1889 to appraise 1,976 lots on the site; one of the appointees, former U.S. President Grover Cleveland, declined the position. Property owners continued to oppose the new park, speaking out against a proposed northward extension to Dyckman Street that would have cost $2.5 million. In December 1889, the Board of Street Opening formally decided to reduce the park from 79 to 52.62 acres (31.97 to 21.29 ha), running only from 170th to 181st Street. The majority of the new park, approximately 30 acres (12 ha), was to incorporate the original High Bridge Park on the same site.

The area between 190th and 192nd Streets was occupied by the Fort George Amusement Park, a trolley park/amusement park, from 1895 to 1914; its site is now a seating area in Highbridge Park. A racetrack for horses, the Harlem River Speedway, was opened along the riverbank of the park in 1898.

=== 20th century ===
==== Early 20th century ====
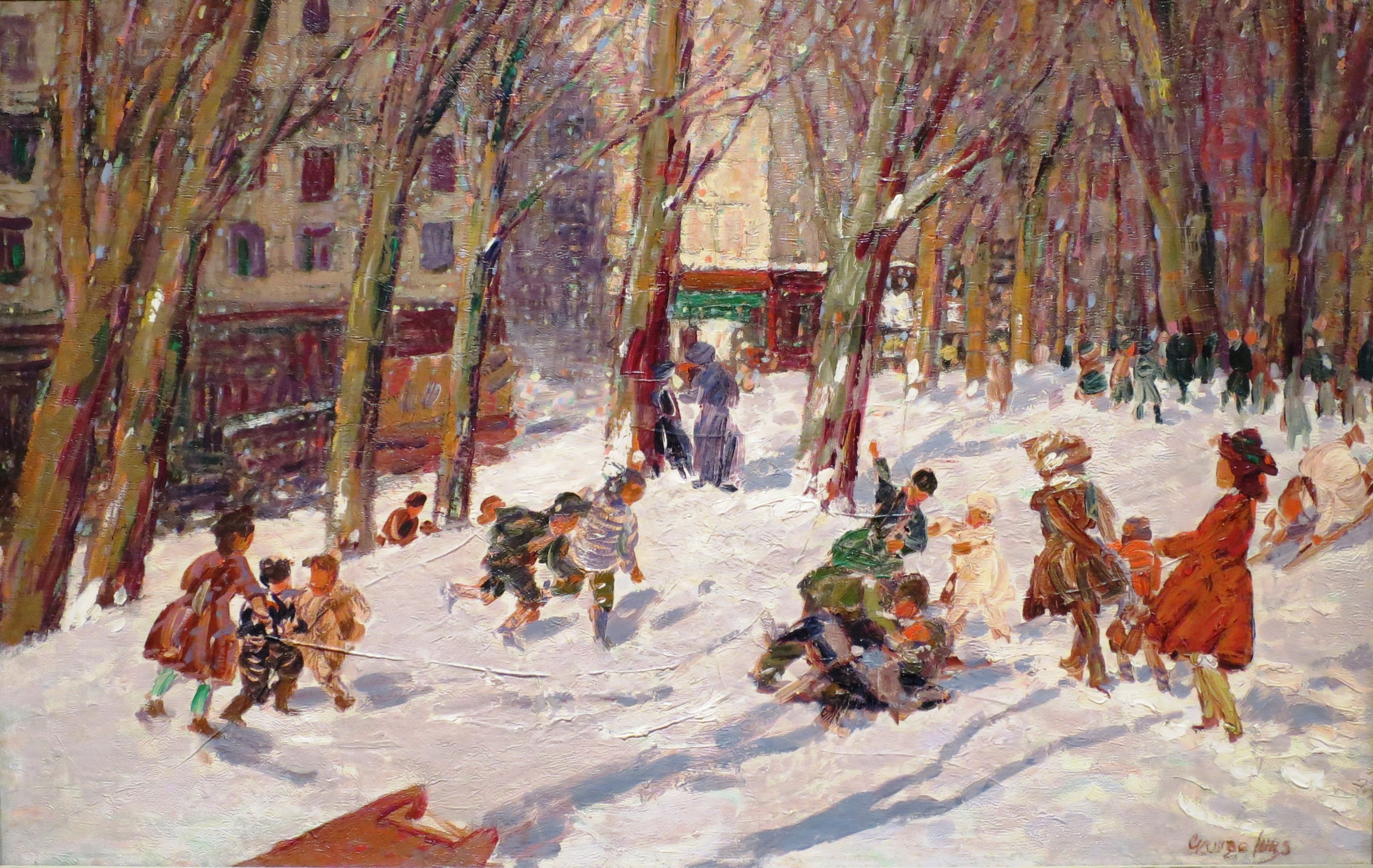
Highbridge Park in winter, c. 1912, by George Benjamin Luks

The cliffside area from West 181st Street to Dyckman Street was acquired in 1902, and the parcel including Fort George Hill was acquired in 1928. In 1934 the Department of Parks obtained the Highbridge Tower and the site of the old Highbridge Reservoir.

By the early years of the 20th century, upper-middle class New Yorkers would promenade along the wide boardwalks in top hats and bustles. The park provided access to the Harlem River and places for horseback riding and other outdoor sports. By the 1920s dirt and other materials from the build-up of the new Washington Heights neighborhood threatened to ruin the nascent park; a harbinger of bad times to befall the park.

==== Works Progress Administration renovation ====
In 1934, mayor Fiorello H. La Guardia nominated Robert Moses to become commissioner of a unified New York City Department of Parks and Recreation. At the time, the United States was experiencing the Great Depression; immediately after La Guardia won the 1933 election, Moses began to write "a plan for putting 80,000 men to work on 1,700 relief projects". By the time he was in office, several hundred such projects were underway across the city.

Moses was especially interested in creating new pools and other bathing facilities, such as those in Jacob Riis Park, Jones Beach, and Orchard Beach. He devised a list of 23 pools around the city, including one at Highbridge Park. The pools would be built using funds from the Works Progress Administration (WPA), a federal agency created as part of the New Deal to combat the Depression's negative effects. Eleven of these pools were to be designed concurrently and open in 1936. Moses, along with the architects Aymar Embury II and Gilmore David Clarke, created a common design for these proposed aquatic centers. Each location was to have distinct pools for diving, swimming, and wading; bleachers and viewing areas; and bathhouses with locker rooms that could be used as gymnasiums. The pools were to have several common features, such as a minimum 55-yard (50 m) length, underwater lighting, heating, and filtration, all constructed using inexpensive materials. To fit the requirement for efficiency and low-cost construction, each building would be built using elements of the Streamline Moderne and Classical architectural styles. The buildings would also be near "comfort stations", additional playgrounds, and spruced-up landscapes.

Construction for some of the 11 pools began that October, with work commencing on the Highbridge and Hamilton Fish Pools. Highbridge Park had been among the first pool sites to be selected, having been announced by The New York Times in April 1934. By mid-1936, ten of the eleven WPA funded pools were completed and were being opened at a rate of one per week. The Highbridge Pool was the fifth of these pools to open, (Note: The pools opened in the following chronological order: Hamilton Fish Park, Thomas Jefferson Park, Astoria Park, Tompkinsville Pool, Highbridge Park, Sunset Park, Crotona Park, McCarren Park, Betsy Head Park, Colonial Park, and Red Hook Park.) being opened on July 14, 1936. The complex included a 166-by-288-foot (51 by 88 m) main pool and 166-by-288-foot (51 by 88 m) wading pool.

==== Later 20th century ====
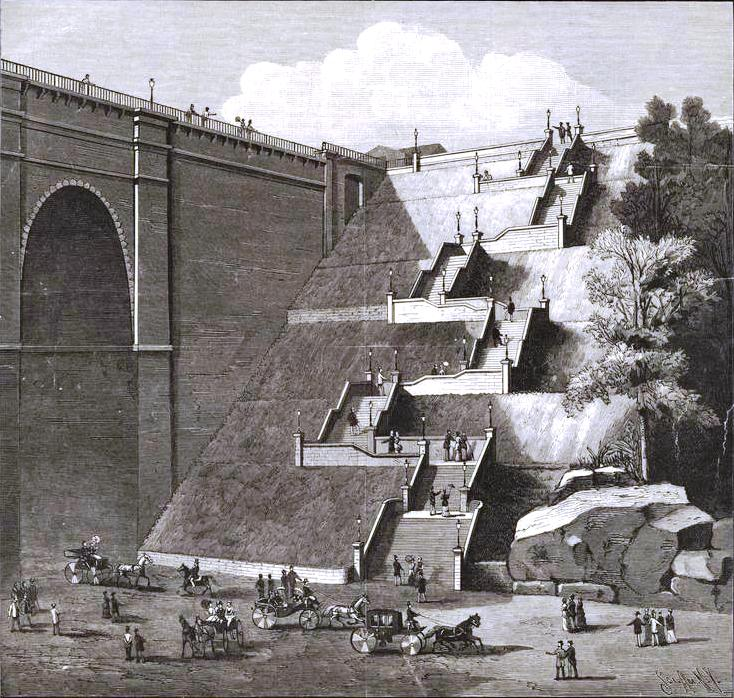
Grand staircase, later cut by the vehicular ramp for the Trans-Manhattan Expressway

In 1940, Moses turned portions of the Speedway into the Harlem River Drive, a 6-lane highway from the Manhattan end of the Triborough Bridge at 125th Street, to the tunnels under Manhattan to the George Washington Bridge. New fences blocked public recreational access to the riverfront. It was this series of actions, according to Parks & Recreation Commissioner Adrian Benepe, that "ruined" the park. The Highbridge Play Center bathhouse was restored in the 1960s, during which the original murals by Charles Clarke were destroyed or covered over. The 1,200-foot-long (370 m), 116-foot-tall (35 m) High Bridge walkway was closed to regular public use around 1970.

The controversial 'Daisy Girl' political advertisement was filmed in Highbridge Park in the summer of 1964.

By the 1970s, Highbridge Park and other city parks were in poor condition following the 1975 New York City fiscal crisis. Particularly in Highbridge Park, large sections set aside as natural areas, had been taken over by homeless people who built permanent shacks made of sheet metal and steel pipes driven into the earth. Prostitutes, drug dealers and drug users frequented the park. NYC Parks commenced a project to restore the pools in several parks in 1977, including at Highbridge Park, for whose restoration the agency set aside an estimated $5.8 million. These projects were not carried out due to a lack of money. By March 1981, NYC Parks had only 2,900 employees in its total staff, less than 10 percent of the 30,000 present when Moses was parks commissioner. In 1982, the NYC Parks budget increased greatly, enabling the agency to carry out $76 million worth of restoration projects by year's end; among these projects was the restoration of the Highbridge Park pool. The play center and pool were completely renovated over a three-year period following a design by architect Stephen B. Jacobs. The play center reopened on June 14, 1985.

NYC Parks continued to face financial shortfalls in the coming years, and the pools retained a reputation for high crime. In June 1984, a man set fire to the Highbridge Tower roof before jumping to his death. By the mid-1980s, Highbridge had become so degraded that during a manual cleanup in 1986, 250 tons of garbage and 25 auto wrecks were removed, but garbage again began to fill the park within a matter of days. For the summer of 1991, mayor David Dinkins had planned to close all 32 outdoor pools in the city, a decision that was only reversed after a $2 million donation from a trust created upon the death of real estate developer Sol Goldman and $1.8 million from other sources. Additionally, in the 1990s, a practice called "whirlpooling" became common in New York City pools such as Highbridge Park, in which women would be inappropriately fondled by teenage boys. By the turn of the century, crimes such as sexual assaults had decreased in parks citywide due to increased security.

The condition of Highbridge Park has gotten better, and it is no longer a haven for petty crime and other illegal activities. In November 1991, the water tower was restored. The New York Restoration Project, chaired by Bette Midler, has been working since 1999 to restore the park. The park also received a renovation in 1996, which included a $305,000 pool filtration system and a $445,000 renovation of heating and ventilation in the pool area.

=== 21st century ===
On May 19, 2007, the first legal mountain bike trails and dirt jumps in New York City were opened in Highbridge Park. New York City Mountain Bike Association, working with NYC Parks & Recreation, and the International Mountain Bicycling Association (IMBA), worked to design and install the trails; the opening weekend featured a festival and cross-country mountain bike race. Around 2010, the waterfront Speedway was rehabilitated and reopened as the Harlem River portion of the Manhattan Waterfront Greenway.

By late 2011, despite the efforts of both the NYRP and NYC Parks, the infrastructure of the park had decayed significantly. The city announced plans for a skatepark under the Hamilton Bridge in 2013, and it opened the following year. The city also announced plans for an ice-skating rink in 2014. A citizen-driven restoration movement culminated in a grant from the Bloomberg administration to repair the bridge and make some other improvements. The restored bridge was reopened on June 9, 2015. However, the park itself still faced several problems. A writer for Curbed NY observed that there were homeless encampments under the Harlem River Drive, and that much of the park south of Washington Bridge remained overgrown. In contrast, the NYRP-maintained northern section of the park was extremely clean.

In 2016, about $30 million in funding was allocated for further improvements to the park's recreational facilities as part of the city's Anchor Parks program. At the time, NYC Parks postponed plans for an ice-skating rink due to a lack of interest. The first phase of Highbridge Park's renovations started in December 2018. This entailed upgrades to lighting and paths, cleanup of a 10-block section of the park, restoration of the "Grand Staircase", creation of a "welcome garden" at Dyckman Street, and creation of an ADA-accessible entrance plaza at 184th Street. The second phase, which started in July 2019, included restoration of the water tower and the Adventure Playground at 164th Street.

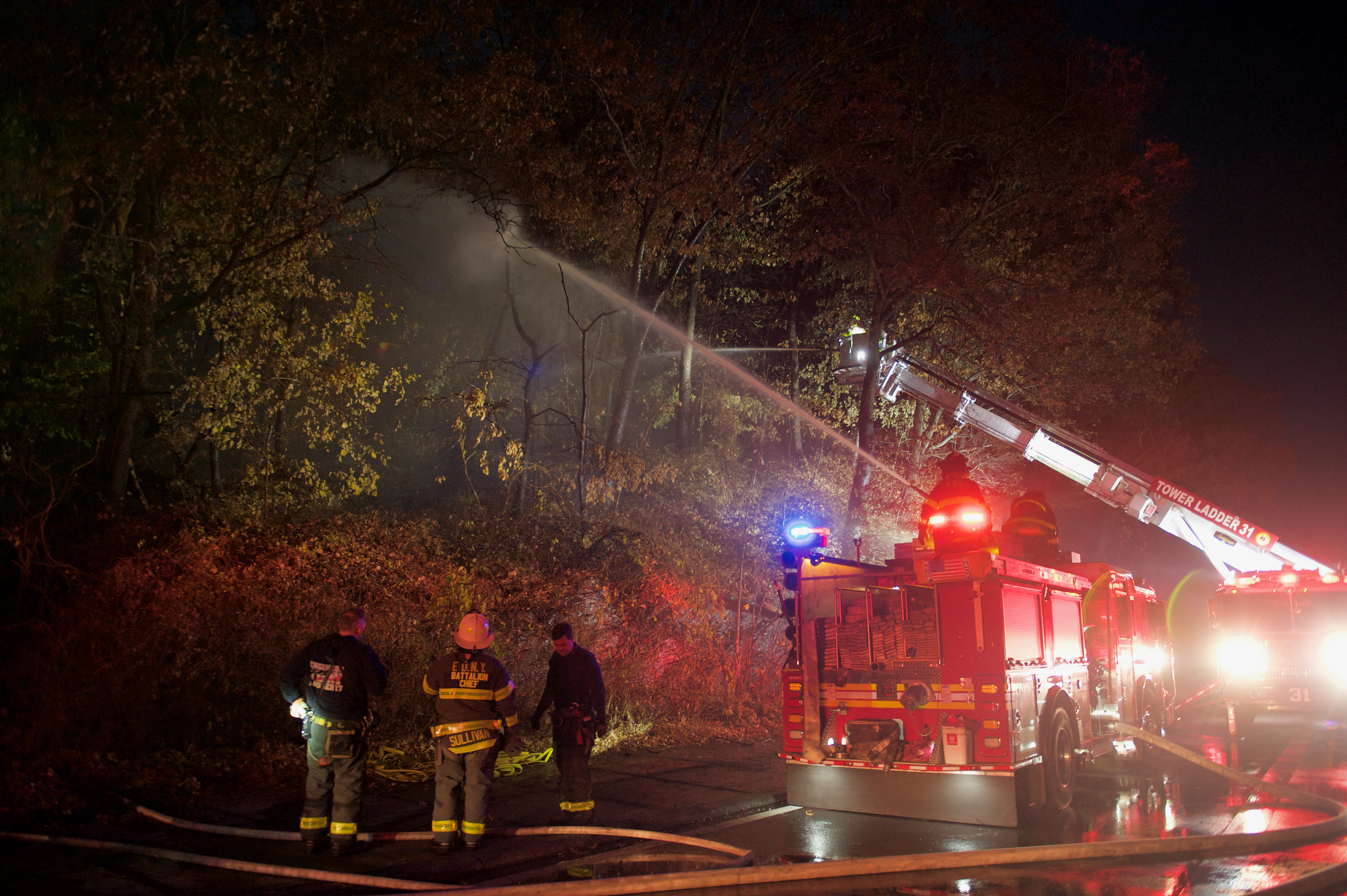
Firefighters putting out a brush fire in 2024

10–15 acres of dense brush caught fire in November 2024, as part of a series of wildfires in the Northeast United States due to a drought. For many hours, smoke from it billowed over Harlem River Drive. The section that burned is steep, dense, and without much water.

== Attractions and facilities ==
=== Playgrounds ===
There are six playgrounds in Highbridge Park:

- Adventure Playground, at the intersection of 164th Street and Edgecombe Avenue. It was created in 1973, emulating the concept of adventure playgrounds in Europe, and was renovated again in 1989 and 2017.
- CPF Playground, at 173rd Street near the pool
- Fort George Playground, at the intersection of Fort George Avenue and St. Nicholas Avenue. It was named after Fort George and was formerly the site of Fort George Amusement Park before it was destroyed in 1914. The playground was acquired by NYC Parks in 1928 and restored in 1999.
- Quisqueya Playground, at the intersection of 180th Street and Amsterdam Avenue. The name "Quisqueya", honoring the local Dominican community, means "cradle of life" which was a native name for Hispaniola. The playground was created in 1934 and restored in 1998.
- Sunken Playground, at the intersection of 167th Street and Edgecombe Avenue
- Wallenberg Playground, at the intersection of 189th Street and Amsterdam Avenue

=== High Bridge Water Tower ===
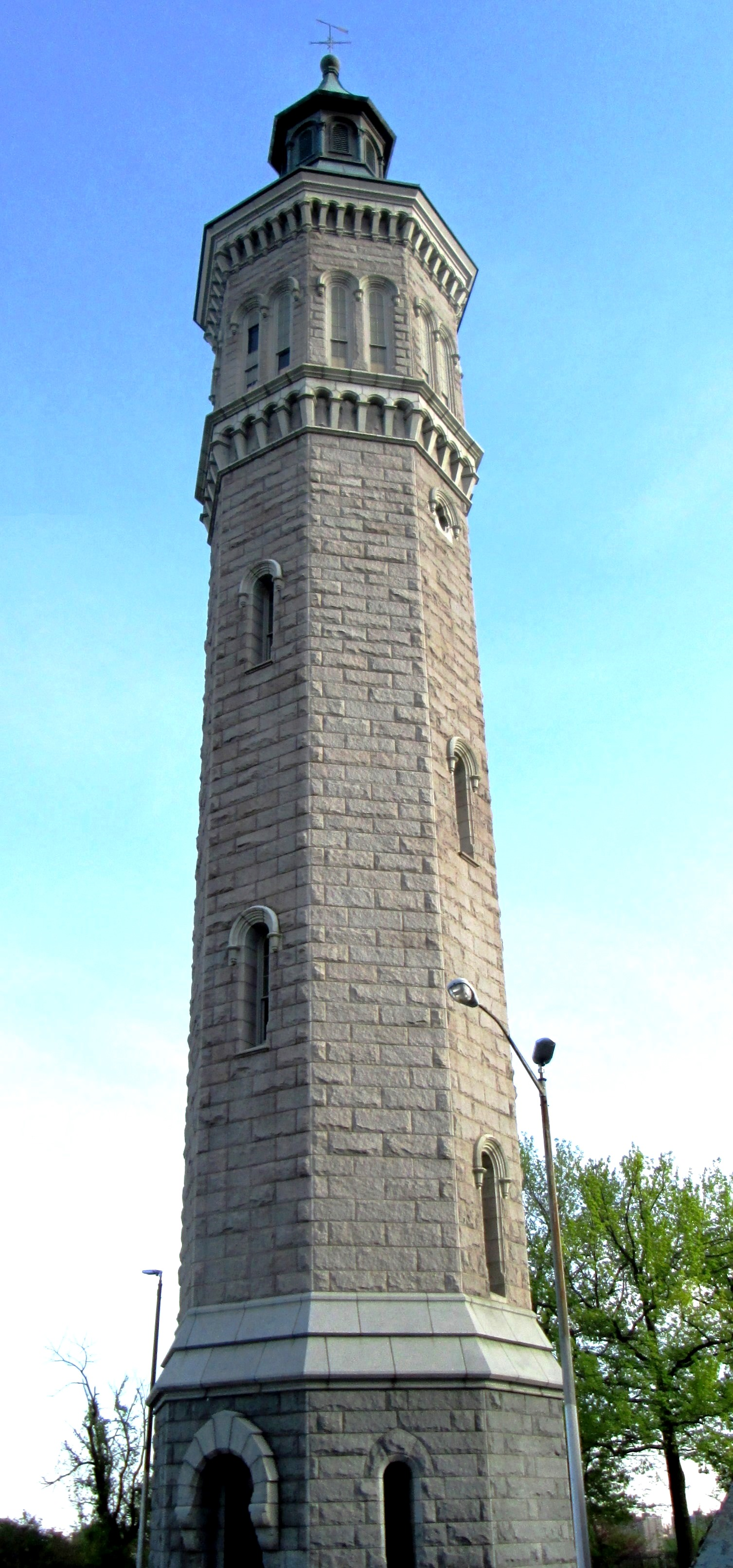
The tower, seen from the north

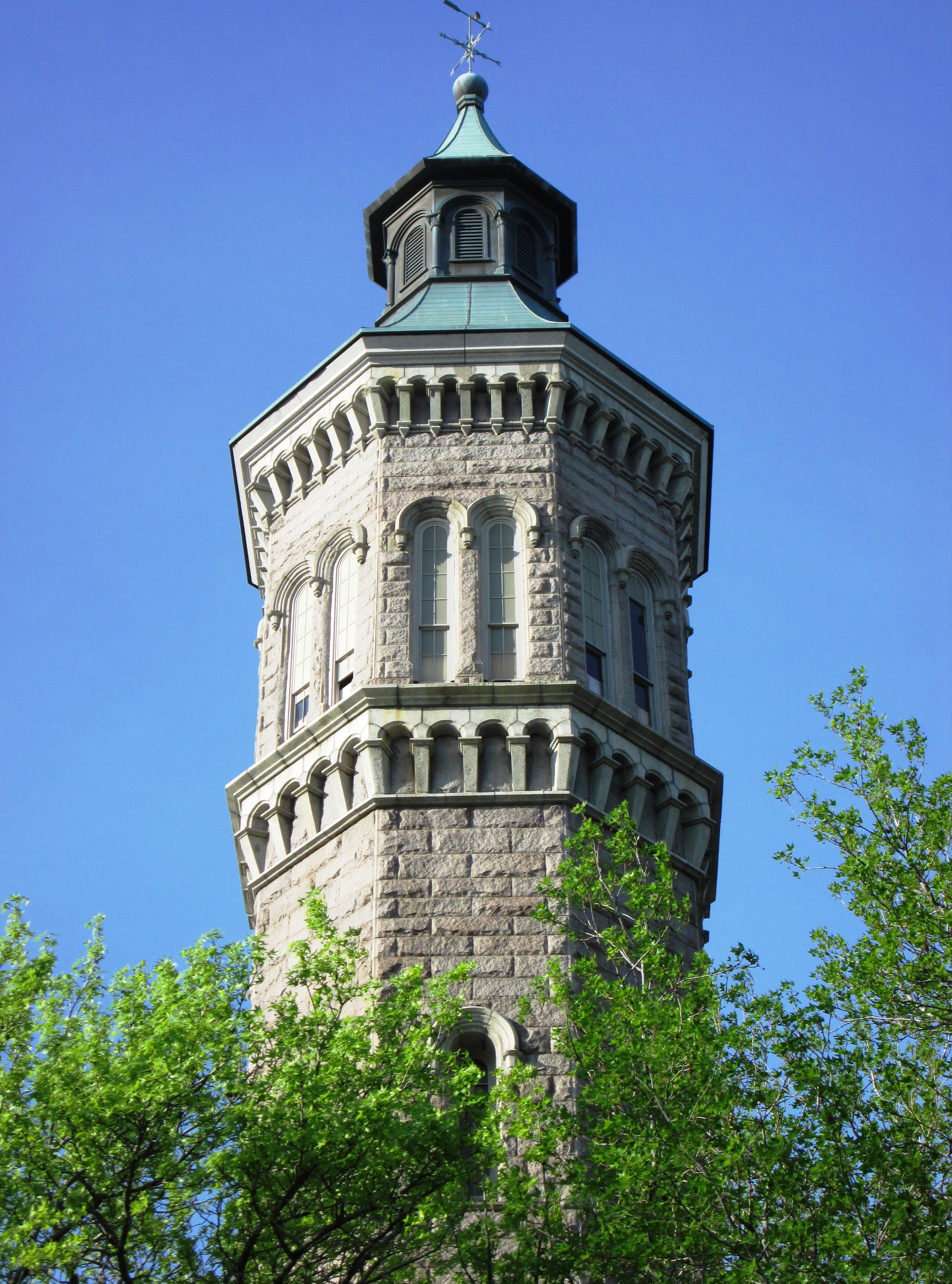
The top of the tower, seen from the south

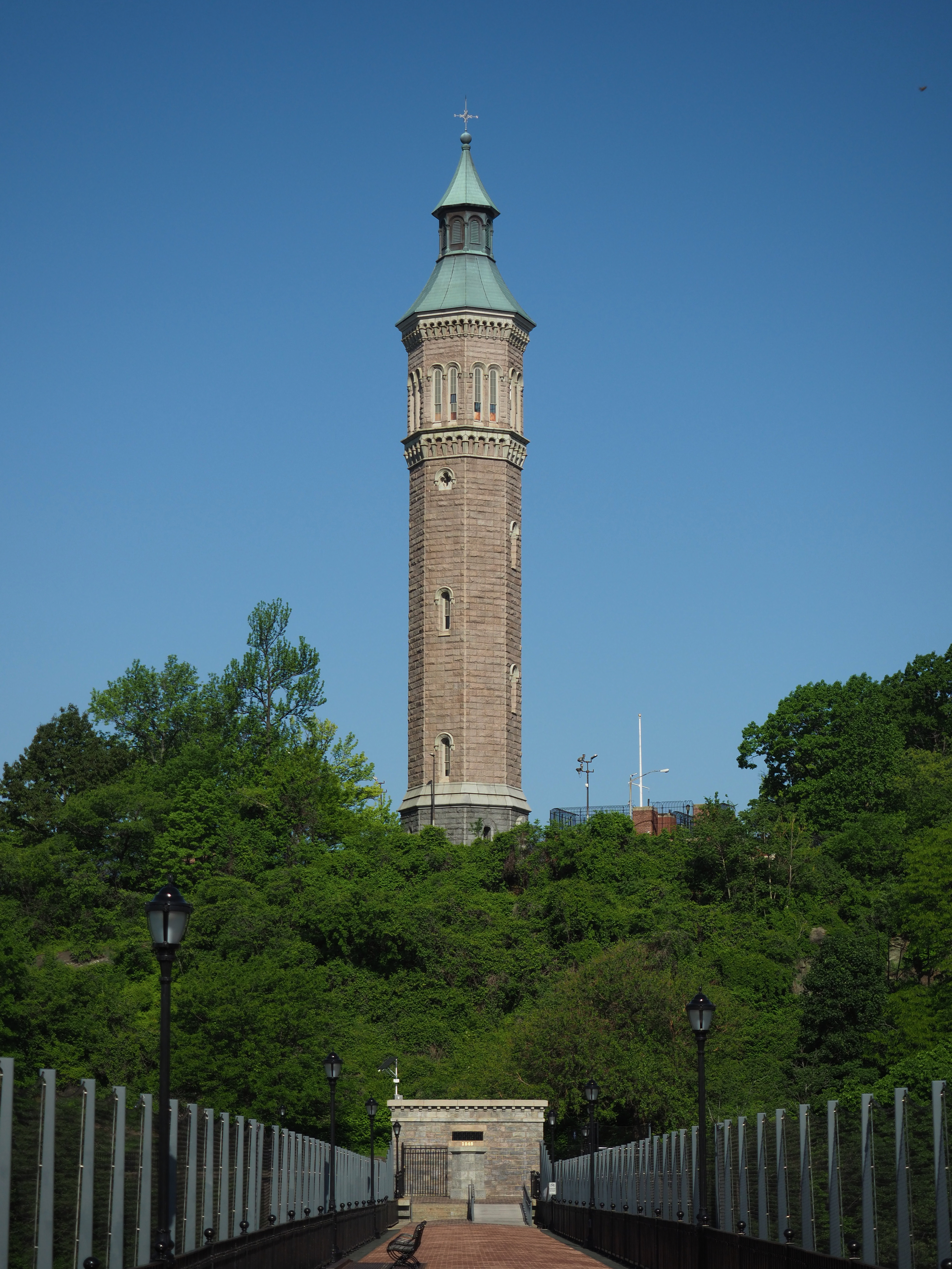
From mid-span of High Bridge

The High Bridge Water Tower is in Highbridge Park between West 173rd and 174th streets, on top of the ridge at the Manhattan end of the High Bridge. The 200-foot (61 m) octagonal tower, which was authorized by the State Legislature in 1863, was designed by John B. Jervis, the engineer who supervised the bridge's and aqueduct's construction. Water was pumped up 100 feet (30 m) to Highbridge Reservoir, a 7-acre (2.8 ha) reservoir next to the tower, which then provided water to be lifted to the tower's 47,000 US gallons (180 m^{3}) tank. This "high service" improved the water system's gravity pressure, necessary because of the increased use of flush toilets.

The tower's load-bearing exterior stonework was designed in a mixture of the Romanesque Revival and neo-Grec styles. Christopher Gray said of the tower's design that "Its rock-faced granite gives the tower a chunky, fortified appearance, as if it were a lookout for a much larger castle complex that was never built.... The granite is competently handled, but the details are not very inspired or elegant. The tower is more picturesque than beautiful." The interior of the tower, which was never open to the public, features a wide well-detailed iron spiral staircase with six large landings and paired windows.

The tower was built in 1866–1872 to help meet the ever-increasing demands on the city's water system, and the High Bridge system reached its full capacity by 1875. With the opening of the New Croton Aqueduct in 1890, the High Bridge system became less relied upon; during World War I, it was completely shut down when sabotage was feared. The tower was removed from service in 1949, and it was proposed for demolition the next year to make way for a planned highway interchange between Harlem River Drive and the 178th–179th Street Tunnels. The tower was saved when New York City Department of Parks and Recreation (NYC Parks) offered to take over control. A carillon, donated by the Altman Foundation, was installed in 1958. The tower's cupola was damaged by an arson fire in 1984. It was reconstructed, cleaned and restored in 1989–1990 by the William A. Hall Partnership. The High Bridge Water Tower underwent a 10-year, $5 million renovation during the 2010s and reopened to the public in November 2021. After the water tower reopened, NYC Parks began hosting free tours of the structure.

=== Highbridge Play Center ===
The Highbridge Play Center, on Amsterdam Avenue between West 172nd and West 174th Streets, was built in 1934-36 in the Art Moderne style, during the Fiorello LaGuardia administration. The supervising architect was Aymar Embury II, and the landscape architect was Gilmore D. Clarke, among others. It was built on the site of the Highbridge Reservoir and features a swimming pool.

==== Bathhouse ====
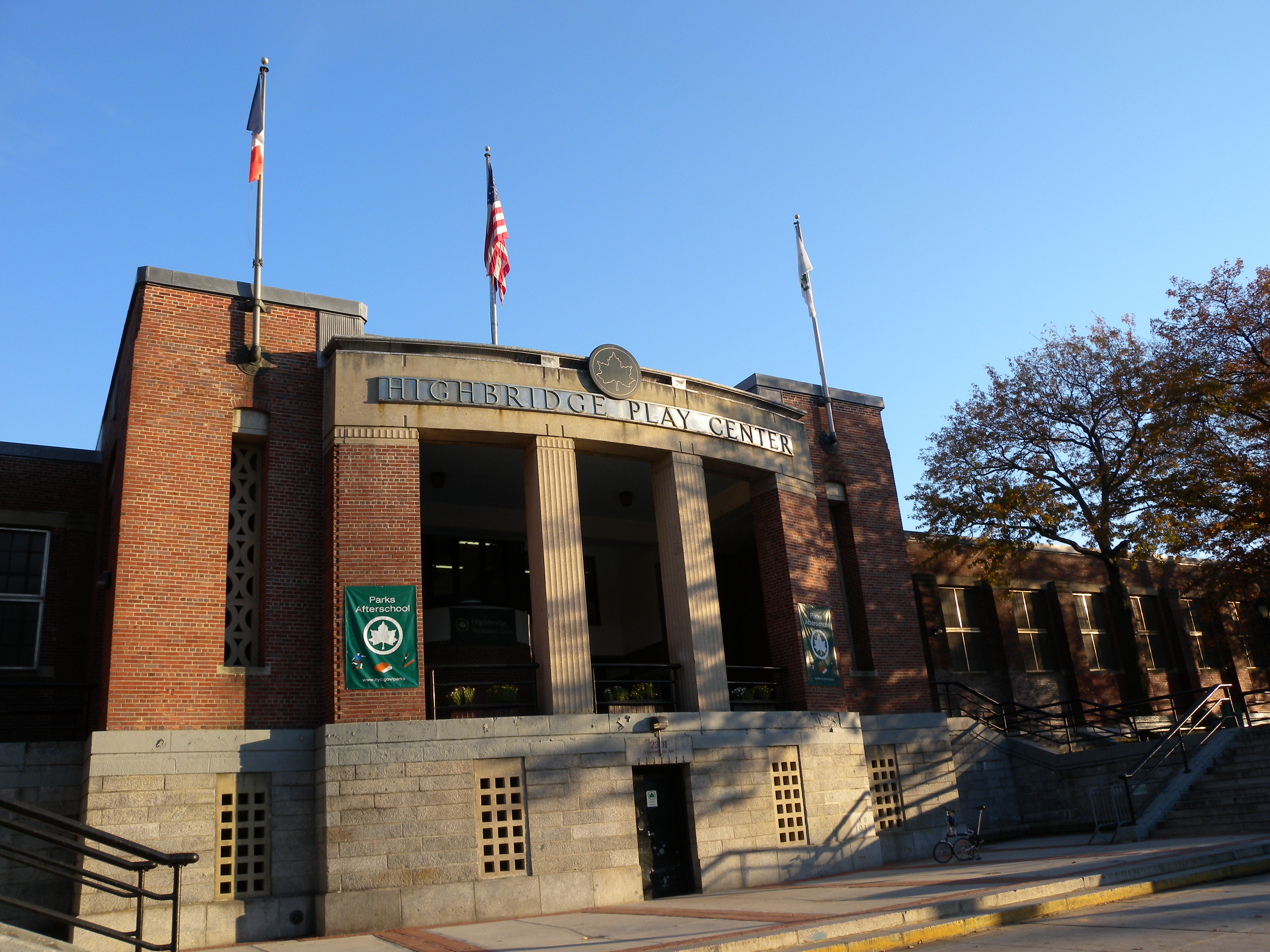
Main entrance

The bathhouse is set on an ashlar base above the surrounding street level, while the rest of the structure is made of brick. The building is rectangular: the longer side is on a north-south axis (i.e. parallel to Amsterdam Avenue), while the shorter side is on a west-east axis (i.e. parallel to 173rd Street). Its main entrance is on an elevated, slightly projecting portico at Amsterdam Avenue and 173rd Street. Stone staircases on either side ascend to the portico. The portico itself consists of two brick towers with flagpoles, two concrete piers that carry a concrete architrave, and a bronze sign with the words highbridge play center at the top of the architrave. Just inside the portico, there is a circular turret with a second-story loft, overlooking the first-floor entrance.

The north and south wings respectively contain the women's and men's locker rooms and are nearly identical. Both have nine windows separated by eight brick pilasters. The stone capitals of the pilasters line up with the lintels of the windows. Ramps lead from the extreme ends of each wing. The ground slopes down northward, so that the northern wing is at a higher elevation above the ground than the southern wing. The eastern facade is similar to the western facade, except that it contains entrances to both genders' respective locker rooms, as well as a bronze clock hanging from the architrave. A cellar is below the northern wing.

==== Pools ====
The Highbridge Pool contains two rectangular pools: a main pool to the east and a wading pool to the west. The main pool measures 228 feet (69 m) wide by 165 feet (50 m) long, with the wider dimension extending north-south, (Note: Dimensions of the main pool are alternatively given as 220 by 162 feet (67 by 49 m).) and a depth of 10.5 feet (3.2 m). The wading pool measures 228 feet (69 m) wide by 97 feet (30 m) long. A 29-foot-wide (8.8 m) promenade surrounds the pool area on the north, south, and east sides. A set of concrete bleachers is to the north of the pool area. A short brick wall encloses the pool area, and niches along the eastern boundary provide another seating area. Just east of the pool area is a set of stairs that leads to the High Bridge. The water tower is at the northeast corner of the pool area.

== Landmark designations ==
The High Bridge Water Tower was designated a New York City landmark by the New York City Landmarks Preservation Commission in 1967. The Play Center was designated a New York City landmark by the New York City Landmarks Preservation Commission in 2007. The commission had also considered the pool for landmark status in 1990, along with the other ten WPA pools in the city.

== See also ==
- List of New York City Designated Landmarks in Manhattan above 110th Street
