= Washington Bridge (Harlem River) =

Bridge between Manhattan and the Bronx, New York

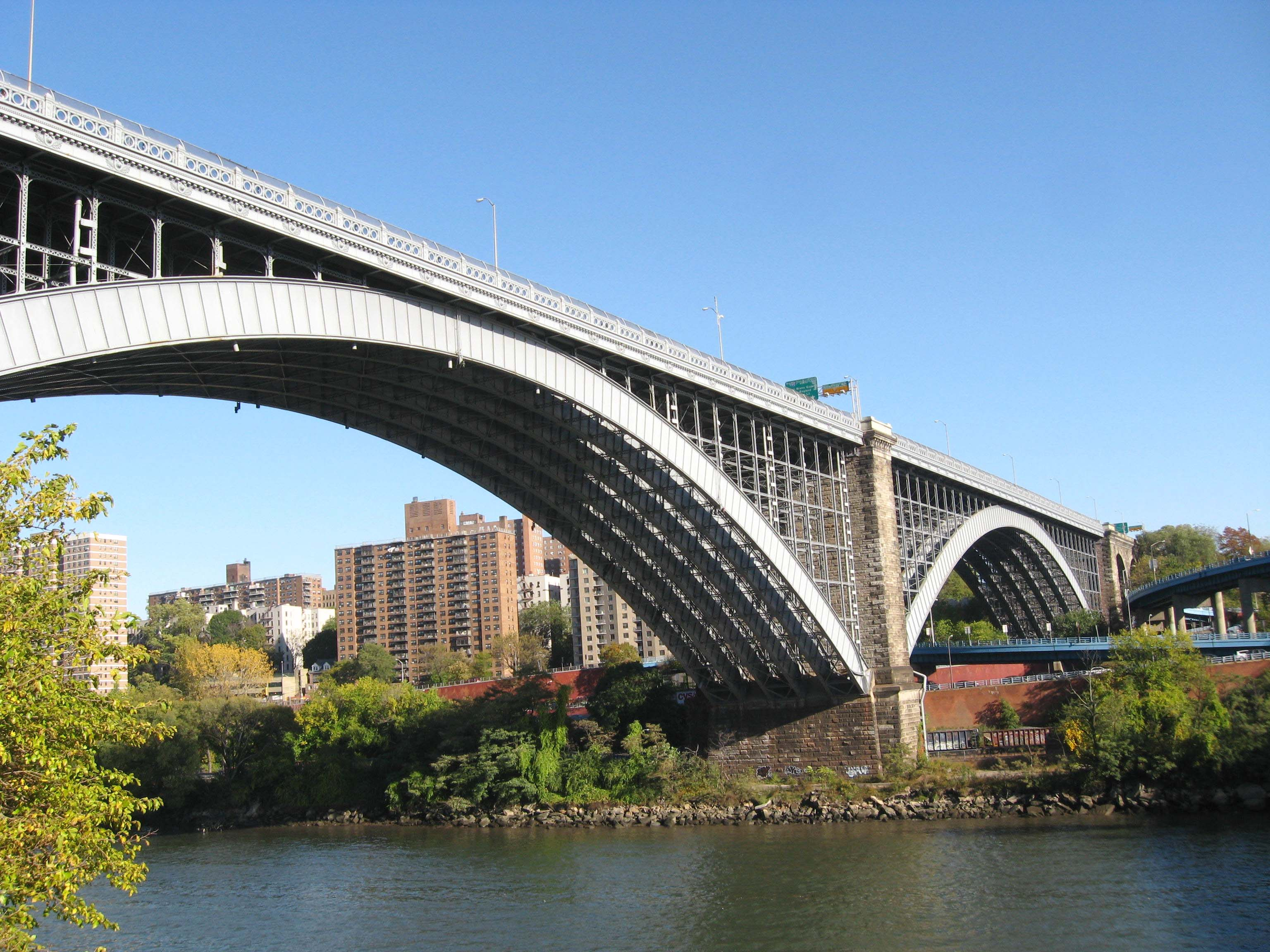
- Main arch over Harlem River; secondary arch over Metro-North Railroad and Major Deegan Expressway in the Bronx
- Coordinates: 40°50′48″N 73°55′40″W
- Carries: 6 lanes of roadway; two sidewalks
- Crosses: Harlem River
- Locale: Manhattan and the Bronx, New York City
- Maintained by: New York City Department of Transportation
- ID number: 000000002066919

Characteristics
- Design: Arch bridge
- Total length: 2,375 feet (724 m)
- Longest span: 510 feet (160 m)
- Clearance below: 134 feet (41 m)

History
- Opened: December 1, 1888; 137 years ago

Statistics
- Daily traffic: 57,647 (2016)
- Washington Bridge
- U.S. National Register of Historic Places
- New York State Register of Historic Places
- New York City Landmark
- Location: Between Amsterdam and Undercliff Aves., New York, New York
- Coordinates: 40°50′42″N 73°55′29″W
- Area: 2.5 acres (1.0 ha)
- Built: 1886
- Architect: Charles C. Schneider and Wilhelm Hildenbrand
- NRHP reference No.: 83001645
- NYSRHP No.: 06101.001643
- NYCL No.: 1222

Significant dates
- Added to NRHP: September 22, 1983
- Designated NYSRHP: August 18, 1983
- Designated NYCL: September 14, 1982

Location
- Interactive map of Washington Bridge

The Washington Bridge is a 2,375-foot-long (724 m) arch bridge over the Harlem River in New York City between the boroughs of Manhattan and the Bronx. The crossing, opened in 1888, connects 181st Street and Amsterdam Avenue in Washington Heights, Manhattan, with University Avenue in Morris Heights, Bronx. It carries six lanes of traffic, as well as sidewalks on both sides. Ramps at either end of the bridge connect to the Trans-Manhattan Expressway and the Cross Bronx Expressway, and serves as a connector/highway to the highway itself.

The two-hinged arch bridge was designed by Charles C. Schneider and Wilhelm Hildenbrand, with modifications to the design made by the Union Bridge Company, William J. McAlpine, Theodore Cooper, and DeLemos & Cordes, with Edward H. Kendall as consulting architect. The bridge features steel-arch construction with two 510-foot (160 m) main arches and masonry approaches. The bridge is operated and maintained by the New York City Department of Transportation. It once carried U.S. Route 1, which since 1963 has traveled over the Alexander Hamilton Bridge. The Washington Bridge is designated as a city landmark by the New York City Landmarks Preservation Commission and is listed on the National Register of Historic Places.

The Washington Bridge had been planned since the 1860s, but progress was delayed for two decades due to various disputes. The final plan was chosen and modified after an architectural design competition in 1885, and work began in July 1886. Pedestrians with passes could use the bridge by December 1888, and the Washington Bridge was being used for regular travel by the next year, though an official opening ceremony never took place. At the Washington Bridge's completion, it was widely praised as an architectural accomplishment of New York City. Automobiles were able to use the bridge after 1906. After the George Washington Bridge across the Hudson River, connecting to New Jersey in the west, was completed in 1931, the Harlem River crossing served as a connector for traffic between New Jersey and the Bronx. The Alexander Hamilton Bridge was completed in 1963, diverting traffic from the Washington Bridge. After a period of deterioration, the Washington Bridge underwent reconstruction from 1989 to 1993.

== Description ==
The Washington Bridge is an arch bridge over the Harlem River, composed of two large steel arches flanked at either end by masonry viaducts. Its total length, including approaches, is 2,375 feet (724 m). It connects West 181st Street in Washington Heights, Manhattan, with University Avenue in Morris Heights, Bronx. Within the bridge's vicinity, the Harlem River is in a valley between Manhattan to the west and the Bronx to the east; the terrain on the Manhattan side is steeper than on the Bronx side.

The bridge was designed by Charles C. Schneider and Wilhelm Hildenbrand, with Edward H. Kendall as consulting architect. Modifications to the design were made by the Union Bridge Company, chief engineer William J. McAlpine, consulting engineer Theodore Cooper, and cornice architect DeLemos & Cordes. Alfred Noble and John Bogart served as resident engineers while Frank A. Leers was engineer for the construction contractors. The construction of the bridge was subcontracted to steel contractor Passaic Rolling Mill Company and masonry contractor Myles Tierney. Work was subcontracted to Anderson and Barr for caissons, John Peirce for granite, Barber Asphalt Paving Company for the roadway, and Spang Steel Works and Union Mills for the steel production. The granite was from Maine, while the light gray gneiss ashlar was from Connecticut. Gneiss from nearby quarries and excavations was also used, as was Rosendale cement. Over 8,000 short tons (7,100 long tons; 7,300 t) of steel was used for the bridge's arches.

The bridge carries six lanes of traffic and a sidewalk on each side. The roadway was originally made of granite, subsequently repaved in asphalt, while the sidewalks were made of bluestone. As built, the bridge deck was 80 feet (24 m) wide, with a roadway of 50 feet (15 m) and sidewalks of 15 feet (4.6 m). The modern crossing contains sidewalks of 6 feet (1.8 m), as well as two 30-foot-wide (9.1 m) roadways separated by a median. The Washington Bridge carries the Bx3, Bx11, Bx13, Bx35 and Bx36 bus routes, operated by New York City Bus. In 2016, the New York City Department of Transportation, which operates and maintains the bridge, reported an average daily traffic volume in both directions of 57,647. The peak ADT over the Washington Bridge was 68,075 vehicles in 2000.

=== Over-river span ===
The two main steel arches of the bridge are each 510 feet (160 m) long. The western arch traverses the Harlem River as well as Bridge Park on the Bronx shore. The eastern arch crosses the Metro-North Railroad's Hudson Line and the Major Deegan Expressway (carrying Interstate 87). The arches provide 134 feet (41 m) of vertical clearance at Mean High Water.

==== Arches ====
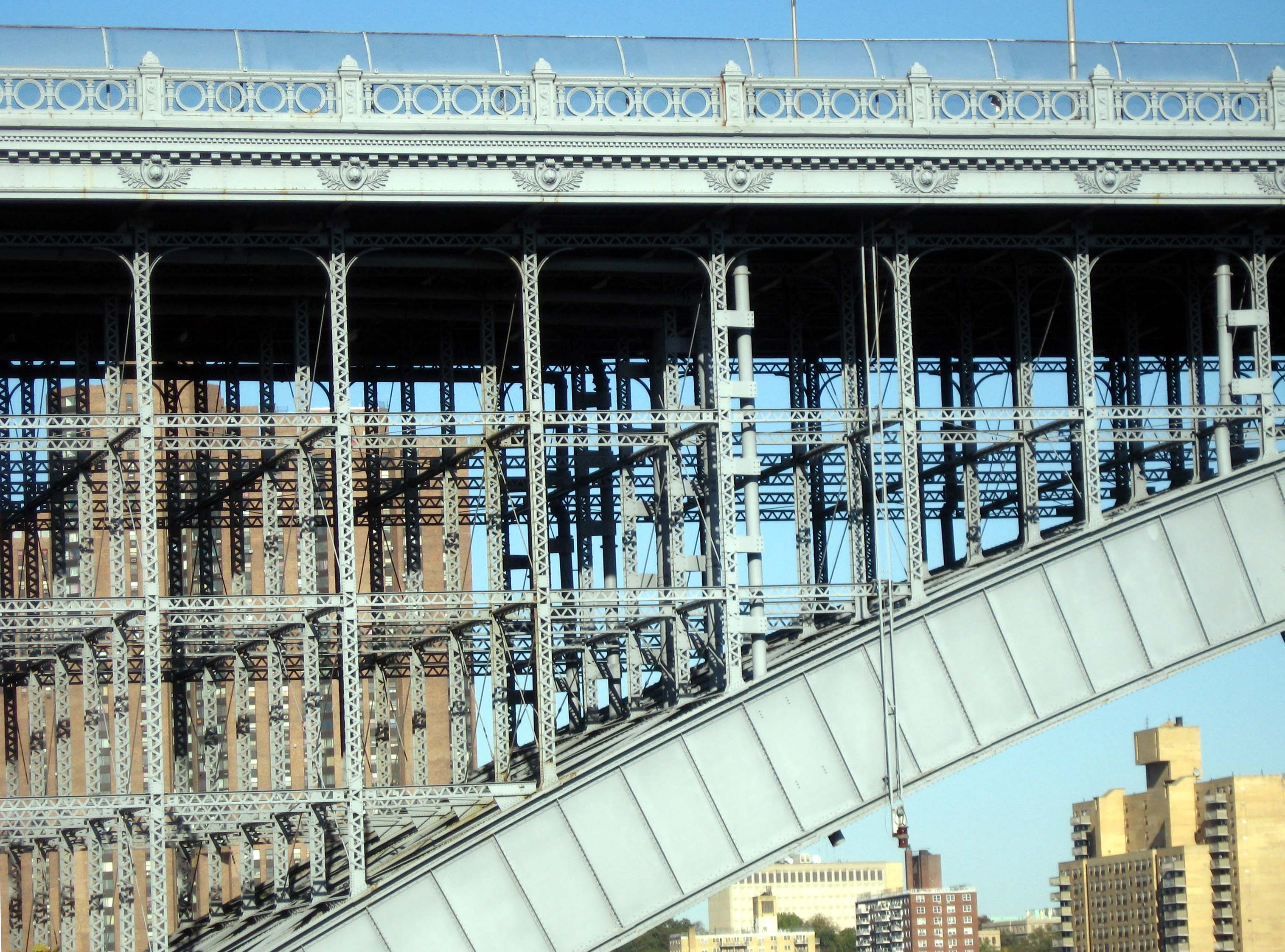
Horizontal and vertical beams between the deck (top) and arches' girders (bottom right)

Each of the arches consists of six large girders made of riveted steel beams, with heavy chords at the top and bottom. The ribs are 13 feet (4.0 m) thick, with minor variations because of the varying thicknesses of the plates that were used in the beams. The ribs run parallel to each other and are spaced 14 feet (4.3 m) apart. The ribs are riveted together with both diagonal and perpendicular bracing. This made the Washington Bridge the first in the United States where the ribs of the arch were made of plate girders. Because the ribs were riveted, the bridge was classified by architectural writer Carl W. Condit as a two-hinged arch bridge.

Unusually for arch bridges of the time, the deck lacks diagonal bracing, instead being supported by beams running horizontally and vertically. The beams, spaced about 15 feet (4.6 m) apart, are built of plates and angles. Posts extend from the extrados of the ribs, supporting the floor beams. The posts are rigidly attached to the ribs' flanges and the horizontal and vertical beams; they are connected and braced transversely.

The sides of the deck are flanked by cornices with denticulation and modillions. There are shield and branch motifs below the cornice, as well as decorative balustrade poles with shell and seahorse motifs above each shield. The balustrade contains egg-and-dart motifs on their top rails, as well as alternating Ionic columns and decorative torch-and-scroll medallions between each decorative pole. Chain-link fences run atop the original barricades.

==== Piers ====
The arches sit between three main piers: one on either end, adjacent to the masonry approach viaducts, as well as one between the arches on the eastern bank of the Harlem River. At the skewbacks, from which the arches rise, the main piers are 40 feet (12 m) wide and 98 feet (30 m) long. The sections of piers above each skewback are made of vertical "cells" and rise nearly 100 feet (30 m) to the bottom of the bridge deck. The interiors of the piers are made of rubble masonry, although the center and eastern piers also contain concrete. The sections of piers below each skewback are solid, made of concrete, and clad with ashlar.

A balustrade of solid granite sits atop each of the piers, surrounding balconies that protrude from either sidewalk. The balconies atop each pier once supported illuminated seating areas with lampposts made of cast bronze.

=== Approaches ===
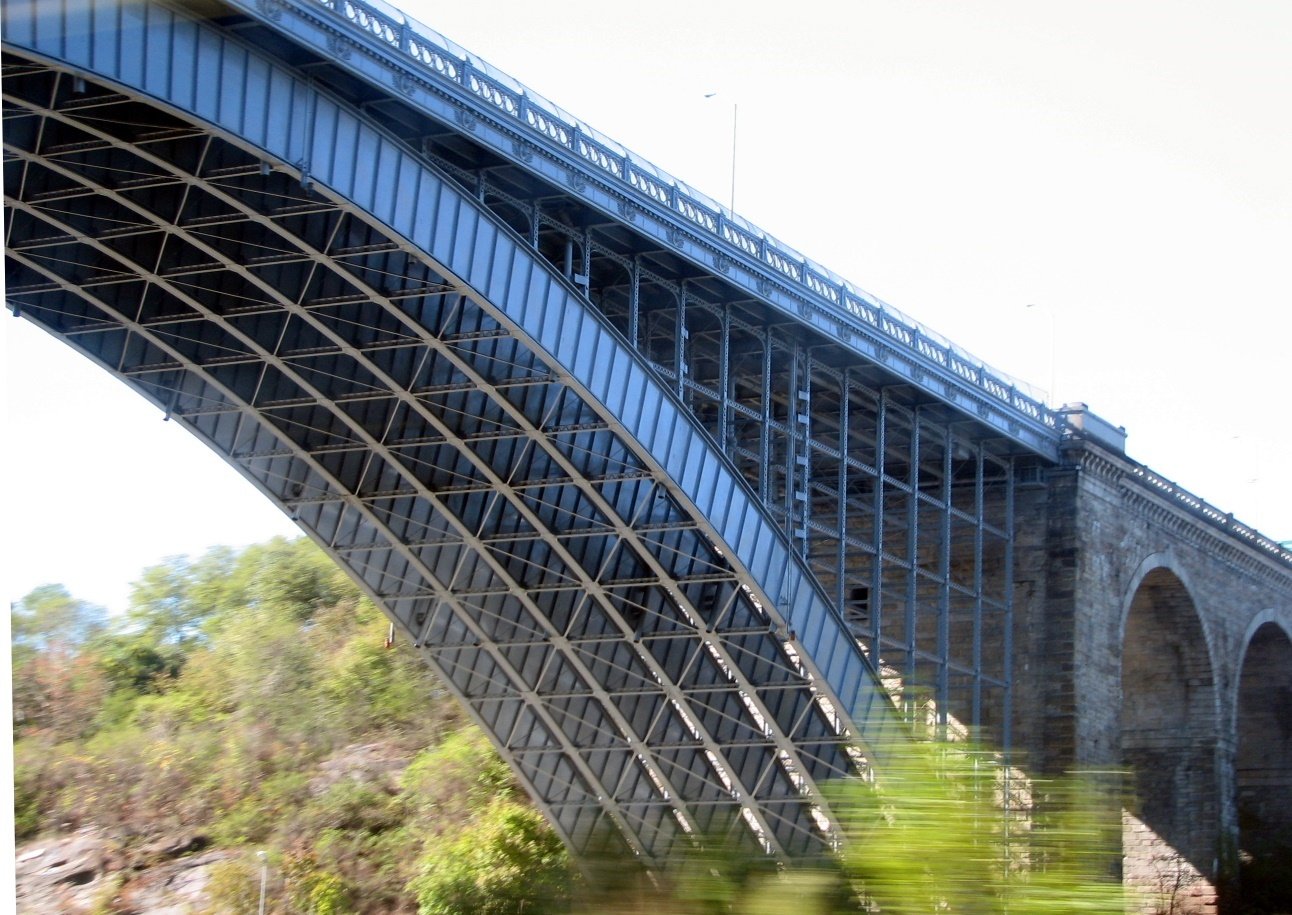
Looking toward the masonry viaducts at the Manhattan end, with the steel arch above the Harlem River in the foreground

The masonry approach viaducts at either end both contain three semicircular concrete arches, clad in granite and gneiss ashlar. There is a seventh, elliptical arch over Undercliff Avenue on the Bronx side of the bridge. The centers for all seven arches were all erected simultaneously to provide structural stability. There are voussoirs running along the tops of these arches, with keystones at the center of each arch. Each of the semicircular arches are 60 feet (18 m) wide and are carried by piers that are 13 feet (4.0 m) thick. The tops of the viaducts contain granite balustrades with circular openings, which rest atop short granite cornices with brackets. When the bridge opened, the circular openings of these balustrades included fleur-de-lis ornaments made in bronze. The approach viaducts also originally contained lampposts made of cast bronze.

At the western end of the Washington Bridge, there are ramps to and from the Trans-Manhattan Expressway, carrying Interstate 95 and U.S. Route 9. The approach viaduct crosses Harlem River Drive, which runs along the western shore of the Harlem River. The bridge's main roadway continues west to the intersection of 181st Street and Amsterdam Avenue (formerly Tenth Avenue), adjacent to Highbridge Park. The distance between the end of the masonry approach and the intersection with Amsterdam Avenue is 200 feet (61 m). The intersection is 27 feet (8.2 m) higher than the bridge deck, necessitating a 3.5 percent upward slope. The entrance to the northern sidewalk is in McNally Plaza, slightly northeast of the intersection of 181st Street and Amsterdam Avenue. The entrance to the southern sidewalk is from the southeastern corner of the intersection.

The Bronx approach viaduct contains three semicircular arches, as well as an elliptical arch with a width of 56 feet (17 m). Along this approach, a grass median strip once separated the westbound and eastbound lanes. In the original design, there was a granite staircase with bluestone steps, which led to Boscobel Place just south of the bridge. At the eastern end of the bridge, the westbound and eastbound lanes diverge from each other and merge with the Cross Bronx Expressway (I-95 and US 1). A pair of entrance and exit ramps lead to an interchange with University Avenue; the eastbound exit also provides access to Edward L. Grant Highway, which diverges from University Avenue to the south. (Note: The section of University Avenue north of the bridge is a major road and is continuous with Edward L. Grant Highway. South of the bridge, University Avenue is a minor street. The bridge exit contains a ramp to the southern section of University Avenue, as well as another ramp to Edward L. Grant Highway and the northern section of University Avenue. The bridge entrance is accessible from Edward L. Grant Highway and University Avenue's northern section, but not from University Avenue's southern section.) The entrance and exit ramps to University Avenue also carry the northern and southern sidewalks; the southern sidewalk abuts Bridge Playground. There was originally a 3.5 percent downward slope from the deck to the bridge terminus at University Avenue. (Note: Older sources refer to the terminus as being at Aqueduct Avenue; that street became University Avenue in 1913.) The distance between the end of the masonry approach and the intersection with University Avenue was 300 feet (91 m).

== History ==
=== Planning ===
==== Early plans ====
Planning for a bridge carrying pedestrians and transit between the West Bronx and Washington Heights, in Upper Manhattan, dates to the 1860s. The nearby High Bridge, which had been completed in the 1840s, carried the Croton Aqueduct. A crossing slightly north of the High Bridge was first proposed by Andrew Haswell Green, a member of Central Park's board of commissioners. The board had been tasked, in 1868, with laying out streets in Upper Manhattan. Green had suggested constructing bridges and tunnels across the Harlem River between Manhattan and the Bronx, the latter of which was then in Westchester County. He specifically desired a suspension bridge to be built about 1/4 mile (0.40 km) north of the High Bridge, with a deck slightly higher than the High Bridge's. That crossing was authorized by the New York State Legislature in 1869, and the New York City Department of Public Parks received authority to plan and build bridges across the Harlem River the next year. No further progress was made for several years. The city contemplated widening the High Bridge so that horse-drawn carriages could use that bridge, but ultimately decided against it.

The New York Supreme Court appointed a group of commissioners in February 1876 to acquire land for the bridge. The commissioners condemned a strip of land 100 feet (30 m) wide between Tenth (now Amsterdam) Avenue in Manhattan and Aqueduct Avenue in Westchester (now University Avenue in the Bronx). Two years later, several prominent men signed a memorial urging the construction of a suspension bridge slightly north of the High Bridge, which if built would help alleviate the growing traffic between Manhattan and Westchester. In February 1881, Department of Public Parks chief engineer William J. McAlpine presented four alternative bridge designs: a suspension bridge with half-suspension approaches, a suspension bridge with masonry approaches, an iron cantilever bridge, and a masonry-arch viaduct. In each of these plans, the deck was to be 50 feet (15 m) wide, with two sidewalks flanking a 35-foot-wide (11 m) carriageway. The masonry-arch design was recommended as more monumental and durable, but no further progress was made on that plan. The Parks Department received other plans for cantilever and arch bridges in 1883.

==== Bridge commission and design competition ====
As the Parks Department had made no progress on the Harlem River bridge in fifteen years, Andrew Green requested that another agency be tasked with the bridge's construction. The New York State Legislature finally transferred authority to a new Harlem River Bridge Commission in June 1885 under Chapter 487 of the Laws of 1885. The bill called for the appointment of three commissioners, although mayor William Russell Grace delayed the selection of these commissioners for a month, believing the bridge's cost to be excessive. Vernon H. Brown, Jacob Lorillard, and David James King were named as the commissioners in July, while McAlpine was named as the chief engineer that September.

The commissioners decided to host an architectural design competition for the new bridge, which they hoped would rival the then-new Brooklyn Bridge in stature. The competition was advertised in October 1885. The submissions were required to include an over-river crossing at least 400 feet (120 m) long, a metal superstructure, masonry piers, and an 80-foot-wide (24 m) deck. In December 1885, the commissioners received 17 designs, selecting four for further examination. The Union Bridge Company presented plans for a bridge with three granite-faced arches, each 208 feet (63 m) long. The Commission had wished to accept the proposal, but the company withdrew it when the Commission questioned the legality under the provisions of the 1885 legislation of using "artificial stone" for the bridge's structural elements. The Commission nonetheless believed it would be satisfactory, but neither side wished to undertake the expense and delay of a formal legal determination. The commissioners also rejected the idea of an all-masonry bridge, instead choosing a metal and stone hybrid.

A board of experts were appointed to select the competition's winners. The first prize was awarded in March 1886 to Charles Conrad Schneider and the second prize to Wilhelm Hildenbrand. Schneider's plan was deemed too costly; the proposal, assessed at $3 million (equivalent to $107 million in 2025), brought criticism from the New-York Tribune. McAlpine requested Julius W. Adams to prepare a plan for a bridge of masonry, although it would fail to meet the terms of the competition. The Union Bridge Company presented a modified plan combining Schneider's and Hildenbrand's proposals, with steel ribs made of solid webs, although it was also rejected by the commission. The company then submitted a plan that used steel plate girders, which the commission accepted after McAlpine and Cooper modified it.

=== Construction ===
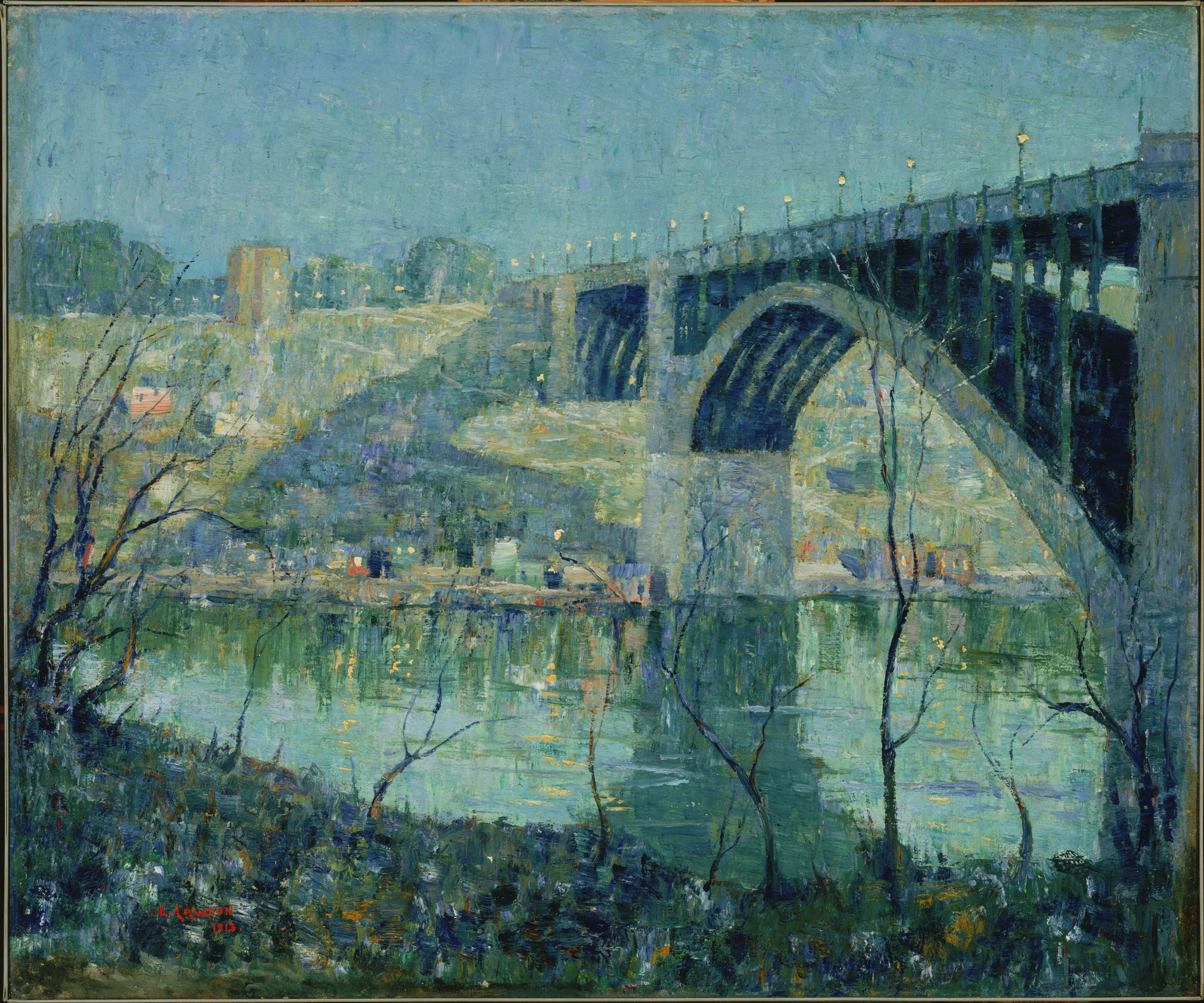
The bridge was depicted in Ernest Lawson's painting Spring Night (1913).

In April 1886, the commissioners received bids for the masonry and metalwork. The commissioners wished for one contractor to oversee all work, so all the bids by specialist contractors were rejected. On July 14, 1886, the commissioners awarded a general construction contract to steel contractor Passaic Rolling Mill Company and masonry contractor Myles Tierney. The same month construction began, McAlpine resigned as chief engineer and William Rich Hutton was appointed in his place. After work was begun, the plans were changed to include a cornice made by Jackson Architectural Iron Works, designed by DeLemos & Cordes. The project involved over 500 workers in total. During construction, the crossing was known as the Manhattan Bridge; it was also known during planning as the New Harlem Bridge or the Boscobel Bridge, the latter after a landowner on the Manhattan side.

The builders leased land on both banks of the Harlem River so material could be delivered and stored. Because the western bank of the river contains a sharp bluff, the materials for the western bank were delivered in small quantities or stored on the eastern bank. A wharf with derricks and tracks was built, and a single-track inclined plane was constructed from the wharf to the western end of the approach viaduct. A hoisting engine, at the top of the incline, lifted materials to the work site, where derricks moved material from the truck directly into place. Another wharf was built on the east bank of the river, and a 12-foot-deep (3.7 m) channel from both wharves was dredged 1,500 feet (460 m) south to the High Bridge. Material from the east wharf was initially hauled to its place by wagons. In early 1886, a trestle platform with tracks was installed between the eastern wharf and Sedgwick Avenue, which runs close to the coastline.

The layer of bedrock under the Harlem River Manhattan Bridge's westernmost large pier was close to the ground, and it was ready for masonry by October 1886. The foundation of the central pier was built upon a timber caisson, to be sunk by compressed air; work on the caisson began in September 1886. The caisson was sunk to the underlying bedrock, which ranged between 17 and 40 feet (5.2 and 12.2 m) beneath mean high water. The caisson was sunk starting in November 1886 and had reached its final depth six months later, after which masonry work began. A similar caisson was sunk for the eastern pier, near Sedgwick Avenue, and masonry work on that pier began in October 1886. Work progressed with little interruption, other than a one-day work stoppage, as well as cold weather in early 1887 that delayed work on the superstructure. By mid-1887, the piers were nearly completed and more than half the required steel had been cast.

The arches were constructed on falsework. Construction on the frames of the masonry arches was commenced in September 1887 and they were all enclosed by early 1888. The eastern metal arch across the railroad tracks was fabricated from September to December 1887, and installed in January 1888. This was followed two months later by the installation of the western arch above the river. On average, two hundred men were involved in the installation of the main arches between September 1887 and May 1888. Both the main arches and the approaches required extensive scaffolding. The rubble-masonry interior walls of the approach viaducts were installed between April and July 1888. By the beginning of that July, the deck was nearly completed. The roadway and sidewalks were laid from August to November of the same year. Overall, the bridge cost $2.85 million to construct, equivalent to $102,125,000 in 2025.

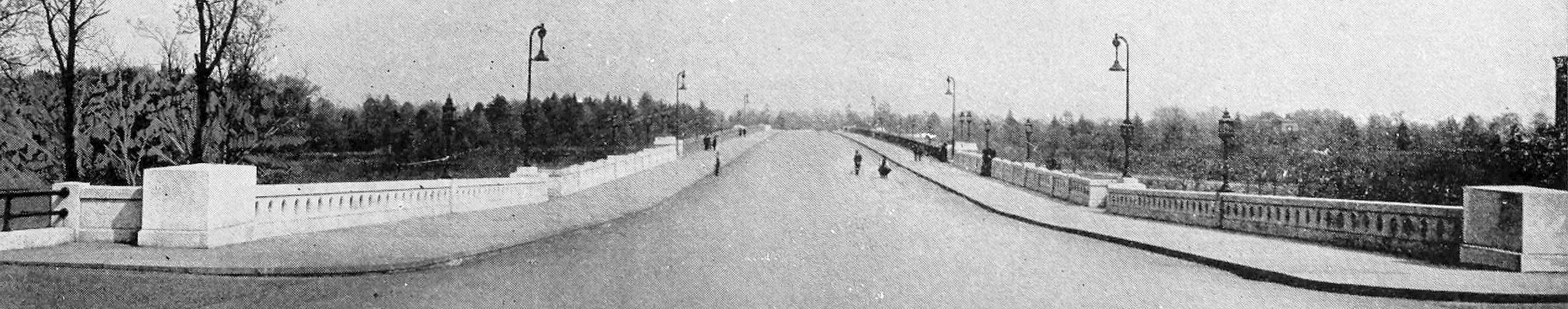
Entrance to the bridge from Manhattan, seen in 1898

=== Opening and early years ===
Work on the Harlem River Manhattan Bridge was substantially completed in December 1888, and pedestrians with special passes were allowed to informally use it. The crossing was turned over to the Harlem River Bridge Commission, which voted to name it after president George Washington in February 1889 in honor of his birthday and the centennial of his inauguration. The Washington Bridge's new name also reflected the fact that the nearby Washington Heights and Fort Washington were also named after him. The proposed opening date in February was postponed because of bad weather. That March, a horse and buggy became the first vehicle to cross the bridge. At the time, only pedestrians were allowed to cross, but the vehicle's driver deceived guards at the bridge's entrance in letting him cross with his pedestrian-only pass. The Hudson River Bridge Commission took ownership of the completed bridge the same month, although the bridge remained closed due to legal disputes.

By the first week of May 1889, the Evening World reported that pedestrians and vehicles had been using the Washington Bridge for a week. Ultimately, the bridge never formally opened because of disagreement between the city and the bridge commission. In December 1889, members of the public decided to tear down the barricades that had barred access to the bridge. When the first person jumped to his death from the Washington Bridge in August 1890, The New York Times reported that the bridge had been in use for eighteen months. However, as late as 1891, the bridge was still recorded as being "unopened" because of disputes over maintenance.

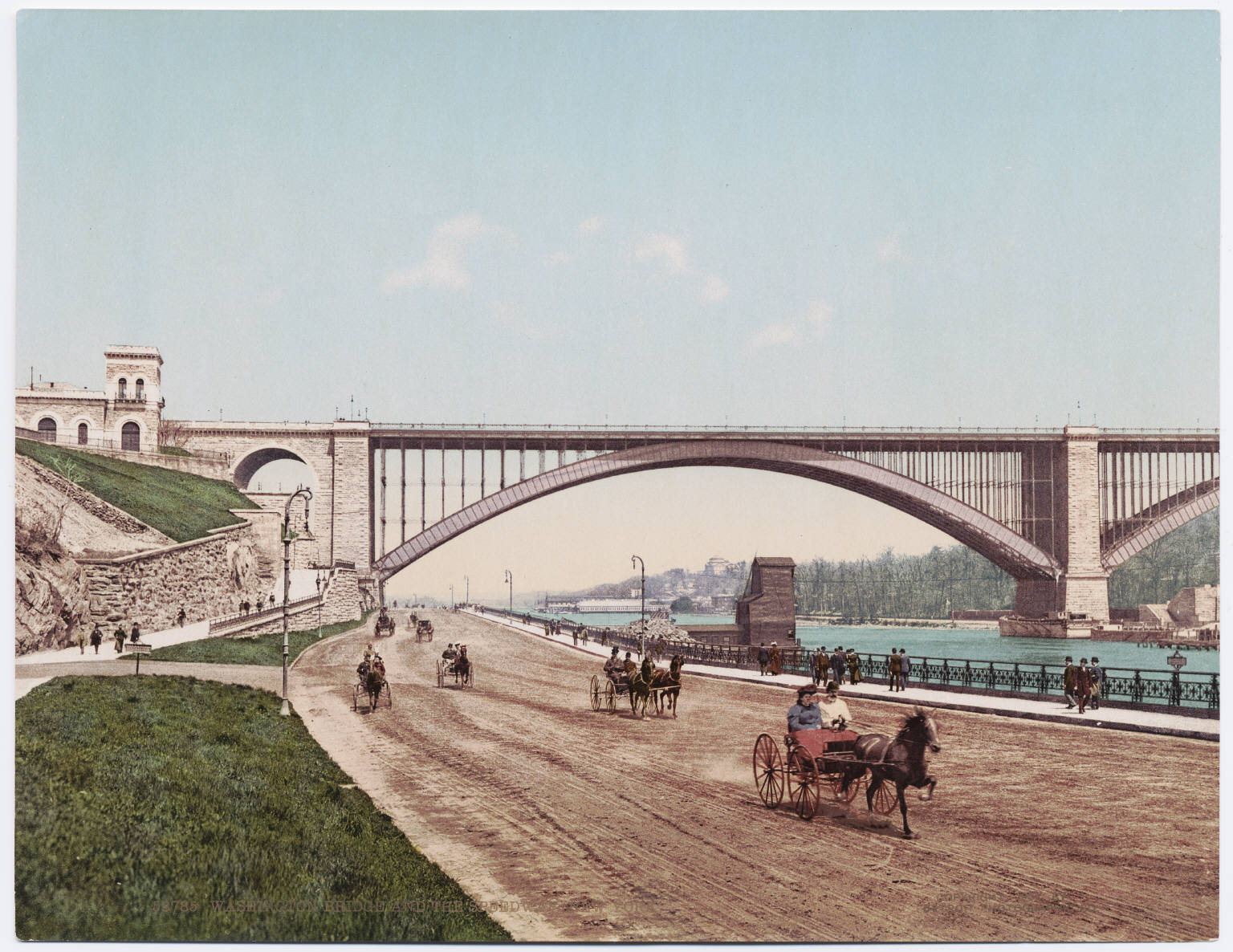
Washington Bridge and Harlem River Speedway, early 20th century

The Interborough Railway Company announced plans in 1902 to operate a network of streetcar lines in the Bronx, including a line across the Washington Bridge and 181st Street. After some dispute, the company received a franchise for a 181st Street streetcar line in 1904. The Washington Bridge was opened to automobile and streetcar traffic two years later on May 31, 1906, with two tracks for the Interborough Railway Company. The tracks were ultimately used by four Bronx streetcar routes: the Ogden Avenue, 167th Street, 181st Street, and University Avenue routes (now respectively the Bx13, Bx35, Bx36, and Bx3 buses). By the 1910s, West 181st Street in Manhattan was seeing rapid growth because of the streetcar routes over the bridge, as well as because of the opening of the New York City Subway's 181st Street station.

=== Crosstown connector ===
Vehicular traffic along the Washington Bridge grew over the years and, by 1928, the city's Department of Plant and Structures was studying a plan to reduce the width of the sidewalks to make space for additional vehicular lanes. The next year, the department requested $300,000 to widen the bridge (equivalent to $5.63 million in 2025) in conjunction with the construction of a suspension bridge over the Hudson River from the west side of Manhattan to New Jersey. A contract for the work was awarded to Poirier and McLane in November 1929, which entailed widening the roadway by 14 feet (4.3 m) and moving the trolley tracks. The work was expected to take about one year. The crossing of the Hudson River was subsequently named the George Washington Bridge, prompting concern that the bridges could be confused. The chairman of the Port Authority of New York and New Jersey, which controlled the George Washington Bridge, defended the decision by saying that the Washington Bridge over the Harlem River was often called the 181st Street Bridge. After the George Washington Bridge opened in late 1931, traffic between New Jersey and the Bronx used local streets between the two bridges until the 178th Street Tunnel opened from Amsterdam Avenue to the George Washington Bridge in 1940. The Washington Bridge over the Harlem River was signed as part of U.S. Route 1 in New York in mid-December 1934.

Most streetcar service was withdrawn from the Washington Bridge in October 1947 and replaced by bus service, with only the 167th Street streetcar remaining. That route was replaced with bus service the following July. Work on a widening of the Washington Bridge began in June 1949. The streetcar tracks were removed, and a median barrier was built between the two directions of traffic, creating two 30-foot-wide (9.1 m) granite roadways with three lanes. To make way for the widened roadways, the granite sidewalks were narrowed. Work also began on the 179th Street Tunnel, paralleling the congested 178th Street Tunnel, as well as on the Highbridge Interchange, which included direct ramps from the Harlem River Washington Bridge to the 178th–179th Street Tunnels. The widening was finished by 1950, and the tunnel and interchange opened on May 5, 1952.

=== Mid-20th century to present ===
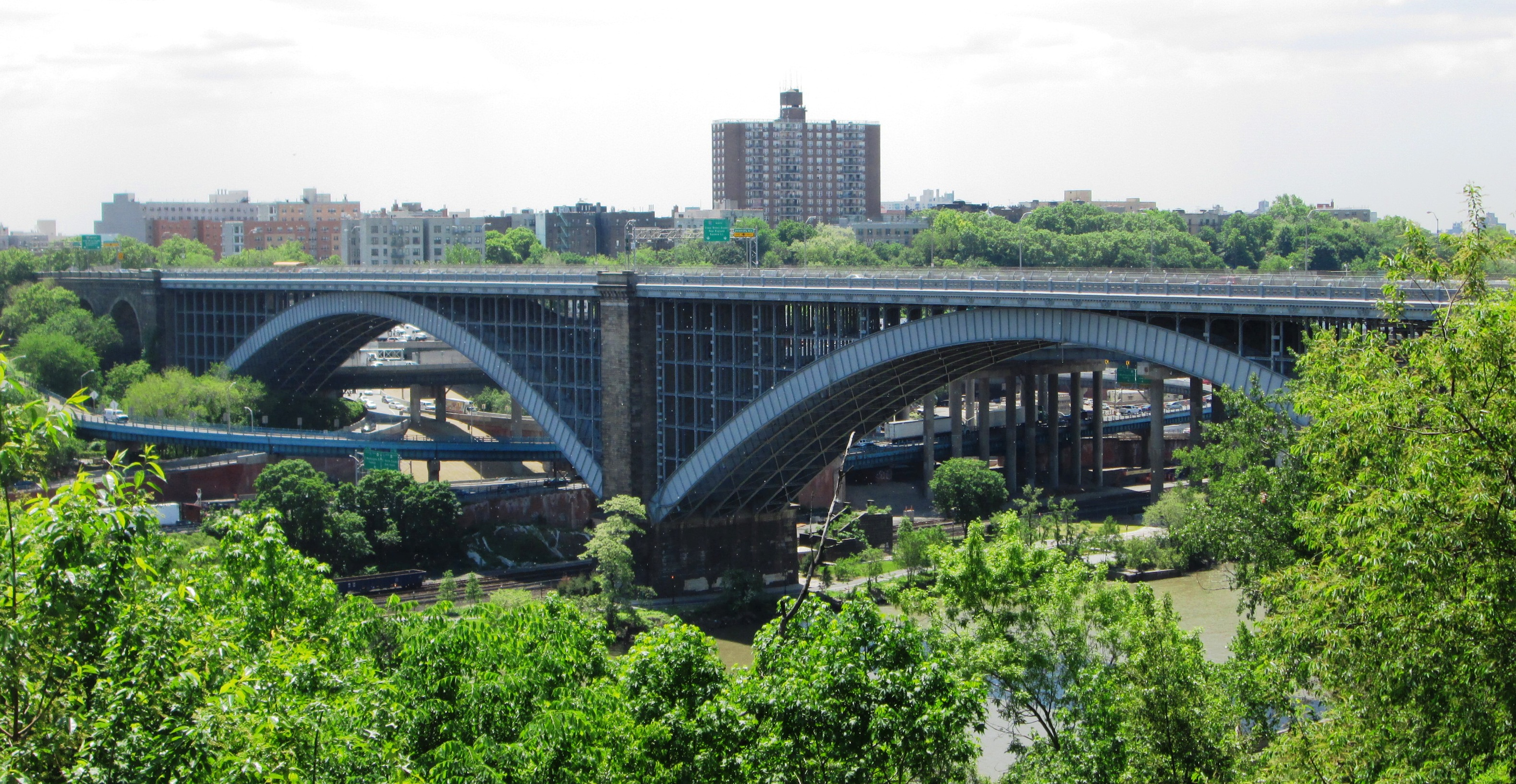
Seen from Manhattan

The Harlem River Washington Bridge continued to be a bottleneck for crosstown traffic. In 1955, city planner Robert Moses conducted the Joint Study of Arterial Facilities, which recommended additional highways to relieve traffic across New York City, including a bridge parallel to the Washington Bridge. Accordingly, the Alexander Hamilton Bridge and Trans-Manhattan Expressway were respectively planned as bypasses for the Washington Bridge and the 178th–179th Street Tunnels. These projects would connect the Bronx and New Jersey directly via the Interstate Highway System, accommodating increased traffic in construction with the addition of a lower level to the George Washington Bridge. The expressway and bridge's lower deck opened in 1962. The completion of the Alexander Hamilton Bridge in April 1963 resulted in traffic decreases on the Washington Bridge. U.S. 1 was rerouted to the Alexander Hamilton Bridge.

Mayor John Lindsay proposed enacting tolls along the University Heights Bridge, as well as all other free bridges across the East and Harlem rivers, in 1971. The proposal failed in 1977 after the United States Congress moved to ban tolls on these bridges. The Washington Bridge was designated a New York City landmark on September 14, 1982, and was added to the National Register of Historic Places on September 22, 1983. Throughout that decade, the bridge deteriorated. By 1988, the New York City Department of Transportation (NYCDOT) estimated that it would cost $25 million to fix the Washington Bridge. At the time, the deck contained several holes and four of six lanes were closed. The centennial of the bridge's opening was celebrated on April 29, 1989. The Washington Bridge underwent a $33 million reconstruction starting that October, which included replacing the deck, steel, sidewalk, and railings. During the work, some lanes were kept open for traffic. The work was completed in 1993.

Further bridge rehabilitation was undertaken in early 2022. That November, the NYCDOT proposed converting the outermost lane on the Bronx-bound roadway into a bus lane, and it proposed converting the outermost Manhattan-bound lane into a two-way protected bike lane. The bike lane was not open in May 2024 when a cyclist was killed while crossing the bridge. The new lanes were completed in September 2024, connecting to existing bike and bus lanes on either side of the bridge. The bike lane was physically separated from the existing roadway via a barrier.

== Critical reception ==
At the Washington Bridge's completion it was widely praised as an architectural accomplishment of New York City. Cosmopolitan, Scientific American, and The New York Sun respectively called the bridge an "adornment", an "ornament", and "a great work worthy of the city". Architectural critic Montgomery Schuyler characterized the bridge as "an admirable and exemplary work" in 1900, although he had a minor concern about the masonry approaches, which he called "less than adequate architecturally for want of the emphasis". Schuyler subsequently wrote that, although the arch had been modified to appear as though it was a conventional design, "neither is there any question of the attractiveness [...] of the Washington and the old High Bridge". Charles Evan Fowler, an engineer, wrote in 1929 that he thought the Washington Bridge to be "in many respects one of the finest pieces of bridge architecture in the world". Furthermore, Ernest Lawson depicted the bridge as the main subject of his 1913 painting Spring Night.

== Name confusion ==
After the George Washington Bridge over the Hudson River opened, there was some confusion between the two bridges, which intensified over time as the Hudson River bridge became better known. David W. Dunlap wrote for The New York Times in 1985, "Just the existence of another prominent bridge by that name surprises even native New Yorkers, some of whom have wondered for years why the Hudson River crossing insistently carries the extra burden of 'George.'"

== See also ==
- List of crossings of the Harlem River
- List of bridges documented by the Historic American Engineering Record in New York (state)
- List of New York City Designated Landmarks in Manhattan above 110th Street
- List of New York City Designated Landmarks in the Bronx
- National Register of Historic Places listings in Manhattan above 110th Street
- National Register of Historic Places listings in the Bronx
