= Bx3 (New York City bus) =

Bus route in New York City

bx3
- University Avenue Line
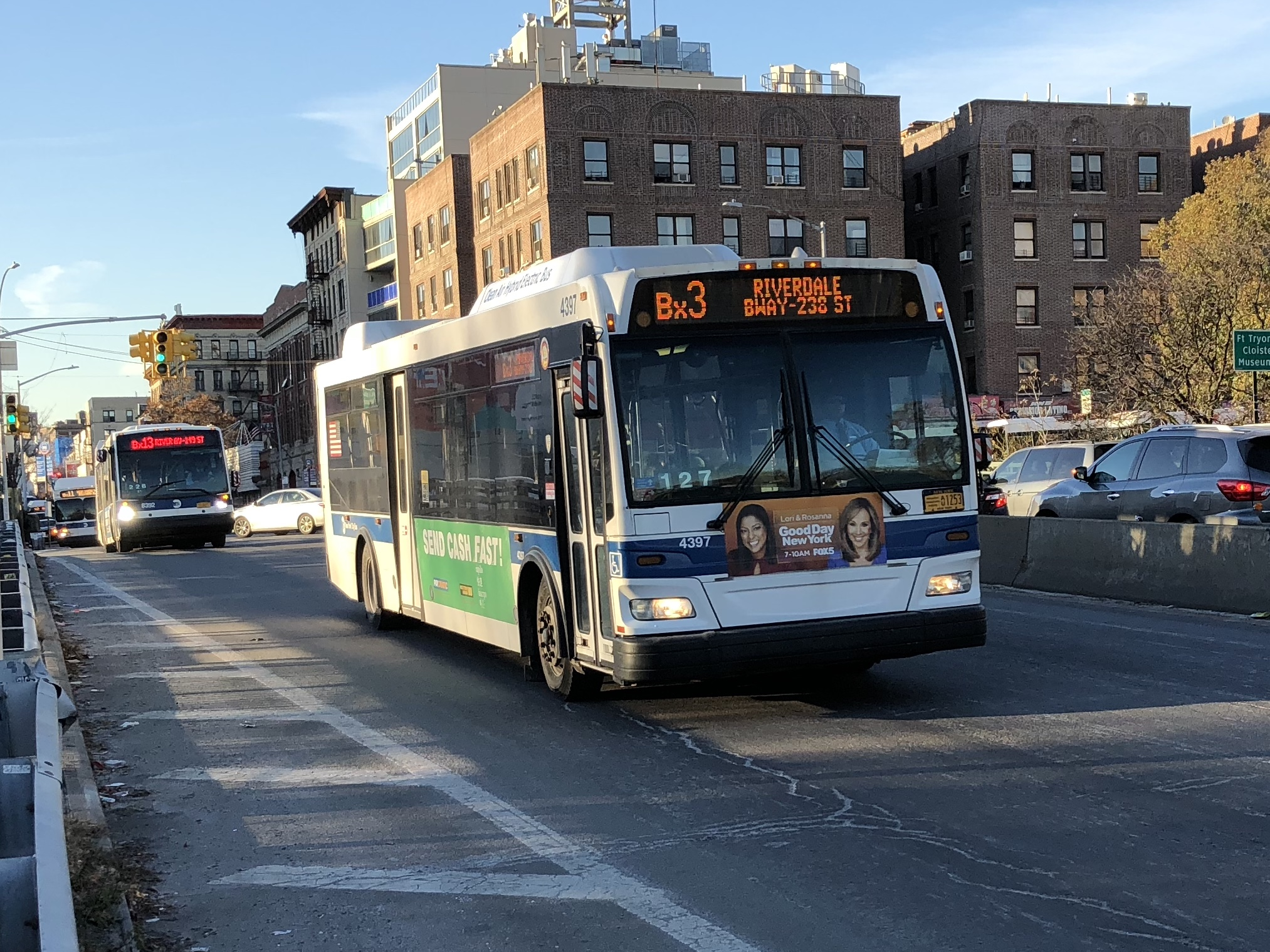
- A 2009 Orion VII NG HEV (4397) on the Riverdale-bound Bx3 on Washington Bridge

Overview
- System: MTA Regional Bus Operations
- Operator: Manhattan and Bronx Surface Transit Operating Authority
- Garage: Kingsbridge Depot
- Vehicle: Nova Bus LFS; Nova Bus LFS HEV; Nova Bus LFSe+

Route
- Locale: The Bronx and Manhattan
- Communities served: Washington Heights, Morris Heights, University Heights, Kingsbridge Heights, Kingsbridge
- Start: Kingsbridge – 238th Street station
- Via: West 181st Street, University Avenue, Sedgwick Avenue
- End: Washington Heights – George Washington Bridge Bus Station Broadway & West 179th Street
- Length: 4.4 miles (7.1 km)
- Other routes: Bx11 170th/East 174th Sts; Bx13 Ogden/River Avs; Bx35 E.L. Grant Hwy/East 167th/169th Sts; Bx36 Tremont Av/White Plains Rd
- Annual patronage: 2,105,366 (2025)
- Transfers: Yes
- Timetable: Bx3

The Bx3 bus constitutes the University Avenue Line public transit line in The Bronx and Manhattan, operating between Washington Heights, Manhattan at Broadway & 179th Street, and Kingsbridge, Bronx, at 238th Street station on the 1 line. It operates mainly via University Avenue, serving the West Bronx and Upper Manhattan.

== Current route ==
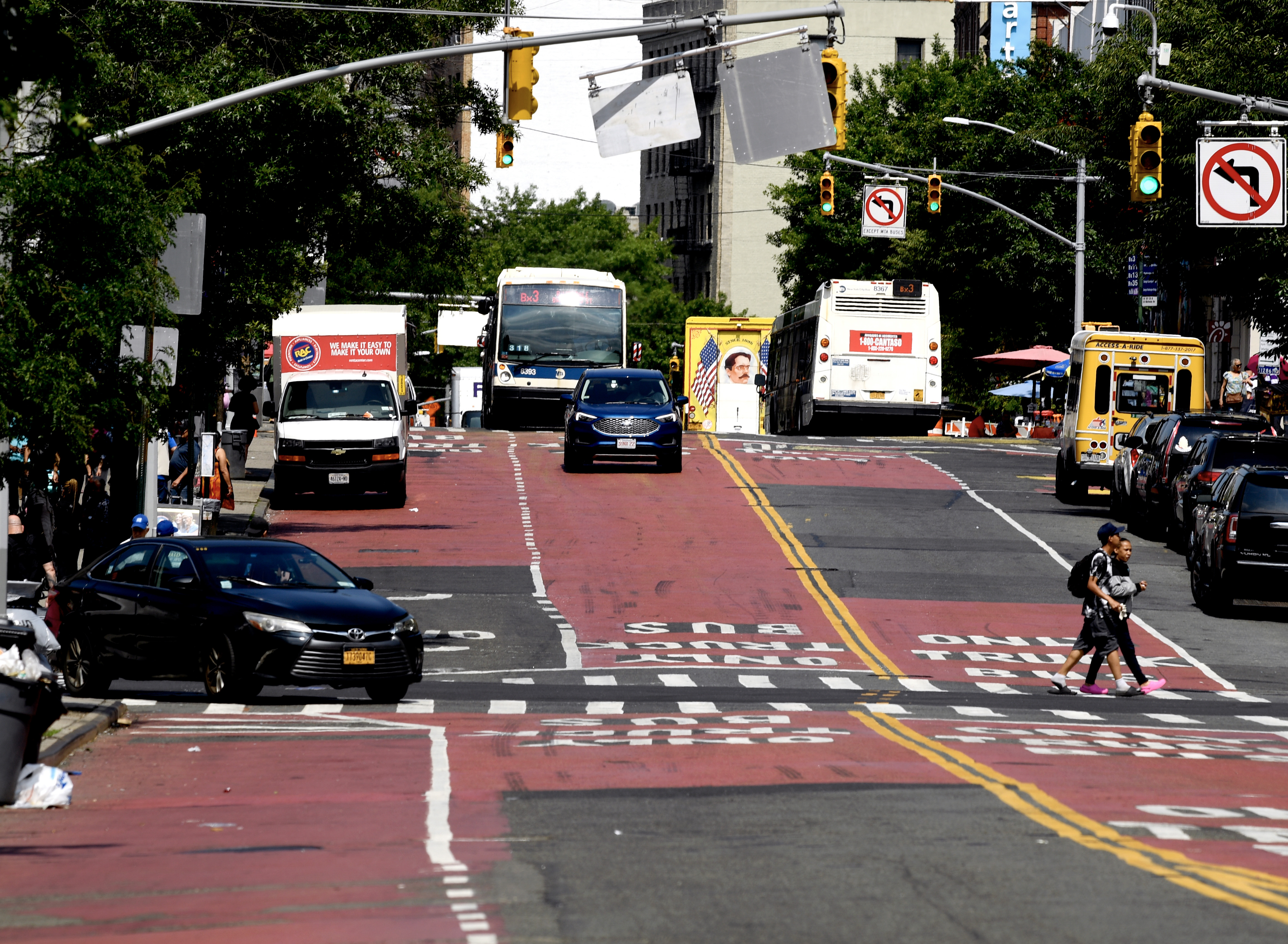
Two Nova Bus LFSs: one 2015 (8367) and one 2016 (8393) on the Bx3 on the 181st Street Busway

The Bx3 starts with the Bx11, Bx13, Bx35 and Bx36 buses at 179th Street in Washington Heights, Manhattan. It then uses 181st Street to access the Washington Bridge, which it uses to get to The Bronx. Immediately after the bridge, it turns onto University Avenue, which it continues on until Kingsbridge Road, serving Morris Heights and University Heights. After doing a dogleg turn onto Sedgwick Avenue, it passes through the Kingsbridge Heights neighborhood, before using 238th Street to its terminus at Broadway.

=== School trippers ===
When school is in session, two extra southbound trips originate at a school complex at Sedgwick Avenue & West 231st Street and depart at 2:40 and 2:45pm.

== History ==
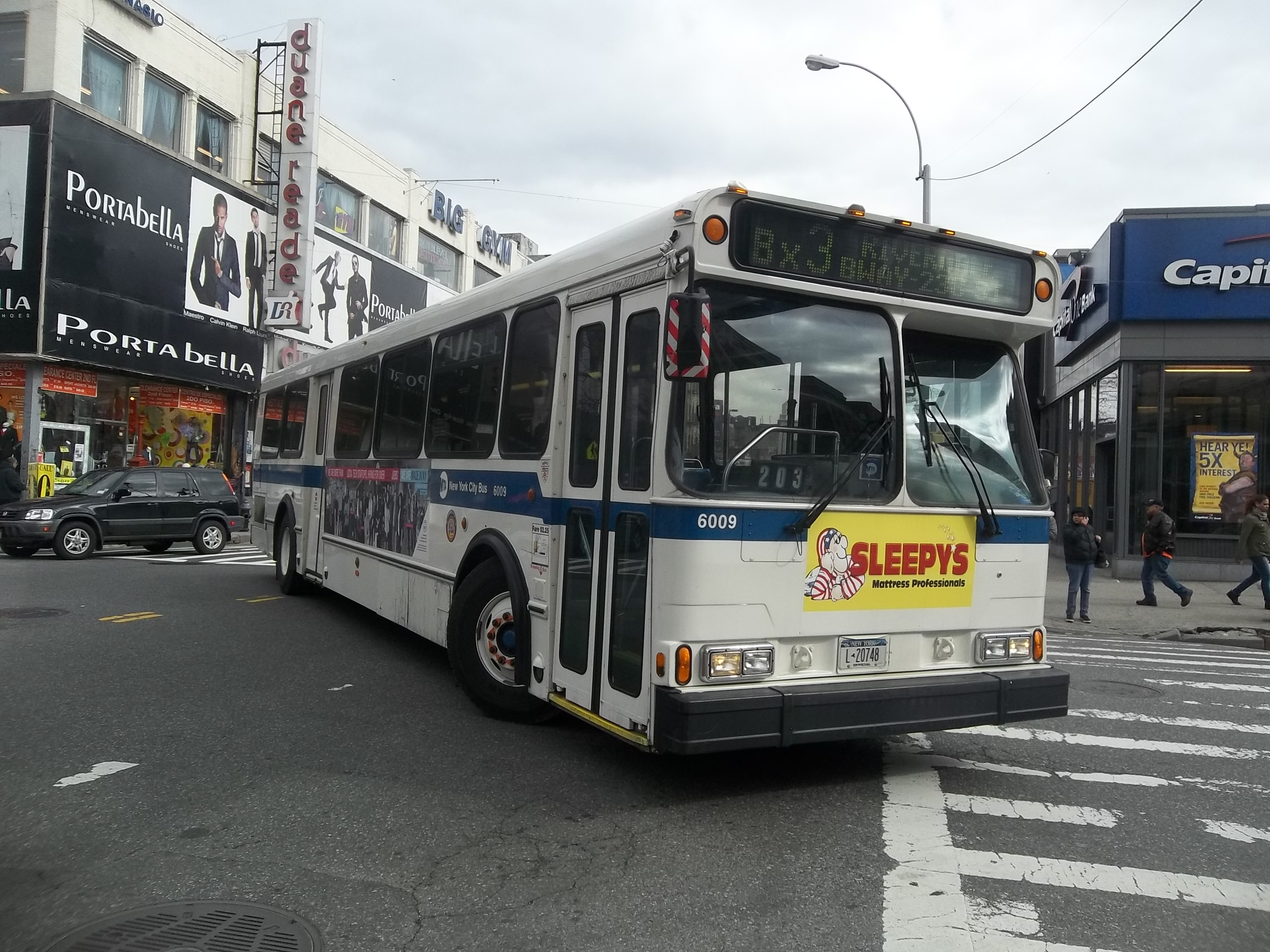
A 1999 Orion V (6009) on the Riverdale-bound Bx3

Buses replaced University Avenue Line streetcars on October 25, 1947, operating as the Bx38. The route was renamed to the Bx3, and extended from 181st Street to 179th Street in September 1985. Until 1995, late night service terminated at Kingsbridge Road, it was extended to 238th Street in 1995.
