= Bx36 (New York City bus) =

Bus route in New York City

bx36 bx36
- Tremont Avenue Line; Washington Heights-Soundview/Castle Hill
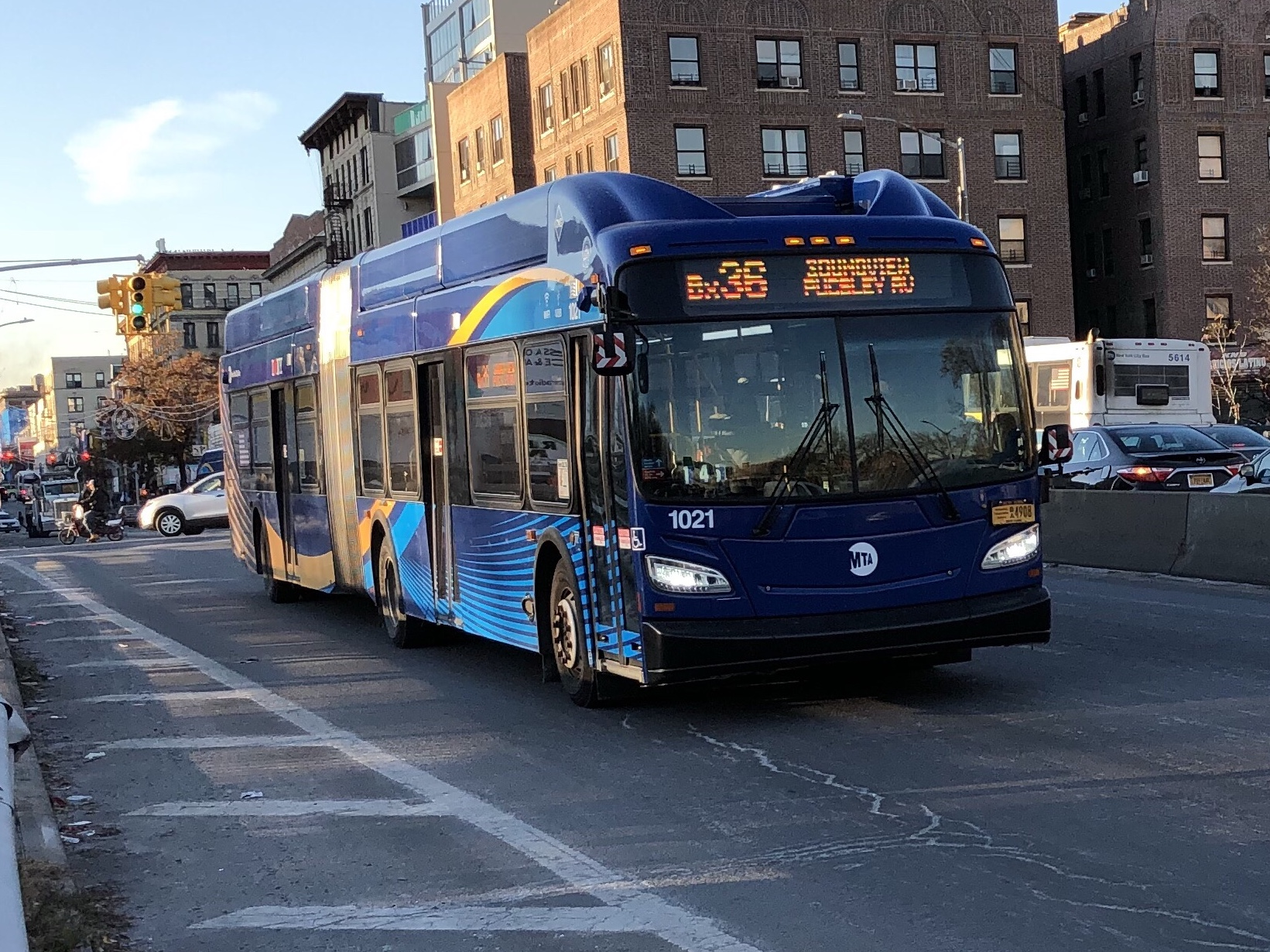
- A 2018 XN60 (1021) on the Soundview-bound Bx36 at Washington Bridge

Overview
- System: MTA Regional Bus Operations
- Operator: Manhattan and Bronx Surface Transit Operating Authority
- Garage: West Farms Depot
- Vehicle: New Flyer Xcelsior XN60; New Flyer Xcelsior XD60; Nova Bus LFS articulated (main vehicles); New Flyer C40LF; New Flyer Xcelsior XN40; New Flyer Xcelsior XD40; Nova Bus LFS (supplemental)
- Began service: October 25, 1947; September 8, 2009 (Bx36 LTD)

Route
- Locale: Manhattan and The Bronx
- Communities served: Washington Heights, Morris Heights, Tremont, West Farms, Van Nest, Parkchester, Soundview, Castle Hill
- Start: Little Dominican Republic/Washington Heights - George Washington Bridge Bus Terminal/179th Street & Fort Washington Avenue
- Via: West 181st Street, Tremont Avenue, White Plains Road
- End: Castle Hill - Olmstead Avenue & Seward Avenue
- Length: 6.5 miles (10.5 km)
- Other routes: Bx3 University/Sedgwick Aves; Bx11 170th/East 174th Sts; Bx13 Ogden/River Aves; Bx35 E.L. Grant Hwy/East 167th/169th Sts

Service
- Operates: 24 hours (Bx36); Rush hours (Bx36 LTD)
- Annual patronage: 3,184,854 (2025)
- Transfers: Yes
- Timetable: Bx36

The Bx36 is a public transit line in the Bronx, New York. Originally a streetcar line, it now runs between Washington Heights in Manhattan and Castle Hill in the Bronx, primarily on Tremont Avenue and White Plains Road.

== Route description ==
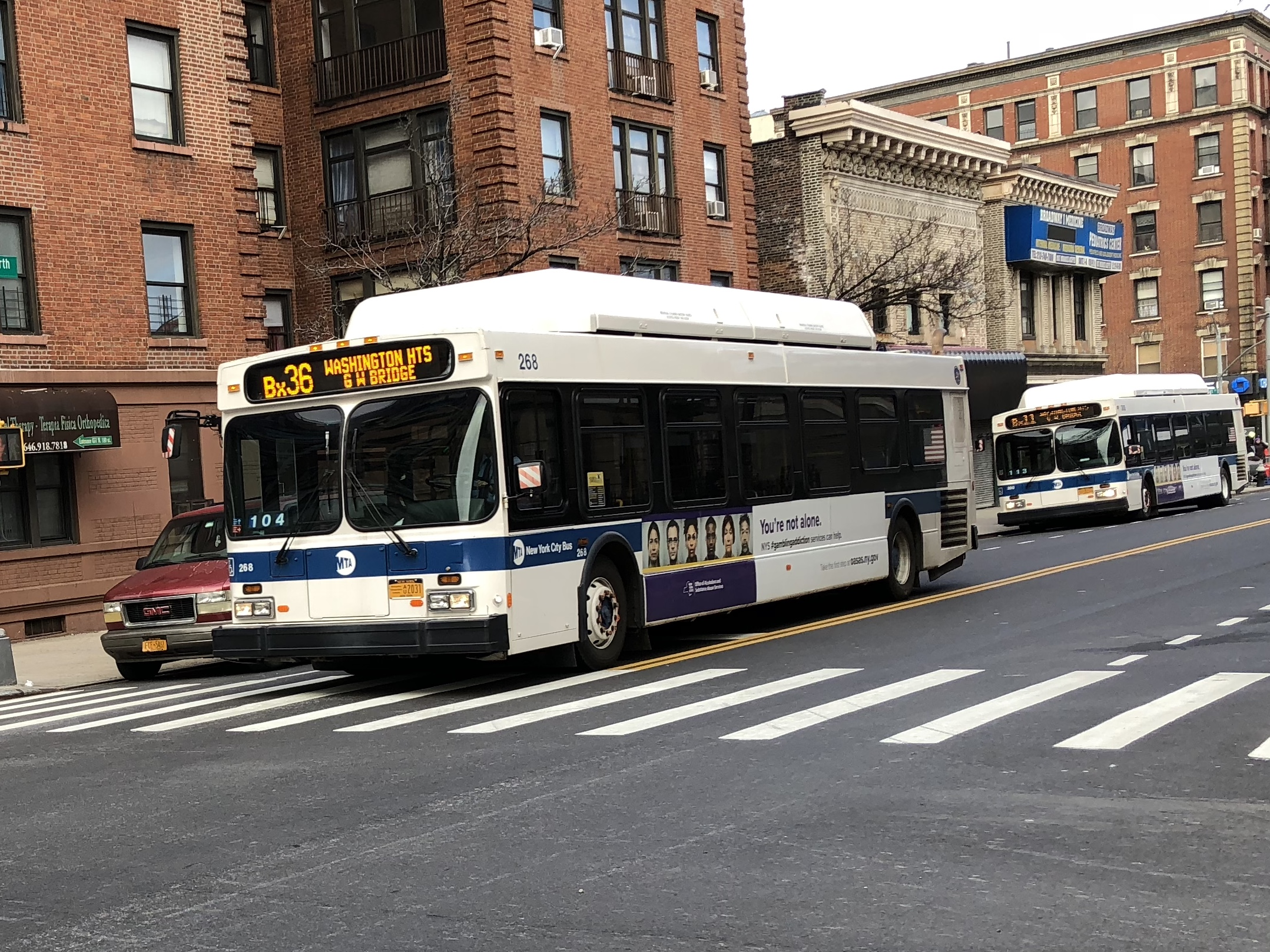
A 2011 C40LF (268) on the G.W. Bridge-bound Bx36 at Wadsworth Avenue in Washington Heights

The Bx36 begins at the George Washington Bridge Bus Terminal in Washington Heights, Manhattan, and uses West 179th Street, Fort Washington Avenue, and West 178th Street to access Wadsworth Avenue, while buses accessing the George Washington Bridge Bus Terminal use West 179th Street. It then continues on Wadsworth Avenue until it turns to West 181st Street, and continues east and across the Washington Bridge until it turns to University Avenue, and then to Tremont Avenue. It then continues along Tremont Avenue until White Plains Road. It turns then continues south on White Plains Road until it turns to Lafayette Avenue and then Pugsley Avenue, and uses Seward Avenue and Olmstead Avenue to access the Soundview terminus, while buses heading westbound use Randall Avenue to access Pugsley Avenue. Select local trips originate/terminate at Boston Road and East Tremont Avenue.

The Bx36 also employs limited-stop service, which runs during weekday rush hours only, and makes all local stops in Manhattan and south of Story Avenue.

=== School trippers ===
When school is in session, two westbound trips originate at a school complex at Lafayette/Pugsley Avenues. These trips depart at 2:40pm and 2:45pm and make local stops.

== History ==
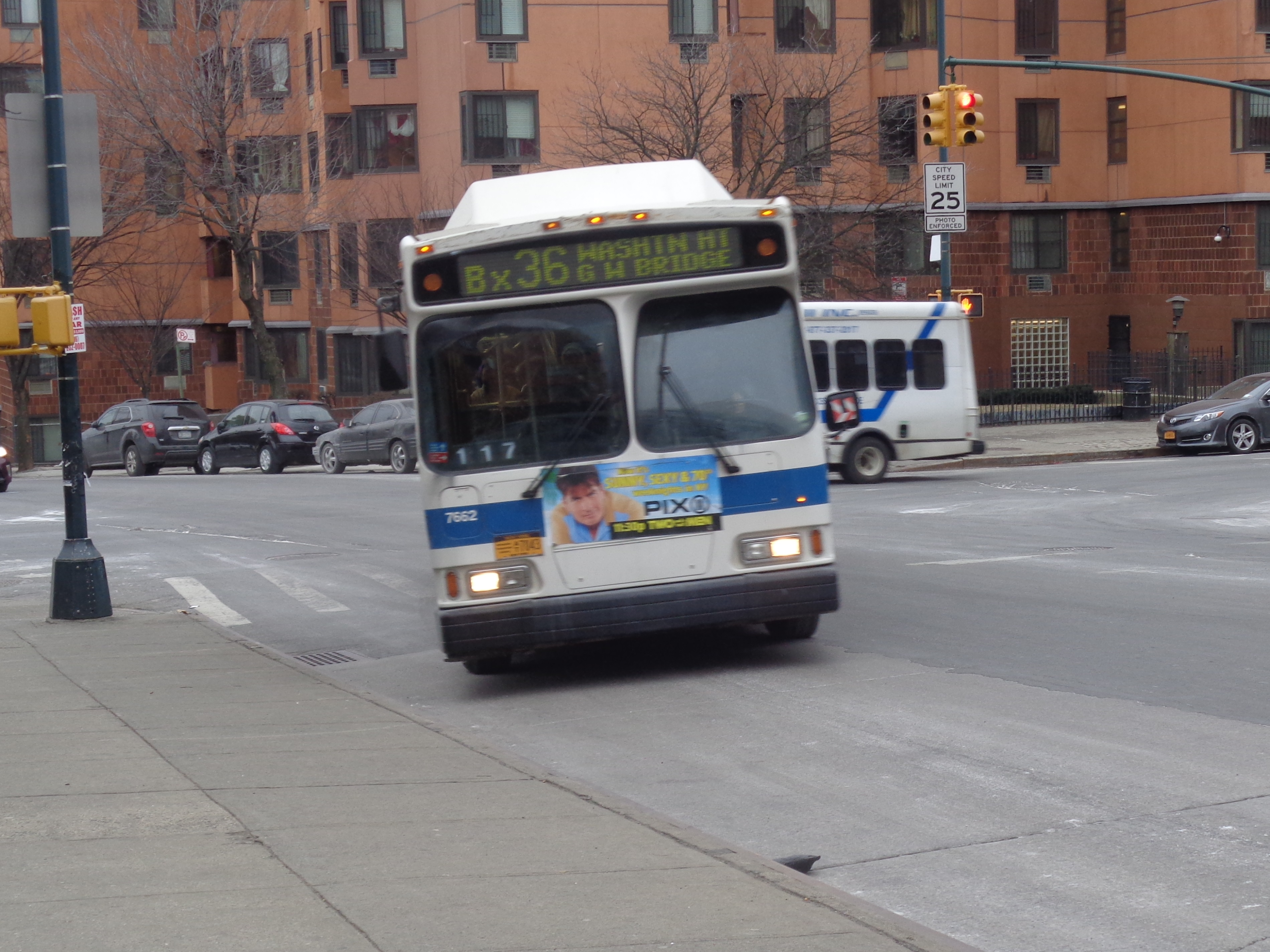
A 2003 Orion VII OG CNG (7662) on the Washington Heights-bound Bx36 in West Farms at East 180th Street/Boston Road

The Bx36 replaced 180th Street Crosstown Line streetcars on October 25, 1947. Its original south-eastern terminus was at Bruckner Boulevard-Zerega Avenue via Cross Bronx Expressway, running at all times except nights until February 1984. On February 14, 1965, every other bus on the route was extended one mile to run to Pugsley Avenue and Story Avenue, instead of to the previous terminal of Chatterton Avenue and Zerega Avenue. These buses would turn off the regular route at Westchester Avenue and White Plains Road, running south on White Plains Road, Houghton Avenue, and Pugsley Avenue to the terminal, and via Story Avenue and White Plains Road before turning back onto Westchester Avenue for the return trip to Manhattan. In November 1967, a full-time terminus was established at White Plains Road and Story Avenue, but later as part of the July 1974 service changes, it was extended to its current southeastern terminus. Eastbound buses were rerouted to use East 174th Street in both directions, with service on the Cross Bronx Expressway being taken over by the Q44. On September 13, 1987, the Bx36 was extended from 181st Street and Broadway to the outside of the George Washington Bridge Bus Station at 179th Street and Broadway and later on January 18, 1998, buses in both directions were rerouted to use Wadsworth Avenue instead of Broadway. Westbound trips were streamlined onto White Plains Road, whereas they had previously deviated to Hugh Grant Circle/Parkchester station prior to September 2000. On September 8, 2009, the Bx36 Limited began service during rush hours, consisting of every other Bx36 during rush hours, and possibly saving up to eight minutes in each direction. In 2017, the MTA released its Fast Forward Plan, aimed at speeding up mass transit services. As part of it, a draft plan for the reorganization of Bronx bus routes was proposed in draft format in June 2019, with a final version published in October 2019. The plan included rerouting service on Tremont Avenue and White Plains Road rather than 180th Street, Boston Road, and 174th Street, with the rerouted Bx40/Bx42 covering 180th Street and the rerouted Bx11 covering 174th Street. Changes would apply to both local and limited-stop variants and were proposed to be implemented by mid-2020. Due to the COVID-19 pandemic in New York City, the changes were halted for over a year. The modification took place on June 26, 2022.
