= Bx35 (New York City bus) =

Bus route in New York City

bx35
- 167th Street Crosstown Line
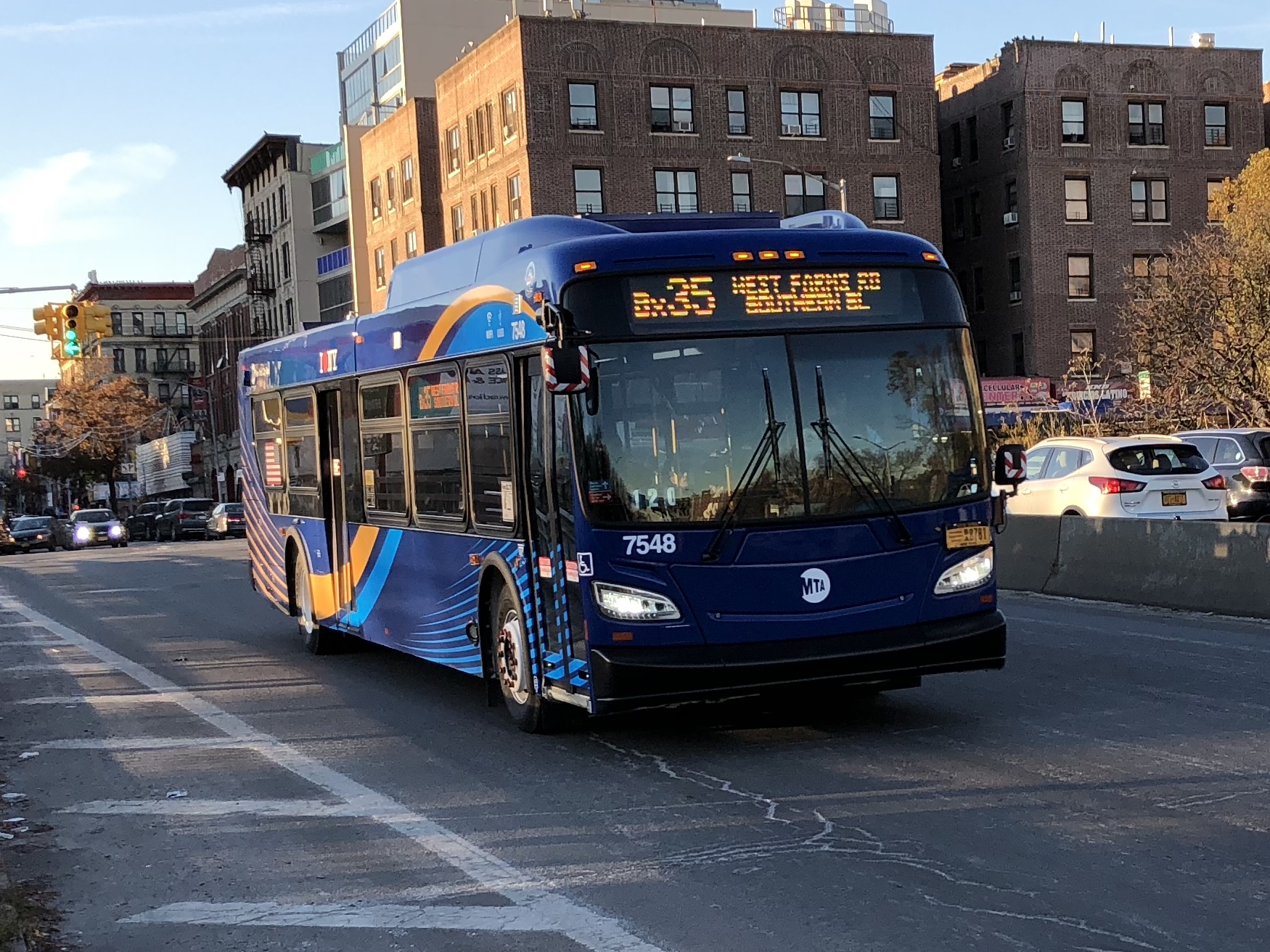
- A 2018 XD40 (7548) on the West Farms-bound Bx35 crossing the Washington Bridge

Overview
- System: MTA Regional Bus Operations
- Operator: Manhattan and Bronx Surface Transit Operating Authority
- Garage: West Farms Depot
- Vehicle: New Flyer Xcelsior XN60; New Flyer Xcelsior XD60; Nova Bus LFS articulated (main vehicles); New Flyer C40LF; New Flyer Xcelsior XN40; New Flyer Xcelsior XD40; Nova Bus LFS (supplemental)
- Began service: July 10, 1948

Route
- Locale: Manhattan and The Bronx
- Communities served: Washington Heights, Highbridge, Mount Eden, Concourse, Morrisania, Longwood
- Start: Little Dominican Republic/Washington Heights - George Washington Bridge Bus Terminal/179th Street & Fort Washington Avenue
- Via: West 181st Street, Edward L. Grant Highway, East 167th Street, East 168th Street, East 169th Street
- End: Longwood - West Farms Road & Jennings Street
- Length: 4 miles (6.4 km)
- Other routes: Bx3 University/Sedgwick Aves; Bx11 170th/East 174th Sts; Bx13 Ogden/River Aves; Bx36 Tremont Avenue/White Plains Road

Service
- Operates: 24 hours
- Annual patronage: 1,888,713 (2025)
- Transfers: Yes
- Timetable: Bx35

The 167th Street Crosstown Line is a public transit line in Manhattan and the Bronx, running primarily along 167th and 169th Streets in the Bronx. Originally a streetcar line, it is now the Bx35 bus route.

== Route description and service ==
=== Streetcar line ===
The 167th Street Crosstown Line, operated by the Third Avenue Railway, ran from Broadway and 181st Street (the George Washington Bridge Bus Terminal did not exist at the time) east along it across the Washington Bridge, south on Edward L. Grant Highway, east along 167th Street, north on Webster Avenue, east along 168th Street, north on Franklin Avenue, east on 169th Street, continuing as it merges into 167th Street, and northeast along Westchester Avenue until terminating at the Whitlock Avenue station.The line ran under the designation "X167", with X being used as a prefix for the Third Avenue Railway's crosstown routes.

=== Current bus service ===
The Bx35 begins at the George Washington Bridge Bus Terminal in Washington Heights, Manhattan, and uses West 179th Street, Fort Washington Avenue, and West 178th Street to access Wadsworth Avenue, while buses accessing the George Washington Bridge Bus Terminal use West 179th Street. It then continues on Wadsworth Avenue until it turns to West 181st Street, and follows the same route as the streetcar line, using exclusive bus lanes in the median of Edward L. Grant Highway. However, it deviates from the streetcar route at West Farms Road, continuing northeast along the street until reaching Jennings Street, where it terminates. Westbound buses run west on Jennings Street and south on Bryant Avenue before following the eastbound route back to GWB Bus Terminal. Select westbound buses short-turn at University Avenue & West 174th Street.

== History ==
The Bx35 replaced 167th Street Crosstown Line streetcars on July 10, 1948, albeit slightly truncated to Westchester Avenue-East 167th Street. Residents of a nearby building protested having the route use Bryant Avenue (as 167th Street is one-way westbound between Bryant and Westchester Avenues) and believed the diesel fumes would create public health hazard for the immediate community. The Surface Transportation Company said they would consider an alternate terminus the Bx35 could use. On September 15, 1990, it was rerouted to serve West Farms Road-Southern Boulevard and rerouted to stop at the Grand Concourse on the surface street instead of using the platforms on the 167th Street tunnel that the trolley had also used. On September 1, 2019, the route was converted to use articulated buses, alongside service decreases since they have higher capacity than standard buses. In 2017, the MTA released its Fast Forward Plan, aimed at speeding up mass transit services. As part of it, a draft plan for the reorganization of Bronx bus routes was proposed in draft format in June 2019, with a final version published in October 2019. The plan included rerouting service to West Farms Road and Jennings Street to replace a rerouted Bx11, which would be rerouted via East 174th Street to Parkchester to replace a rerouted Bx36, which would be streamlined along Tremont Avenue. Due to the COVID-19 pandemic in New York City, the changes were halted for over a year. The modification took place on June 26, 2022.

== Incidents ==
On the evening of January 14, 2021, just over a year into the Bx35’s articulated era, 55-year old bus operator Everton Beccan made a left turn onto the Washington Bridge too fast. The bus fell off the University Avenue bridge across the Cross Bronx Expressway and crashed onto the lane for exits 1C and 1D. The bus left dangling over the bridge, split in two from the accordion, and a total of eight were injured, including the operator. The bus operator was going at 17-26 mph instead of the 3-5mph limit for turns. With 11 years on the job, Beccan refused a drug and alcohol test upon hospital arrival, and was fired from MTA with no additional payments.
