= Our Lady of Bethlehem (Puerto Rico) =

Flemish-style oil painting

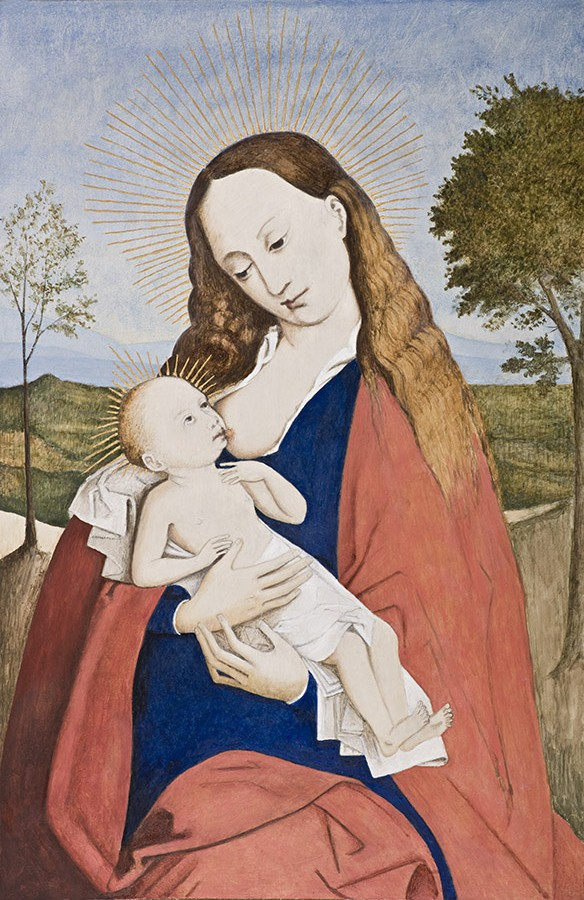
Our Lady of Bethlehem reproduction

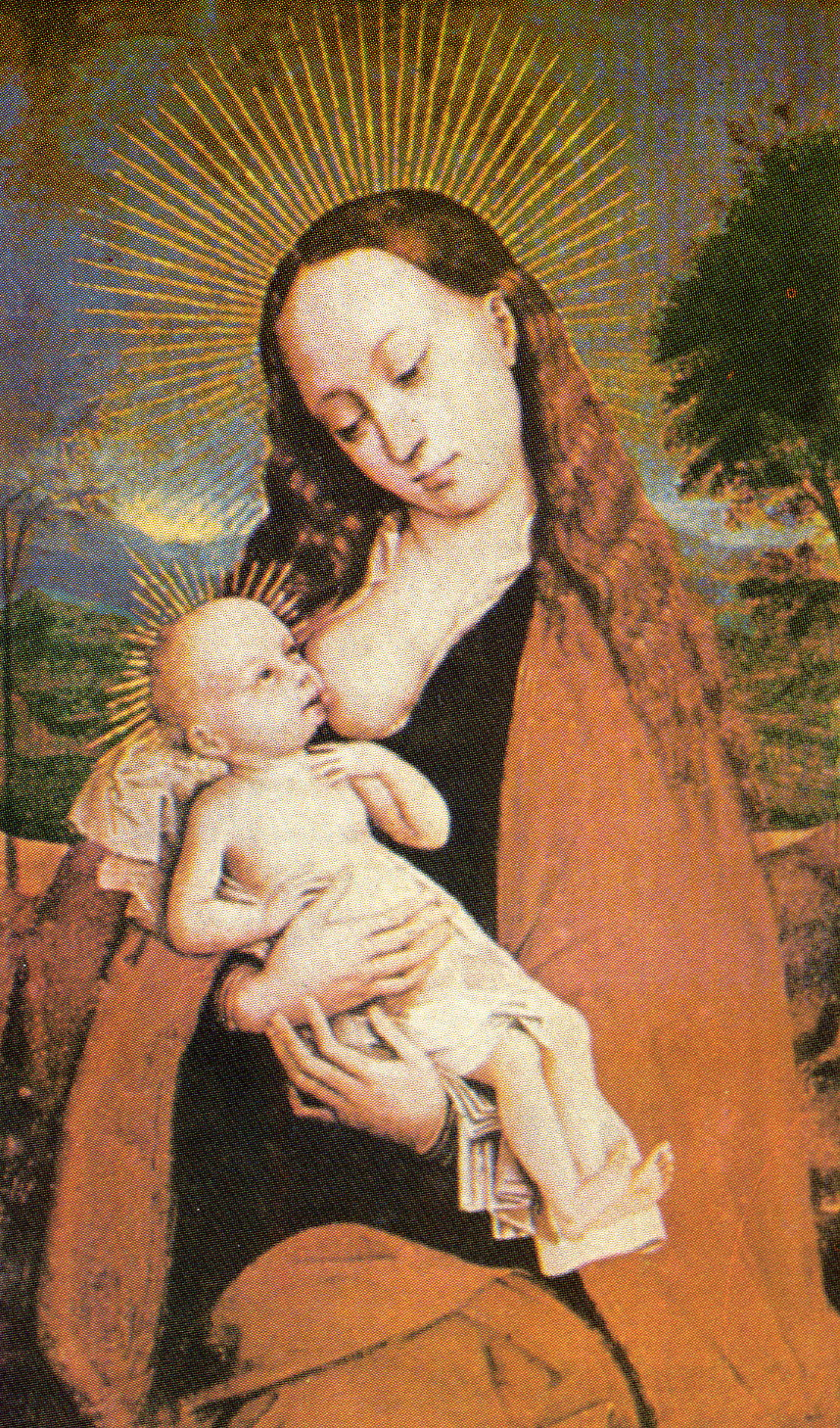
Original 15th-century painting

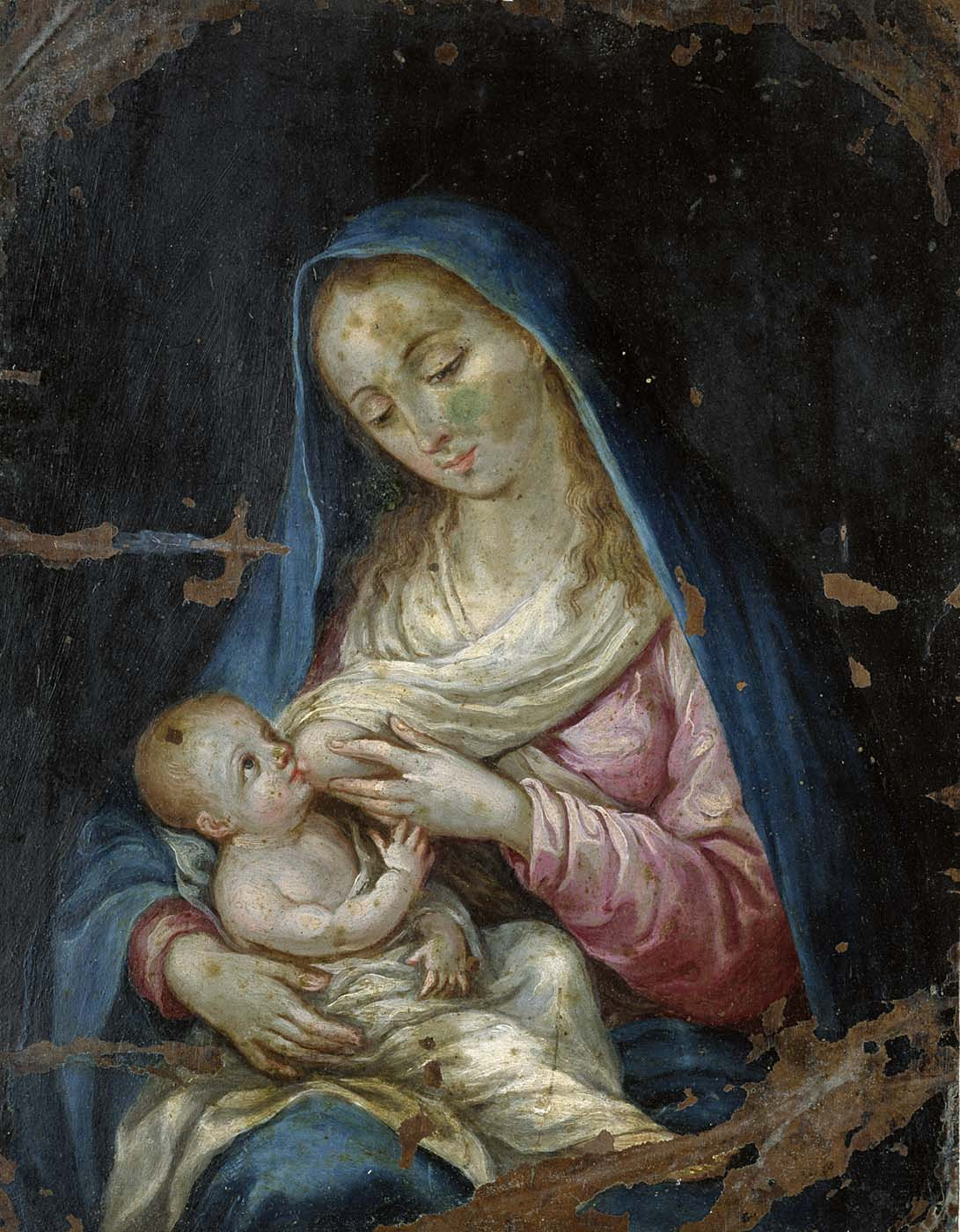
José Campeche version

Our Lady of Bethlehem (Spanish: La Virgen de Belén) is a Flemish-style oil painting of the Virgo Lactans, or Nursing Madonna, taken by the Dominican Order to Puerto Rico in the 16th-century, often attributed to either Rogier van der Weyden or one of his students. Various reproductions and posterior reinterpretations of the painting exist, such as the one made by José Campeche in the late 18th century, but the original copy is now lost.

== Details ==
=== Description of the image ===
The painting depicts the Virgin Mary as Our Lady of Bethlehem, breastfeeding the Christ Child. This iconography is associated with one the oldest Marian devotional titles, Our Lady of the Milk and Good Delivery. With more than 500 years of devotion, is also one of the oldest venerated Marian images in the Americas. The image is painted on a wooden canvas and measures 37.2 cm by 65 cm.

=== History and culture ===
With the exception of its 15th-century Flemish characteristics, the exact origins of the painting are not known. Art historians and religious academics often attribute it to Rogier van der Weyden, one of his students, or to an unknown contemporary Flemish artist. The painting was brought into what would become the San José Church and Convent in 1511, during the early stages of the settlement of San Juan in the 16th century. The painting would be publicly shown during an event known as Bethlehem Sunday (Domingo de Belén), a local devotional celebration that used to take place on the first Sunday after Epiphany.

According to historian Cayetano Coll y Toste, devotion to the iconography and the painting itself was further popularized by bishop Juan Bautista Zengotita after the 1797 Battle of San Juan, where the painting would be carried through a series of extraordinary processions around Old San Juan. This legend, today referred to as the "Procession of the Rogation" (Procesión de la Rogativa), is commemorated in the small plaza of the same name, in addition of being the source of various other works of art and literature. Having been considered the "Guardian of the City" (Protectora de la ciudad), various popular reproductions were created during this time, with Puerto Rican painter José Campeche also creating various Rococo reinterpretations of the painting at the time.

The painting remained throughout the centuries at the Thomas Aquinas Convent until the American invasion of Puerto Rico, when the monastery and church were abandoned. The painting, along with the church treasury, remained in the same location until the acquisition of the complex by the Puerto Rico Institute of Culture (Instituto de Cultura Puertorriqueña or ICP), who converted it into the National Gallery of Puerto Rico (Galería Nacional). The painting, however, was stolen on November 25, 1972, along with other works of religious art. The painting has been lost ever since.

== Devotion ==
The devotion to Our Lady of the Milk requests husbands and wives to pray together the third of the joyful mysteries of the rosary, meditating on the Nativity of the Lord. The tradition of milk dates back to the first centuries of Christianity. Those converting to Christianity were given a mixture of milk and honey to drink, which in the early churches of Egypt, Rome, and Northern Africa was blessed at the Easter and Pentecost vigils. Milk with honey symbolized the union of the two natures in Christ. The custom of giving milk with honey to the newly baptized did not last long, but this tradition is visible in artistic representations.

=== Origin of the tradition ===
According to tradition, the Milk Grotto, not far from Bethlehem, is the site where the Holy Family took refuge during the Massacre of the Innocents, before their flight to Egypt. While there, the Virgin Mary nursed her Holy Child. Some drops of milk sprinkled the walls, changing to white the color of the stone. According to Franciscan Brother Lawrence, an American who oversees the grotto and chapel for the Franciscan Custody of the Holy Land, the grotto is at least 2,000 years old. Early Christians came to pray here, but the first structure was built around 385.

A second legend identifies this site as the location where the Three Kings visited the Holy Family, and presented their gifts of gold, frankincense and myrrh to Jesus. A tradition going back to the 7th century, located at this site the burial place of the innocent victims killed by Herod the Great after the birth of Jesus.

== See also ==
- Marian devotions
- Puerto Rican art
