= San Sebastián Street Festival =

Festival that takes place in Old San Juan, Puerto Rico

San Sebastián Street Festival Fiestas de la Calle San Sebastián.
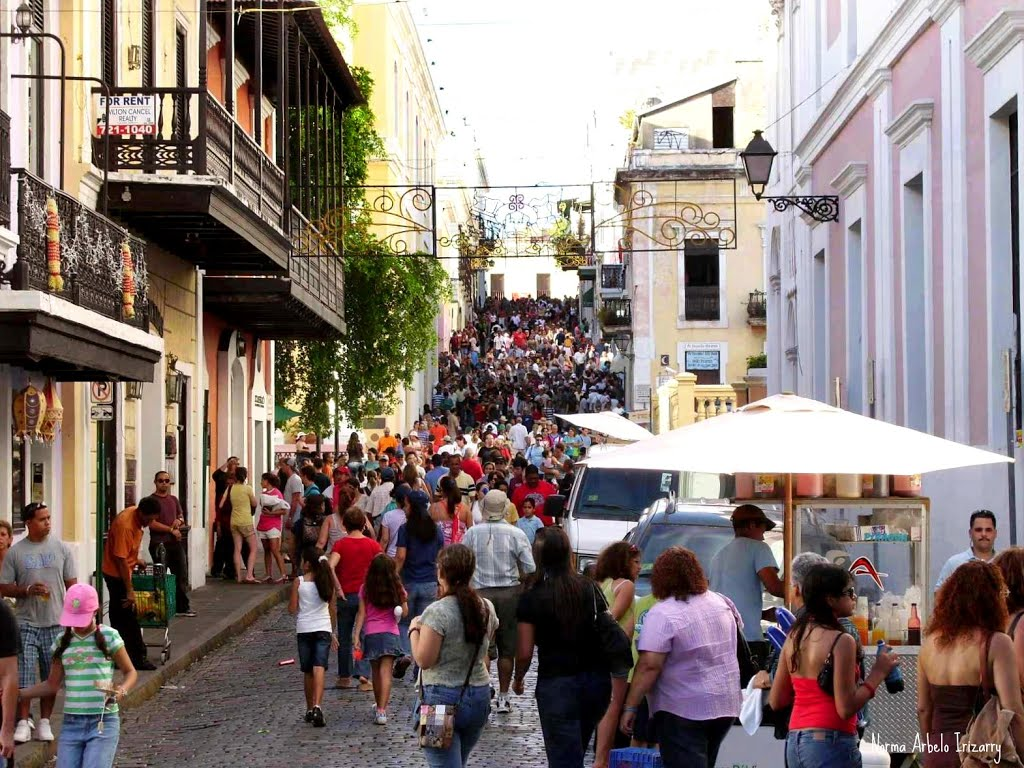
- View of San Sebastián Street during the event in 2005
- Nickname: Fiestas de la SanSe
- Status: Active
- Begins: Third Thursday of January
- Ends: Third Sunday of January
- Frequency: Yearly, third weekend of January coinciding with the feast day of Saint Sebastian
- Location: Centered around San Sebastián Street in Old San Juan in San Juan, Puerto Rico
- Country: Puerto Rico

The San Sebastián Street Festival (Spanish: Fiestas de la Calle San Sebastián), popularly referred to as La SanSe, is a Puerto Rican festival that takes place annually on the third weekend of January in the Old San Juan of San Juan, Puerto Rico. Originally a street-wide celebration (on the street of the same name) in honor of Saint Sebastian, celebrated by the Catholic Church on January 20.

Unofficially and popularly considered the end of the Christmas and holiday season in Puerto Rico, the event has become an important celebration for the city of San Juan and of Puerto Rican culture as a whole, drawing large numbers of attendants of more than 200,000 people and making it an internationally recognized occasion in the island and beyond. The celebration was introduced in Florida and Texas in the 2010s.

== History ==
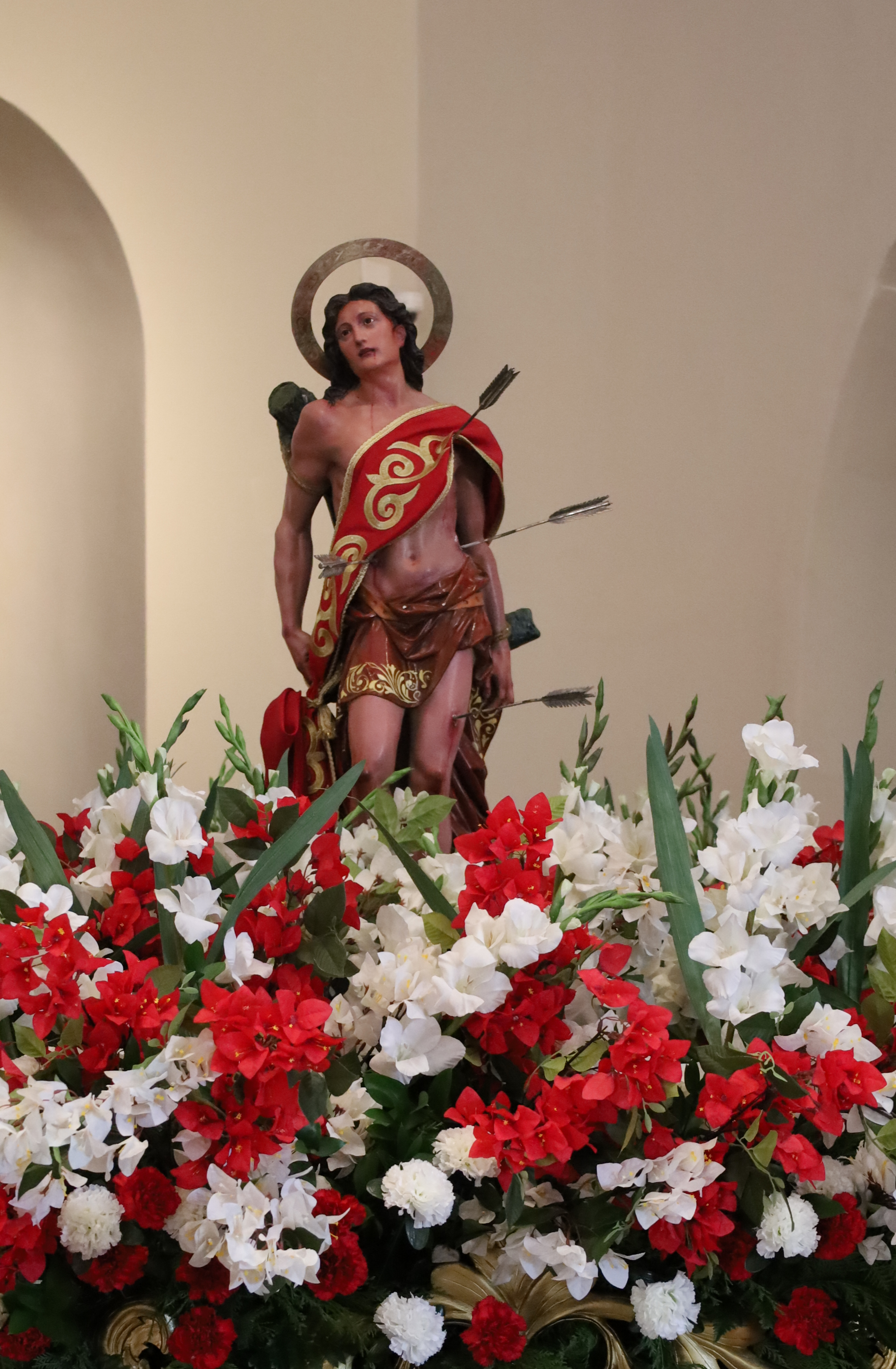
Processional statue of Saint Sebastian at the Church of San José

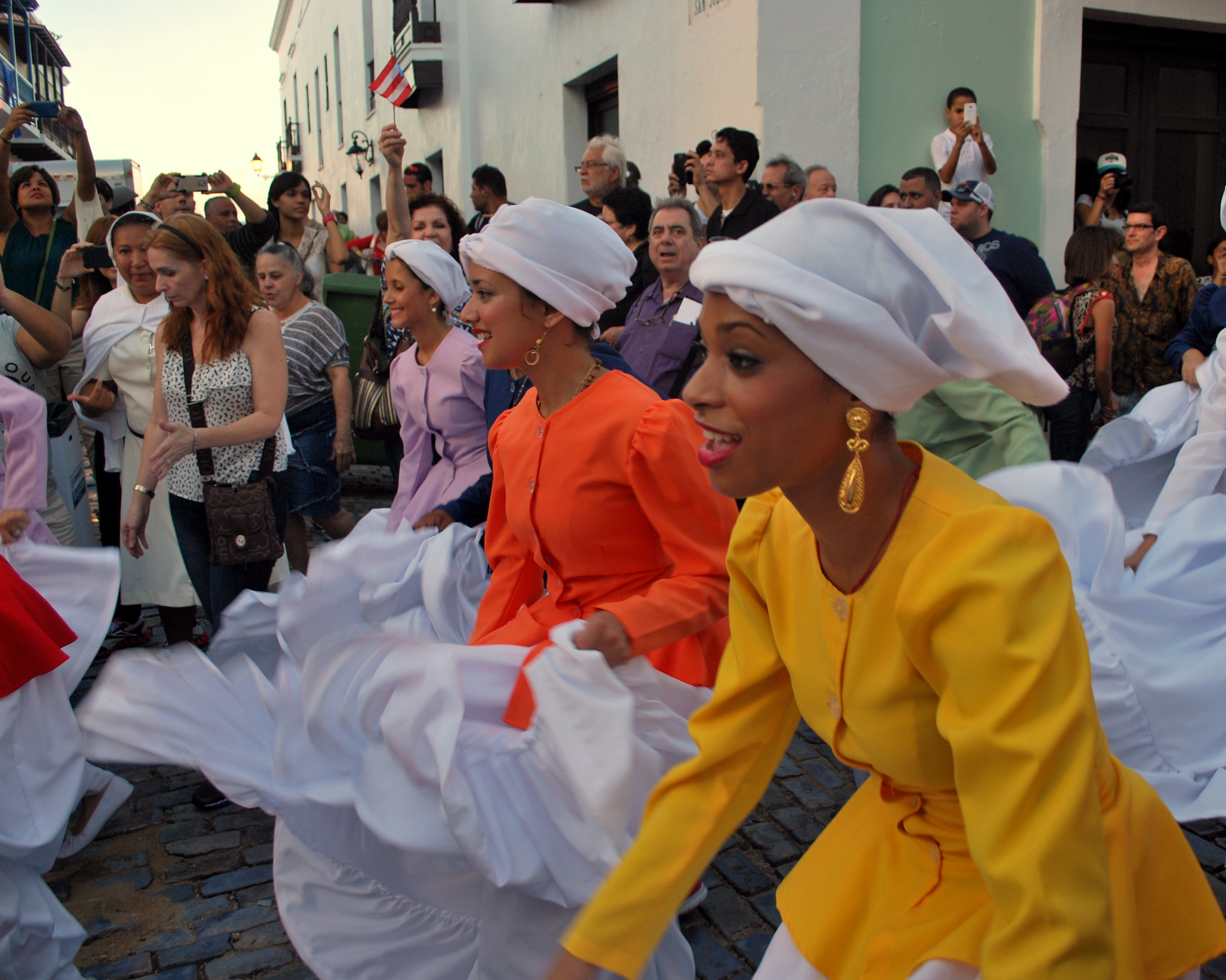
Dancers at the San Sebastián Festival in San Juan, in 2013

Before the establishment of the modern festival, a small annual procession dedicated to the Saint Sebastian used to take place along San Sebastián Street (Calle San Sebastián) following a mass dedicated to the martyr as established by Juan Manuel Madrazo, parishioner of San José Church during the 1950s, with the purpose to commemorate the life of the Saint and to raise money to repair the church building.

The event was celebrated until the retirement of Madrazo. In 1970, historian and anthropologist Ricardo Alegría of the Institute of Puerto Rican Culture (ICP) proposed a revival of this tradition in the form of a festival to Rafaela Balladares de Brito, a then community leader and renown resident of San Sebastian Street, with the purpose of creating an event that would celebrate Puerto Rican culture while raising funds for the Colegio de Párvulos, a nearby Catholic elementary school directed by Sisters of Charity.

Although the event was first organized and managed by the local community with assistance from the Institute of Puerto Rican Culture, as it grew in size to become a larger scale event, responsibility over it was slowly transferred to the Municipality of San Juan, which today is in charge of planning, management, logistics, security and infrastructure. The event has been celebrated yearly since its inception in the 1970s with the exception of the 2021 and 2022 celebrations which were cancelled due to the COVID-19 pandemic.

The 2020 celebration was momentarily cancelled in the aftermath of the January 7 earthquake that occurred in southwestern Puerto Rico but was quickly reinstated by mayor Carmen Yulín Cruz.

== The festival today ==
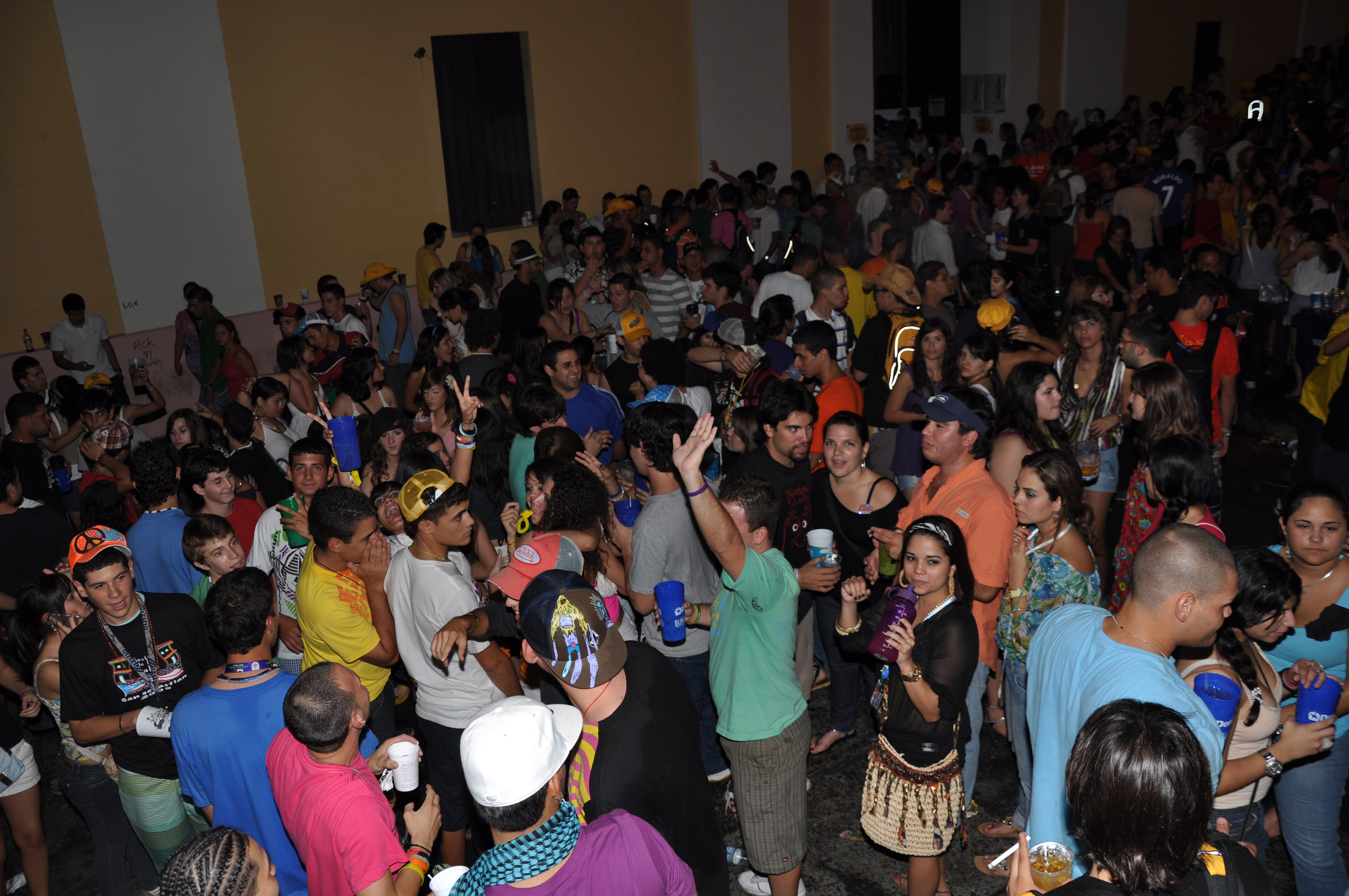
Fiestas de la Calle San Sebastián in 2009

=== In Puerto Rico ===
Although the festival today still maintains its religious connotation in the form of its annual opening mass that is dedicated to its namesake, it has grown to become an important social and cultural event beyond its patronal origin. The event today holds high importance in the celebration of Puerto Rican folk arts, music and tradition, with traditional arts and crafts markets, musical and choreographic performances occurring in different stages around the Old San Juan.

One of the most iconic elements of the festival is the Comparsa de los Cabezudos (Spanish for "parade of the Big Heads"), a parade of large-headed figures with exaggerated and sometimes humorous facial expressions or characteristics, typically made of papier-mâché, that begins by the San Juan Cathedral to join the street wide celebrations, dancing and singing with the public. Cabezudos originally depicted humorous archetypes from local and Puerto Rican folklore, such as El General (a local Emperor Norton-like figure) and Juan Bobo, but now have come to portray and even pay tribute to important people from the history of Puerto Rico such as Felisa Rincón de Gautier, Francisco Oller, Diplo, José Campeche, Maso Rivera, Juan Antonio Corretjer, Don Cholito, Rafael Tufiño, Andy Montañez, and even the co-founder of the modern festival himself, Ricardo Alegría, among others.

=== In the United States ===
In the recent years, as a result of the large influx of Puerto Ricans moving to the United States, the San Sebastián Festival has also been celebrated in different areas of Florida and in the Dallas-Fort Worth area of Texas. In 2021, due to the COVID-19 pandemic, the event was virtually celebrated for the first time. These stateside festivals are also characterized by the presence of Cabezudos as well as Puerto Rican folk arts markets, and wide varieties of traditional Puerto Rican dishes and rums, with more than 6,000 people in attendance.

== See also ==
- Fiestas patronales in Puerto Rico
- Institute of Puerto Rican Culture
