= San José Church =

Catholic church in San Juan, Puerto Rico

- Church and Convent of Santo Tomás de Aquino
- Iglesia de San José
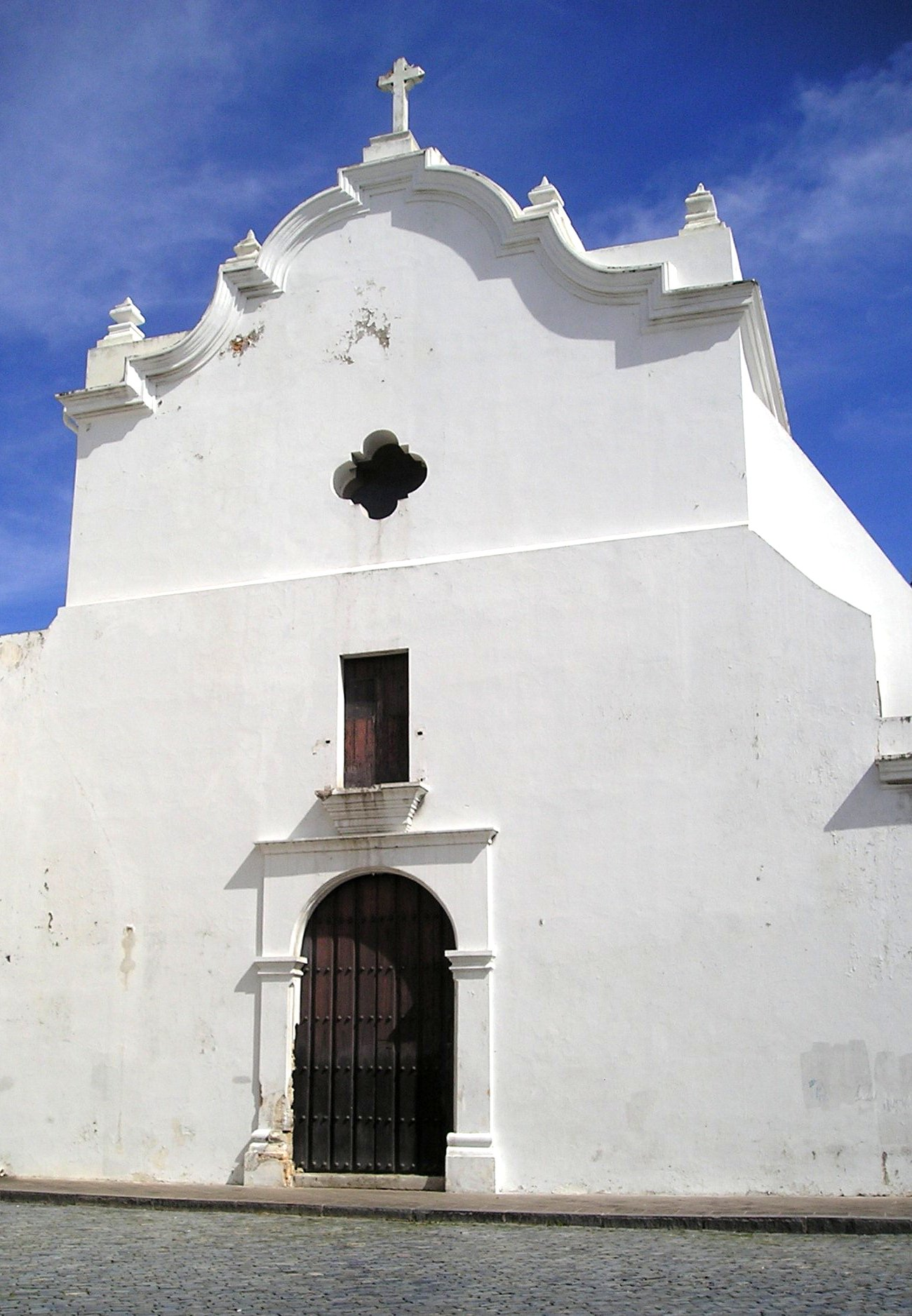
- 2006

- Location in Puerto Rico
- 18.4676°N 66.1182°W
- Location: San Juan, Puerto Rico
- Denomination: Roman Catholic

History
- Founded: 1532
- Dedication: Saint Joseph
- Other dedication: Thomas Aquinas

Architecture
- Functional status: chapel
- Style: Gothic
- Years built: 1532, 1735
- Groundbreaking: 1528

Administration
- Diocese: Archdiocese of San Juan de Puerto Rico
- San José Church
- U.S. National Historic Landmark District – Contributing property
- Part of: Old San Juan Historic District (ID72001553)
- Designated NHLDCP: October 10, 1972

San José Church (Spanish: Iglesia de San José), located in Old San Juan, the historic colonial zone of the capital of Puerto Rico, is one of the first significant works of architecture on the island, and one of the earliest surviving examples of 16th-century Spanish Gothic architecture in the Western Hemisphere. Founded as the Church and Convent of Santo Tomás de Aquino in 1532, the Dominican convent survived until 1836 when the complex was closed and secularized. The church itself became a parish under the Jesuits in 1858 (when it acquired its current name), and then under the Paulist Fathers in 1911, until its transfer to the diocese of San Juan in 1969. The convent building was acquired by the government of Puerto Rico and turned into the National Gallery (Galería Nacional) of the Institute of Puerto Rican Culture (Instituto de Cultura Puertorriqueña or ICP) in 1960.

In 2013, it was added to the National Trust for Historic Preservation's list of 11 Most Endangered Historic Places of 2013. The church today is part of the Old San Juan Historic District and National Historic Landmark, and has undergone major revitalization efforts to prevent its demise and preserve its historic and architectural value. Restoration of the church was completed in March 2021.

== History ==
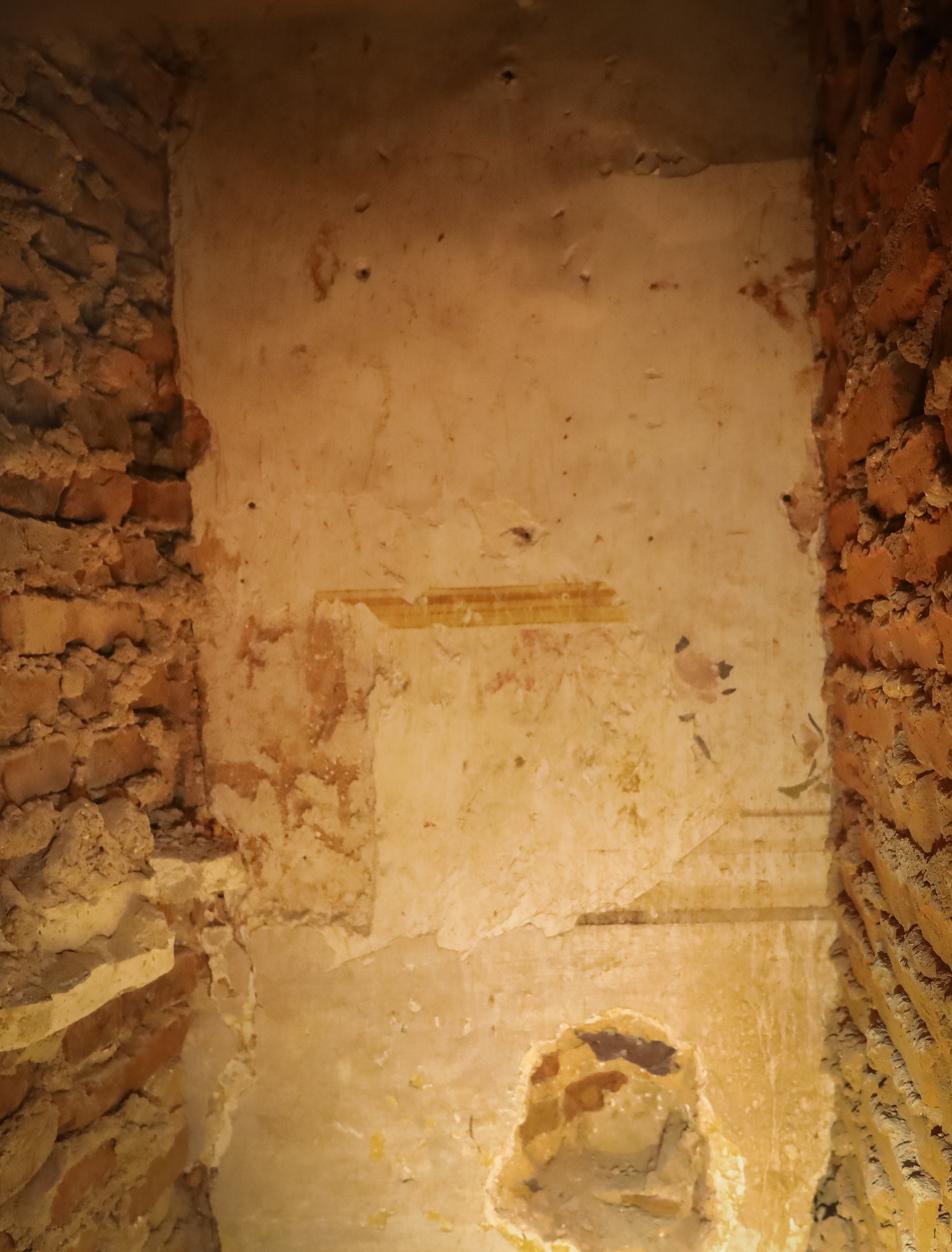
16th century frescoes

Ten years before the foundation of San José Church, the site for the convent was donated by Juan Ponce de León to the Dominican Order in 1522 at the then northernmost edge of the newly established settlement of Puerto Rico de San Juan Bautista. Construction of the church began in 1528, and it was canonically founded in 1532 as part of the Dominican monastery dedicated to Thomas Aquinas. The church was first built in the Isabelline style of architecture, showcasing the transitioning influences of the Gothic and Renaissance eras of Spanish architecture in the New World.

Juan Ponce de León, the first governor of Puerto Rico, was buried in the crypt of the church from 1559 to 1836, when his remains were exhumed and later transferred to the San Juan Cathedral. His grandson, Juan Ponce de Leon II is still buried in the crypt beneath the shrine floor. The church crypt continued being used as a burial place for the Spanish governors of Puerto Rico throughout the period of the Captaincy General. Puerto Rican painter José Campeche is also buried within the church.

The church underwent significant remodeling in 1647, 1735 and 1772. The most recent barrel vault was completed in 1773, and doors made from ausubo wood (Manilkara bidentata) were installed in 1792. Unlike the Cathedral of San Juan, which suffered considerable damage due to the 1787 Puerto Rico earthquake, San José Church seemingly survived the disaster with little to no damages according to official reports of the time.

The convent and its churched passed ownership from the Dominican Order to the Jesuits in 1858, who renamed the church after Saint Joseph. While the church was kept open, the convent itself closed down in the 19th century after the Spanish government secularized most institutional convents and acquired the property. The church continued operating as a parish from 1911 to 1969 under the management of the Missionary Society of Saint Paul the Apostle. By 1950, the church was already facing notable disrepair, which motivated its parishioners to organize the now yearly San Sebastián Street Festival in order to raise money for reparations. Its parish status was removed after its congregation dwindled in the 1960s due to the population flight away from the San Juan Islet into other parts of the city and the metropolitan area. In 1969, management of the church was transferred directly to the Archdiocese of San Juan.

The church finally closed down for repairs and restoration work in the 1970s, while most of its treasury and collections were allocated to the cathedral or the ICP for safekeeping. One of its treasures, an important patron icon and 15th-century Flemish painting of Our Lady of Bethlehem had disappeared from the church in 1972. That same year, the church, together with most of Old San Juan, were designated historic monuments as part of the National Historic Landmark program of the National Park Service.

=== Restoration ===
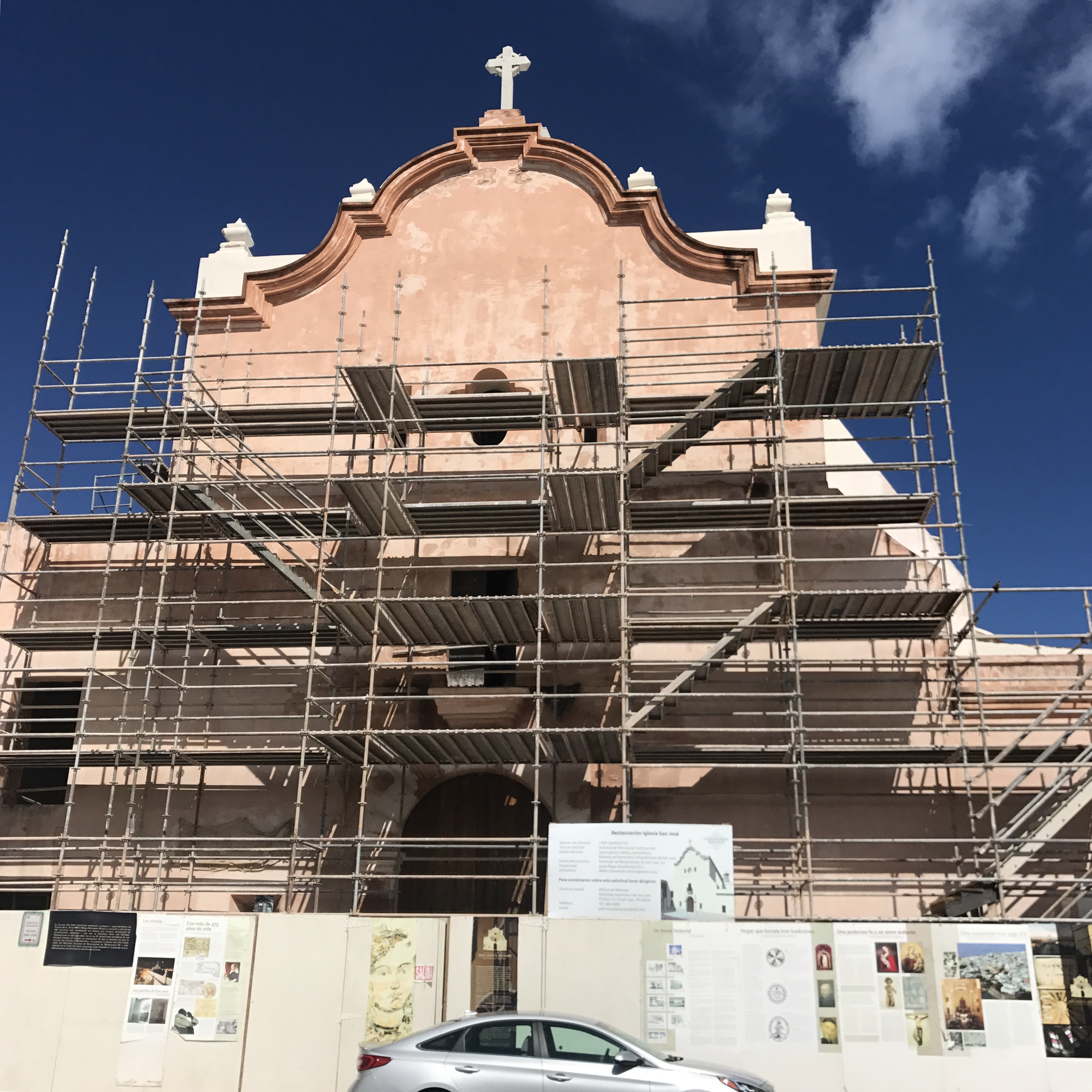
Restoration work in 2018

Scholar Ricardo Alegría began the restoration of the church in 1977, much later than his general work in Old San Juan with the Institute of Puerto Rican Culture (ICP) due to its ownership, in collaboration with cardinal Luis Aponte Martínez. The restoration reverted its design to reflect the original Isabelline Gothic style. Alegría recruited architect José García Gómez and engineer José Luis Capacete to deal with the lighting structures. However, uncertainty about the state of the roof complicated the work. Ultimately, Alegría proposed an arrangement that would allow the walls to support the weight of the structure. The work was completed for only $200,000 with several of the involved working pro-bono. There were delays due to lack of funding, promoting Alegría to seek private and public help. Besides the Roman Catholic Church and the archdiocese, the local legislature, Department of Interior, and the Fundación Ángel Ramos also contributed financially towards its restoration.

A 16th century (c. 1540) mural of Saint Telmo was discovered during the process. Indigenous Igneri artifacts dating back to 200 BCE were also unearthed at this time. An obscured arcade, the original location of the pulpit and a 16th century sword were also found. The ICP retrieved a pulpit from El Rastro to place it in the building. Alegría himself donated 13th century figures depicting the burial of Jesus. He also bought an altar from Seville, which was installed for some time. Afterwards, the Instituto de Cultura Hispánica donated a 16th century altar, which arrived in 1987 in a ceremony that featured the Spanish crown. The Cristo de los Ponce, a crucifix that survived a shipwreck during the 16th century was exhibited as part of the decor.

In 2002, another major restoration project on the structure began and several painted murals were rediscovered, including a mid-19th century depiction of the Battle of Lepanto. In 2004, the church was listed on the 2004 World Monuments Watch by the World Monuments Fund, which helped the conservation effort. After additional delays caused by Hurricane Maria in 2017 and the COVID-19 pandemic in 2020, San José Church finally reopened in March 21, 2021.

== Gallery ==
20th century

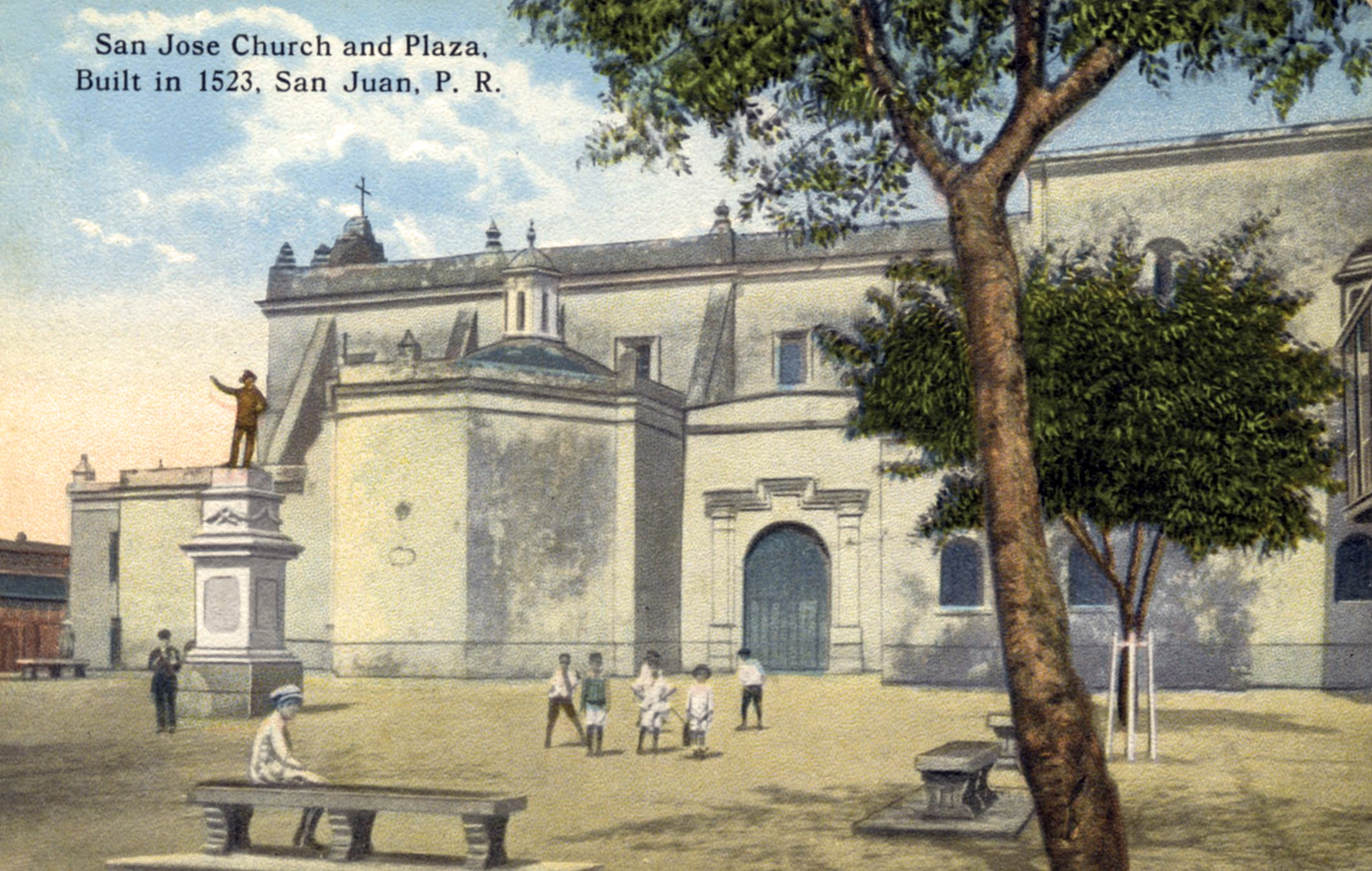
Photomechanical print of 1916

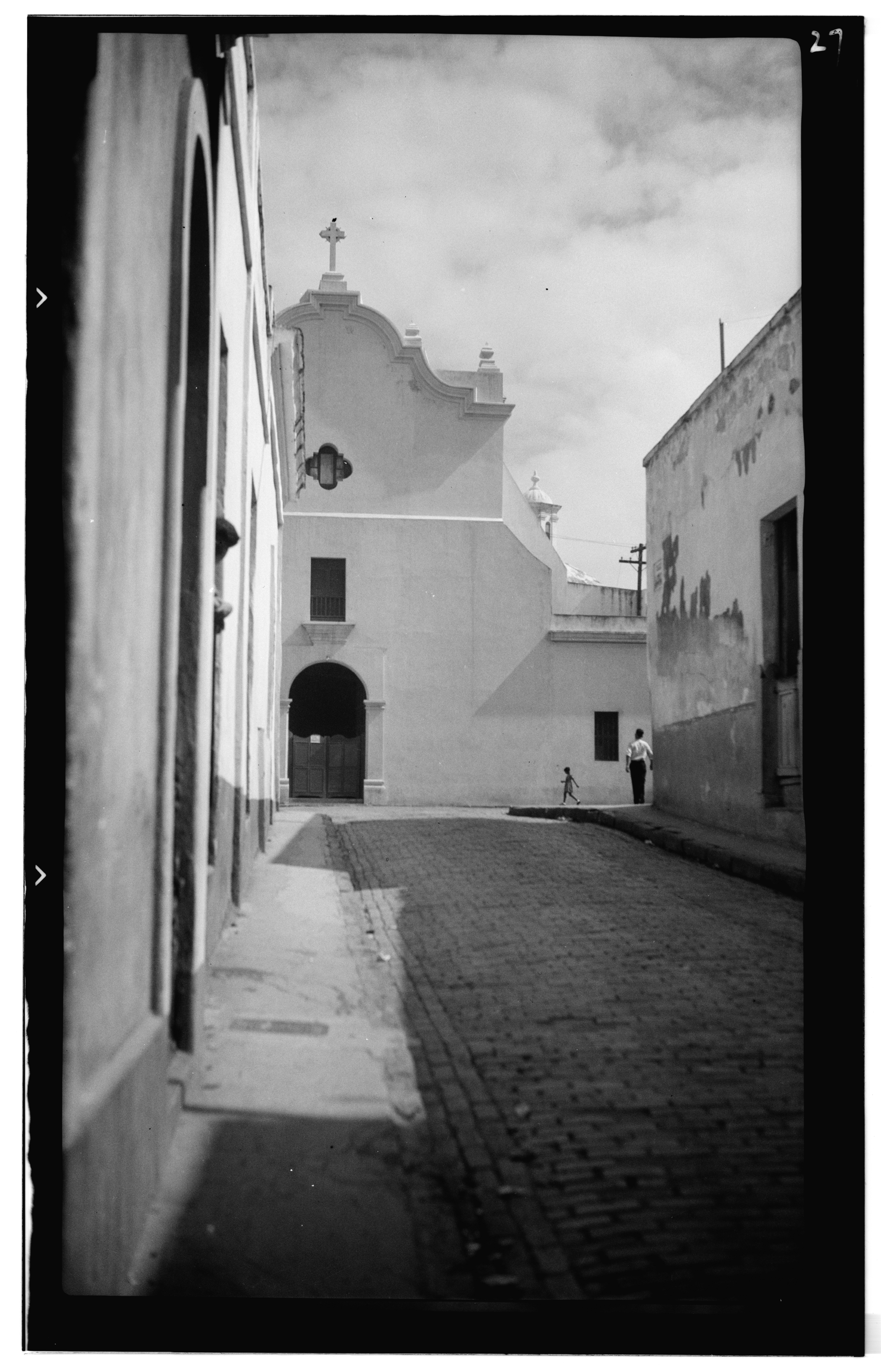
Front view in 1933

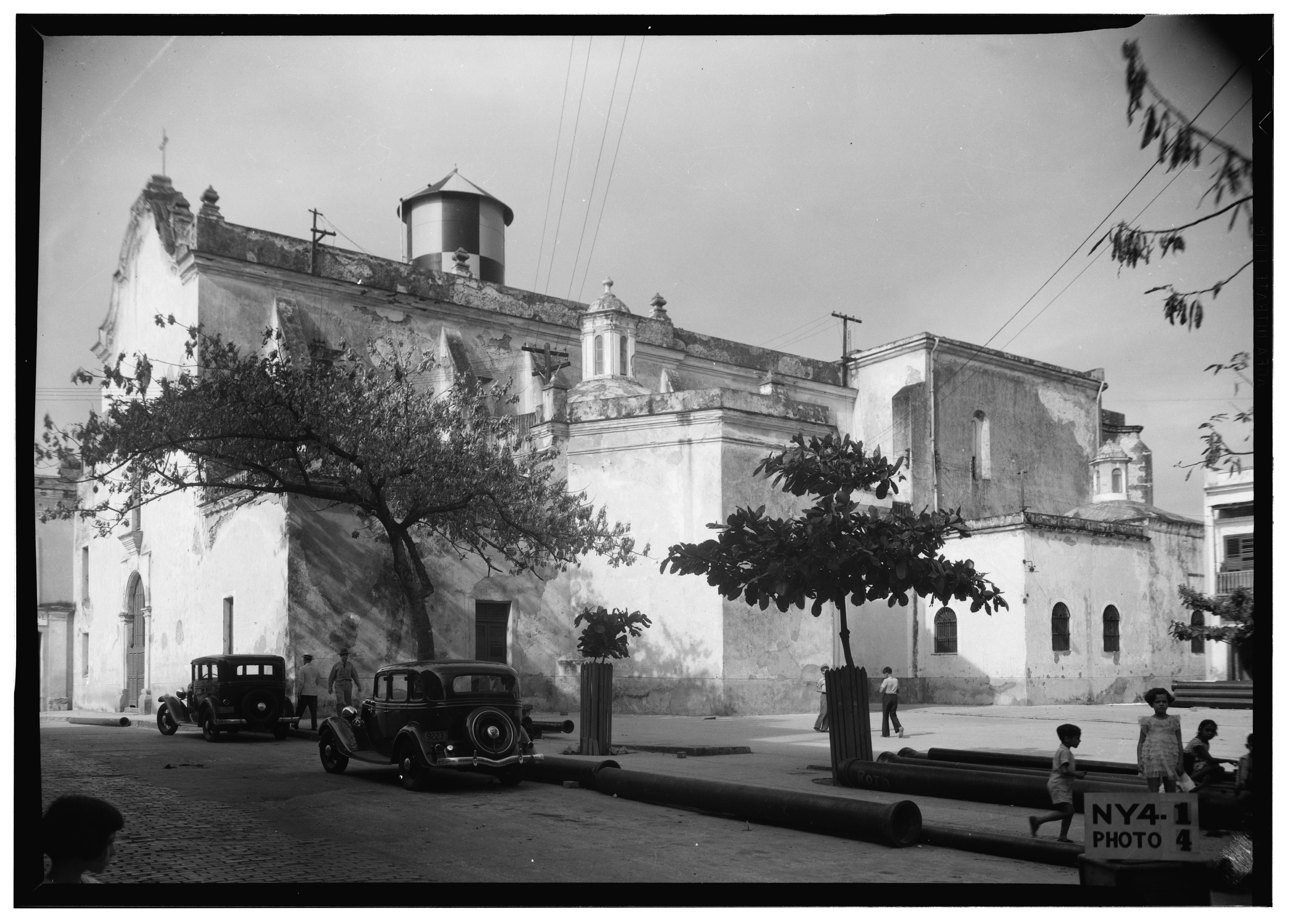
Exterior view in 1933

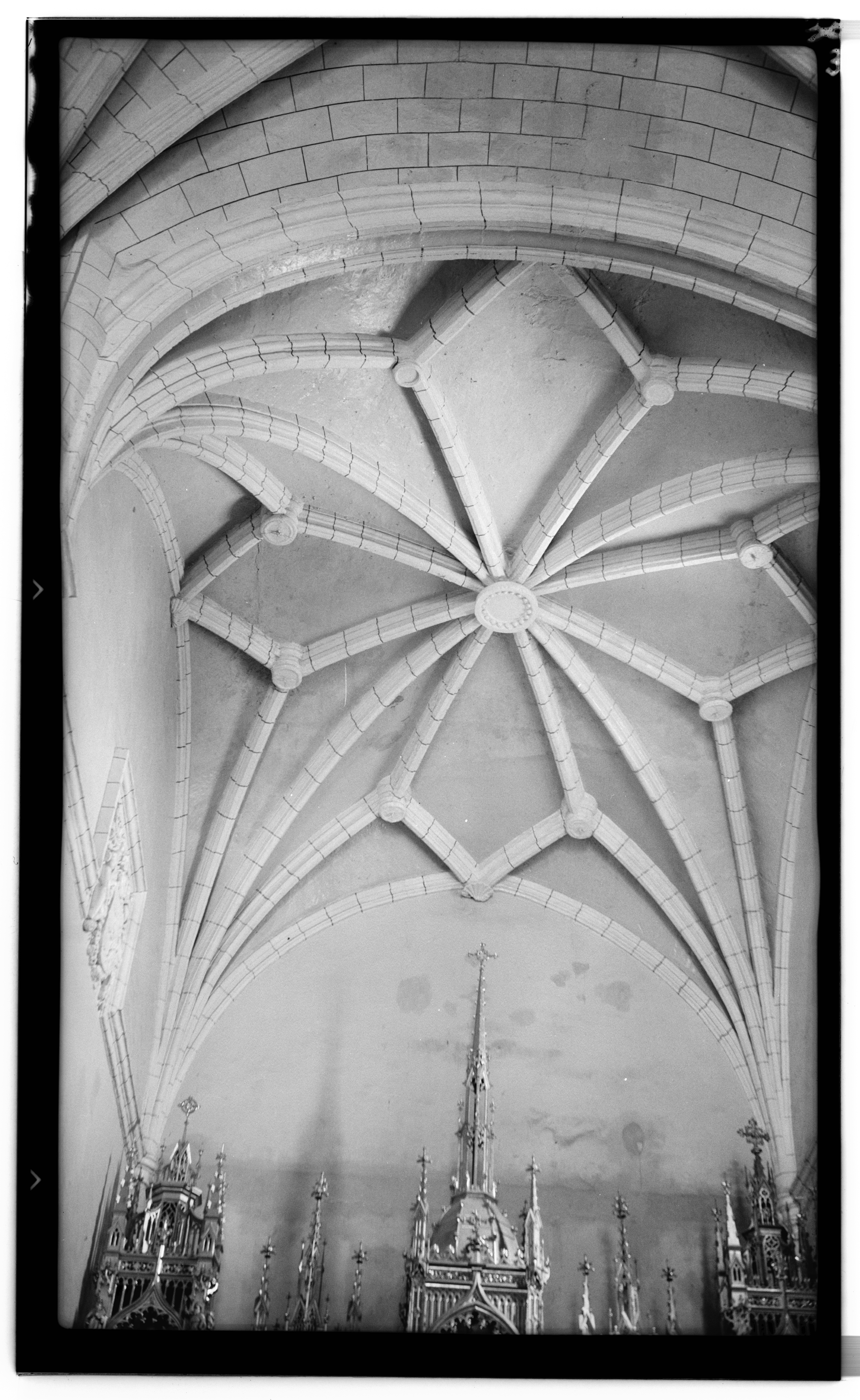
Gothic interior in 1933

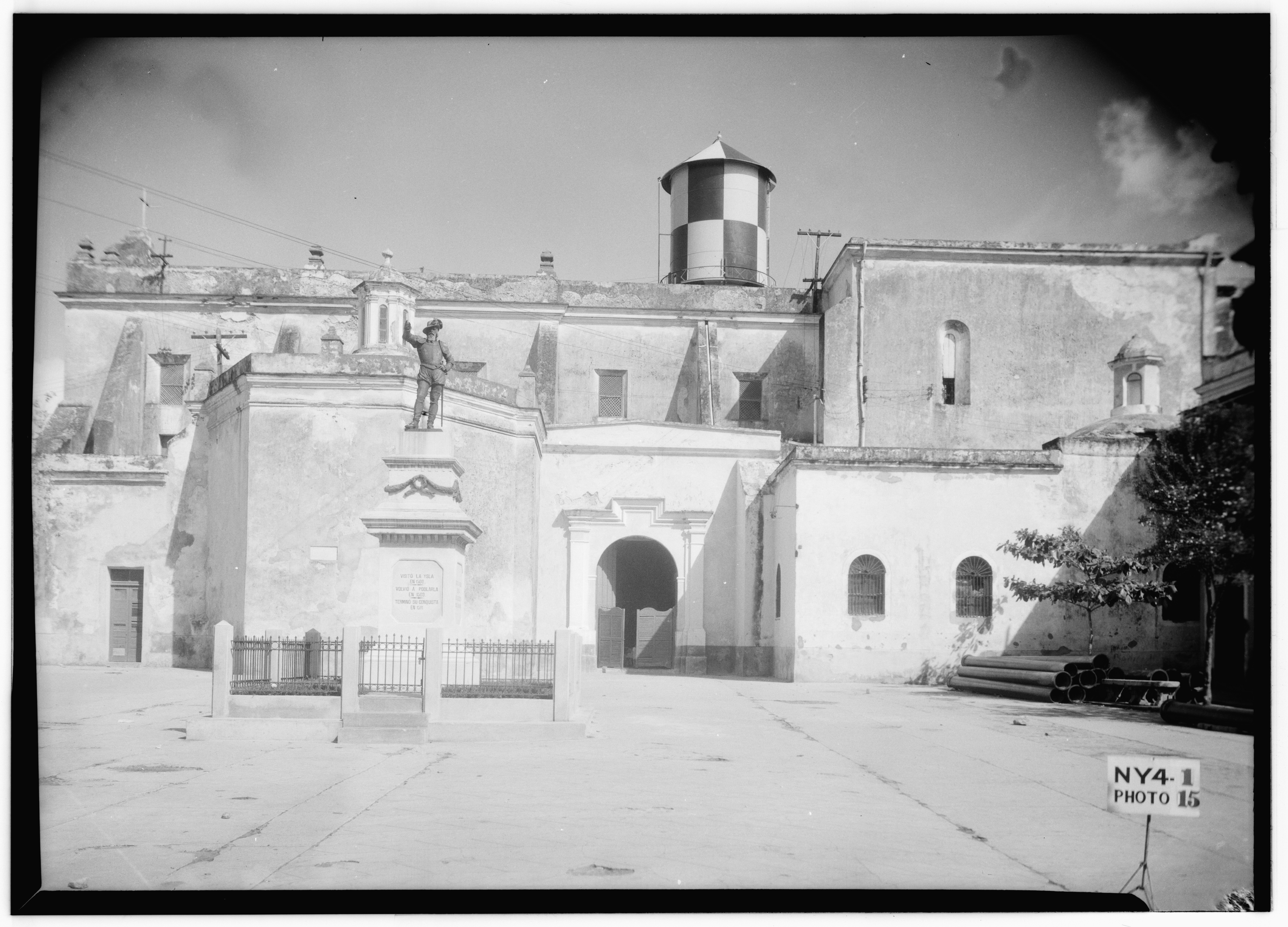
South façade in 1933

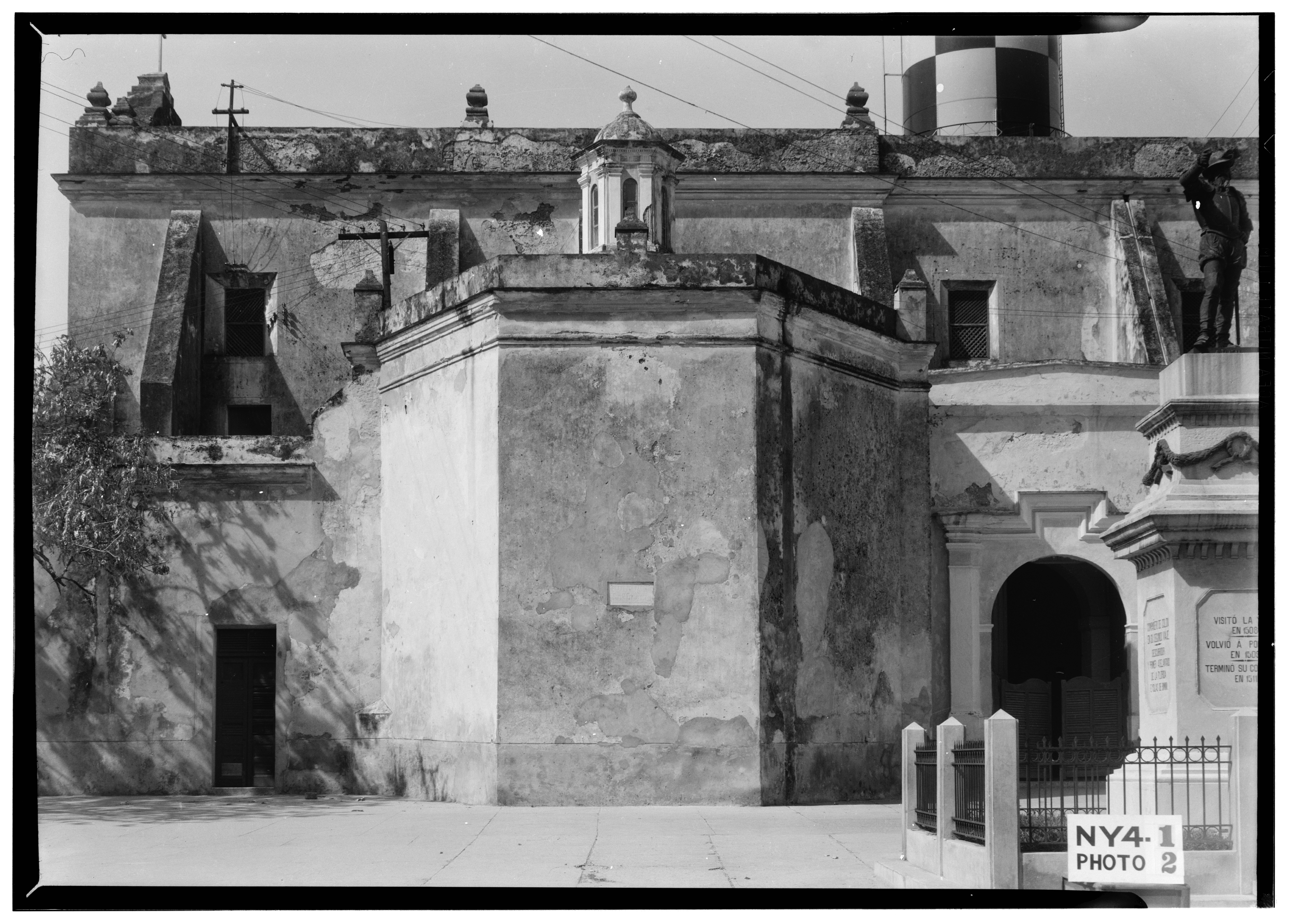
View of the church in 1933

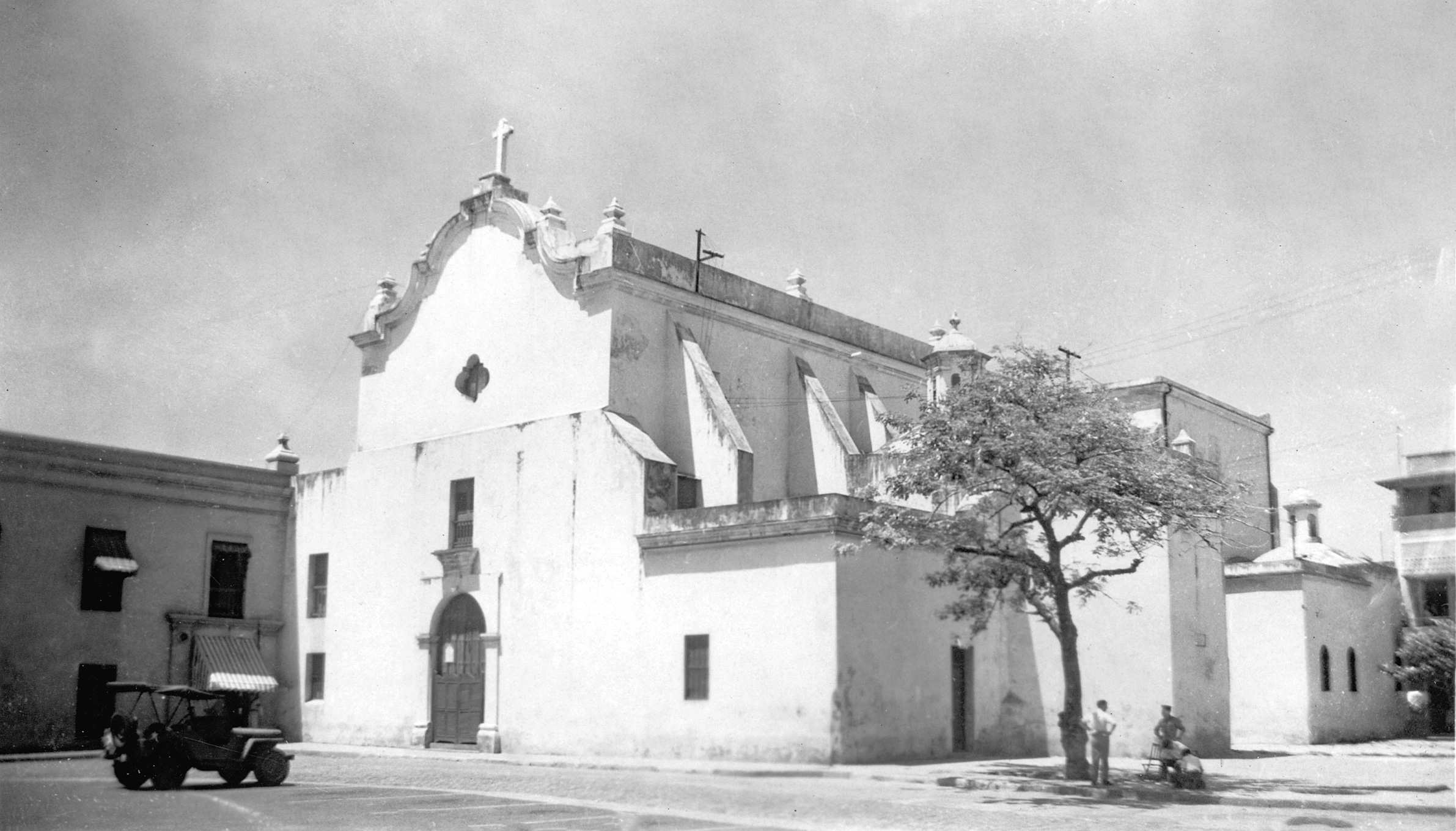
Exterior in 1942

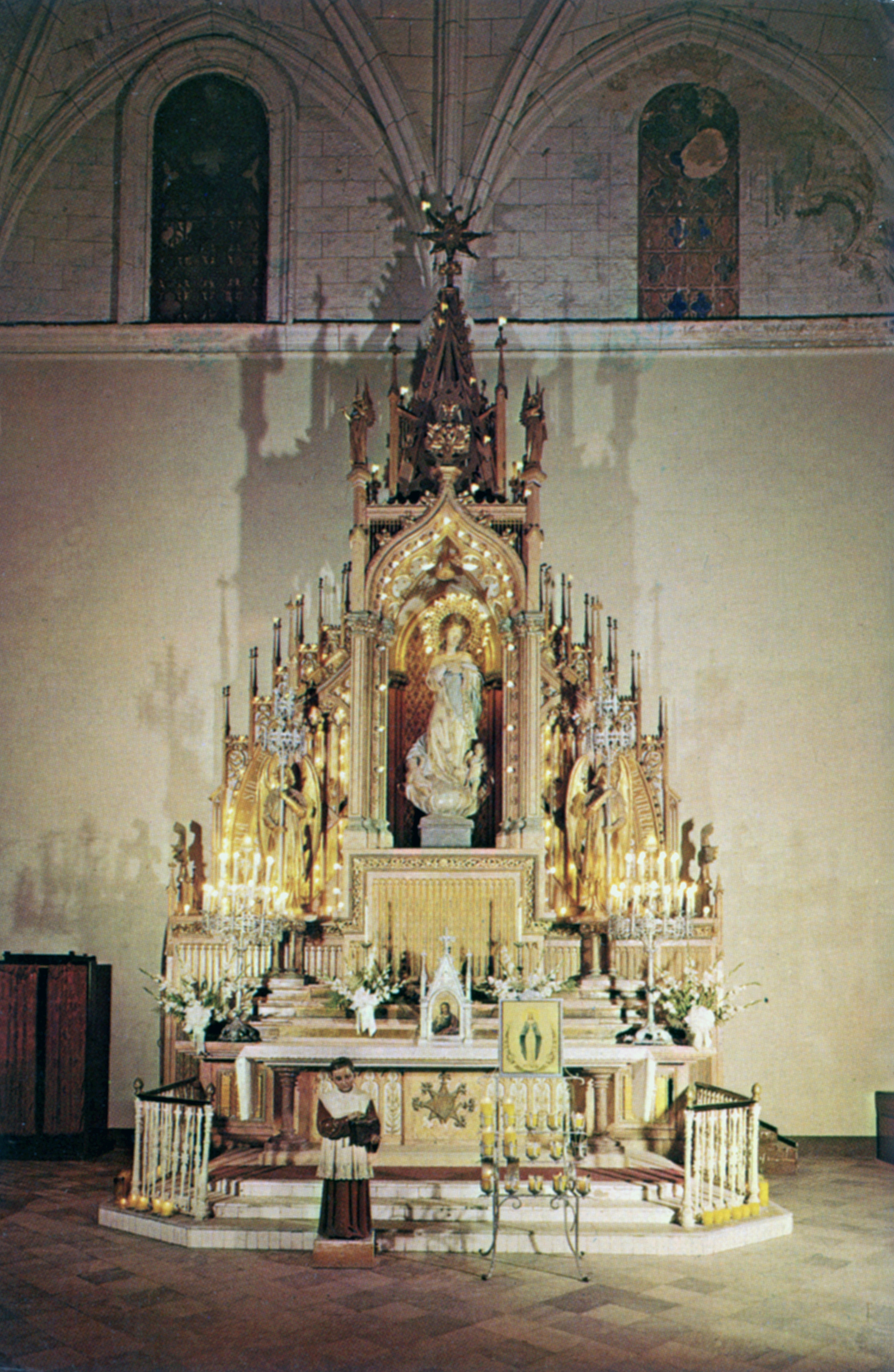
Altar of the Immaculate Conception in 1970
Interior

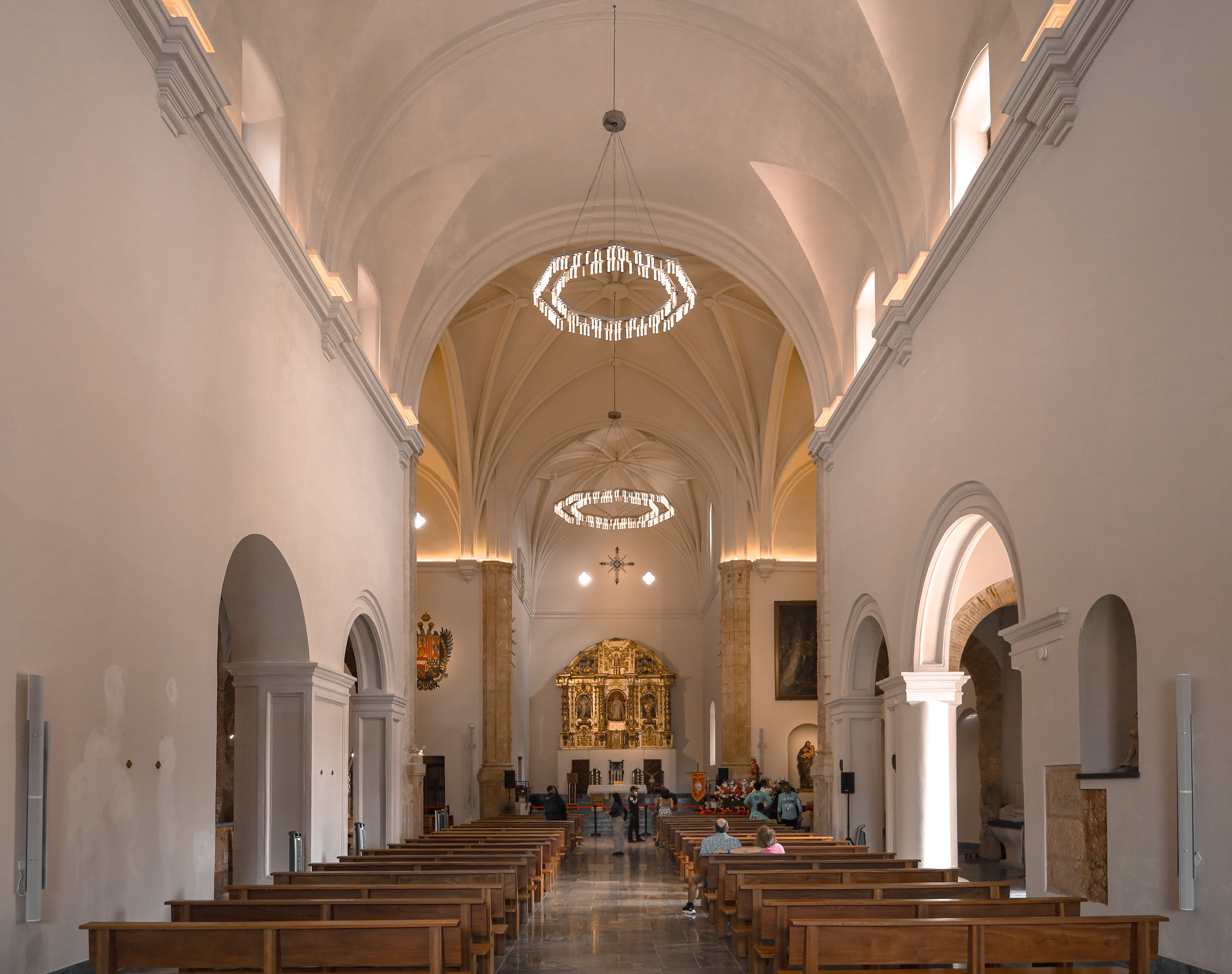
Central nave

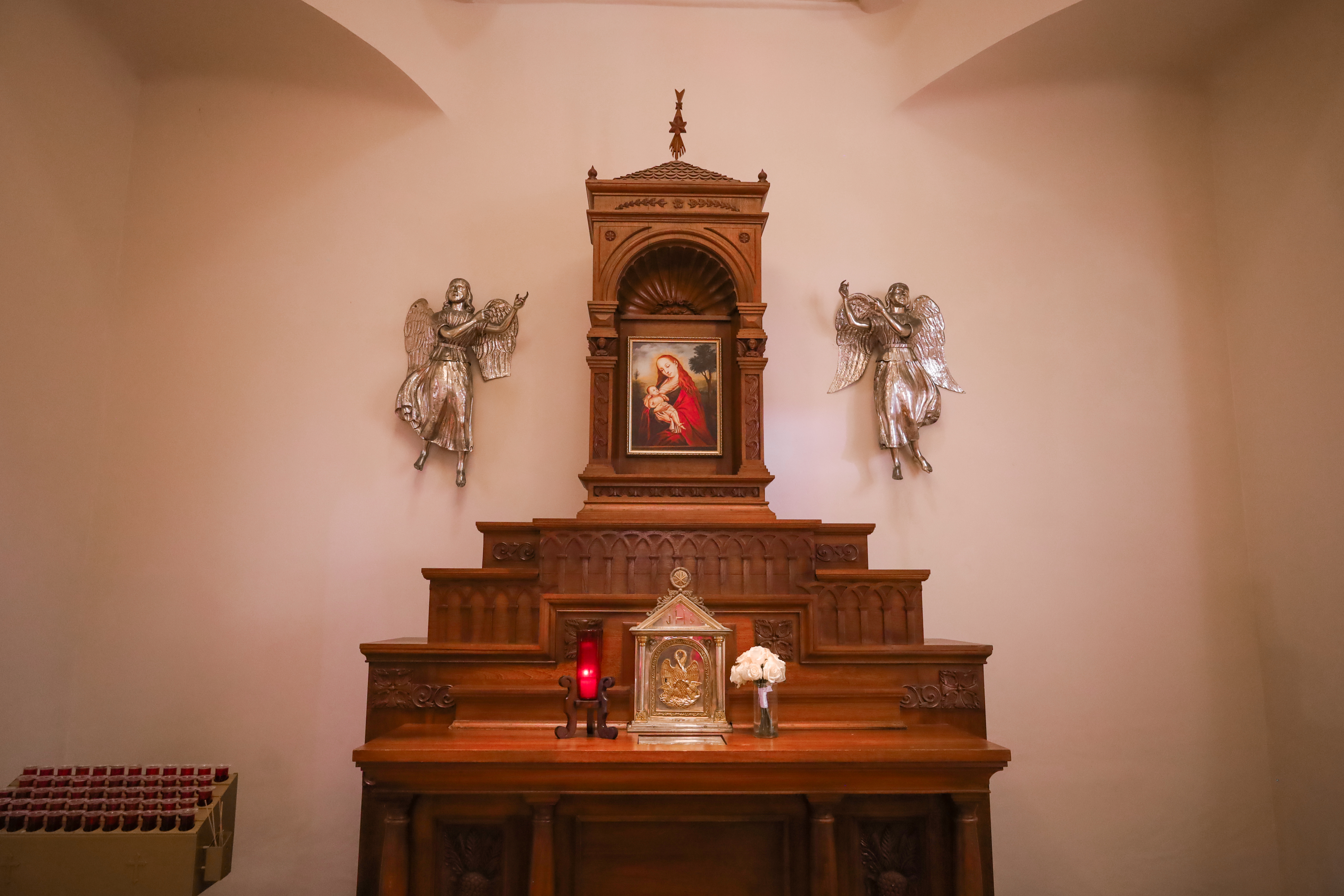
Our Lady of Bethlehem replica and chapel

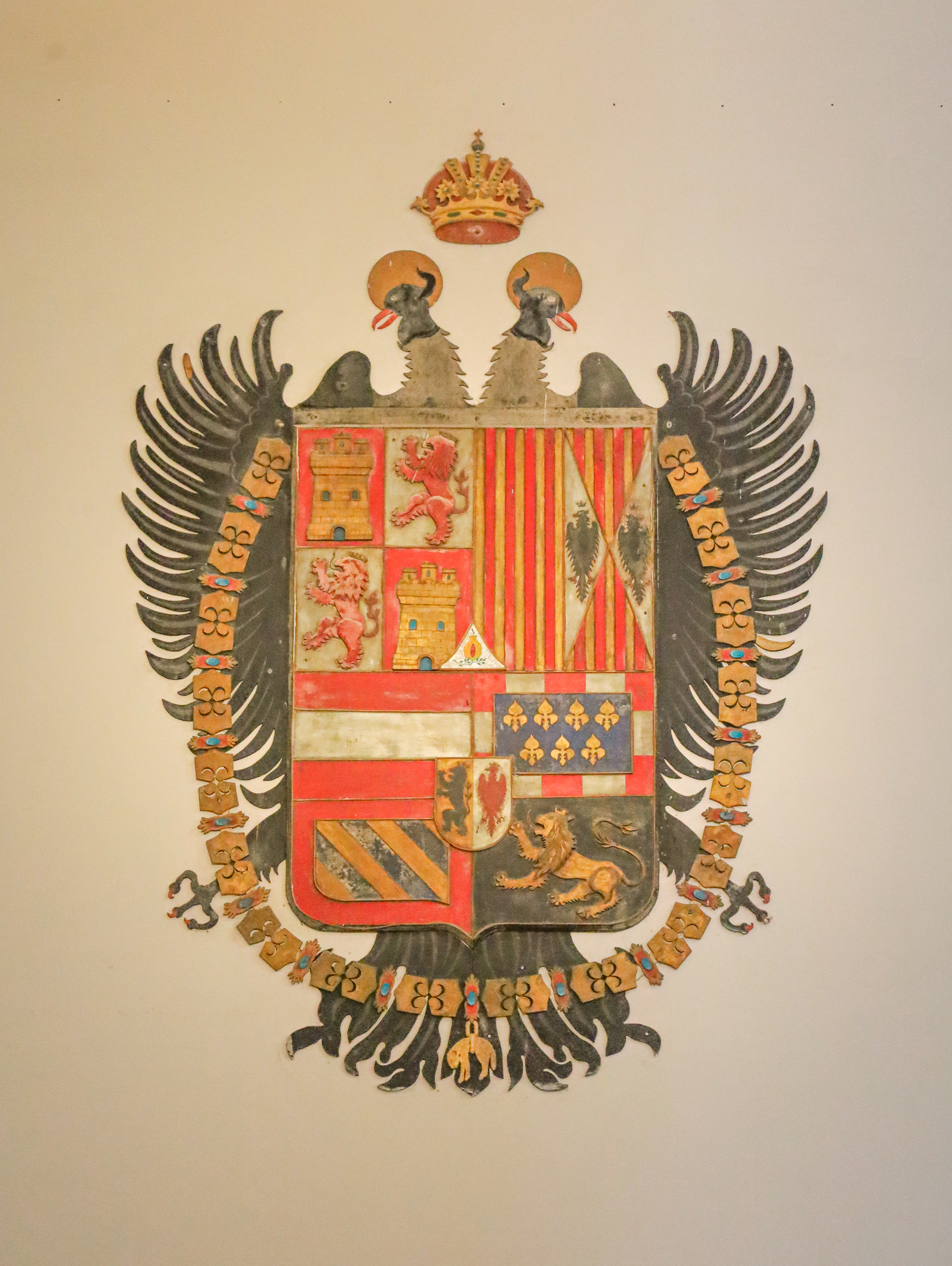
Reproduction of the Reichsadler of Habsburg Spain by the altar

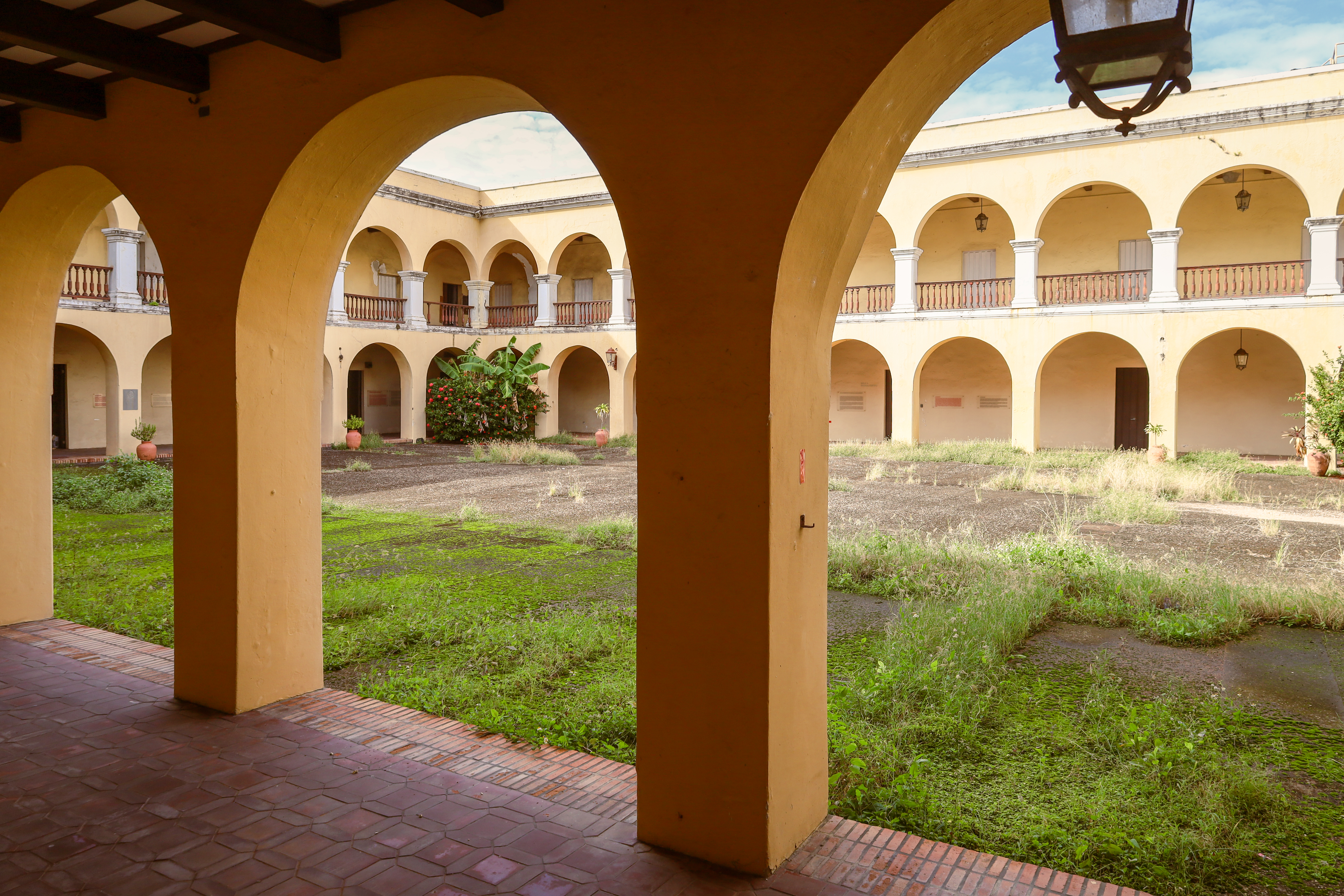
View of the former convent

== See also ==
- Galería Nacional, former convent that San José Church used to be part of
- Capilla del Cristo
- Casa Blanca (San Juan)
- Cathedral of San Juan
- List of the oldest buildings in Puerto Rico
- Inventory of Historic Churches of Puerto Rico
