= José Campeche =

Puerto Rican visual artist

José Campeche y Jordán
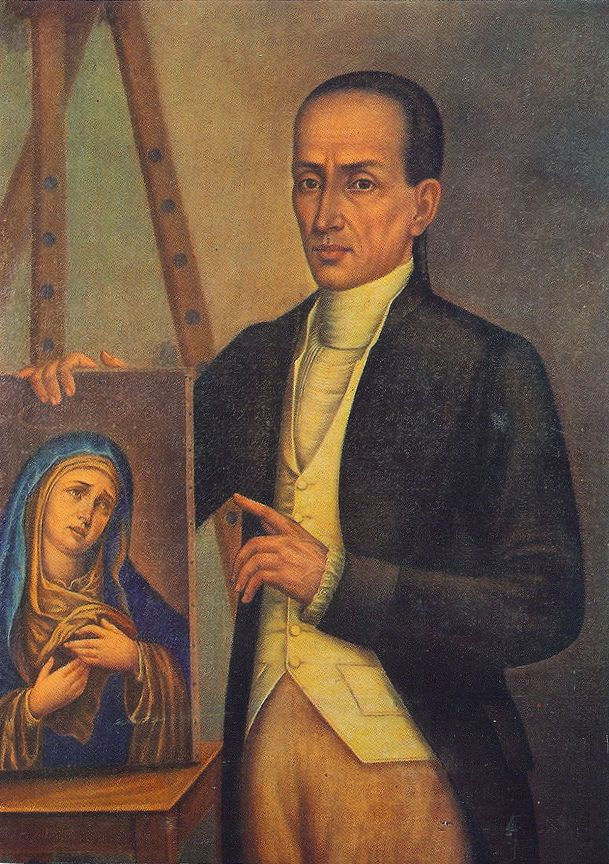
- Copy of José Campeche Self-portrait
- Born: José Campeche Jordán; December 3, 1751; San Juan, Puerto Rico
- Died: November 7, 1809 (aged 57); San Juan, Puerto Rico
- Education: Trained by Luis Paret y Alcázar
- Known for: Painting
- Notable work: Virgen de la Soledad de la Victoria; Our Lady of Bethlehem; The Virgin of the Rosary; Saint John the Baptist; The Sacred Family; The Bishop of San Francisco de la Cuerda; The Vision of Saint Anthony; The Shipwreck of Power in honor of Ramón Power y Giralt
- Movement: Rococo

José Campeche y Jordán (December 23, 1751 – November 7, 1809) is the first known Puerto Rican visual artist and considered by art critics as one of the best Rococo artists in the Americas. Campeche y Jordán loved to use colors that referenced the landscape of Puerto Rico, as well as the social and political crème de la crème.

== Early life ==
Campeche was born in San Juan, Puerto Rico. His parents were Tomás Campeche (1701–1780) and María Jordán y Marqués. His father was a freed slave-born in Puerto Rico and his mother was a native of the Canary Islands, so he was therefore considered to be mulato. His father was a gilder who restored and painted religious statues, and had an influence on the young Campeche's interest in the arts. Campeche was trained by Luis Paret y Alcázar, a Spanish court painter banished from Spain.

== Paintings ==
In addition to his public work on churches and chapels throughout the island, Campeche distinguished himself with his paintings related to religious themes and of governors and other important figures. His work forms part of the art collections in the Ponce Museum of Art (MAP) and the Museum of Art of Puerto Rico (MAPR) in San Juan. Another large bulk of his work forms part of the Teodoro Vidal Collection of Puerto Rican History of the Smithsonian American Art Museum. His most famous paintings and his best known portraits are of:

- Juan Alejo de Arizmendi
- Our Lady of Bethlehem
- Portrait of Brigadier don Ramón de Castro y Gutiérrez
- Portrait of Governor don Miguel Antonio de Ustáriz
- Saint John the Baptist
- The Bishop of San Francisco de la Cuerda
- The Rescue of Don Ramón Power y Giralt
- The Sacred Family
- The Virgin of the Rosary
- The Vision of Saint Anthony
- Virgen de la Soledad de la Victoria
- Doña María de los Dolores Gutiérrez del Mazo y Pérez, ca. 1796.
Selected works

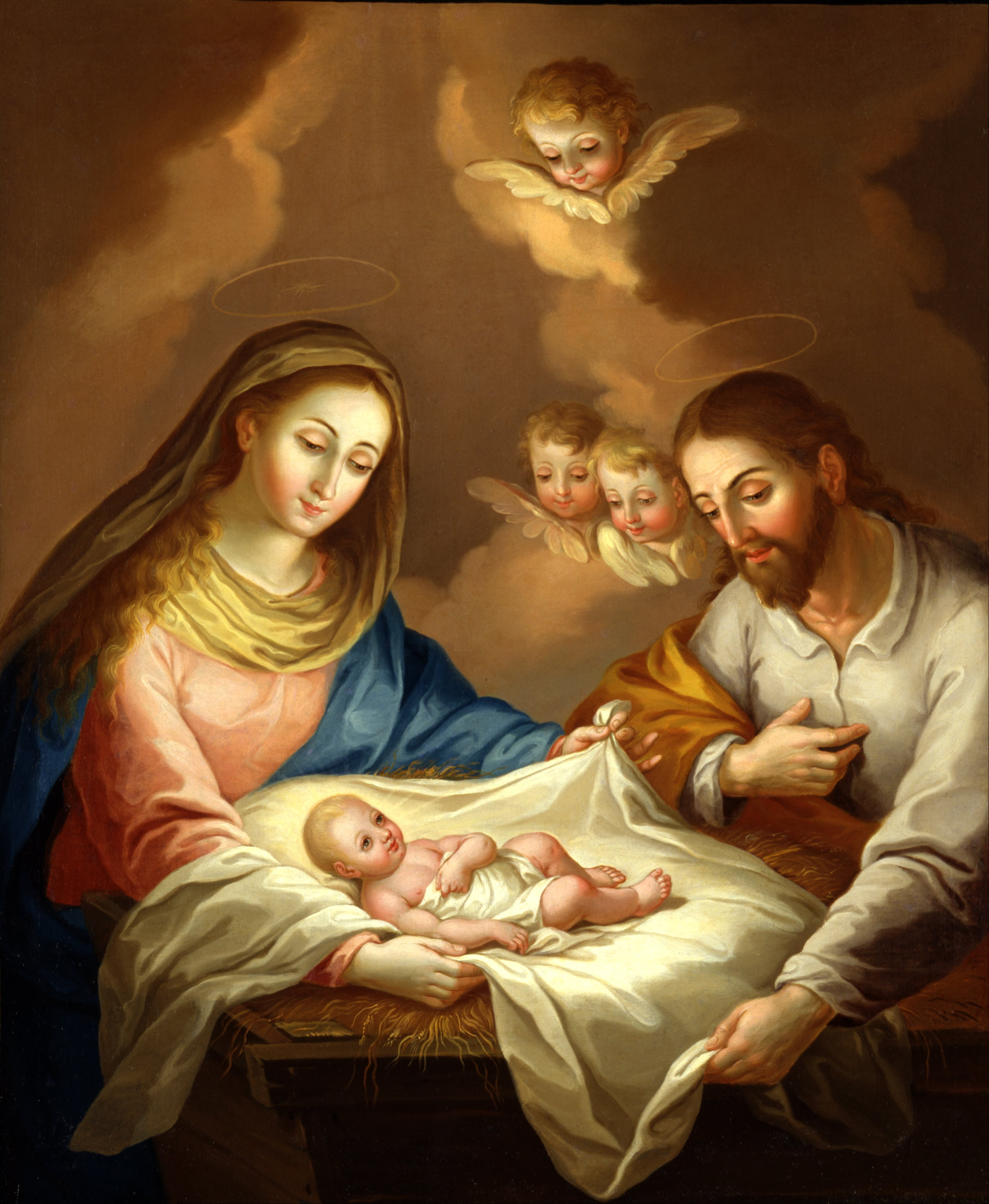
La Natividad (late 18th century) Smithsonian

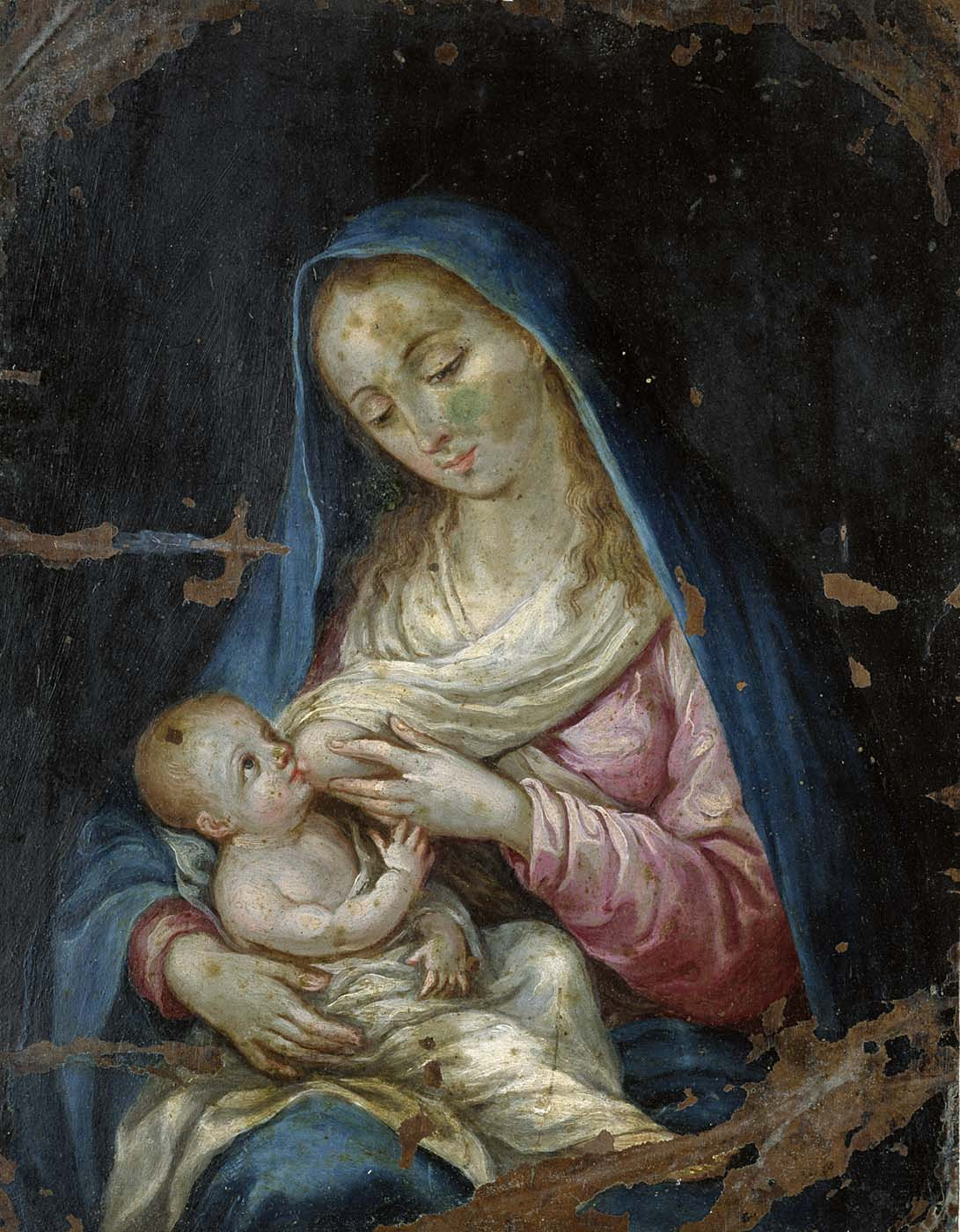
Our Lady of Bethlehem (late 18th century) Smithsonian

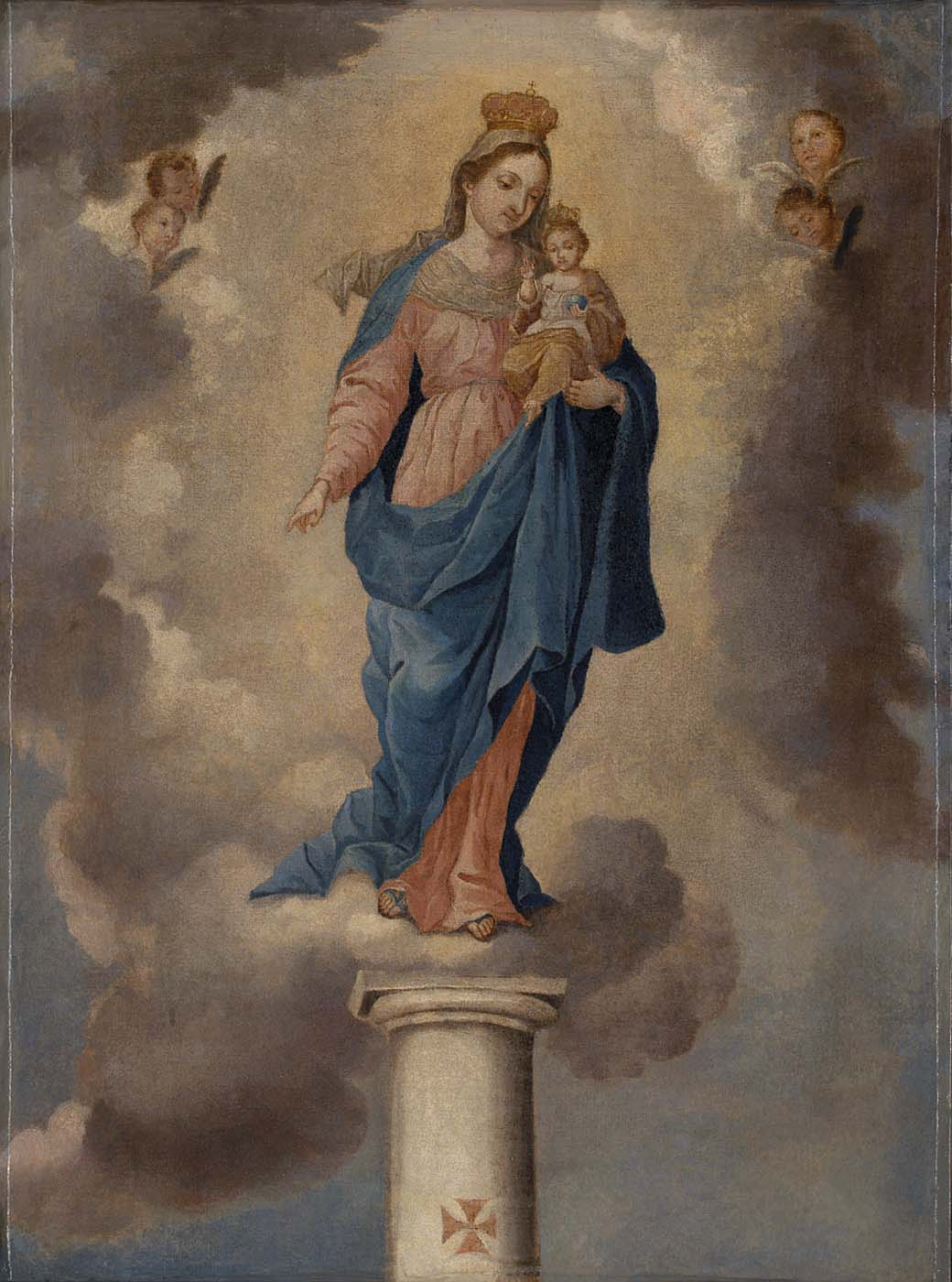
Our Lady of the Pillar (late 18th century) Smithsonian

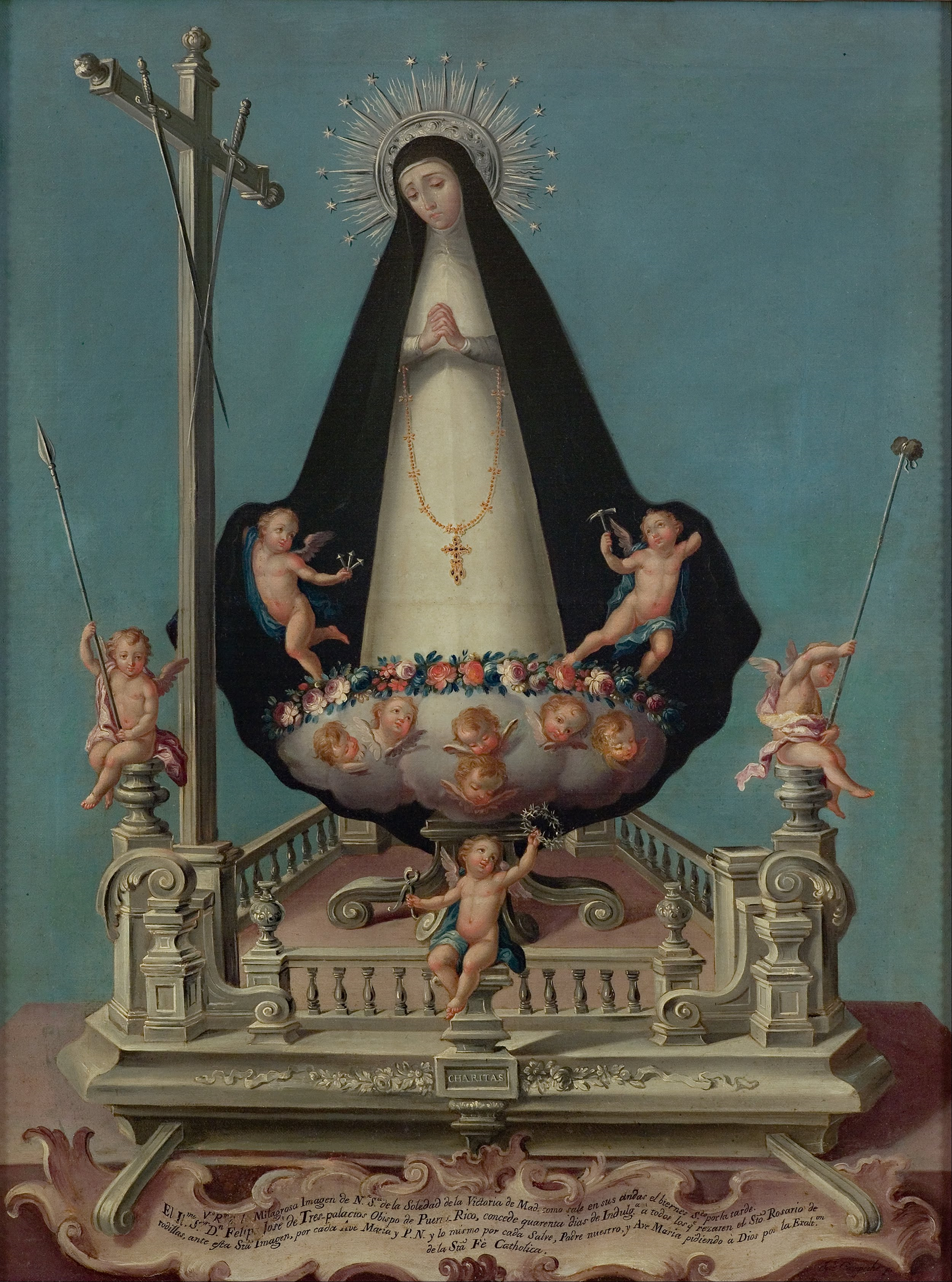
Virgen de la Soledad de la Victoria (1782–89) MAPR

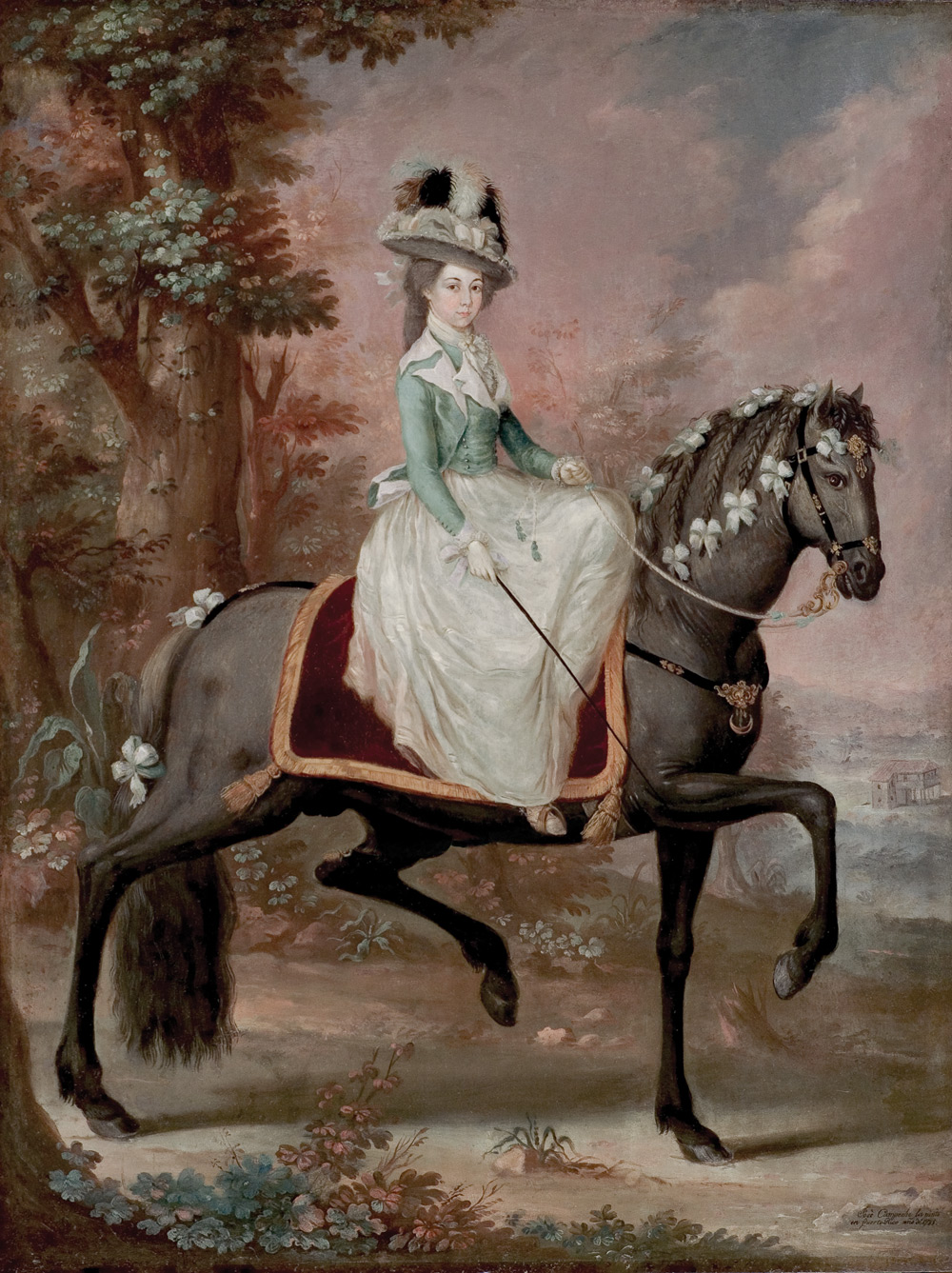
Dama a caballo (1785) MAP

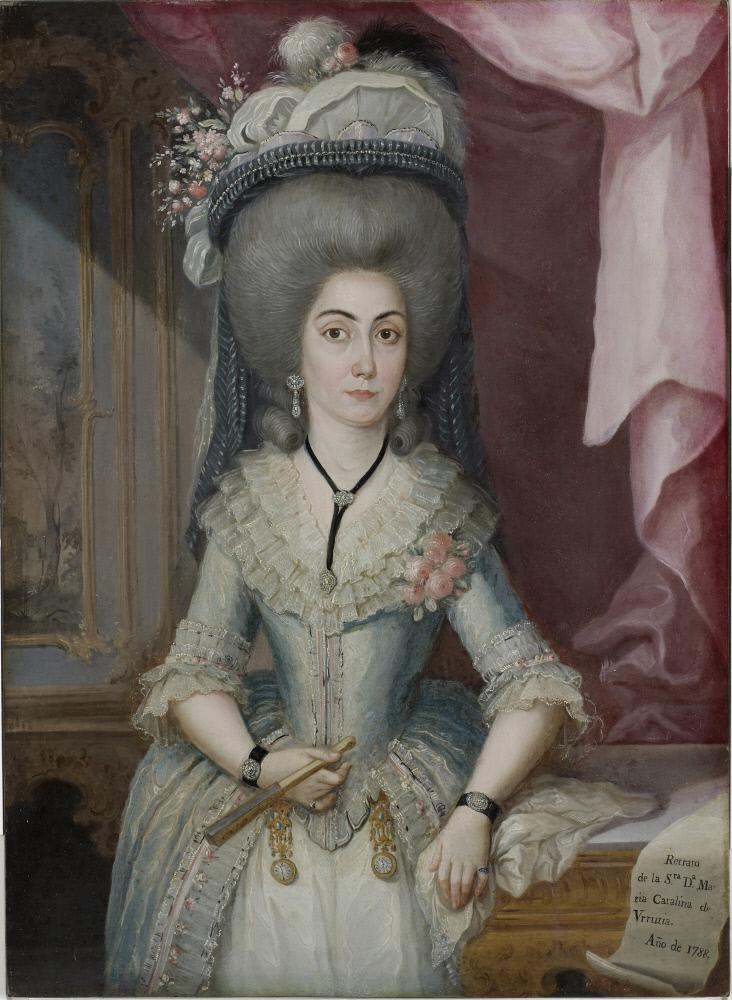
Doña María Catalina de Urrutia (1788) Hispanic Society of America

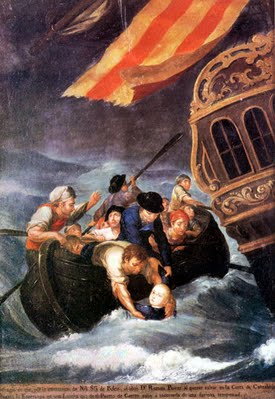
The Rescue of Don Ramón Power y Giralt (1790) Archdiocese of San Juan

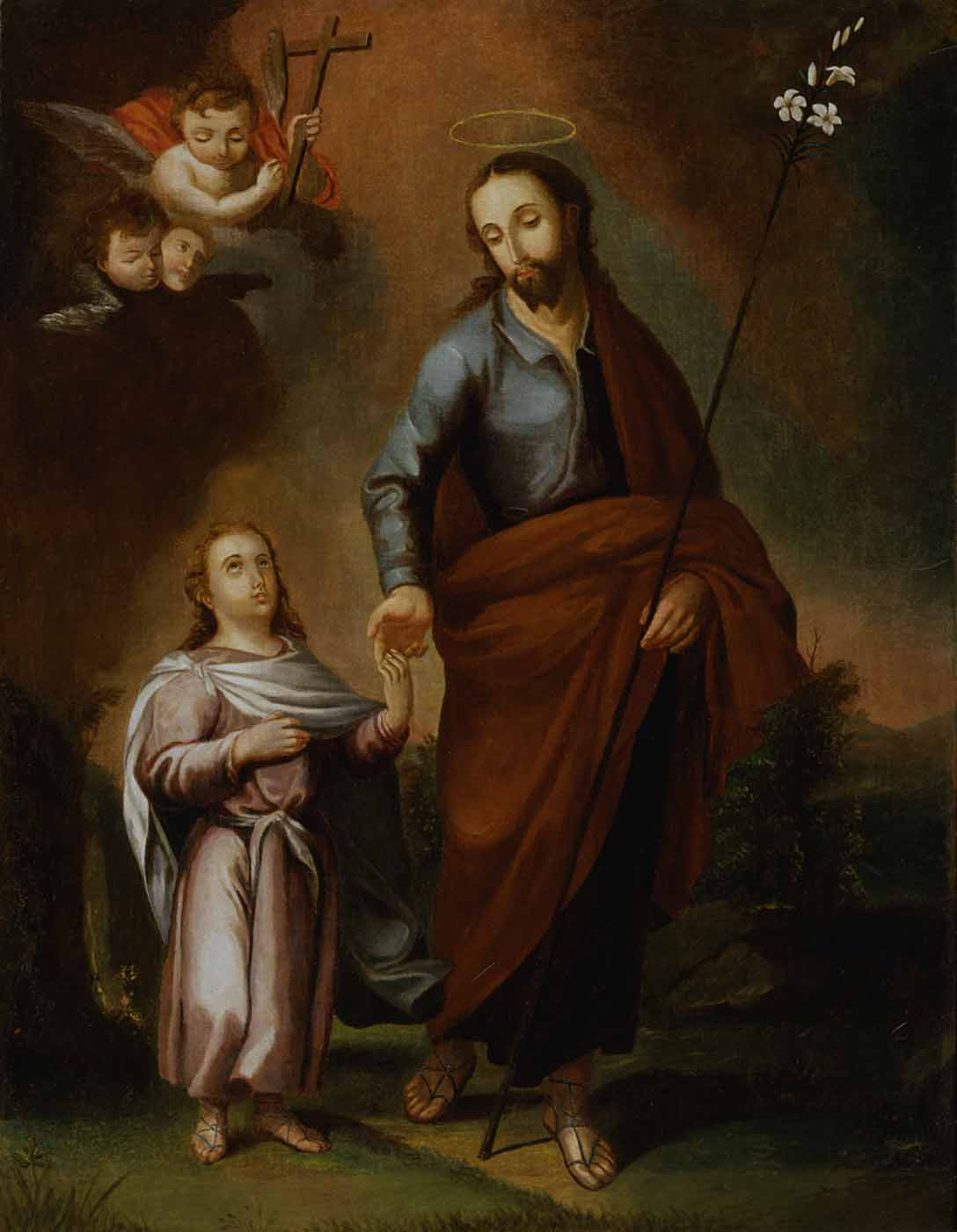
San José y el Cristo Niño (c. 1794) Smithsonian

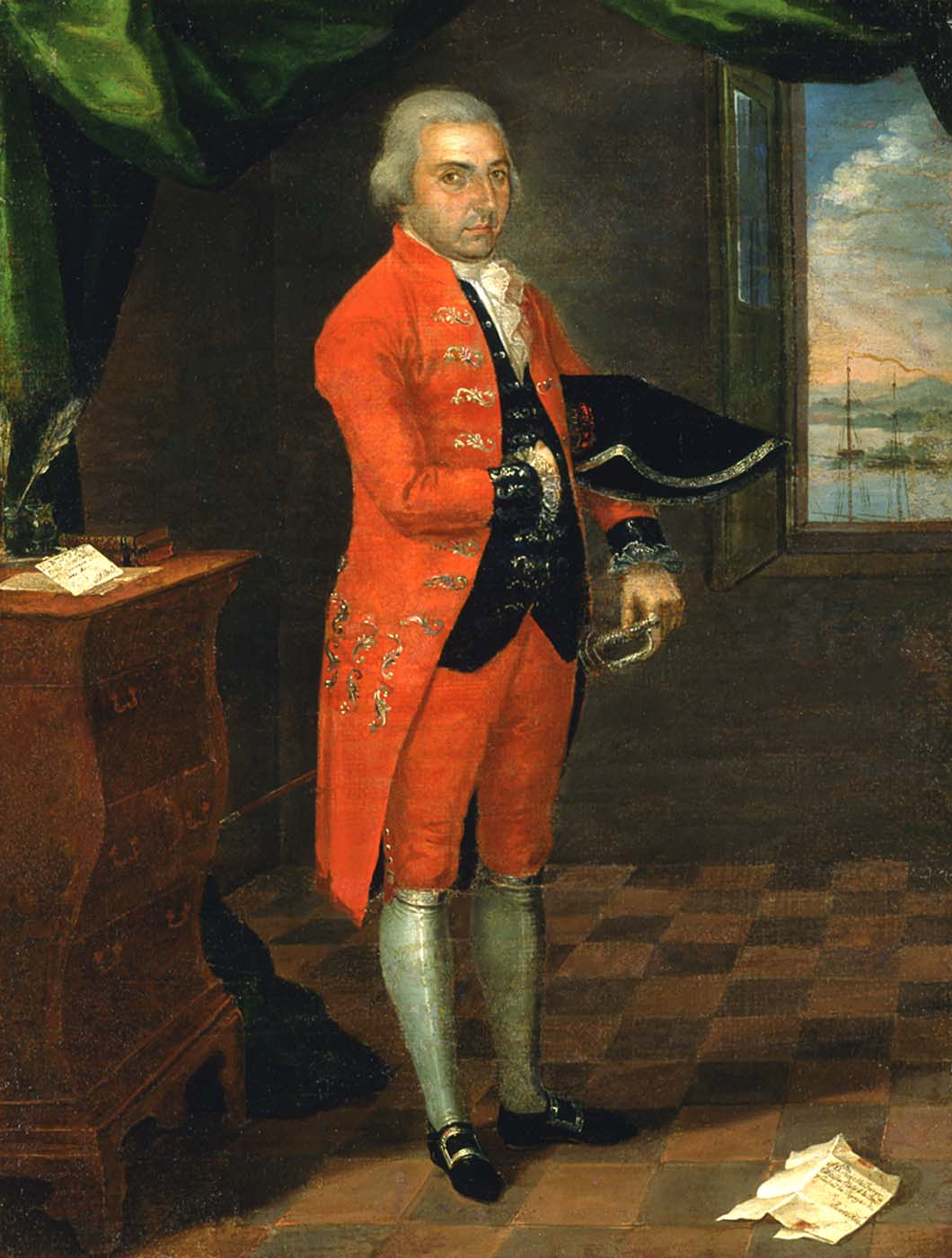
Don Jose Mas Ferrer (c. 1795) Smithsonian

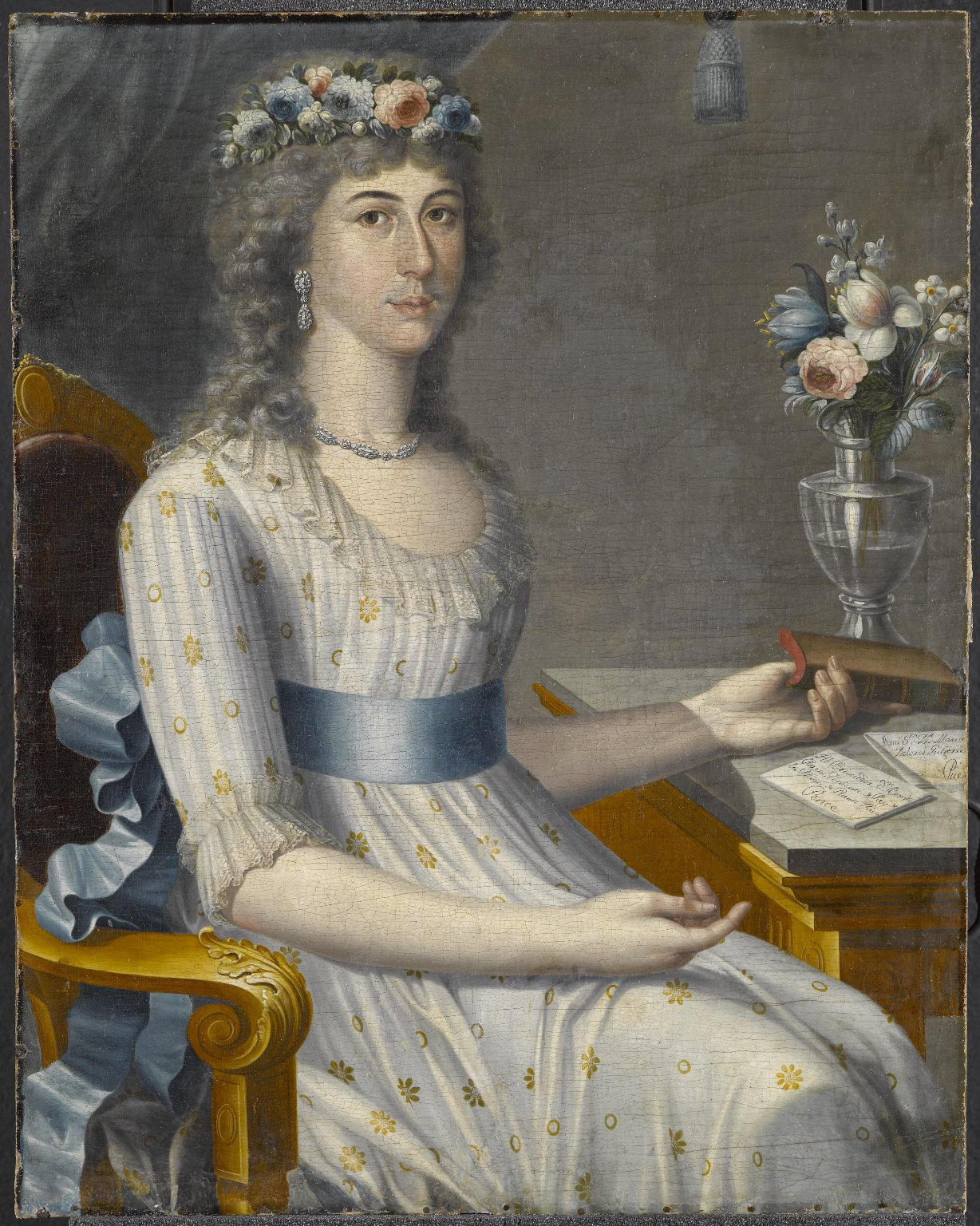
Doña María de los Dolores Gutiérrez del Mazo y Pérez (c. 1796) Brooklyn Museum

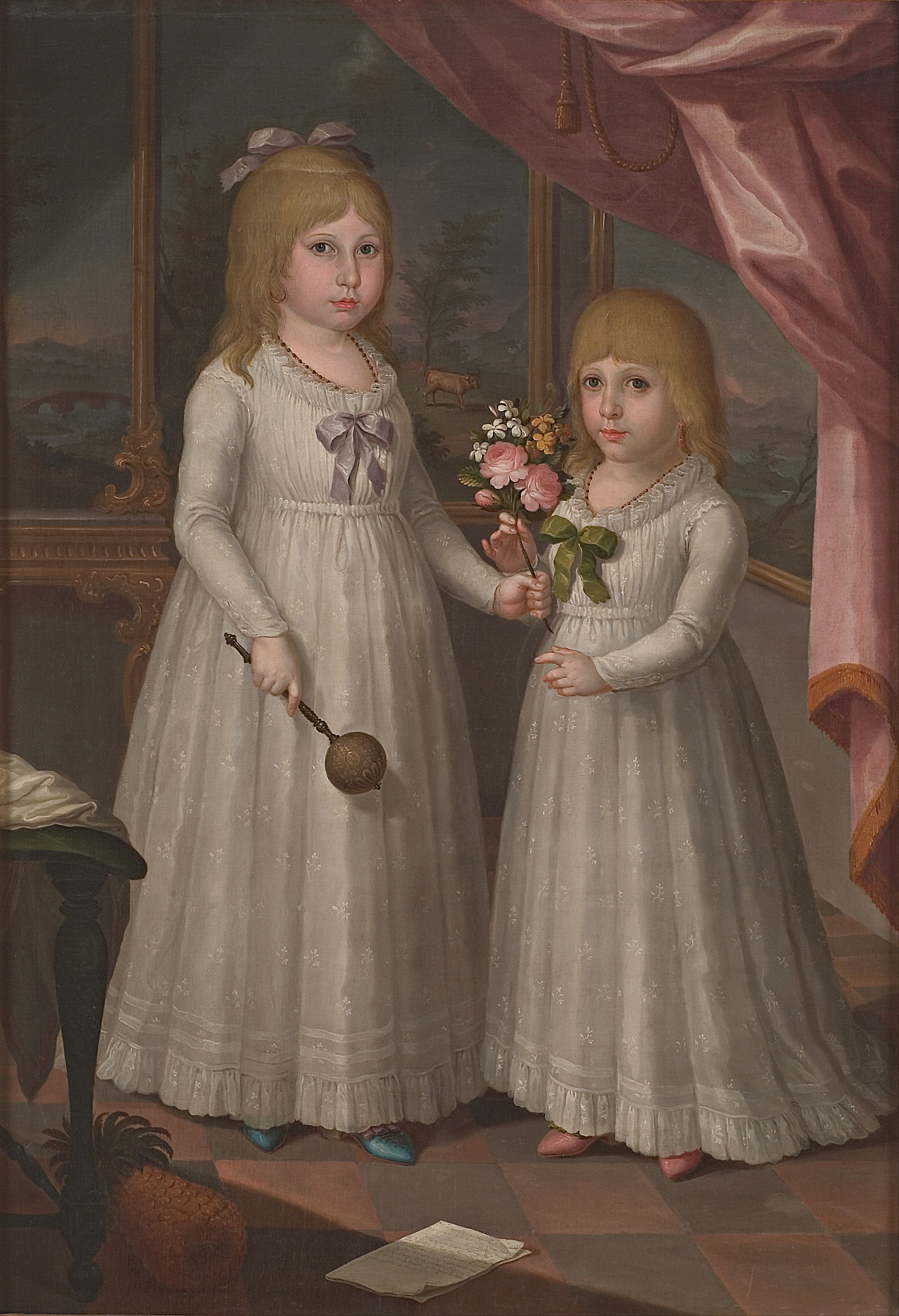
The Daughters of Governor Ramón de Castro (1797) MAPR

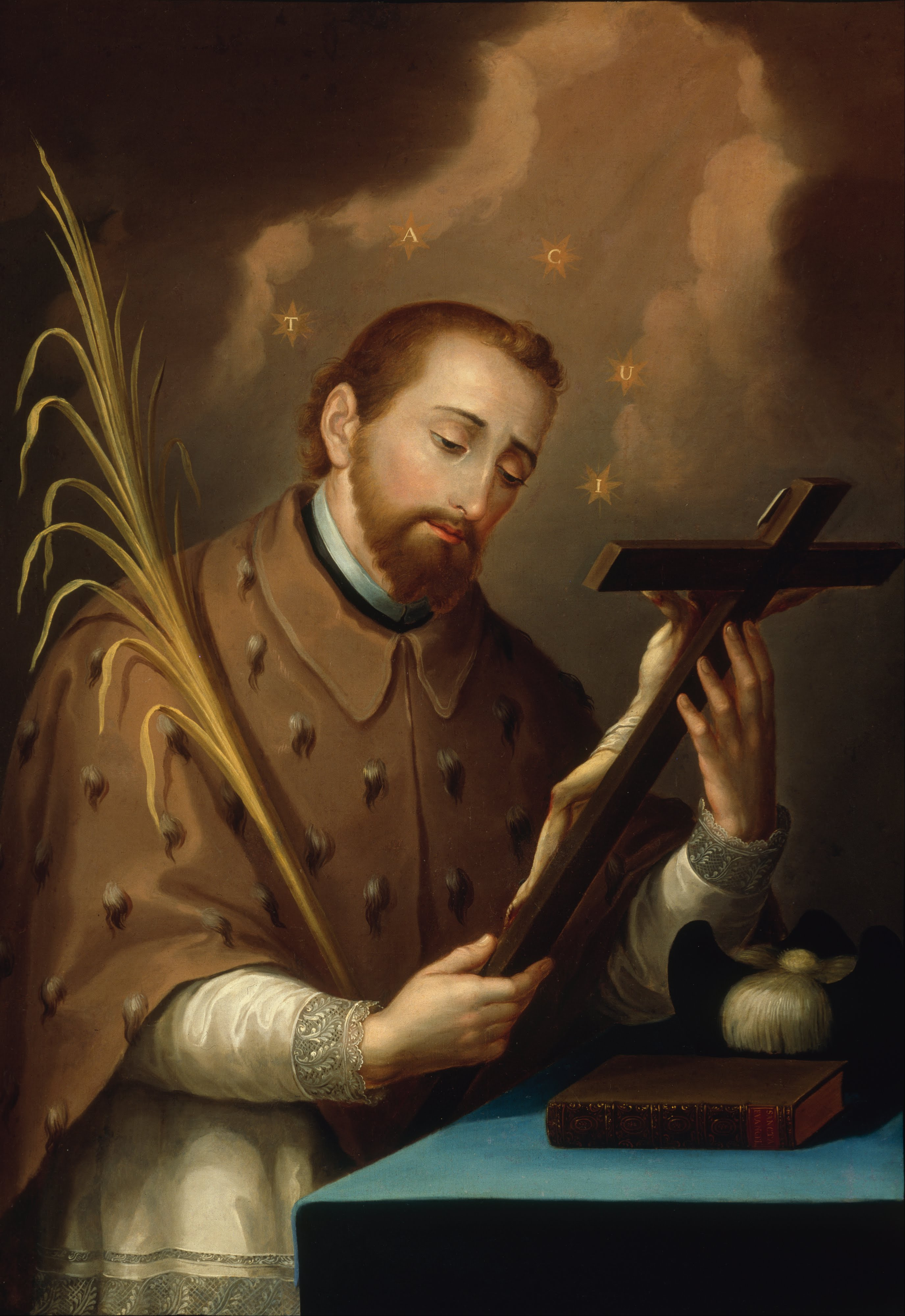
Saint John of Nepomuk (c. 1798) Smithsonian

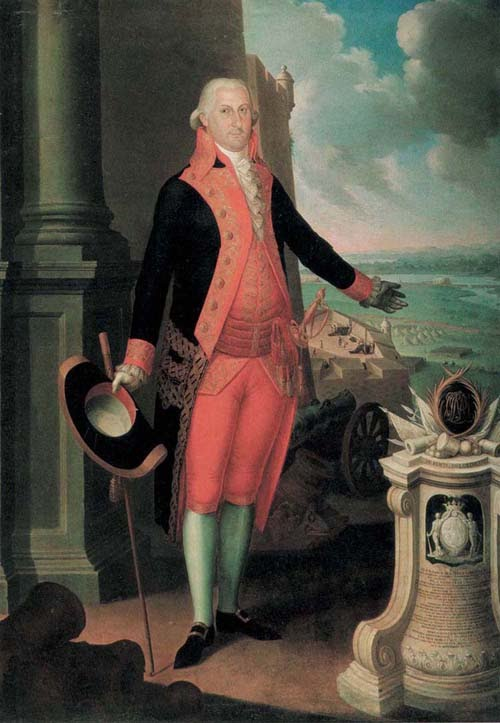
Governor Don Ramón de Castro (1800) MAP

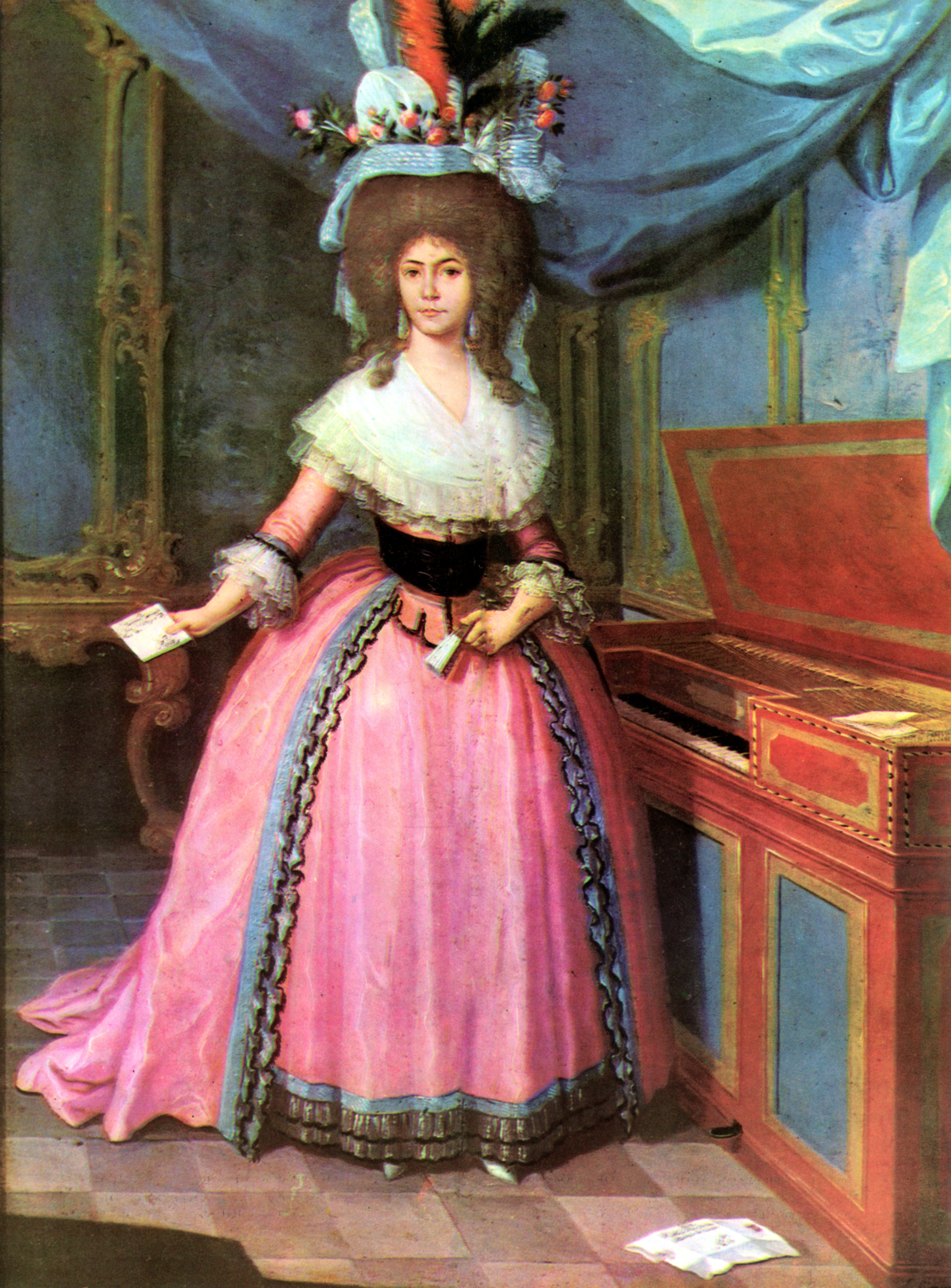
María de los Dolores Martínez de Carvajal (c. 1800) San Antonio Museum Art

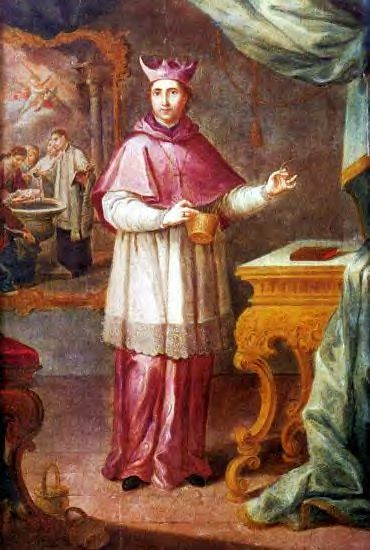
Juan Alejo de Arizmendi (c. 1803) Smithsonian

Portrait of a Woman in Mourning (María Teresa Tobía y Bazán de Castro (c. 1805) Thoma Foundation

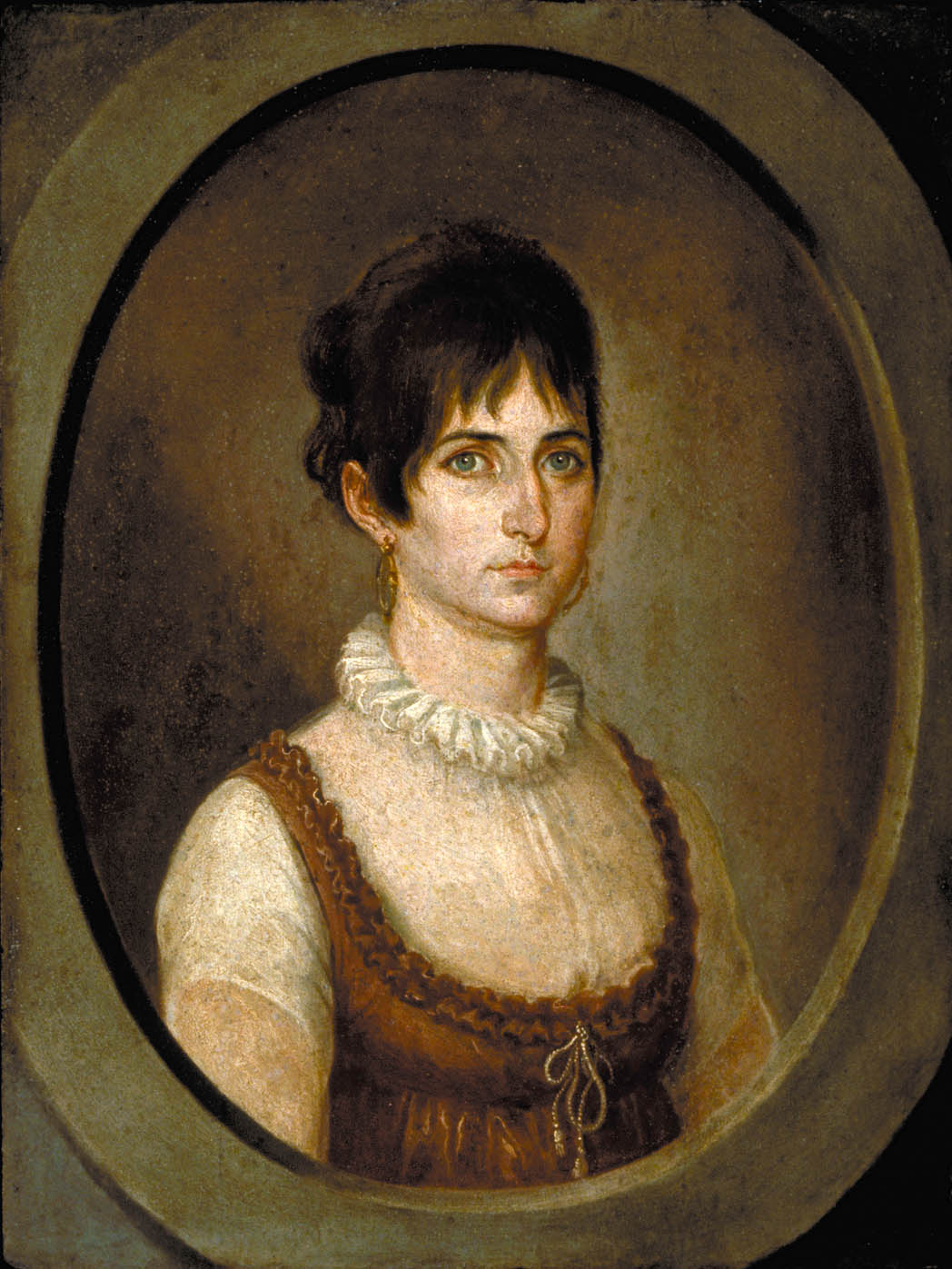
Isabel O'Daly (1808) Smithsonian

== Importance ==
Not only did the Puerto Rican society of the time appreciate Campeche's personal and artistic merits but he is now considered to be amongst the most gifted rococo artists in the Americas. His works of art can be found in museums, churches and chapels, such as Capilla del Cristo in San Juan, and in private collections in Puerto Rico and Venezuela. Campeche died in the city of San Juan on November 7, 1809.

José Campeche is also the namesake of Campechada, an annual cultural event dedicated to promotion and preservation of the arts, music and cultural heritage of Puerto Rico that was founded by the Institute of Puerto Rican Culture and has been celebrated since 2011.

High-resolution images of works of art from Puerto Rico's museums are being digitized and made available online with the help of the Institute, Google Arts & Culture, Lin Manuel Miranda and other stakeholders. 350 such works were available online by November 7, 2019 including many works by José Campeche.

== Commemorations ==
- There is a "José Campeche room" in the former Dominican Convent (today part of the Galería Nacional) in Old San Juan, Puerto Rico, where some of his works can be seen..
- Puerto Rico has various schools and avenues named after Campeche to honor his memory. The José Campeche High School is located in San Lorenzo.
- Manuel Gregorio Tavárez composed a funeral march "Redención" in Campeche's honor.
- Puerto Rican graphic artist Lorenzo Homar also created a work of art commemorating Campeche.
- Campeche is buried in the San José Church in Old San Juan.

== See also ==
- African immigration to Puerto Rico
- List of Puerto Ricans
