= Puerto Rican art =

Puerto Rican art is the diverse historic collection of visual and hand-crafted arts originating from the island. The art of the Puerto Ricans (Spanish: puertorriqueños or boricuas) draws from the various cultural traditions of the indigenous Taino people, as well as the history of the island as the subject of various other nations.

== Santos ==
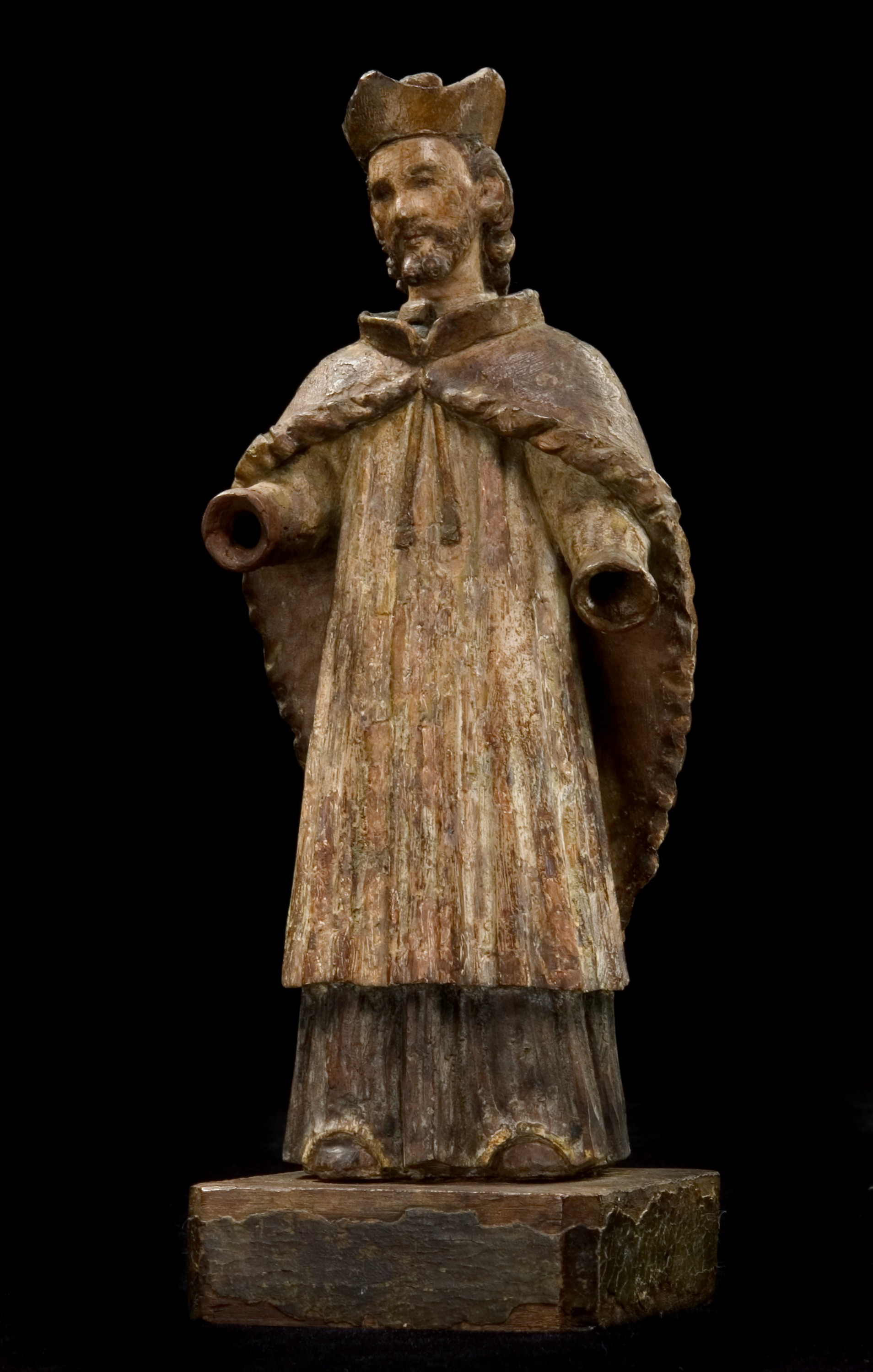
San Juan Nepomuceno Santo statuette by Felipe de la Espada, born in San Germán, Puerto Rico ca. 1754

When the Spanish first arrived in Puerto Rico, one of their primary tools in converting the indigenous Taíno population were statuettes, known as Santos, depicting the Virgin Mary, Jesus Christ, and other Catholic icons (the practice of religious sculpture already existed on the island through the Taínos’ use of cemí figures). As there were not many churches and missionaries during the early years of Spanish occupation, Santos were crucial in establishing the Catholic faith in Puerto Rico, as the converts would use the Santos in domestic settings for various religious purposes. Early craftsmen of these Santos, known as santeros (or santeras, if female) would primarily create the figures by using Spanish cedarwood, clay, or stone, and applying oil paints, and were heavily influenced by the Spanish Baroque style, with the early Santo figures being elaborately detailed with dramatic expressions.

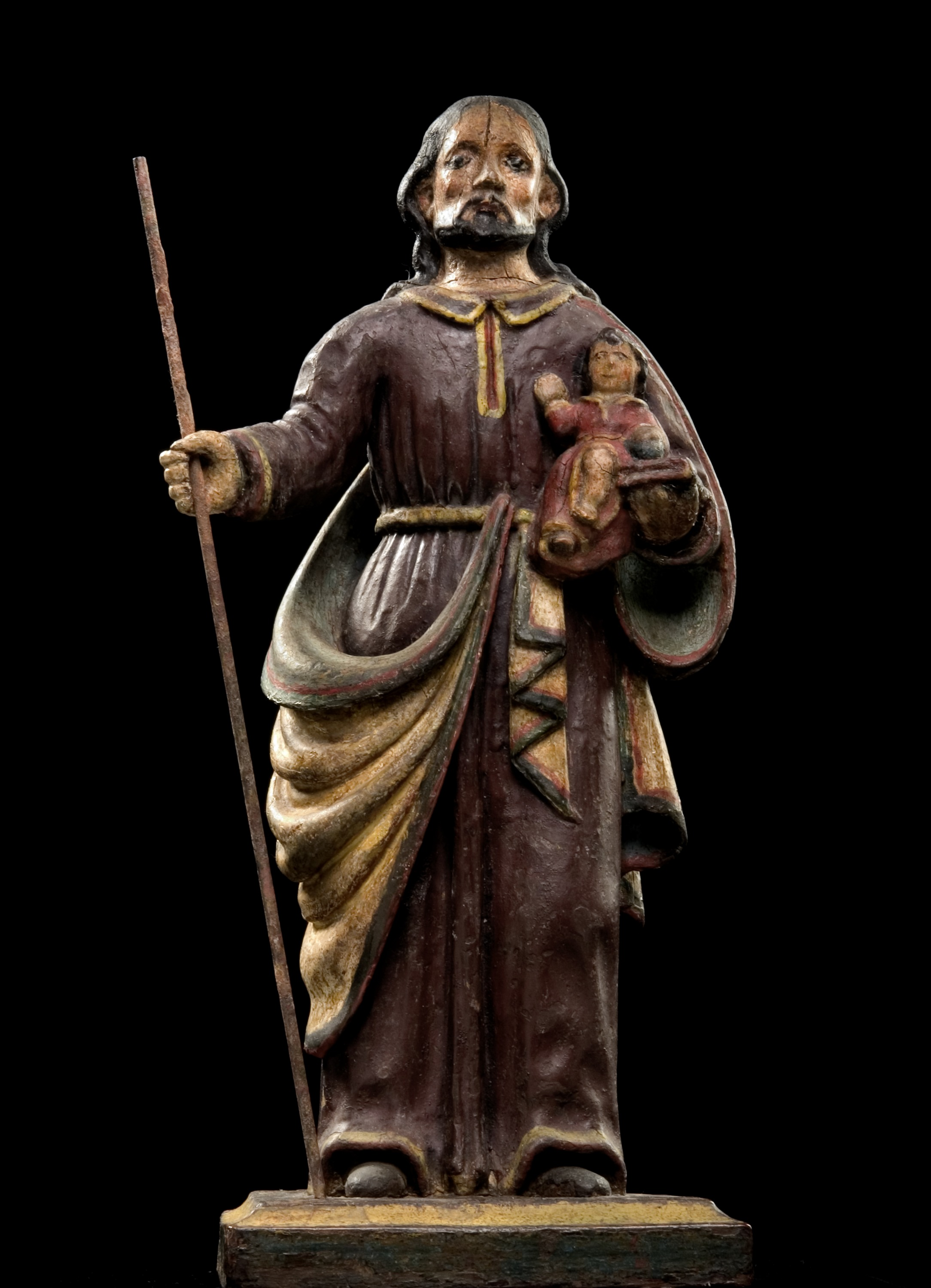
San Jose y el Niño, ca. 1845 Santo statuette by Tiburcio de la Espada, born in San Germán, Puerto Rico

Many Santos were adorned with aureolas (halos), though depictions of Jesus exclusively used a three-pointed halo referred to as the Tres Potencias. In the years after Spanish Colonialism, Santos moved away from the Baroque style and into roughly 2 categories: Autoctono and Contemporary. Autoctono (Native) is characterized by local Puerto Rican colors and simple, childlike features, while Contemporary is a broader category reflective of Santos that are made without necessarily having a direct mystical or religious influence. Santos vary in size, but are usually around eight to twenty inches tall. Over the years, Santos have become a very personal and important tradition in many Puerto Rican households: they are housed in special wooden boxes called nichos where people pray for assistance and protection, and families often pass down collections of Santos (for instance, depictions of the Nativity Scene) for future generations to add new figures and restore old ones. After the 1898 United States invasion of Puerto Rico, Santos as a handmade craft somewhat reduced in popularity, as Protestant missionaries called for converts to dispose of and destroy the figures, and general modernizations on the island led to a reduced interest in this long-standing tradition. As a result, plastic, mass-produced statuettes of Catholic figures have become more popular as an alternative to traditional Santos craftsmanship.

In October 2021 the twentieth meeting of Santo carvers was held at the Institute of Puerto Rican Culture in Old San Juan, Puerto Rico.

== Caretas ==
Caretas (masks), which are worn during carnivals, are also popular. Similar masks signifying evil spirits were used in both Spain and Africa, though for different purposes. The Spanish used their masks to frighten lapsed Christians into returning to the church, while tribal Africans used them as protection from the evil spirits they represented. Puerto Rican caretas always bear at least several horns and fangs, true to their historical origins. While they are usually constructed of papier-mâché, coconut shells and fine metal screening are sometimes used as well. Though red and black were originally the typical colors for caretas, their palette has expanded to include a wide variety of bright hues and patterns.

== Visual arts ==
Perhaps the strongest Spanish influence on Puerto Rican arts was in painting. During the colonial period, native-born painters emulated classic European styles. The first of these artists to gain international acclaim, José Campeche, learned techniques from both his father, who was a former slave who had purchased his freedom by carving altarpieces, and from exiled Spanish artist Luis Paret. His work concentrated on religious themes and portraits of important citizens in Spanish Rococo style. Still regarded as one of the most important 18th-century painter in the Americas, Campeche is also credited with creating the Puerto Rican national painting.

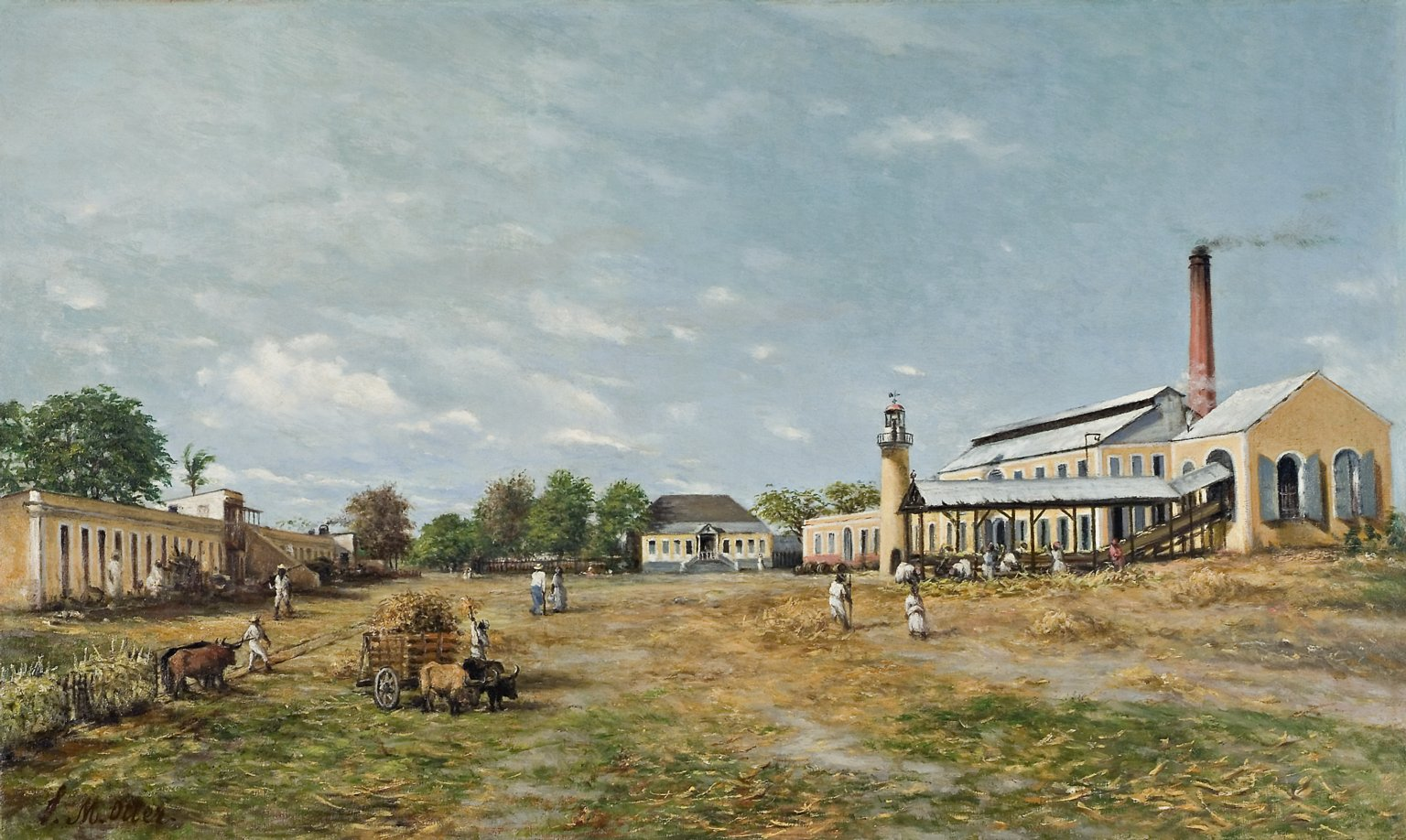
Hacienda La Fortuna by Francisco Oller (1885). Brooklyn Museum.

In the 19th century, Francisco Oller followed in Campeche's footsteps. Unlike Campeche, who never left Puerto Rico, Oller studied in both Madrid and Paris, which greatly influenced his work. Although his paintings often show an Impressionist or Realist style, he altered his style with each piece to suit the subject matter. Landscapes, portraits, and still lifes were all among his works. After moving back to Puerto Rico in 1884, Oller became interested in portraying Puerto Rican subject matter. He also founded an art academy and wrote a book on drawing and painting the natural world.

By the end of the 20th century, painting no longer defined Puerto Rican art as it once had. "A group of contemporary artists who came into maturity in the 1990s broke away from nationalistic agendas so crucial to previous generations of artists from Puerto Rico," according to curator Silvia Karman Cubiña. "Instead, their works are informed by more personal issues, as well as broader topics such as gender, consumerism, world history, film, and literature." The importance of artists such as Allora & Calzadilla, Daniel Lind-Ramos, Rosado Seijo, and Arnaldo Morales was "their social dimension and the potential for interaction with others." For others such as Manuel Acevedo, Javier Cambre, Nayda Collazo-Llorens, and Carlos Rivera Villafañe, it was their multi-media and site-specific installations that expanded on the "nontraditional modes begun in earlier generations, by artists such as Rafael Ferrer and Rafael Montañez Ortiz, and then Antonio Martorell, José Morales, Pepón Osorio," and Beatriz Santiago Muñoz.

== Street Art ==
In recent years, Puerto Rico has become a hub of urban and street art scenes. This can be seen in movements like Santurce es Ley, Yaucromatic (Yauco), Grito de artes (Lares) and Ponce es Ley. Both of these movements showcase art which embodies cultural and social elements through a modern lens.

== See also ==
- Cultural diversity in Puerto Rico
- List of Puerto Ricans
- History of Puerto Rico
- Miguel Pou
- Santurce es Ley
- Yaucromatic
