= Tourism in Puerto Rico =

Tourism in Puerto Rico attracts millions of visitors each year, with more than 5.1 million passengers arriving at the Luis Muñoz Marín International Airport in 2022, a 6.5% increase from 2021, the main point of arrival into the island of Puerto Rico. With a $8.9 billion revenue in 2022 (a 39% increase over the previous high in 2019), tourism has been a very important source of revenue for Puerto Rico for a number of decades given its favorable warm climate, beach destinations and its diversity of natural wonders, cultural and historical sites, festivals, concerts and sporting events. As Puerto Rico is an unincorporated territory of the United States, U.S. citizens do not need a passport to enter Puerto Rico, and the ease of travel attracts many tourists from the mainland U.S. each year.

In 2017, Hurricane Maria caused severe damage to the island and its infrastructure. The damage was estimated at $100 billion. An April 2019 report indicated that by that time, only a few hotels were still closed, that life for tourists in and around the capital had, for the most part, returned to normal. By October 2019, nearly all of the popular amenities for tourists, in the major destinations such as San Juan, Ponce and Arecibo, were in operation on the island and tourism was rebounding. This was important for the economy, since tourism provides up 10% of Puerto Rico's GDP, according to Discover Puerto Rico. The COVID-19 pandemic in 2020, however, greatly affected this gradual recovery, and it was not until 2022 that tourism numbers would demonstrate a concrete recovery of the tourism industry in the island.

== History ==
The inauguration of the Condado Vanderbilt Hotel on 16 October 1919 marked the beginning of upscale tourism in Puerto Rico. According to Dennis Merrill, author of Negotiating Cold War Paradise: U.S. Tourism, Economic Planning, and Cultural Modernity in Twentieth-Century Puerto Rico, the tourism industry in the Caribbean is viewed by its critics as causing host countries to practice economic subservience to the visitors of the islands. He highlights the U.S. attempt in the 1930s to make Puerto Rico an island destination for tourists to bring in a new source of revenue to the U.S. and help lift it out of economic depression. Travel guides and advertisements used at the time suggested that the people of Puerto Rico lived in poverty and wanted a chance to serve travelers from the United States.

The creation of the Caribe Hilton Hotel in San Juan in 1949 represented a partnership between the Puerto Rican government and private U.S businesses. American business viewed the creation of the hotel as a symbol of their power to create material progress. A majority of Puerto Rican citizens did not approve of the decision to build the hotel as they believed that the public funds would have better suited the island inhabitants if they were invested in improving education and social welfare. San Juan's fire chief of the time disapproved the local government's decision to degrade itself by buying tourists. Articles published by El Mundo in 1952 described American tourists as selfish people who did not care about the island and ones who will in the future convince the Puerto Rican people to serve them. In addition to beach holidays, gambling and casinos were some of the first tourist activities that were developed in the island. The gambling sector is also an important contributor to the tourism sector (employing 3,409 people, 2017 ), and it encompasses 20 casinos all attached to hotels and resorts acting as tourist destinations. It is mandatory, according to Puerto Rican law, that casinos must be attached to hotels and resorts, and must be located within "zones of historic or touristic interest" (Spanish: zonas históricas, antiguas o de interés turístico). Today there is a significant and growing Chinese presence in the Puerto Rico gambling sector, so far 10% of the casinos are owned by Chinese individuals or companies, and more are partially owned. The number of Chinese tourists is also on the rise: in 2019, contribution of travel and tourism to GDP (% of GDP) for Puerto Rico was 6.9%. However, the exact contribution of the gambling sector within the tourism and travel sector is not measured separately by the government.

In the 1950s, the focus of tourism shifted to cultural and natural heritage travel with the federal designation of the San Juan National Historic Site and the historic district of Old San Juan being restored by the Puerto Rican government in order to attract visitors interested in the colonial history of the island. The designation of La Fortaleza and San Juan National Historic Site in 1983 as the eleventh World Heritage Site under U.S. jurisdiction further helped cement San Juan as a national and international tourist destination. Ecotourism later grew with the establishment of visitor infrastructure in El Yunque National Forest, the only tropical rainforest in the National Forest Service system, and with the development of natural heritage tourist destinations in the form of state forests, recreational areas and parques nacionales, the Puerto Rican equivalent of state parks, between the 1950s and 1980s. Other tourist activities such as fishing also became popular in the second half of the 20th century with Puerto Rico being considered one of the best places in the world to catch Atlantic tarpon.

The tourism industry experienced moderate levels of growth in 2014, driven primarily by the introduction of new cruise lines and airfare activity and the development of new hotels on the island. In 2016, Puerto Rico was featured as a popular destination for business meetings, incentives, conferencing, and exhibitions, due to its modern convention center and district overlooking the Port of San Juan. Between 2017 and 2020, however, the tourism industry in Puerto Rico was greatly affected by events such as Hurricane Maria in 2017, the 2019 and 2020 earthquakes, and the COVID-19 pandemic in 2020. Additionally, during the 2019 government shutdown, the San Juan National Historic Site closed its two colonial-era fortresses of Castillo San Felipe del Morro and Castillo San Cristóbal to visitors.

As of 2025, nonstop flights to Puerto Rico are available year-round from domestic airports such as Atlanta, Austin, Baltimore, Boston, Charlotte, Chicago, Dallas/Fort Worth, Denver, Detroit, Fort Lauderdale, Houston, Miami, Minneapolis/St. Paul, Nashville, New York, Newark, Orlando, Philadelphia, Tampa, Washington, D.C., and several international airports, including Bogotá, Cancún, Madrid, Medellín, Montreal, Panama City, San José, and Toronto, as well as regional Caribbean destinations such as Port of Spain, Punta Cana, St. Croix, St. Maarten, St. Thomas, Santiago de los Caballeros, Santo Domingo, and Tortola.

=== Land Privatization, Ownership, and Impacts ===
==== Role of corporations ====
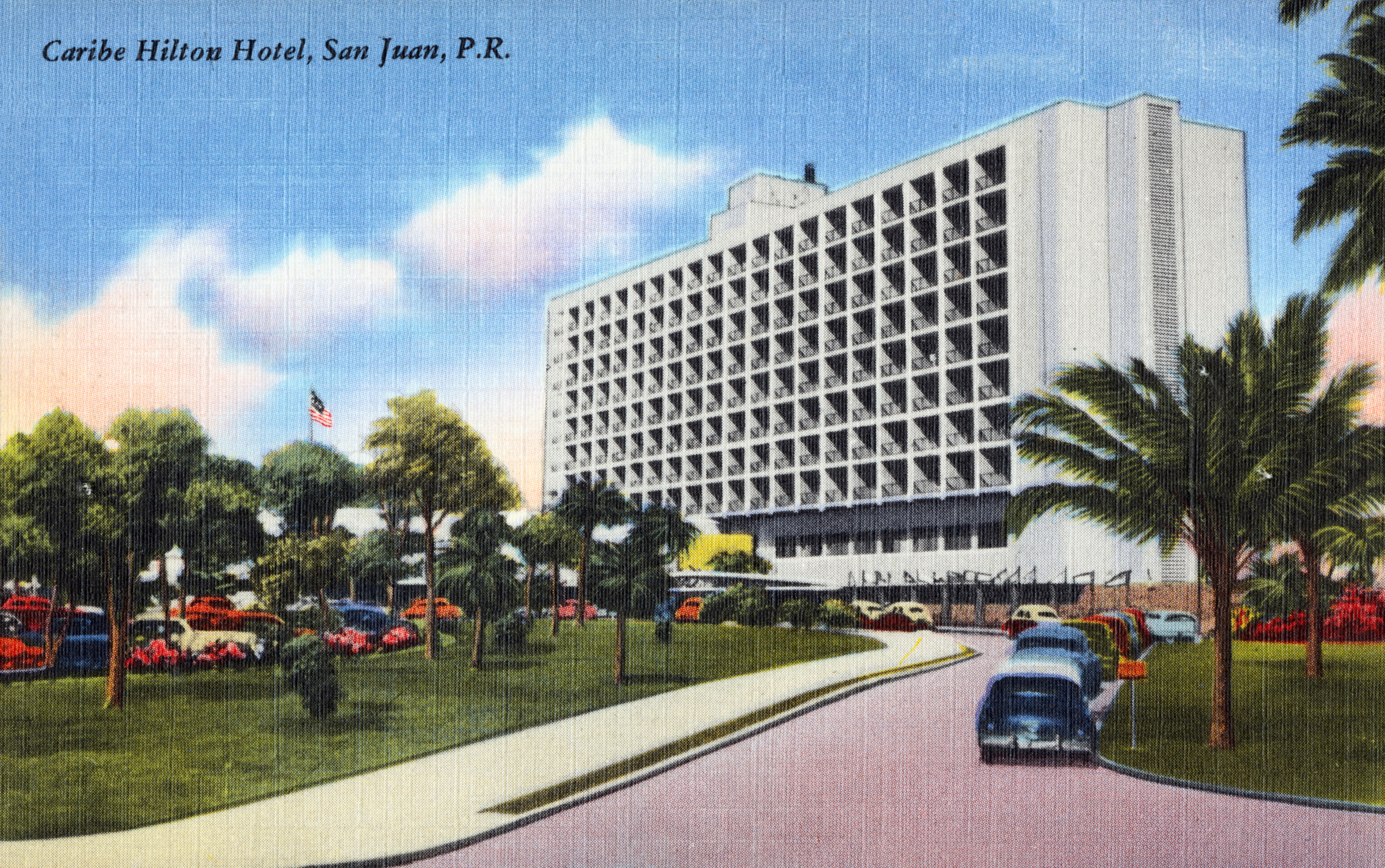
Caribe Hilton Hotel postcard from 1952.

Increasing land privatization in Puerto Rico takes place amid what scholars Yarimar Bonilla and Marisol LeBrón term “aftershocks of disaster,” where the island is mired in neocolonial debt and public infrastructures like airports and hospitals continue to be sold to the highest bidder. The passing of Act 20/22 in 2012 also allowed wealthy elites from the United States to treat Puerto Rico as a tax haven and become “stakeholders.” New arrivals–who do not include those born in Puerto Rico—who spend at least six months in the territory can be exempt from federal, local, capital gains, and passive income taxes until 2035, all of which contributes to the rise of “hyper-segregated elite foreign enclaves around the island.”

As Naomi Klein and Boniila demonstrate in their research, this “infrastructure of disposition and displacement” was deeply rooted even before Hurricane Maria in 2017. Hurricane Maria only worsened the ongoing land privatization, as one resident shared: “It feels like Hurricane Maria placed a ‘For Sale’ sign on the island.” More recently, in 2021, cryptocurrency companies like Pantera Capital and Redwood City Ventures have been moving their offices to Puerto Rico alongside 274 other corporations, LLCs, partnerships, and other entities approved under the Exports Services Act to avoid taxes. Mortgage investors, such as Goldman Sachs Group Inc., Perella Weinberg Partners, and TPG Capital have increasingly turned to Puerto Rico for cheap foreclosed properties as local residents are forced to leave. There is such significant demand that other companies, such as PRelocate, specialize in helping their clients relocate their businesses to the island.

==== Land Ownership Shifts and Tourism ====
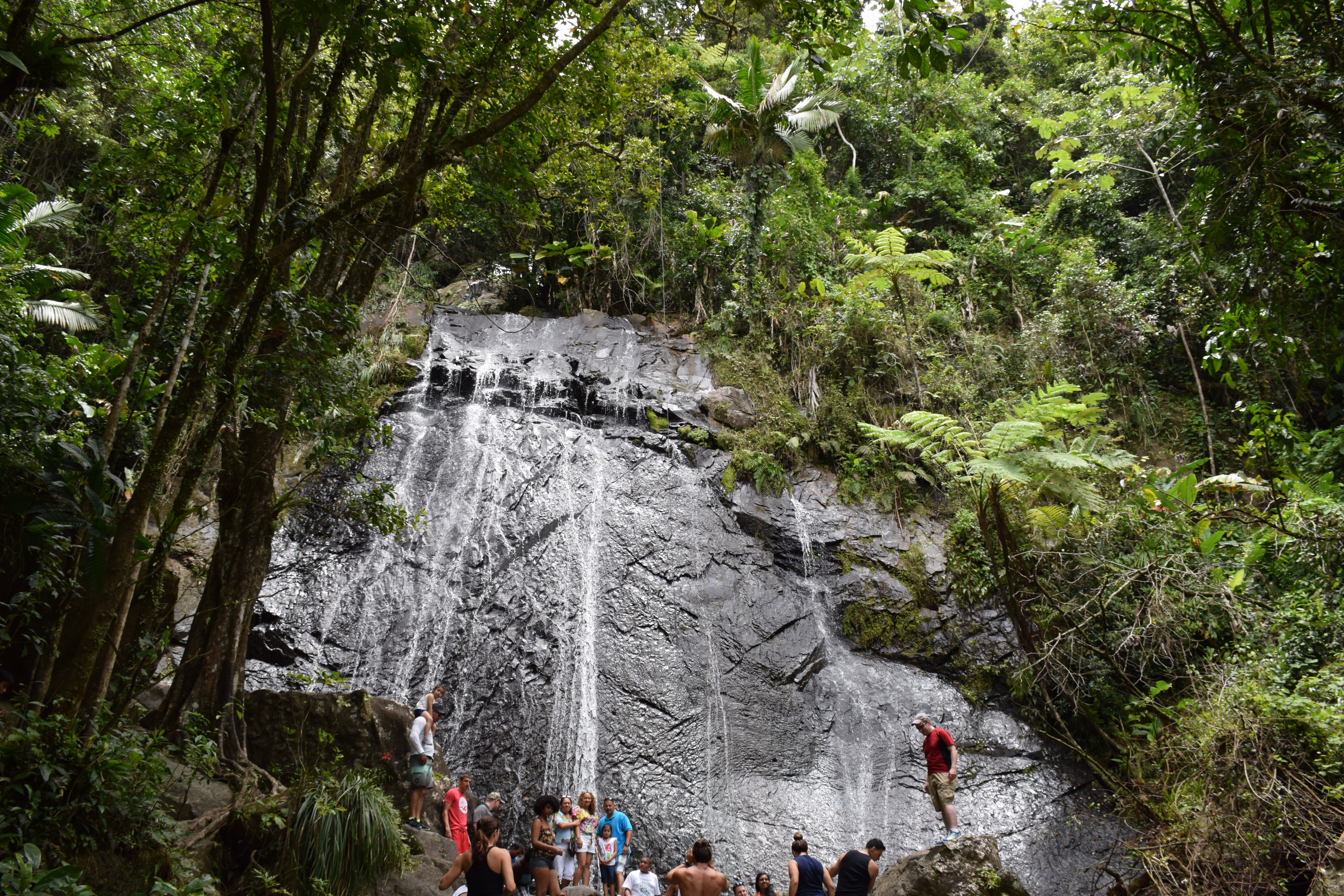
Tourists at Juan Diego Falls in El Yunque National Forest.

The lack of proof of ownership of land and homes in Puerto Rico has served as an obstacle for people whose homes were destroyed by Hurricane Maria in 2017 to get repaired. According to the Puerto Rico Builders’ Association, in 2018, 45-55% of homes and commercial buildings have been constructed without building permits or following land use codes. It is estimated that 260,000 homes do not have deeds or titles. Much of these illegally built homes have been cited as examples of “rescuing land.” Many who lack the resources would thereby “rescue land” by building homes in vacant and unused land that is often owned by the state, and not homeowners. In addition, many homes lack historical documentation because of the practice of subdividing generationally owned land. As a result, much of the housing that has been made inhospitable by the Hurricane that devastated the island, cannot be fixed for residents through FEMA funding, leaving many in dire and unsafe conditions, or without proper housing at all.

Meanwhile, in July 2019 the Puerto Rican state planning board put forth new land use codes in an attempt to bring business to the island and alleviate the debt crisis. The plan, which was met with significant resistance, would potentially change areas that were zoned as natural resource areas, agricultural lands, and residential areas to allow new land uses. According to Puerto Rican farmer Carlos Pacheo, land used for agricultural areas allowing new uses, including industry, can negatively affect the growth of local agriculture in Puerto Rico and thus impact food security, which is a growing problem for Puerto Rico as the island has been relying on expensive importation of food. It is estimated that 99,000 cuerdas of land could lose protected status, making land once deemed as natural resources or residential areas, could fall into the ownership of corporations, especially tourist corporations.

Moreover, the Puerto Rican government has been incentivizing the growth of the tourism industry and investors from the United States, instead of addressing the lack of ownership of land and stable housing by regular citizens and long-time Puerto Rican residents. Act 74 specifically incentivizes investment in the tourism industry. Under the act, construction of new facilities or remodeling of old facilities for the use of tourism would grant land developers a 10-year tax exemption. Businesses providing tourist activity can be defined as timeshares, hotels, inns, guesthouses, entertainment facilities in ports that stimulate tourism, theme parks, golf courses associated with a hotel, and marinas for tourist purposes. It also includes businesses that administer or develop natural resources as a source of active and passive entertainment. In addition, Act 74 grants businesses excise, sales and use tax exemptions on imported articles to be used for tourism activity in Puerto Rico provided that there was a genuine effort to source the articles in Puerto Rico but there was no economic justification to do so. Moreover, businesses that provide tourist activity receive property tax exemption at the 90% rate, income tax exemption at the 90% rate if not located in Vieques or Culebra, income tax exemption at the 100% rate if located in Vieques or Culebra, and exemption from municipal construction tax, amongst other benefits for investors.

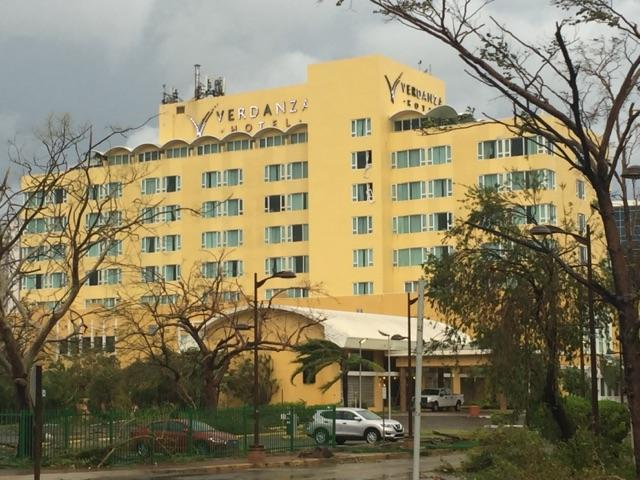
Hotel in San Juan after Hurricane Maria

Additionally, the 2012 Act 60 provides tax benefits for foreigners who relocate and buy property in Puerto Rico within 2 years of moving. 4,286 applications for these benefits have been approved since 2012. Puerto Rican residents do not qualify for these benefits, resulting in more and more land being owned by non-Puerto Ricans. According to The New York Times, many of these investors buy residential properties and turn them into short-term rentals, causing a housing shortage for local residents. In Rincon, a 2-bedroom apartment would list for $290,000 in 2017 on average but would now cost $420,000. This is as forty-three percent of Puerto Ricans live under the poverty level, meaning owning housing is increasingly accessible only to the wealthy, who, in many instances, are foreign investors.

British property investor, Keith St. Clair benefitted from tax-breaks that incentivize property ownership by tourist corporations. The tax-breaks aim to: “ignite a much-needed renaissance that will increase tourism” in the Isla Verde section of Carolina, Puerto Rico.

In 2019, Donald Trump’s tax incentive plan resulted in 98% of Puerto Rico being deemed as an opportunity zone, which would incentivize land development by foreign investors in areas deemed as low-income based on the Census. Pedro Cardona, former vice president and a planner for the Puerto Rican Planning Board says that the instatement of opportunity zones would introduce a gentrification and elitization component to various areas in Puerto Rico, which can be tied to foreign investment in the Tourism industry.

==== Grassroots Movements and Protests ====
There are numerous ongoing grassroots movements and protests against land privatization in Puerto Rico, particularly against the expansion of many resorts and hotels onto public beaches.

===== Los Almendros Beach =====
In 2021, protests broke out in Rincón, when the Board of Directors of the luxury condominiums Sol y Playa began plans to develop a pool that would spill over onto the neighboring public beach, Los Almendros Beach. Environmentalists and locals protested the development, as it would have caused a significant disruption to the wildlife and ecosystem around the beach. Locals also noted that Sol y Playa had no right to build onto a public beach, and were concerned that it was the start of an attempt to privatize the beach to renters in condominiums.

Controversy erupted when large numbers of police began to remove and arrest the protestors, despite the beach being fully public. The heavy police presence confirmed for many native Puerto Ricans the hypocrisies of policing in the island; many protestors noted how police often dedicate resources when wealthy neighborhoods (like Sol y Playa) become disrupted, yet in the rest of the island, police presence is sparse. In total, around 534 police stood ground at the protest site.

The protest, however, was extremely effective; the governor’s planning board declared Sol y Playa’s construction project illegal on August 4, 2021. This ruling was seen as a potential turning point in the fight against the privatization of public land in Puerto Rico.

===== Playas Pa’l Pueblo =====
Playas Pa’l Pueblo is one organization fighting against the hotel chain Marriott in Puerto Rico. They were founded on March 13, 2005, with the intention of setting up a basecamp in the near the Courtyard Marriott in Isla Verde, to protest the Marriott’s proposed expansion in the area.

Since the founding of Playas Pa’l Pueblo, the organization has been litigating on behalf of environmental justice groups to stop the proposed expansion. They regard the Marriott’s expansion in Isla Verde, as well as similar resort and hotel expansion across Puerto Rico, as an attempt to privatize public land and exclude native Puerto Ricans from their own land.

Playas Pa’l Pueblo has also been involved in numerous coastal restoration projects, as well as environmental education projects in their base-camp. They have begun to plant trees around their base-camp in order to re-establish a coastal habitat, as developers had nearly destroyed it. They have also hosted hundreds of students at their base camp to teach them about the ongoing resistance against the privatization of Puerto Rican land.

Playas Pa’l Pueblo’s efforts to rebuild the coastal habitat have led to locals calling the area Carolina Forest Coastal Reserve.

== Competition ==
Cuba and Puerto Rico have perennially competed for the top tourist destination in the Caribbean. The tourism industry in Puerto Rico has greatly benefited from the poor relations between the United States and Cuba. In 2015, the U.S. reestablished diplomatic relations with Cuba and loosened the travel restrictions for Americans. This decision boosted Cuban tourism and caused the island nation to surpass Puerto Rico in total visitors, but in 2017, the U.S. government re-enforced travel restrictions to Cuba. Puerto Rico also competes with the Dominican Republic, Aruba, Jamaica and Florida for domestic American and international visitors. Tourists also flying to destinations in the Lesser Antilles, such as Saint Barthélemy, Saint Martin, Trinidad & Tobago, and the Virgin Islands often have connecting flights in Puerto Rico.

== Marketing campaigns ==
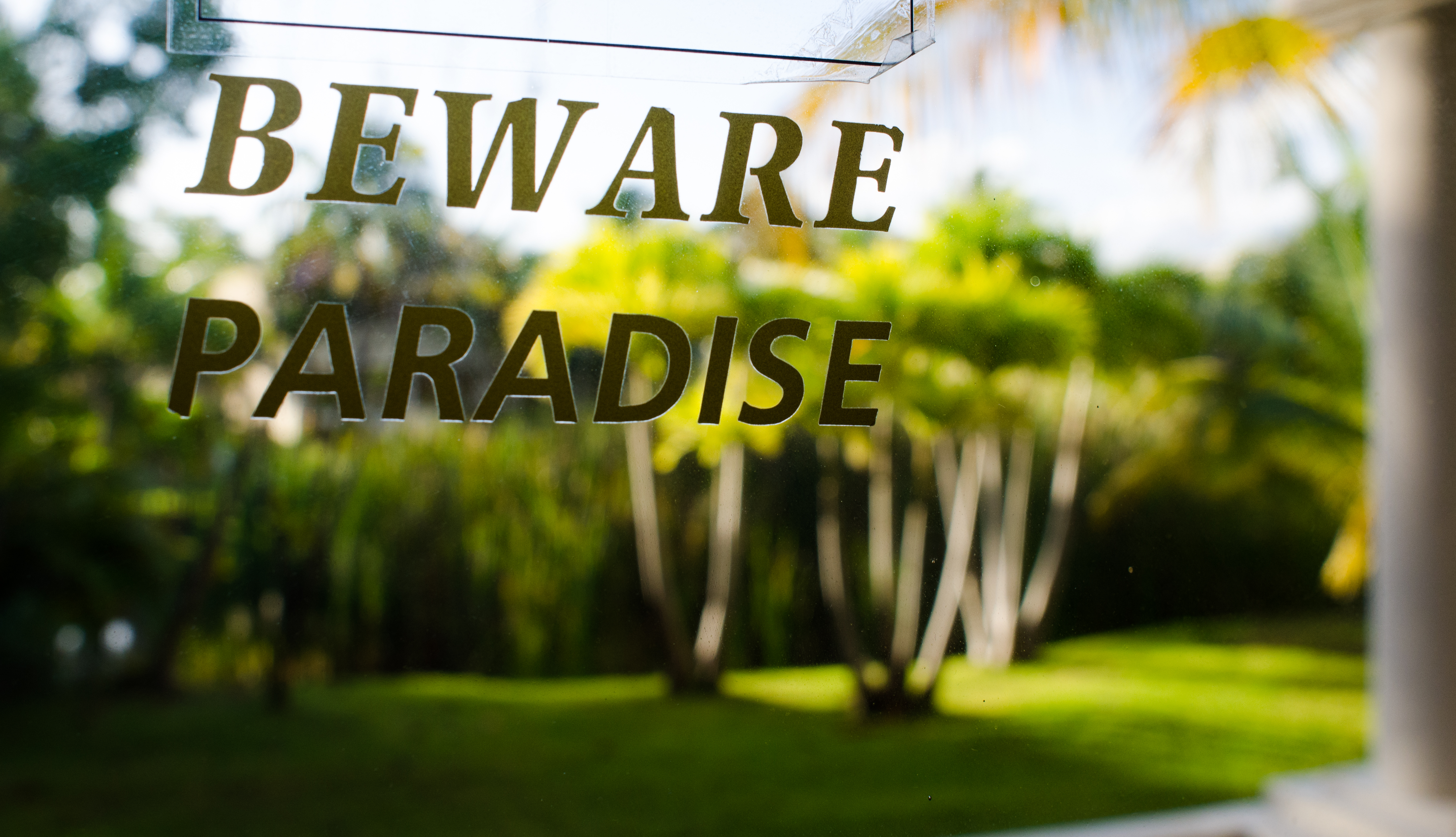
Beware Paradise sign, Río Grande

The Puerto Rico Tourism Company spent $1 million in 2002, featuring celebrities, to advertise the tourism to Puerto Rico. In 2017, Despacito, a wildly popular song by famous Puerto Rican artists Luis Fonsi and Daddy Yankee caused a spike in tourism to Puerto Rico, especially to an area of San Juan called La Perla, which featured in the song's video.

On July 1, 2018, Puerto Rico's government passed a law to create a new tourism organization, Discover Puerto Rico. This was part of a larger plan to use tourism to revitalize the island after Hurricane Maria.

The new Discover Puerto Rico campaign started that month. An April 2019 report stated that the tourism team, "after hitting the one-year anniversary of the storm in September 2018", the organization began to shift towards more optimistic messaging. The Have We Met Yet? campaign was intended to highlight the island's culture and history, making it distinct, different than other Caribbean destinations. In 2019, Discover Puerto Rico planned to continue that campaign, including "streaming options for branded content".

The video series Discover Puerto Rico with Lin-Manuel starring actor, songwriter and lyricist Lin-Manuel Miranda, became available on all JetBlue aircraft on 1 October 1, 2019 and would continue until 30 January 2020.

== Destinations ==
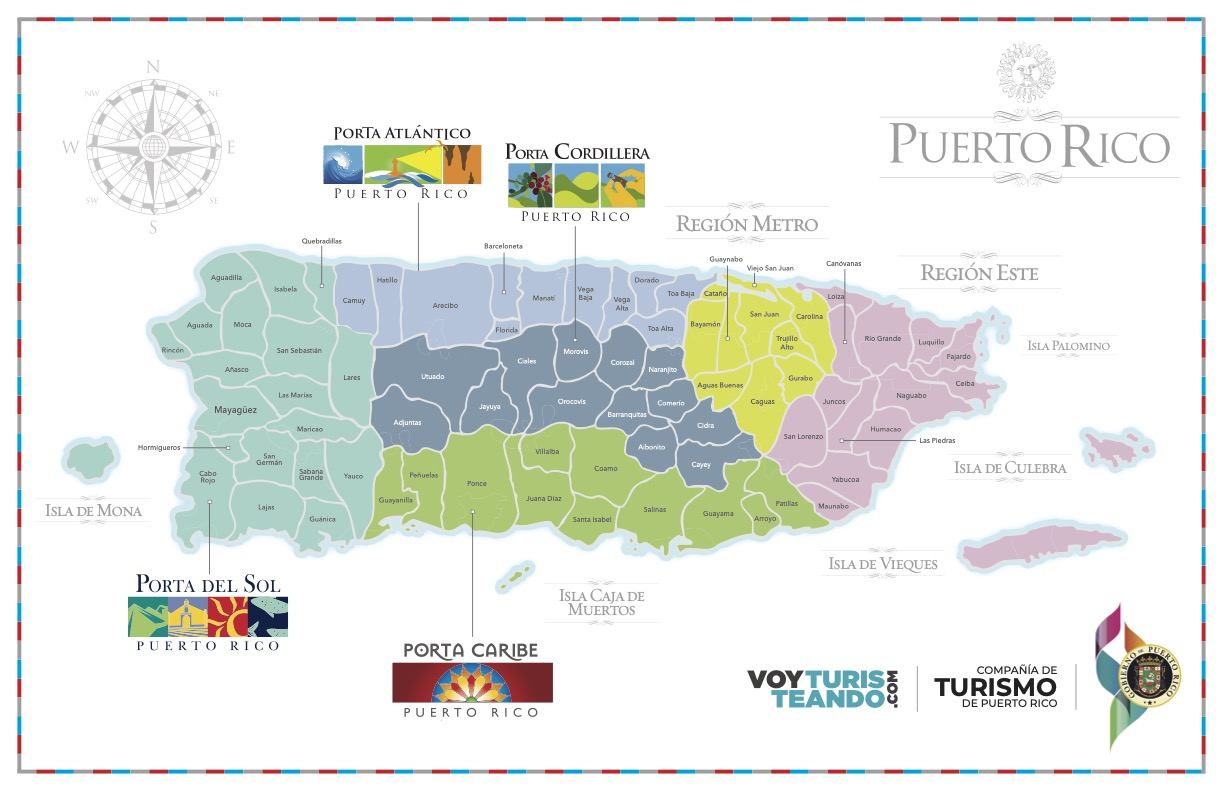
2021 Puerto Rico Tourism Company map of the 6 tourism regions in the island.

Tourist destinations vary around the island. The government of Puerto Rico and the Puerto Rico Tourism Company divided the island and its 78 municipalities into six tourism regions in order to better promote market and develop the entirety of the island outside of San Juan and to foment an inflow of domestic and international visitors into the different parts of the island.

=== Región Metro ===
Región Metro (Spanish for metropolitan region) roughly corresponds to the urban core of the San Juan metropolitan area, the largest metropolitan area in Puerto Rico and, with more than 2.2 million inhabitants according to the 2020 census, one of the most urbanized regions in the Caribbean. San Juan is the largest city in Puerto Rico, and it is home to some of the most visited tourist attractions in the island such as Old San Juan and the San Juan National Historic Site. The city of San Juan hosts numerous beaches such as El Condado and Ocean Park, museums such as the Museum of Art of Puerto Rico, world-class event venues such as El Choliseo, parks such as Luis Muñoz Rivera Park and the University of Puerto Rico Botanical Garden, and large malls such as Plaza Las Américas. Some of the other prominent tourist attractions of the region include the Bacardi Distillery, the Caparra Archaeological Site, the Caribbean Manatee Conservation Center, Isla de Cabras, Santurce es Ley, Julio Enrique Monagas Park, Parque de las Ciencias, and the William Miranda Marín Botanical and Cultural Garden.

=== Porta Antillas (Región Este) ===
Porta Antillas, also known as Porta del Este and Región Este (Spanish for eastern region), corresponds to the Sierra de Luquillo, the eastern coast of Puerto Rico and the island municipalities of Culebra and Vieques (often referred to as the Spanish Virgin Islands), and it includes El Yunque National Forest, the most visited natural attraction in the island. Some of the other prominent tourist attractions of the region include the Humacao Nature Reserve, La Cordillera Reef Nature Reserve, Las Cabezas de San Juan with its historic lighthouse, the Malecón of Naguabo, Palmas del Mar, Piñones and its food kiosks, Punta Tuna Lighthouse, and Puerto Del Rey Marina.

=== Porta Atlántico (Región Norte) ===
Porta Atlántico, also known as Región Norte (Spanish for northern region), corresponds to the northern Atlantic coast of Puerto Rico located immediately west of San Juan. It is prominently marked by its karst topography, which is evident in the numerous mogotes, sinkholes, cave systems and dramatic limestone ocean cliffs. The largest city in the region is Arecibo, one of the oldest towns in Puerto Rico, famous for its lighthouse, the Arecibo Observatory, Cueva Ventana and Cueva del Indio. Another prominent landmark of the region is the Camuy River Caverns, one of the largest of its type in the world. Some of the most prominent tourist attractions in the region include the Cambalache State Forest, Dos Bocas Lake, Hacienda La Esperanza, La Plata Lake, Mar Bella Beach, and Mar Chiquita Beach.

=== Porta Caribe (Región Sur) ===
Porta Caribe, also known as Región Sur (Spanish for southern region), corresponds to the southern coast of Puerto Rico, and it includes the numerous islands and keys located along the Caribbean coast of the island such as Caja de Muertos. Ponce is the second largest city in Puerto Rico outside of the San Juan metropolitan area, and it is one of the most architecturally important cities in the island with a unique style called Ponce Creole having been born there at the end of the 19th century. Some of the other prominent tourist attractions of the region include Castillo Serrallés, Central Aguirre Historic District, the Coamo Hot Springs, Cruceta del Vigía, Hacienda Buena Vista, the historic downtown of Coamo with its historic church, Parque de Bombas, Yaucromatic, La Guancha, the Ponce Museum of Art, and the Tibes Indigenous Ceremonial Center.

=== Porta Cordillera (Región Central) ===
Porta Cordillera, also known as Región Central (Spanish for central region), corresponds to the mountainous municipalities that are located along the Cordillera Central (also known as the Central Mountain Range). Some of the most prominent tourist attractions in the region include the Caguana Indigenous Ceremonial Center, Guavate and its lechoneras, Guilarte State Forest, Los Tres Picachos State Forest, the Luis Muñoz Rivera birthplace and family mausoleum, the San Cristóbal Canyon, and Toro Negro State Forest which contains Cerro de Punta, the highest point in Puerto Rico. Many of the small historic towns of the region such as Adjuntas, Ciales, Jayuya and Utuado are also closely tied to the coffee industry of Puerto Rico. In addition to the natural and cultural sites of the region, the Aibonito Festival of Flowers is a notable event that draws many visitors to the region every year.

=== Porta del Sol (Región Oeste) ===
Porta del Sol, also known as Región Oeste (Spanish for western region), corresponds to the entirety of the western coast of Puerto Rico which is located along the Mona Passage, and it includes the uninhabited islands of Mona, Monito and Desecheo. Some of the most prominent tourist attractions in the region include Boquerón, the Cabo Rojo National Wildlife Refuge, Crash Boat Beach, Domes Beach, Guajataca Lake, Guajataca State Forest, Guánica State Forest, Hacienda Juanita, Jobos Beach, Joyuda, La Parguera, La Pocita de las Golondrinas Beach, Los Cayos de Caña Gorda, Los Morrillos de Cabo Rojo and its lighthouse, Maricao State Forest, Palacete Los Moreau, Pozo de Jacinto, Punta Borinquen, Punta Higuero Lighthouse, and the San Germán Historic District.

== Cruise ship tourism ==
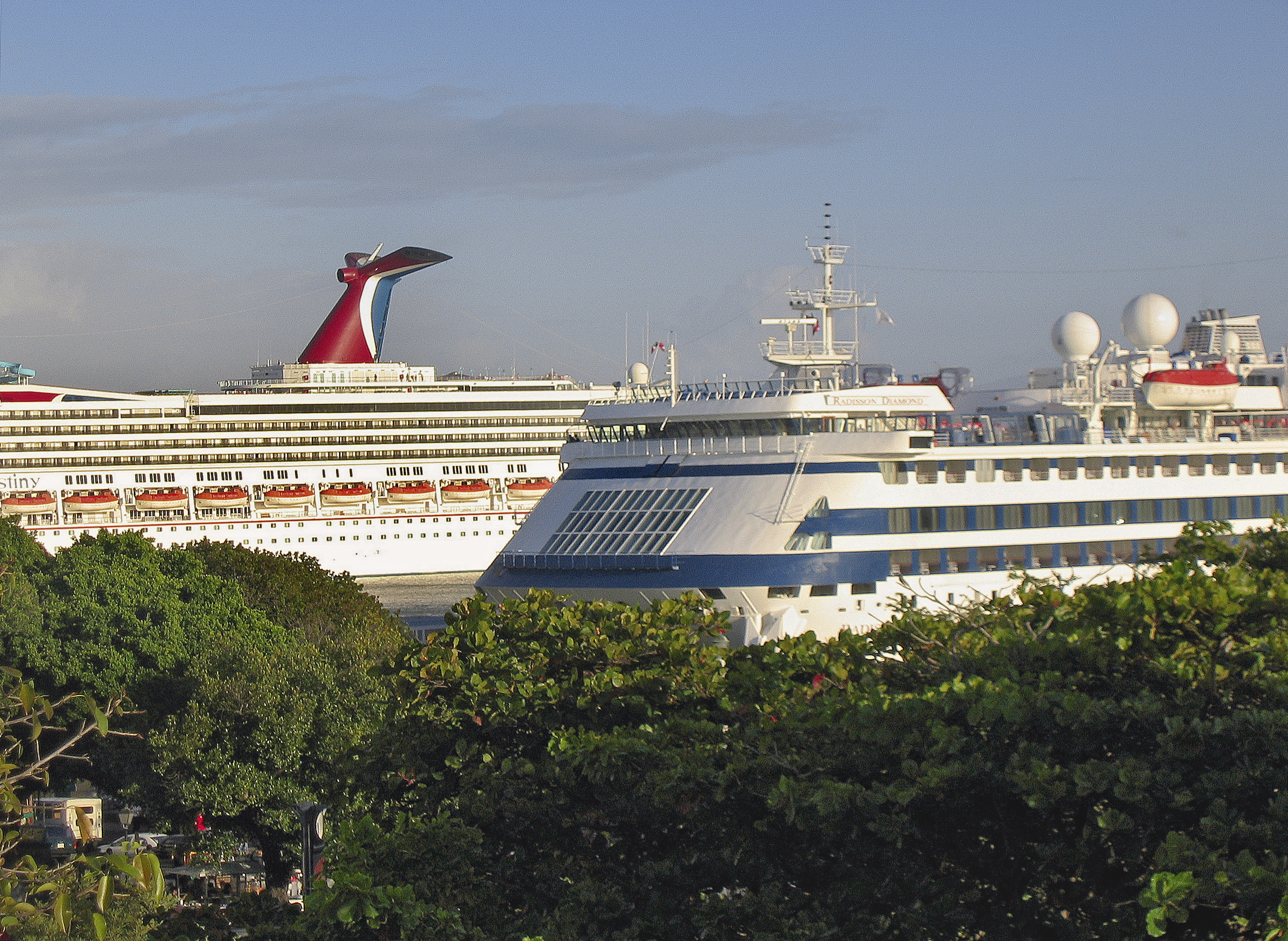
Carnival Destiny and Radisson Diamond at the Port of San Juan in 2004.

In spite of damage caused by previous hurricanes, particularly Maria in 2017, an April 2019 report stated that "1.7 million cruise ship passengers are expected to visit this fiscal year".

In late November 2019 however, reports indicated that 90 calls to San Juan by Royal Caribbean ships would be cancelled during 2020 and 2021. This step would mean 360,000 fewer visitors, with a loss to the island's economy of 44 million. As well, 30 ship departures from San Juan were being canceled. The rationale for this decision was discussed in a news report:

The reason for the cancellations is the privatization of the cruise docks in San Juan due to much-needed maintenance that is needed. Around $250 million investment is needed to make sure cruise ships can continue to dock there in the years to come. There is an urge for governor Wanda Vazquez to not go ahead with the privatization so this news is fluid.

== Airports ==
- Culebra Airport, Island of Culebra
- Eugenio María de Hostos Airport, Mayagüez
- Fernando Luis Ribas Dominicci Airport, San Juan
- Humacao Airport, Humacao
- Luis Muñoz Marín International Airport, San Juan
- Mercedita Airport, Ponce
- Rafael Hernández Airport, Aguadilla

The Antonio Rivera Rodríguez Airport on the island of Vieques serves visitors and locals to and from Vieques. It is a one-runway, primary commercial service airport.

== Gallery ==
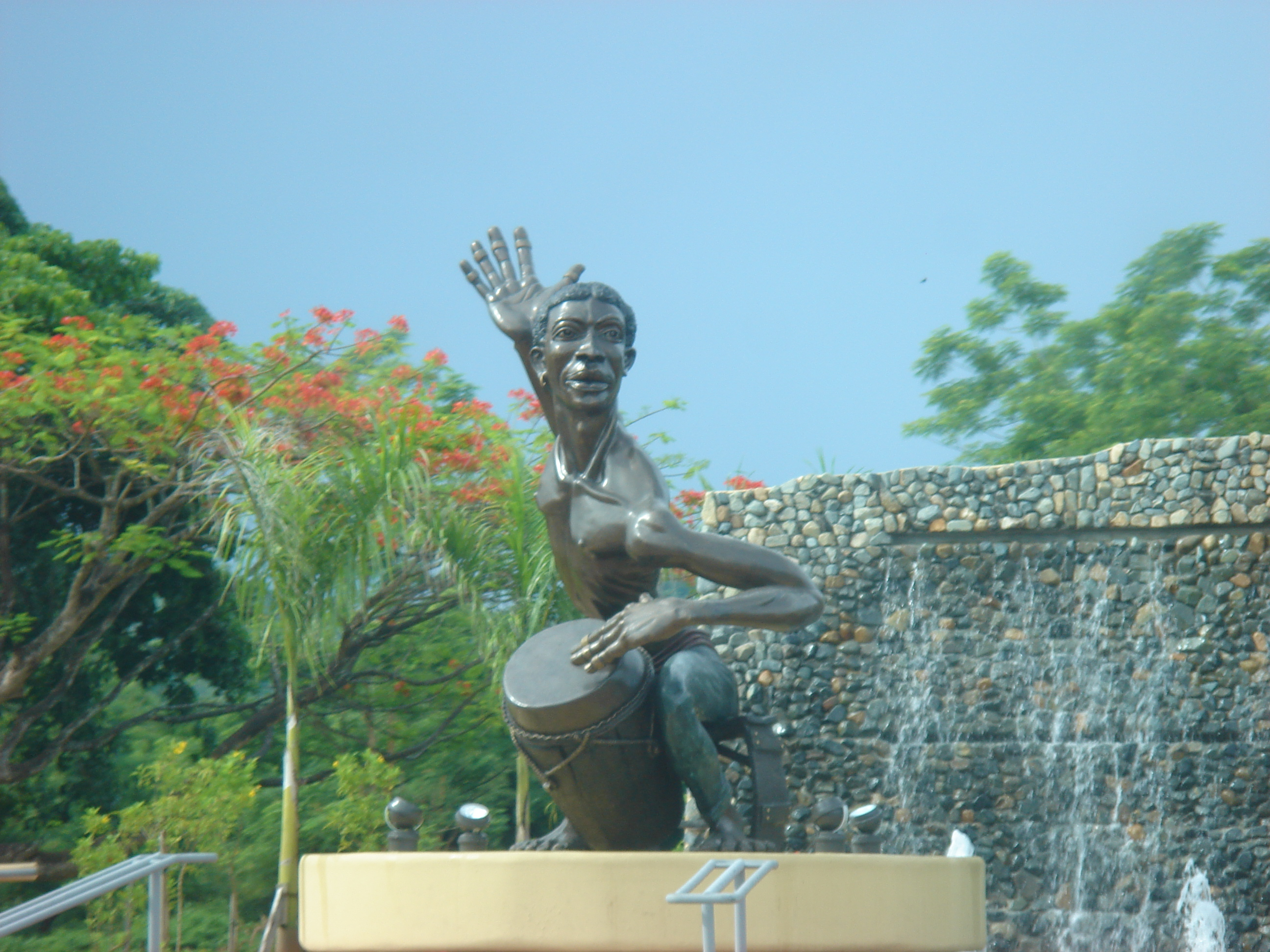
Statue of conguero in Caguas

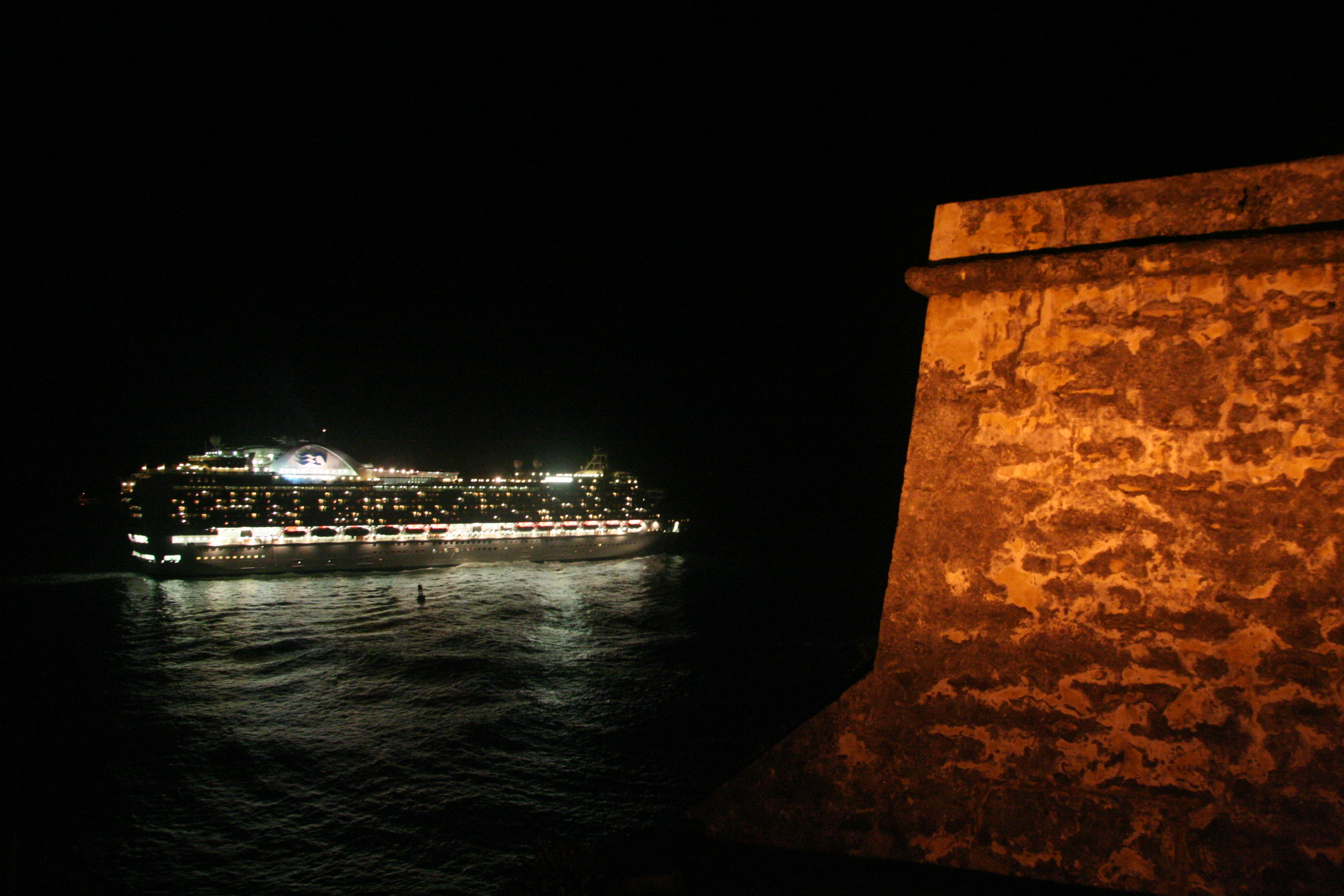
Cruise ship leaving San Juan

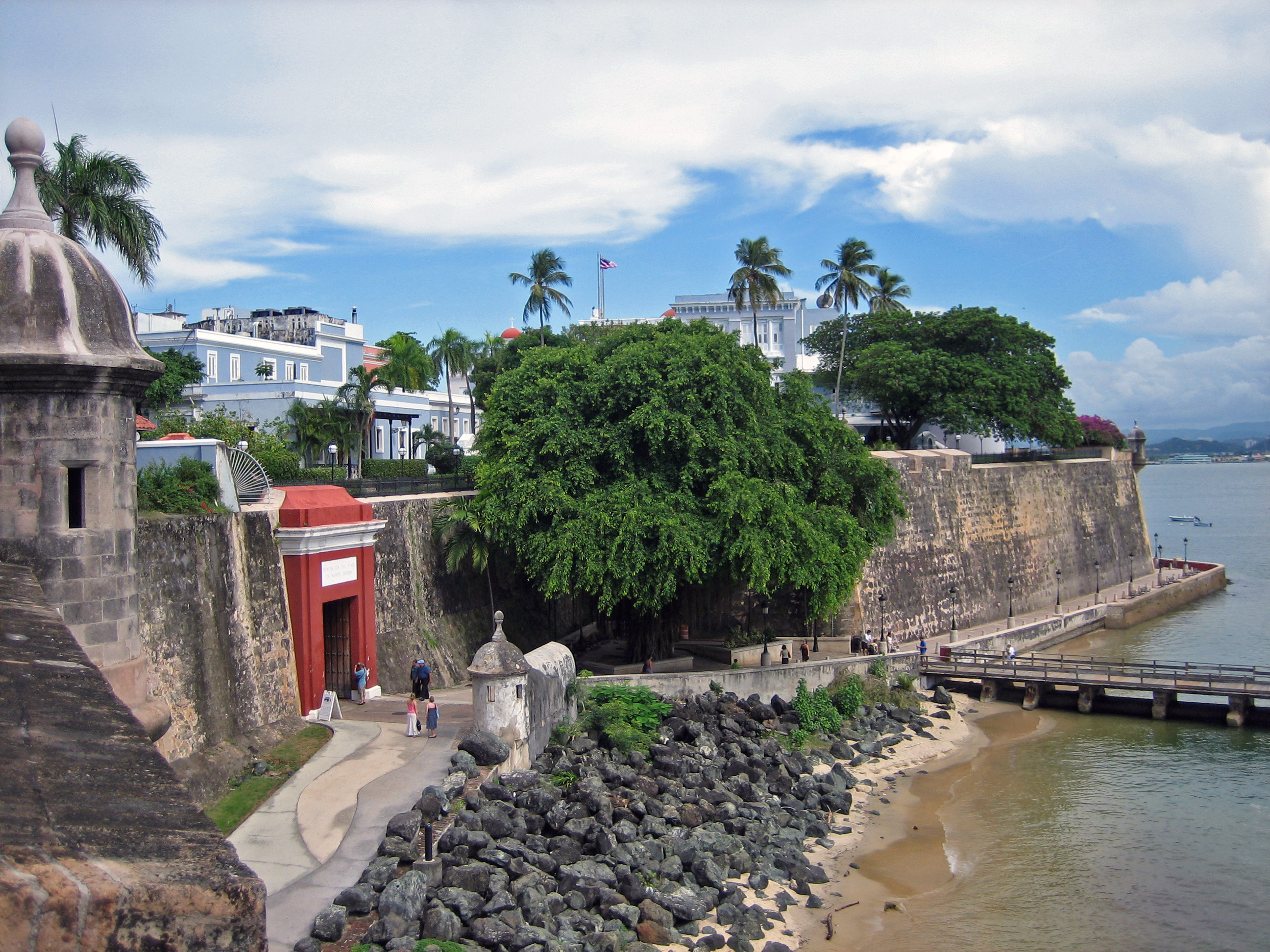
Historic Old San Juan

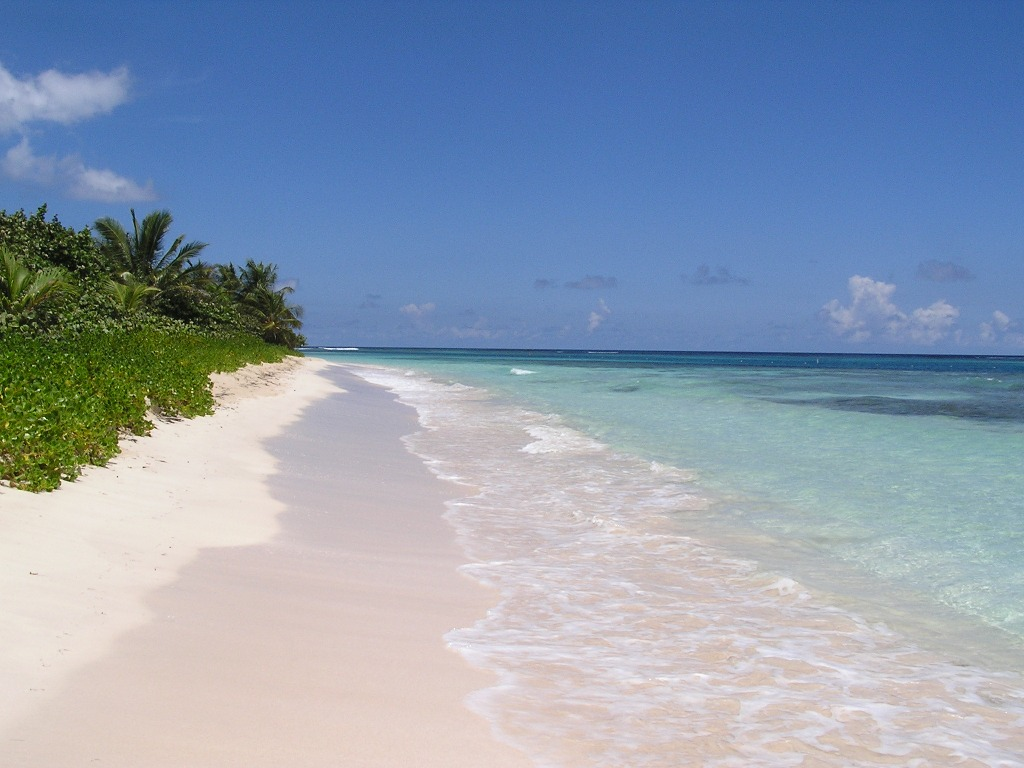
Flamenco Beach, Culebra Island

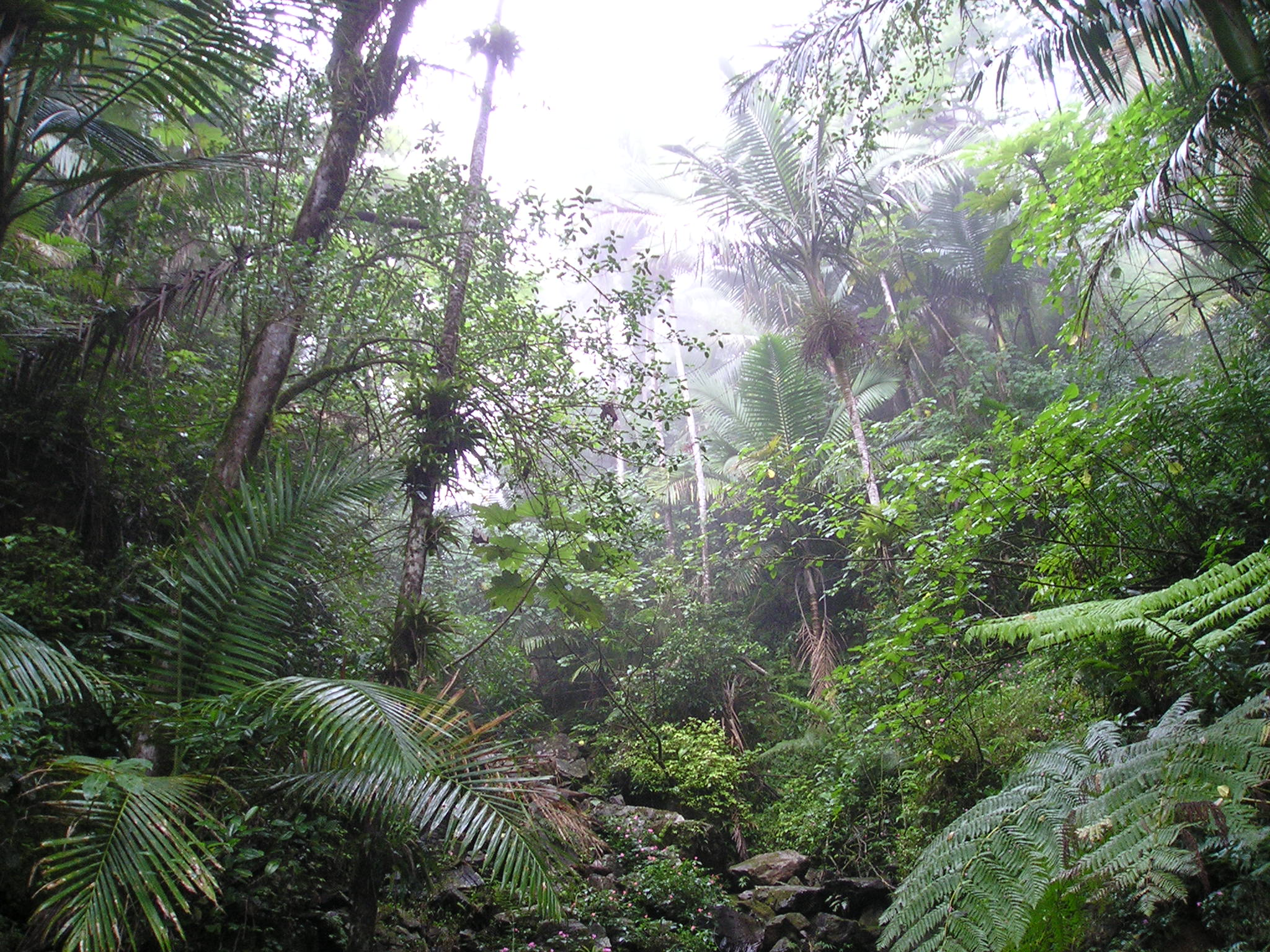
El Yunque National Forest

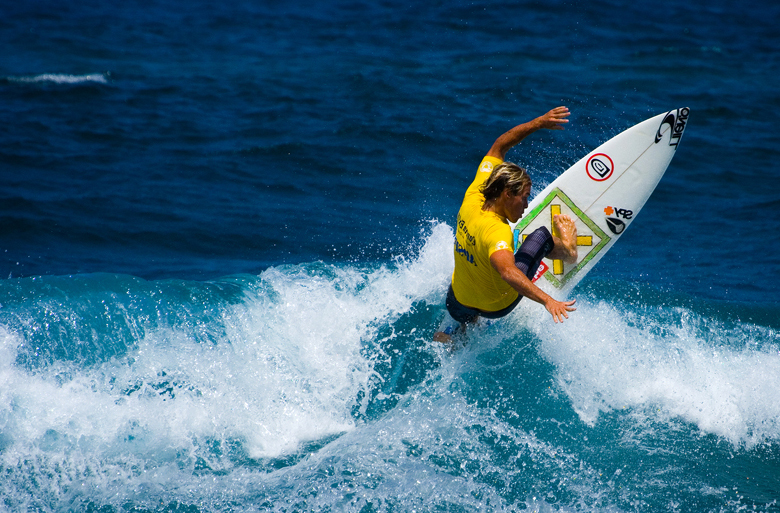
Surfing in Isabela

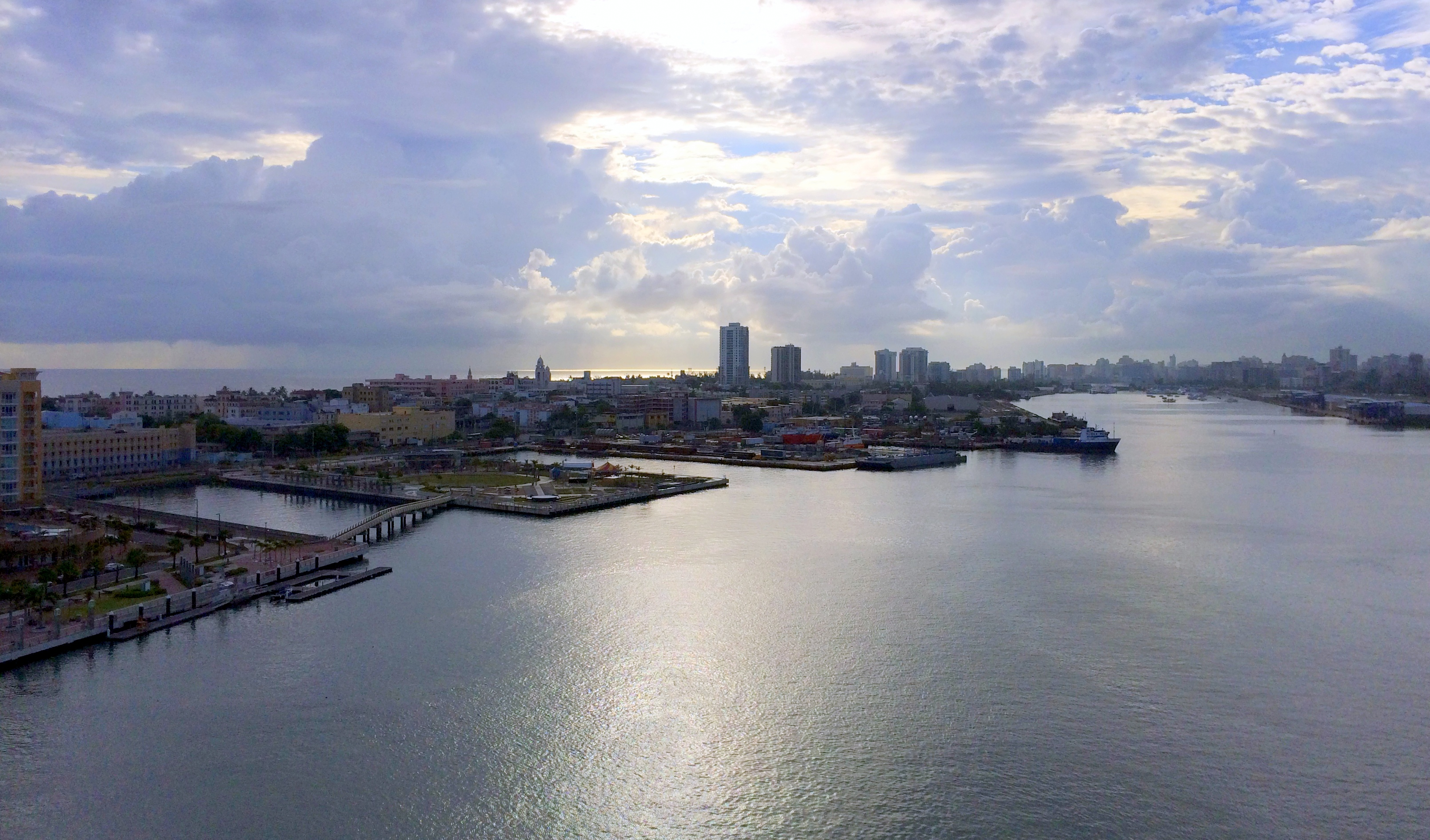
San Juan from a cruise ship

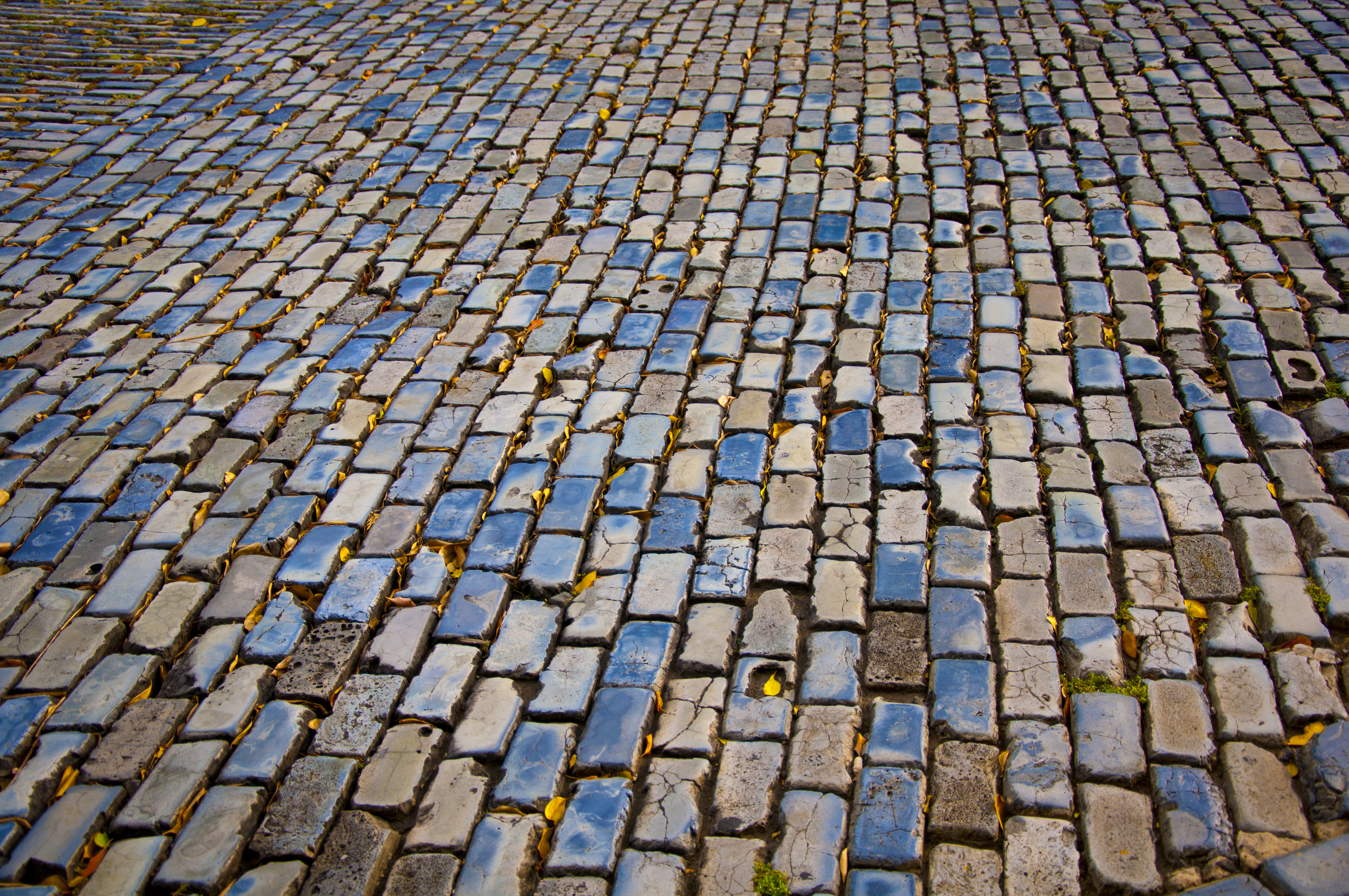
Cobblestone streets in Old San Juan

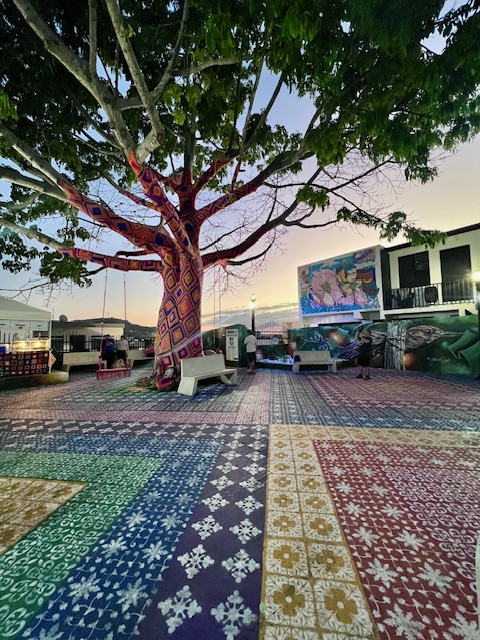
Yaucromatic art in Yauco

== See also ==
- List of Puerto Rico landmarks
- Public holidays in Puerto Rico
- Tourism in San Juan, Puerto Rico
- Tourism in the United States

== Bibliography ==
- John J. Cisco Jr. (1919). "Winter Motoring in Puerto Rico". Motor Travel. 11. New York: Automobile Club of America. OCLC 475945466.
