= Street art in Ponce, Puerto Rico =

History of street art in Ponce since the mid twentieth century and to the present day

Street art has existed in Ponce, Puerto Rico, since at least the mid 20th century. It received a boost from the Ponce municipal authorities in 2017, with the creation of the public-private partnership Ponce es Ley. Since then, over four dozen works of art dot the city and, increasingly, the municipality. Street artists have prominently created murals in the Ponce Historic Zone as well as its adjacent areas and barrios.

One of the objectives of the Ponce es Ley urban festival event was "to create a ‘street museum’, where people wouldn't have to enter a hall to view works of art," while also beautifying abandoned or unused buildings in Ponce’s historical streets. It has been said that there is street art in Ponce because ”street art is wed to the big cities, and that is Ponce[, a big city]". The city's street art has been termed "a street museum". It envisioned a city as a destination for art lovers.

Another notable street art project took place in January 2018 at Callejón Trujillo (Note: This alley is sometimes called Callejón Comercio) and termed "Murales para Pensar" (Murals to Make You Think). Unlike the Ponce es Ley murals, which portrayed Ponce history, and cultural, musical and architectural themes, Murales para Pensar portrays political, social and economic themes.

== History ==
Street art existed in Ponce even prior to 1960 when the now non-existent mural “La Abnegación” (Selflessness) was unveiled by Rafael Ríos Rey, Puerto Rico's first street muralist, at the location now (2020) occupied by the Instituto de Musica Juan Morel Campos. Rafael Ríos Rey's mosaic street art at La Abnegación was lost to the perils of over 50 years of Ponce weather and by 2016 a Puerto Rico PIP representative Denis Márquez Lebrón to present a bill in the Puerto Rico legislature to investigate its disrepair.

By early 2016 the Museo "Museo Abierto Playa Ponce" (Ponce Playa Open Museum) had also been created, exhibiting dozens or murals.

== Ponce es Ley ==
In 2017, an artist from Santurce named Alexis Bousquet Rodríguez, (aka, Clandestino 797) suggested a "festival of urban art", inspired by his own public art efforts in the San Juan neighborhood of Santurce (Santurce es Ley). His goal was to develop a network of street art that would cover all of Puerto Rico. The first town to embrace and implement the idea was the offshore island-municipality of Culebra. Once completed, Bousquet Rodríguez met with the Ponce municipal authorities, who agreed to host such a festival, under the name Ponce es Ley.

The project was co-chaired by the Museo de Arte de Ponce, while the Ponce municipal government established the range of themes to be included in the murals, deciding that displays had to be consistent with the history, culture, music and architecture of the city of Ponce. The kickoff event for the Ponce es Ley project took place on 8 April 2017. Twenty-two local, regional, and international artists participated.

Ponce es Ley street art was created at or near Plaza Las Delicias, Paseo Amor, Plaza Degetau, and the Instituto de Musica Juan Morel Campos, among other sites. Designs drew on Ponce culture (including vejigantes), residents, city life, family memories and folklore, agriculture, and the Ponce countryside.

=== Artists and their work ===
- Jean Ortiz Ortiz is original from the barrio Bélgica community. Ortiz worked on “Estefanía Rodríguez, the poet” at the location of the former “La Abnegación” by Rafael Rios Rey
- Juan Ramón Gutierrez Rovira (aka, The Stencil Network), from Puerto Rico, painted a mural inspired on propaganda (C. Luna, next to the Ponce Islamic Center)
- David Sepúlveda (aka Don Rmx) is a Puerto Rican artist who created the vejigante on the northwest corner of C. Sol and C. Mayor, and the first mural of the Ponce es Ley event to be completed.
- Sarah Emma Urbain Rodríguez, (Don Senario) also from Puerto Rico.
- Ess Urbain, creator of mural at Hotel Melia parking lot's east wall.
- José Luis Gutiérrez. Original from Puerto Rico.
- Nelson Figueroa Also from Puerto Rico.
- Bordalo II (Bordalo Segundo) creator of “Manati” at the abandoned gas station on the southwest corner of C. Villa and C. Mendez Vigo. He hails from Portugal.
- Decertor, who hails from Perú.
- Bik Ismo – author of the Ponce es Ley mural on the exterior of Museo de Arte de Ponce, by the Museum's Jardín Puerto Rico (Puerto Rico Garden).
- David Zayas
- Rafael Enrique Vega Feliciano
- Javier "Javi" Cintrón, creator of “Sangre y Resistencia en Ponce”, located on Paseo Amor, dedicated to the heroes of the "El Polvorin" fire.
- L.A.P. (Luis Alberto Pérez).
- Andrés Cortés creator of “Bandera del Puerto Rico Ponceño”. At 14 years old, he was the youngest of the muralists.
- Damaris Cruz.
- Miguel Conesa Osuna, created the mural at the Museo de la Historia de Ponce, Plaza Ernesto Ramos Antonini, seen from Calle Isabel heading west.
- Sheez Nicole, artist of the character “Uvita”.
- FISU, created a mural at Ponce Servicios
- José Vega, mural on Calle Cristina, on wall to former La Democracia, across from the Hotel Melia parking lot
- Josué Pellot, created the "Nothing is True" mural on Calle Torre and Calle Villa (northeast corner).
- Patrice Lladó.
- Betsy Casanas, created "Agua de rio", a scene based on a photograph from her father milking a cow. Original from Philadelphia, Pennsylvania.
- Jesús Ortiz Torres, creator of Hechos in Callejón Comercio (Trujillo).

== Murales para Pensar ==
Murals not related to the Ponce es Ley event started popping up at different locations of the city. The most extensive of these is perhaps on Callejón Trujillo, sometimes also called Callejón Comercio. The murals at Callejón Trujillo are known as "Murales para Pensar" (Murals to Make You Think). Here, José Balay, Edwin Caquías, Miguel Conesa, Antonio Martorell, Ludwig Medina, Paola Olivieri, Jean Ortiz, Duque, Liu A. Pang Feliciano, Emérita Feliciano Vélez, Jorge Romero, Jorge Antonio Romero, Wilfredo Santiago Rosado, Julio César Torres, Wichie Torres, Patrick Urbain, and 25 other muralists created their projects. The mural was spearheaded by street art muralist Jesus Ortiz Torres, who named his mural Hechos (Facts).

Murales para Pensar openly criticizes then-Governor Pedro Rosselló, the Junta de Control Fiscal, and then-U.S. President Donald Trump. For example, one of the murals at Murales Para Pensar depicts the December 2017 visit to Puerto Rica by Trump, during which he made light of the suffering of Puerto Ricans from Hurricane Maria in September 2017. The mural depicts the moment when the president threw packs of paper towel supplies at people in the group, which consisted of selected political sympathizers in Guaynabo, a town located at a few minutes' drive from the president's arriving airport. Murales Para Pensar also reflect the massive migration of Puerto Ricas in recent years, and the thousands killed by the passing of Hurricane Maria but which were not initially accounted for by the Puerto Rico nor the United States governments. Unlike Ponce es Ley, Murales para Pensar openly addresses political, social and economic issues.

The street artists that participated at Murales para Pensar included José Balay, Edwin Caquías, Miguel Conesa, Juan Luis Cornier Torres (Manwe Uno), Luis Ferdinand, Alí García, Tato González, Violeta Guzmán, Dany Lugo, Antonio Martorell, Ludwig Medina, Paola Olivieri, Jean Ortiz, Duque, Liu A. Pang Feliciano, Emérita Feliciano Vélez, Jorge Romero, Jorge Antonio Romero, Wilfredo Santiago Rosado, Julio César Torres, Wichie Torres, Patrick Urbain, Rafael Enrique Vega Feliciano, and Jesús Ortiz Torres. Several of these artists had participated in the Ponce es Ley festival the year before, while the majority had not.

== Other murals ==
There are also murals in a number of barrios not within the downtown area of the city, including Barrio Sexto (Cantera), Barrio Playa, and Barrio Tibes. There are numerous murals in Barrio Playa at Calle Salmón and Callejón Ramon Velez and a very extensive set of murals (over 20) with scenes typical of Barrio Playa on La Playa's Avenida Los Meros titled "Museo Abierto Playa Ponce" (Ponce Playa Open Museum).

== Gallery ==
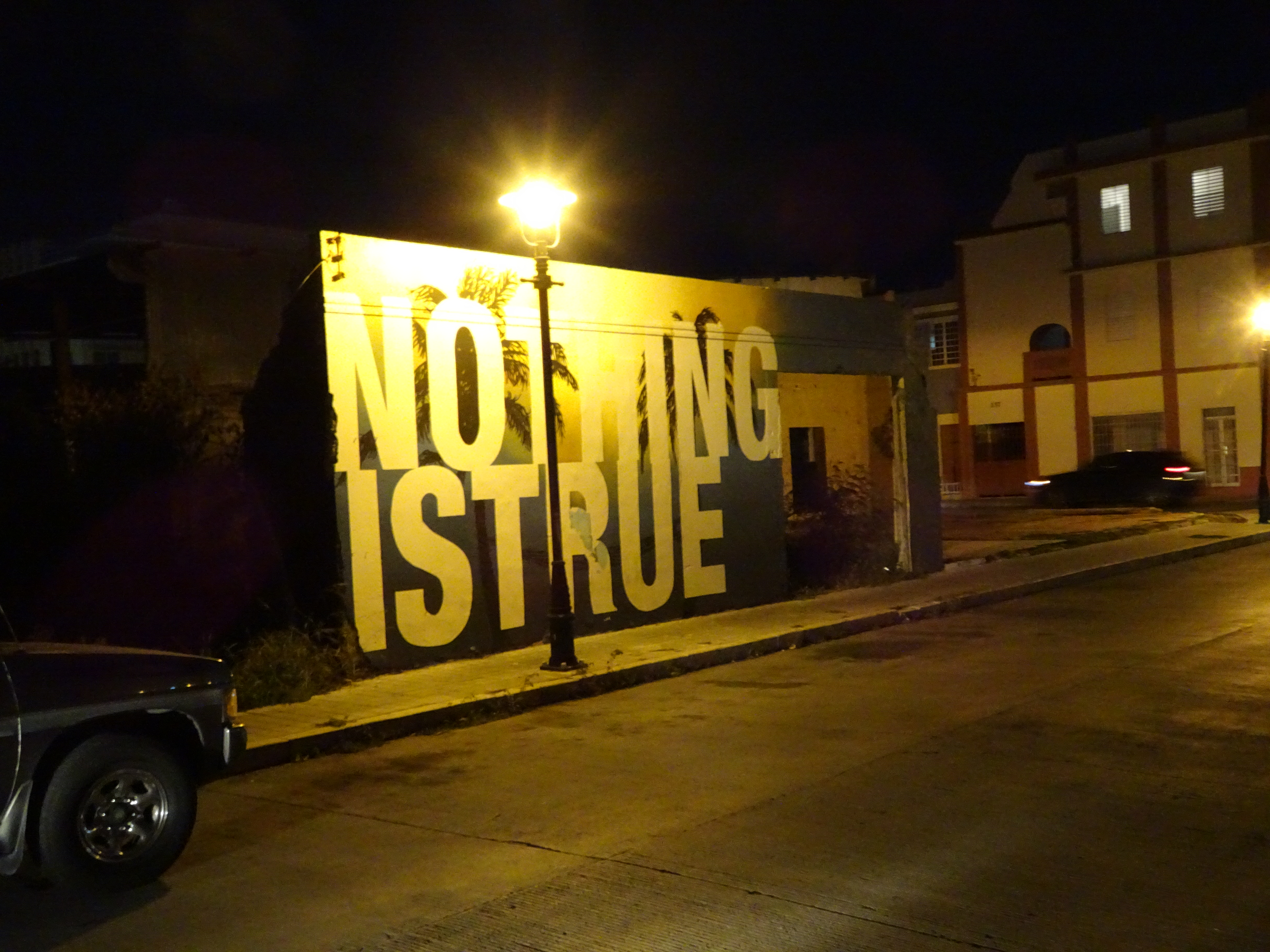
C. Torre & C. Villa, NE corner, Bo. Segundo

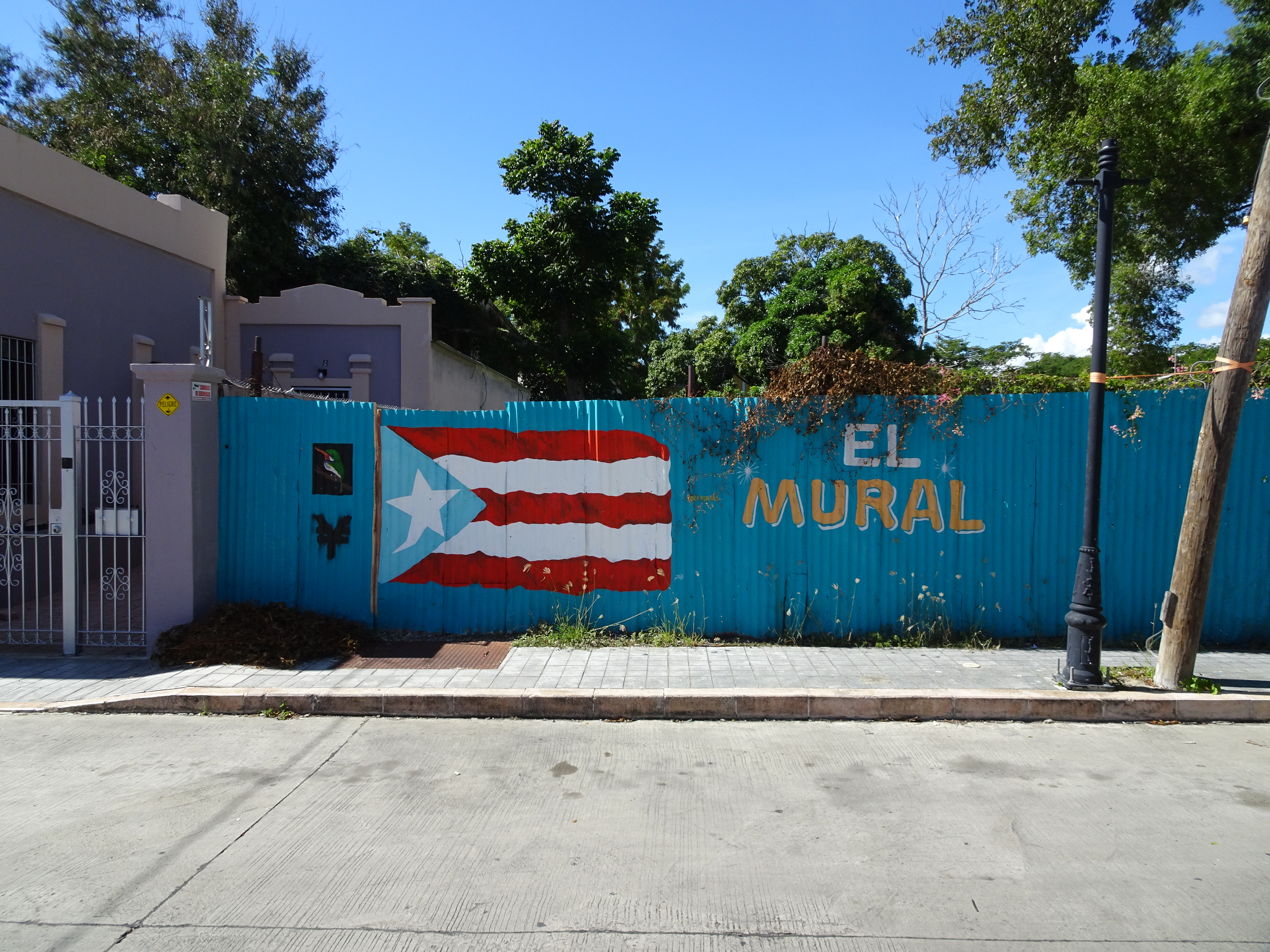
Calle Trujillo, Bo. Tercero

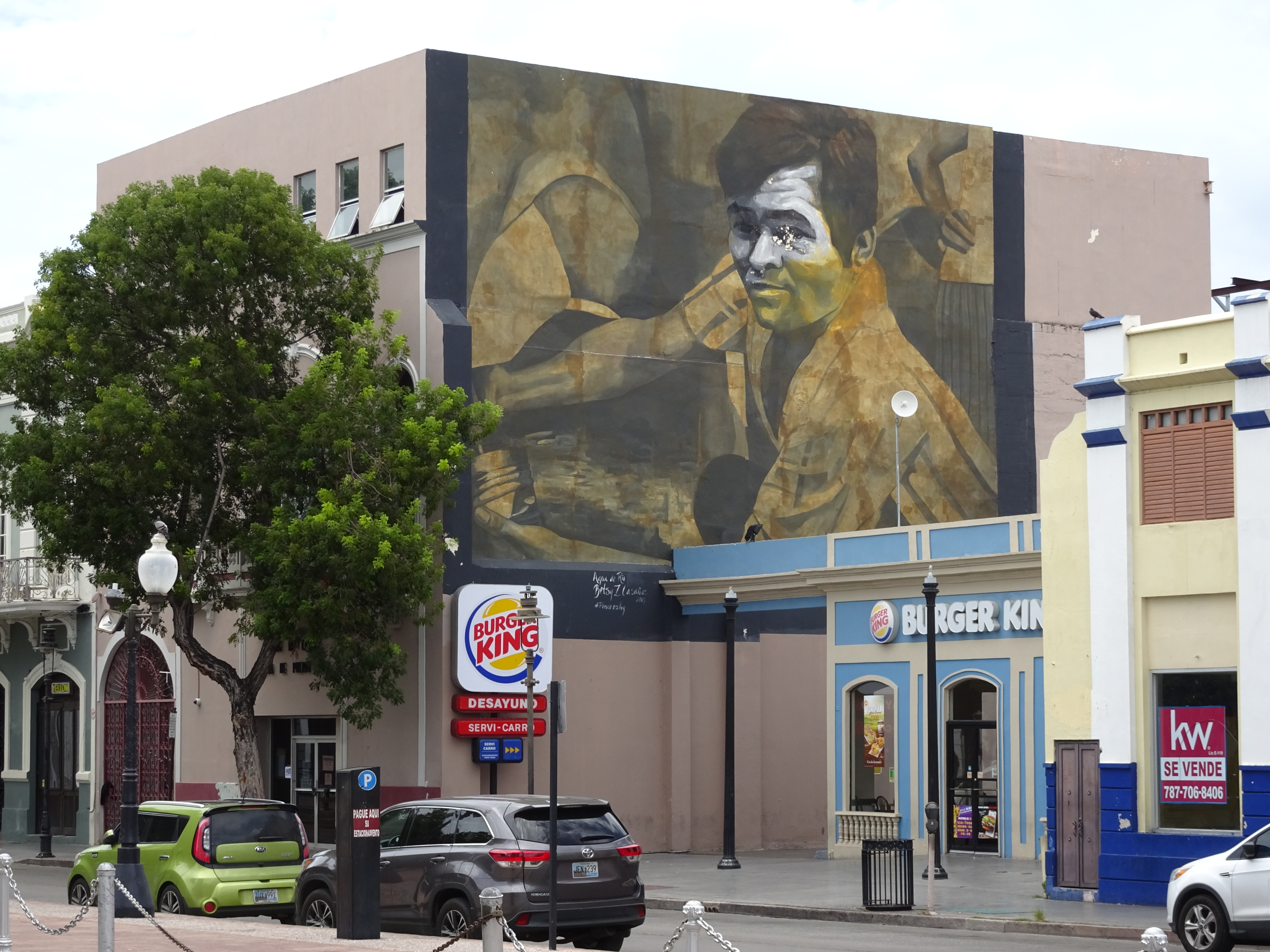
C. Union, Bo. Segundo

== See also ==
- List of tourist attractions in Ponce, Puerto Rico
- Urban art
- Public art
- Santurce es Ley
- Yaucromatic
