= Nayda Collazo-Llorens =

Puerto Rican visual artist

- Born: 1968 (age 57–58); San Juan, Puerto Rico
- Movement: Installation Art, Drawing, Painting, Printmaking, Intervention/Social Practice Art, Video Art
- Website: http://www.naydacollazollorens.com

Nayda Collazo-Llorens (born 1968 in San Juan, PR) is a visual artist whose work spans drawing, painting, printmaking, installation, video, and public art. Her work combines images, sound, and text to investigate how the mind processes information. While themes of displacement, alienation, and synchronicity permeate her videos and interventions, her text-based works explore post-alphabetic communication, hyperconnectivity and “noise” as systems of information. Collazo-Llorens is the granddaughter of the Puerto Rican literary critic, linguist, and lexicographer, Washington Llorens. Though born and raised in Puerto Rico, she attended college and graduate school in the United States, receiving her BFA in printmaking and graphic design from the Massachusetts College of Art in 1990 and her MFA from New York University in 2002. She has taught at Indiana University of Pennsylvania, Carnegie Mellon University School of Art, Kalamazoo College, and, from fall 2014 to spring 2017, held the position of Stuart and Barbara Padnos Distinguished Artist in Residence at Grand Valley State University.

== Early work, influences, and context ==
Collazo-Llorens is a member of a generation of artists who critic Manuel Alvarez Lezama has dubbed “Los Novísimos” – “The Newest Ones” – which he defines as Puerto Rican artists coming of artistic age in the 1990s responsible for an infusion of provocative contemporary art into the Puerto Rican art scene. The artists of “Los Novísimos” – including Allora & Calzadilla, Fernando Colón Gonzalez, Yvelisse Jiménez, Arnaldo Morales, and Miguel Trelles – often use mapping terminology, such as the metaphor of the “axis,” discussed by key Latin American cultural critics such as Monica Amor, Guillermo Gómez-Peña, and Gerardo Mosquera, among others. Curator Silvia Karman Cubiña sees the work of this generation of artists as neo-conceptual, “in which object and content are mutually dependent.” For her, “these artists navigate issues of identity, displacement and politics, but contrary to [Puerto Rican] artists of previous generations, they do so without nostalgia or resistance.” Holland Cotter, speaking of Collazo-Llorens's participation in the exhibition None of the Above: Contemporary Work by Puerto Rican Artists at Real Art Ways in Hartford, Connecticut, writes: "the diaspora phenomenon has become the basis for a new kind of identity politics. The art it produces is internationalist in style, embracing photography, video and installation, and tends to hold what might be called indigenous culture at a wry arm's length, in some cases bypassing it."

Collazo-Llorens adheres to the notion of non-linear narratives as in the writing of such authors as Julio Cortázar, Mark Z. Danielewski, and Don Delillo, as well as to theories of perception – based on the dislocation of time and place through travel – espoused by Wolfgang Schivelbusch and Mitchell Schwarzer. Many of her pieces using the language of cartography are linked to digital communication and code-switching (the splicing of Spanish and English), featuring systematic and random intersections. “Collazo-Llorens builds a text of alienation – of being alien,” writes art critic and theorist Kathleen MacQueen, “as an existential process of identifying what it means to be human.”

== Works on paper and canvas ==
A printmaker, Collazo-Llorens produces, according to curator Deborah Cullen, "personal, visceral drawings on a daily basis over several years", describing the drawings as "compact expressionistic worlds comfortable simultaneously in the language of the bodily and the schematic.” Curator Laura Roulet sees Collazo-Llorens's paintings as revealing “a post-minimalist aesthetic, with the systematic organization of Hanne Darboven or Eva Hesse, and the calligraphic mark making and erasures of Cy Twombly or Brice Marden.” The methodology of these drawings broadens into mappings either on canvas or directly on the wall. Since 2012, her on-going Test series consist of map-like structures that function as systems of visual information while marks can be “read” as hyperlinked terrains or mindscapes.

== Video and installation ==
Many of Collazo-Llorens' drawings have a merging of mixed media and video into her installations. Cullen understands Collazo-Llorens's installation work as a “Gesamtkunstwerk, or total work, in which all the individual pieces of the project relate to and amplify one another.” In her Unfolding the Triangle – a series of three separate installations representing different geographical areas, created in 2009, 2011, and 2012 – “directional lines, numerical symbols and words activate the space and engage the visitor in the unfolding, a situational mapping in which the viewer collaborates in ‘reading’ the physical installation space.”

Unfolding the Triangle – Lake Michigan (2012) was included in a major solo exhibition of the artist’s work at the Richmond Center for Visual Arts, Kalamazoo, Michigan, entitled An Exercise in Numbness and Other Tales. Also included was an installation reflecting both the tradition of monumental history painting and media billboard display – Comfortably Numb (2012) – an archive of over 1,500 framed images collected from magazines and newspapers. Virginia Harbin calls this work as “a collection not of hierarchical information, but rather an experiential archive of the everyday.” Though the work references obsolete technology, it also intimates the barrage of images and words “that comes through our digital devices, constantly pushing information,” which is understood by the artist as being responsible for an increasingly fragmented and dissociated existence. In her video work, she expresses these ideas through non-linear means: for example, in Reverb, a 2012 site-specific video installation for Medios y Ambientes, Museo Universitario del Chopo in Mexico City, “the idea of the loop is taken further by the fact that there are multiple video loops of different lengths that are engaged by the installation’s video feedback. This effect repeats the video images exponentially and infinitely…these repetitions layer and decay with every loop, to the point of being un-viewable/unreadable.”

== Interventions and public art ==
Nayda Collazo-Llorens worked as studio assistant to the conceptual artist Antoni Muntadas from 2001 until 2006. His interest in the relationship between public and private space and the ways in which channels of information are used to censor or promulgate ideas influenced the direction Collazo-Llorens would take her own work; but while Muntadas addresses social and political communication, Collazo-Llorens “probes the [more personal] processes of seeing, remembering, and communicating.” Though much of the artist's work considers the indiscriminate assortment of thought, memory, and data within a technological society, not all of it is existentially nihilistic. Recent work includes a temporary textual intervention on the paths of the Miami Beach Botanical Gardens based on testimonies collected from Miami Beach locals and visitors. Commissioned by the Bass Museum of Art, Pleasure, Fear, and the Pursuit of Happiness (2013), marks the pathways with dozens of colorful, round, text decals. The narrative of these “sampled” words and phrases serves more as a trigger for new thought than as a reservoir of random recollections. Wave / Onda (2004 to 2010) is the artist's first permanent public art installation. Created in collaboration with Toro Ferrer Architects for the University of Puerto Rico's General Studies building, it uses color to evoke a series of waves crossing the building's façade, “formally organizing this once haphazard access to the university grounds.”

Revolú*tion is a site-specific text-based work on the façade of a chapel in San Juan, commissioned for the 3rd Poly/Graphic Triennial. It is solely composed of found text arbitrarily selected from Internet sites that cover the wall in what MacQueen refers to as “a turbulence of conflicting verbal conditions.” Cullen finds language to be “a critical element in her works, [that] shifts easily between Spanish and English, and incorporates counterpoints that range from diaristic, poetic snippets to snatches from advertising, signage, or the news.”

The context of her work, writes MacQueen, “is the human psyche, disparate and unknowable, yet manifest in the actions we undertake.” Whether through visual or textual signs, throughout her work, there is a consistent emphasis on the relation between perception and the technological environment and its impact on human relations. “I’m neither critiquing technology nor supporting it,” says the artist, “rather, exploring the contemporary reality it has produced.”

== Recognition ==
In 2014, Collazo-Llorens was recognized with a fellowship from the Arcus Center for Social Justice Leadership to undertake practice-based research resulting in a temporary site-specific text-based wall installation for the newly completed ACSJL. It featured a collection of sampled text appearing to enter the building through the windows, as if voices from the community—often unheard, marginalized, unaddressed or ignored—were inflowing into this space dedicated to social justice. She also received a grant from the Pollock-Krasner Foundation whose program has provided since 1985 “assistance to individual visual artists of established ability." In 2010, she received a grant from the National Endowment for the Arts and the Oficina Apoyo a las Artes y al Quehacer Cultural, Instituto de Cultura Puertorriqueña, San Juan, Puerto Rico.

=== Permanent Public Art Installation ===
- 2010 Onda, permanent public project, in collaboration with Toro Ferrer Architects, General Studies Building, Universidad de Puerto Rico, San Juan, PR
- 2017 MACRO2NANO, permanent public project, in collaboration with Patricia Villalobos Echeverría, Heiser Natural Sciences Building, New College of Florida, Sarasota, FL

=== Public Collections ===
Artworks by Nayda Collazo-Llorens are held in the collections of El Museo del Barrio, New York, NY; Museo de Arte de Puerto Rico, San Juan, PR; Museo de Arte Contemporáneo de Puerto Rico, San Juan, PR; Botkyrka Konsthall–Labyrint Archive, Tumba, Sweden; Point of Contact, Syracuse University, Syracuse, NY; Western Michigan University, Permanent Art Collection, Kalamazoo, MI; and the University of Wisconsin, Milwaukee, WI, among others.

=== Other selected grants, residencies, and awards ===
- 2016 Artist in Residence, MAWA, Winnipeg, Canada
- 2016 Grant, El Serrucho, Beta-Local, San Juan, PR
- 2010 Artist in Residence, Taller Vivo: DocMAC, Museo de Arte Contemporáneo de Puerto Rico, San Juan, PR
- 2009 Greater Pittsburgh Artist Opportunity Grant, Greater Pittsburgh Arts Council, Pittsburgh, PA
- 2006 Grant, Urban Artist Initiative, New York, NY
- 2005 Artist in Residence, Location One, New York, NY
- 2000 Artist in Residence, Harvestworks Digital Media Arts Center, New York, NY
- 2002 Award, V Certamen Nacional, Museo de Arte Contemporáneo, San Juan, PR
- 2001 Award, Bienal Arte Joven, Museo de Arte de Ponce, Puerto Rico
- 2000 Grant, WorldStudio Foundation, New York, NY

== Exhibitions ==
Exhibited throughout the United States, Latin America, Europe, and Puerto Rico, her work has been reviewed in the New York Times, Art Net, Art US, Art Nexus, Art News, Arte al Dia International, and BOMB Daily, among others. She has participated in the 12th International Media Art Biennale, Wroclaw, Poland (2007), the X Bienal de la Habana, Havana, Cuba (2009), and the Trienal Poli/Gráfica de San Juan: El Panal/The Hive, San Juan, Puerto Rico (2012). In 2011, she was included in a major exhibition of Latin American art – Ya se leer: Imagen y texto en el arte latinoamericano – at the Centro de Arte Contemporáneo Wifredo Lam, Havana, Cuba. The artist created a textual intervention on the building's façade, entrance and sidewalk of El Museo del Barrio, New York, for their 2007 exhibition Visible/Invisible Journeys. A comprehensive solo exhibition - An Exercise in Numbness and Other Tales took place in the fall of 2012 at the Richmond Center for Visual Arts, Kalamazoo, Michigan.

== Publications by Collazo-Llorens ==
- "Bokeh." Alejandra, Point of Contact. No 1-2 ed. Vol. 10. Syracuse: Syracuse UP, 2010. 51-57. Site-specific visual intervention in a publication.
- ESC. Pittsburgh: NCL, 2009. Artist book part of Collazo-Llorens’ 10th Havana Biennial project. Four-color printing; edition of 1,000
- "Interference." Chicana/Latina Studies: the Journal of Mujeres Activas en Letras y Cambio Social 7.1 (2007): 6+. Commissioned site-specific textual intervention in a publication.
