= Patricia Villalobos Echeverría =

American-born Nicaraguan visual artist and educator

- Born: 1965 (age 60–61); Memphis, Tennessee
- Website: patriciavillalobos.com

Patricia Villalobos Echeverría (1965) is an American-born Nicaraguan visual artist and educator of Salvadoran descent whose work spans printmaking, installation, video, sculpture, photography, and socially-engaged art. Her art is held in the permanent collections of a number of public institutions.

== Biography ==
She was born in Memphis, Tennessee to Salvadoran parents and was raised in Managua, Nicaragua. She moved to El Salvador before migrating to New Orleans as a teenager. She received a BFA degree from Louisiana State University and an MFA degree from West Virginia University. Villalobos Echeverría taught at Southern Oregon University, Cornell University, and Indiana University of Pennsylvania. In 2011, she became a professor of art in the Printmedia Area at Western Michigan University's Gwen Frostic School of Art, where she also held the position of director in 2010–2011.

== Work ==
In her early works, Villalobos Echeverría explored issues of transnational identity through printmaking and its conceptual strategies such as doubling, repetition, and mimesis. In the late 1990s and early 2000s, she combined printmaking techniques and printed on unconventional supports as part of installation works that also incorporated sound and video. One example of this is the 1997 multimedia installation Reciprocity~Reciprocidad, which included serigraphs on canvas, wood, medical tubing and sound equipment, and is part of the Terremoto-Earthquake series. Dr. Kency Cornejo, a scholar of contemporary and modern Latin American art history with emphasis on Central America and its diaspora writes the following about Villalobos Echeverría's work: "The destruction brought on by colliding plates becomes a metaphor for the catastrophic collision of worlds, cultures, and political interests in Central American history. Villalobos further connects this political collision to her own experiences of identity and displacement and of being in between cultures." In fact, all the works in the Terremoto-Earthquake series depict her body. In a review of De lo que soy/Of What I Am, a survey exhibition of contemporary self-portraiture by 22 women of Latin American or Caribbean descent, The New York Times art critic Holland Cotter writes: "In Patricia Villalobos Echeverria's photographic 'Terremotto-Earthquake Series,' the artist's face appears, but only as a half-obscured symbolic element." According to Cornejo, "Villalobos’s art contains a direct embodiment of memory that some artists use as a metaphor for both the corporal and geographic topography of Central America."

By 2004, Villalobos Echeverría was producing multichannel video installations using EPS foam as the substrate onto which video was projected. Art historian and critic Kristina Olson describes the 2005 installation Hoverings as involving "two videos projected from opposite corners of a gallery onto a suspended, white, two-lobed orb made of EPS foam." One video focused on a close-up of the artist's body drifting in an ocean surf, while the other placed the body in a field of snow. In conversation with Kristina Olson, Villalobos Echeverría states: "The hovering body was not only dislocated from geography but also involved in a kind of autopoiesis, suggesting the possibility or potential for self-creation." This is conceptually tied to the physical properties of EPS foam being a thermoplastic and moldable material capable of changing from solid to viscous liquid when heated above a certain temperature becoming solid again when cooled.

In 2009, Villalobos Echeverría produced the site-specific installation Parasite (40°27’25”N 80°00’48”W) at the Mattress Factory, described by Pittsburgh City Paper art critic Melissa Kuntz as consisting of "seamlessly crafted white foam 'parasites,' installed to look as though they have infested one room's walls." The cell-like forms intervened the architectural site and protruded from the walls as appendages, alluding to contaminants and disease as much as intrusion, camouflage and occupied territories. In reference to this ongoing series of site-specific installations, Cornejo states that Villalobos Echeverría "continues to explore the dual nature of the self" and that "she uses actual spaces of intervention, military language, and physical coordinates to connect her own subjectivities with current global visualities, evoking the specter of war." These ideas were further explored in cystema @ 23°8'27.054"N 82°21'10.117"W, a site-specific project produced for the XI Havana Biennial in 2012. In this case, the artist intervened the façade and interior of the Centro Contemporáneo Wilfredo Lam in Havana, Cuba with hundredths of EPS foam sculptures combined with a sound component. This work "takes on limitless resonances in the Cuban context," writes art critic and curator Clara Astiasarán, "for it emerges as/appears in a tacitly harmless form, but its effects provoke suspicious thought and/or action in the face of the unknown." She describes the work as a series of protuberances that arise out of the pink-painted wall, "taking capricious but essentially ovoid forms, whose 'aestheticity' and their flirtatiousness toward feminine and/or maternal signs, conceal the violence of their invasiveness." Astiasarán goes on to describe the sound as discreet, yet insistent and unsettling. In a published conversation about the significance of surface in the work of Jaime Davidovich, Analia Segal, and Patricia Villalobos Echeverría, its relation to abstraction, and how its complexity contradicts any presupposed notion of flatness, art critic and theorist Kathleen MacQueen writes that Villalobos Echeverría's "work is a complex maneuvering between realist narrative and abstract metaphor to reveal connections between identity, politics, and place." This is also true of her digital prints, such as the Marea series (2014–16) consisting of digitally manipulated photographs of bodies drifting at the ocean surf at El Espino Beach in El Salvador. Unlike her early works, here the body is not hers and it is not a single body, signaling a shift from the individual experience to a collective one.

The conceptual language of printmaking continues to be at the core of Villalobos Echeverría's practice, such as the doubling in the Marea series, the replication of sculptural forms in site-specific installations, and ideas of dissemination and exchange in socially-engaged projects. Since 2014, she has produced participatory works that employ storytelling and shared rides in an attempt to examine collective spaces through personal histories of displacement and migration. These projects include trans_porta sivar (San Salvador, 2014), tukituktuk (Beijing, 2016) and Transporta Managua (Managua, 2017). According to writer and curator Marivi Véliz, these projects dive "into the dynamics of community mobility to construct stories of travel that search for one’s own place in the human experience."

== Recognition ==
In 2018, Villalobos Echeverría was awarded a NALAC Fund for the Arts from the National Association of Latino Arts and Culture for her socially engaged project Retrace. Other awards include a Faculty Research and Creative Activities Award from Western Michigan University in 2012 and 2016, a Distinguished Faculty Award for Creative Arts from Indiana University of Pennsylvania in 2008, and a Creative Heights Residency Grant from the Heinz Endowments in 2005, among others. She has been awarded research fellowships at the MacDowell Colony, the Vermont Studio Center, and at Carnegie Mellon University's Studio for Creative Inquiry. Her work has been featured in the following books: Video en latinoamerica: una historia crítica, published by Brumaria (2008), Printmaking at the Edge, published by A & C Black (2006), Fotografía latinoamericana 1991-2002 published by Lunwerg (2003), and Del Arte Occidental al Arte Nicaragüense published by Fundacion Ortiz-Gurdián (2003). Villalobos Echeverría has participated in the 11 Bienal de la Habana, Habana, Cuba (2012), I Trienal Internacional del Caribe, Santo Domingo, Dominican Republic (2010), Splitgraphic IV: International Graphic Art Biennial, Split, Croatia (2009), Imprint 2008: Kulisiewicz International Graphic Arts Triennial, Warsaw, Poland (2008), IX Bienal de Cuenca, Cuenca, Ecuador (2007), XIII Bienal Internacional de Arte de Vila Nova de Cerveira, Cerveira, Portugal (2005), 12th International Print Biennial, Varna, Bulgaria (2003), and III Bienal Iberoamericana de Lima, Lima, Perú (2002), among others.

=== Permanent public art installation ===
- 2017 MACRO2NANO, permanent public art project, in collaboration with Nayda Collazo-Llorens, Heiser Natural Sciences Building, New College of Florida, Sarasota, Florida

=== Public collections ===
- Anchor Graphics, Columbia College, Chicago, IL
- Artist Image Resource, Pittsburgh, PA
- Bibliotheca Alexandrina, Alexandria, Egypt
- Egress Press, Edinboro University of Pennsylvania, Edinboro, PA
- Erie Art Museum, Erie, PA
- Fundación Gurdián-Ortiz, León, Nicaragua
- Museo de Arte y Diseño Contemporáneo, San José, Costa Rica
- Northwest Museum of Arts and Culture, Spokane, WA
- Southern Graphics Council International, Permanent Collection
- Teatro Nacional Rubén Darío, Managua, Nicaragua
- The University of Iowa, Permanent Print Collection, Iowa City, IA
- University of Wisconsin - Madison, Madison, WI
- University of Wisconsin - Milwaukee, Milwaukee, WI
- US Embassy of Nicaragua, Permanent Collection, Managua, Nicaragua
- Western Michigan University, University Art Collection, Kalamazoo, MI
- West Virginia University, Permanent Collection, Morgantown, WV
