= Yaucromatic =

Puerto Rican art movement

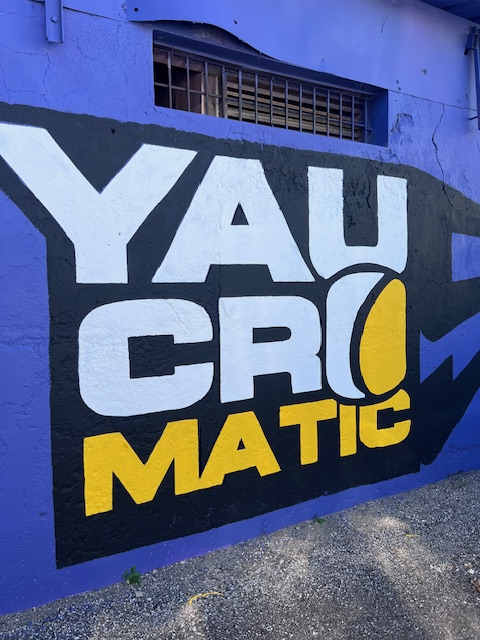
- Years active: 8
- Location: Yauco, Puerto Rico
- Major figures: Jonathan “Pito” Hernández León

The art movement known as Yaucromatic emerged in the town of Yauco, Puerto Rico in 2017 as an ambitious public-art intervention designed to transform the urban landscape through bold color, community involvement and mural‐scale works. Spearheaded by the nonprofit Arte Para Unir Inc. under the leadership of Jonathan Hernández León, the initiative set out to reclaim neglected urban and hillside spaces—walls, stairs, façades, and entire neighborhood streets—and turn them into living open-air galleries.

Inspired by the idea that “art is not only for museums, it is for the people,” the movement enlisted local residents, artists, and volunteers to repaint their surroundings, turning once-forgotten places into vibrant, cheerful canvases that reflect the cultural identity of Yauco.

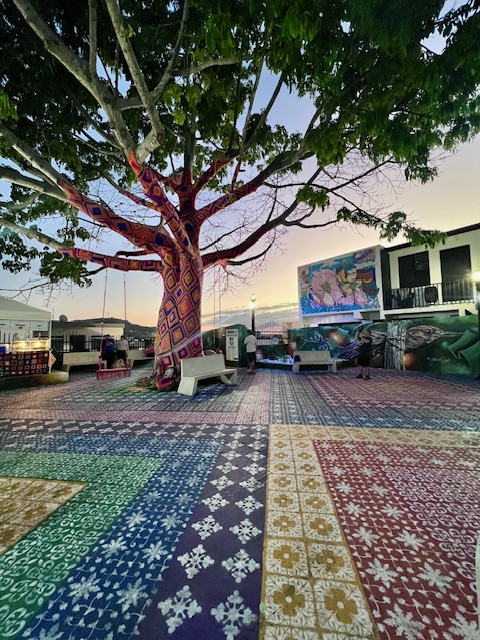
Knitted tree in Yauco

Over time, Yaucromatic has grown into one of Puerto Rico’s largest outdoor art-gallery experiences, with over 60 murals and art installations dispersed across Yauco’s urban and hillside quarters by 2022.

This expansion has had tangible social and economic impacts: by attracting tourists, instilling community pride, and repurposing derelict or under-utilized spaces, the movement has become a model of urban creative regeneration.

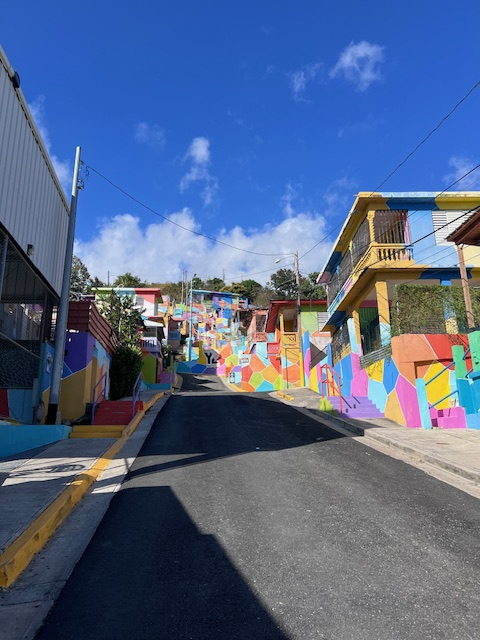

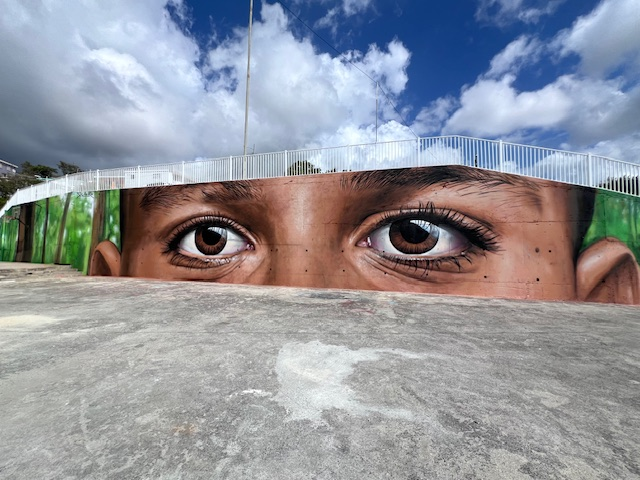

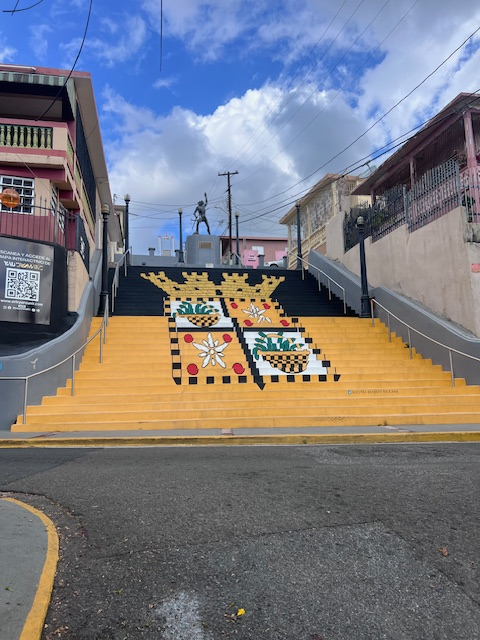

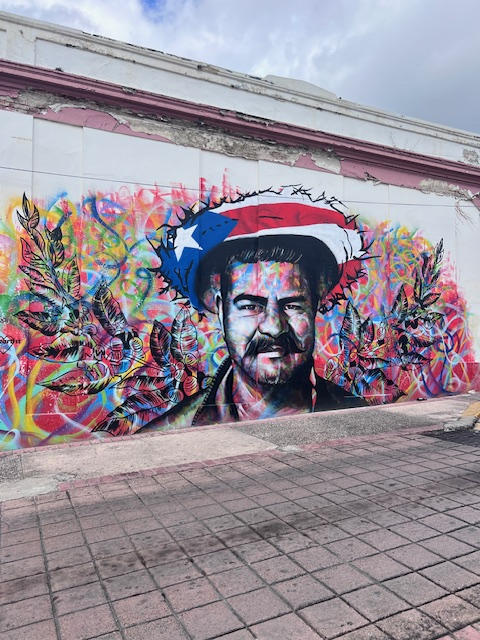

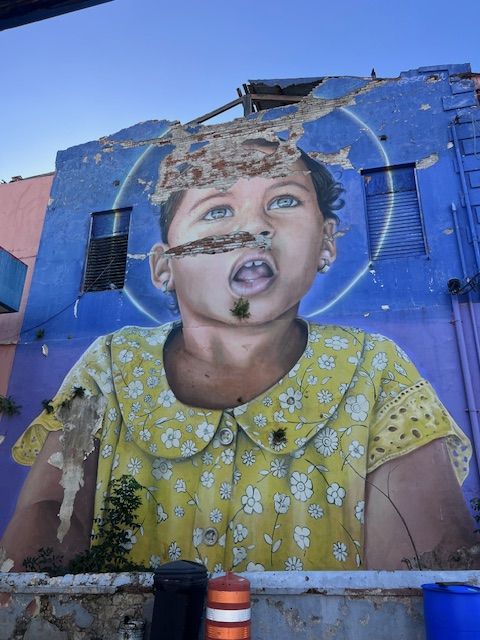

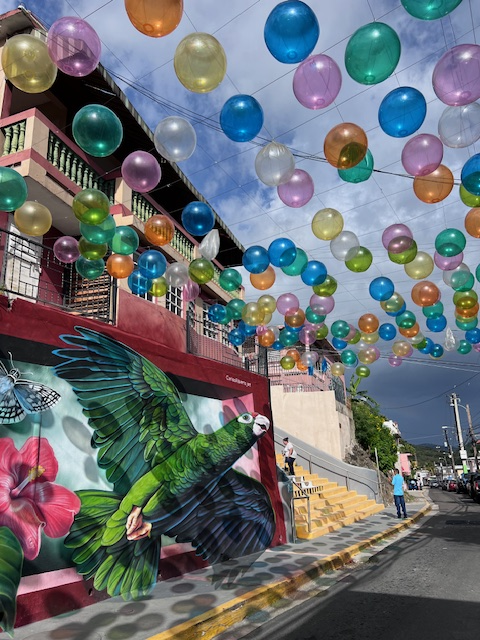

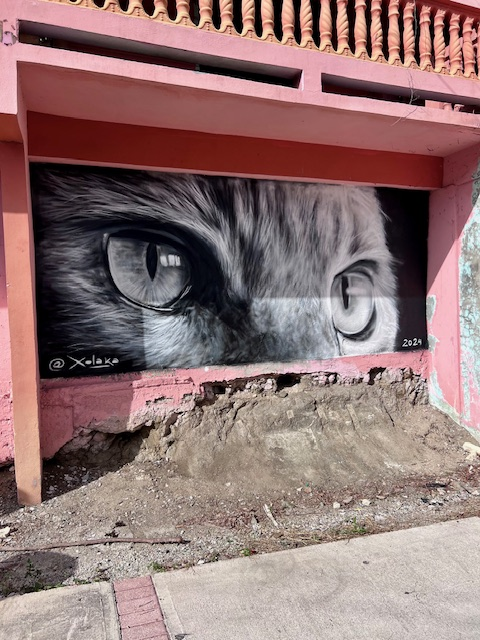

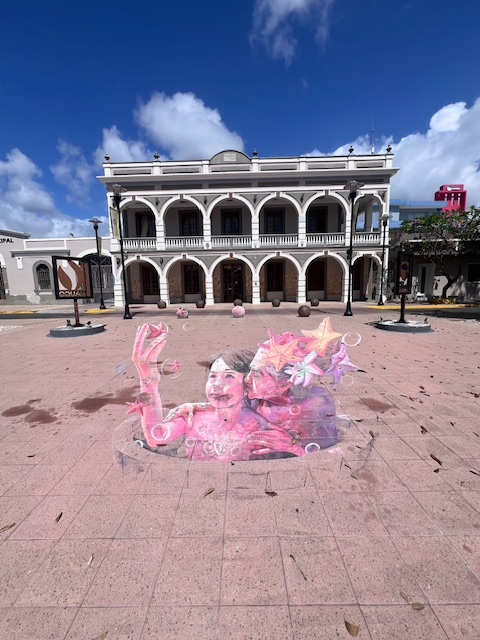

At its heart, Yaucromatic embodies a fusion of vibrant chromatic exploration, local heritage (including Yauco’s coffee-town identity), and the ethos of participatory art — revealing how color and community combined can rewrite the narrative of a place.

== See also ==
- Street art in Ponce, Puerto Rico
- Santurce es Ley
