= Santurce es Ley =

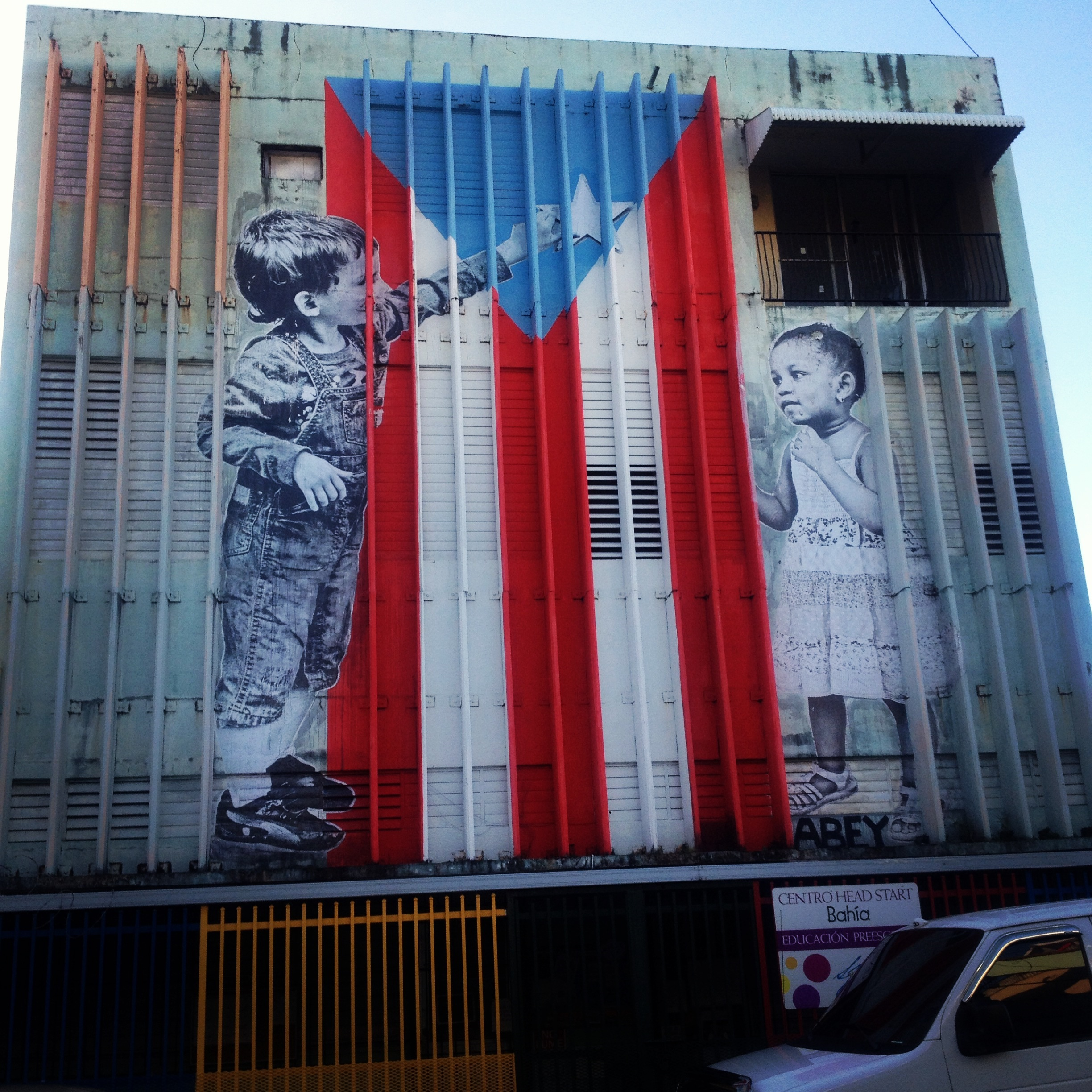
- Genre: Art Movement & Festival
- Frequency: Annual
- Venue: Open air
- Locations: Santurce, near the intersection of Calle Cerra and Calle Hoare
- Country: Puerto Rico
- Website: https://santurceesley.com/

The Santurce es Ley movement began around 2010 in the barrio of Santurce in San Juan, Puerto Rico, as a public mural-and‐urban-art initiative aimed at transforming areas of economic decline and underutilized architecture. By inviting both local and international artists to cover facades of neglected buildings with large-scale murals — especially around Calle Cerra and Calle Hoare — the initiative helped turn these streets into a vibrant open-air gallery.

It is widely credited with stimulating cultural revival in Santurce and positioning the district as one of Puerto Rico’s emerging creative hubs.

Santurce es Ley is distinguished by its fusion of grassroots urban expression with neighborhood regeneration: the murals address social, political and identity themes — from Puerto Rican heritage to contemporary issues of colonialism, neglect and resilience.

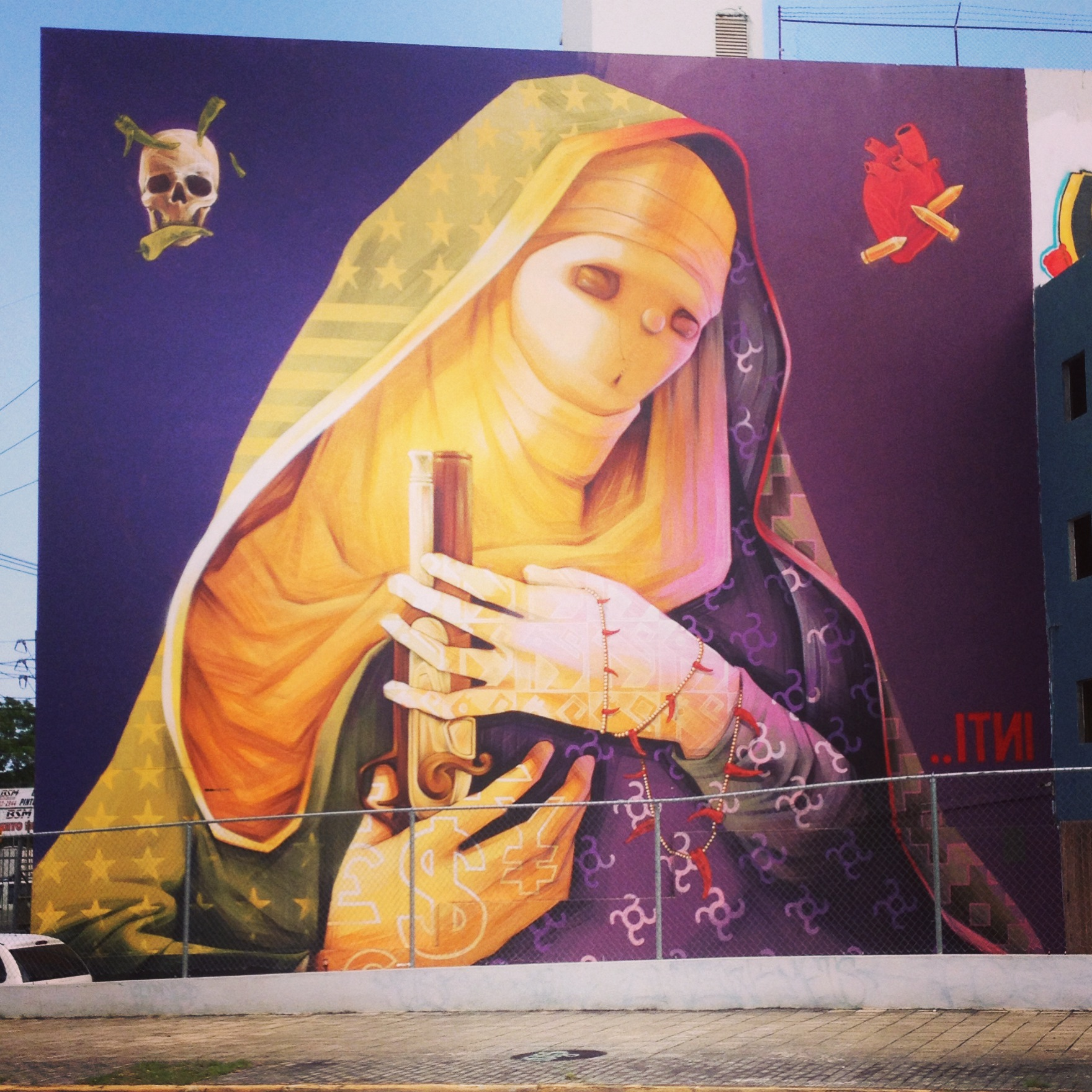
Street art in Santurce

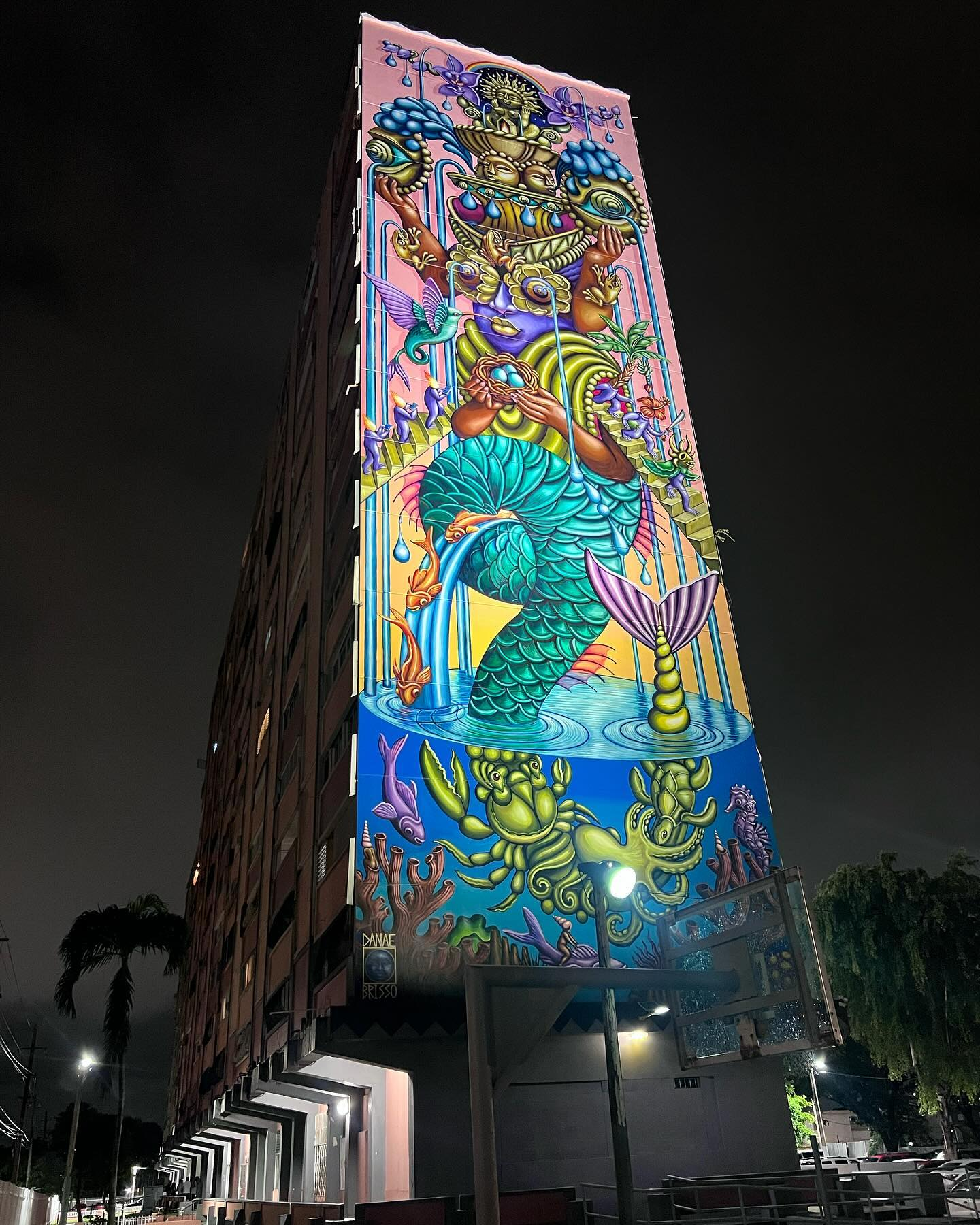
Como Agua by Danae Brisso

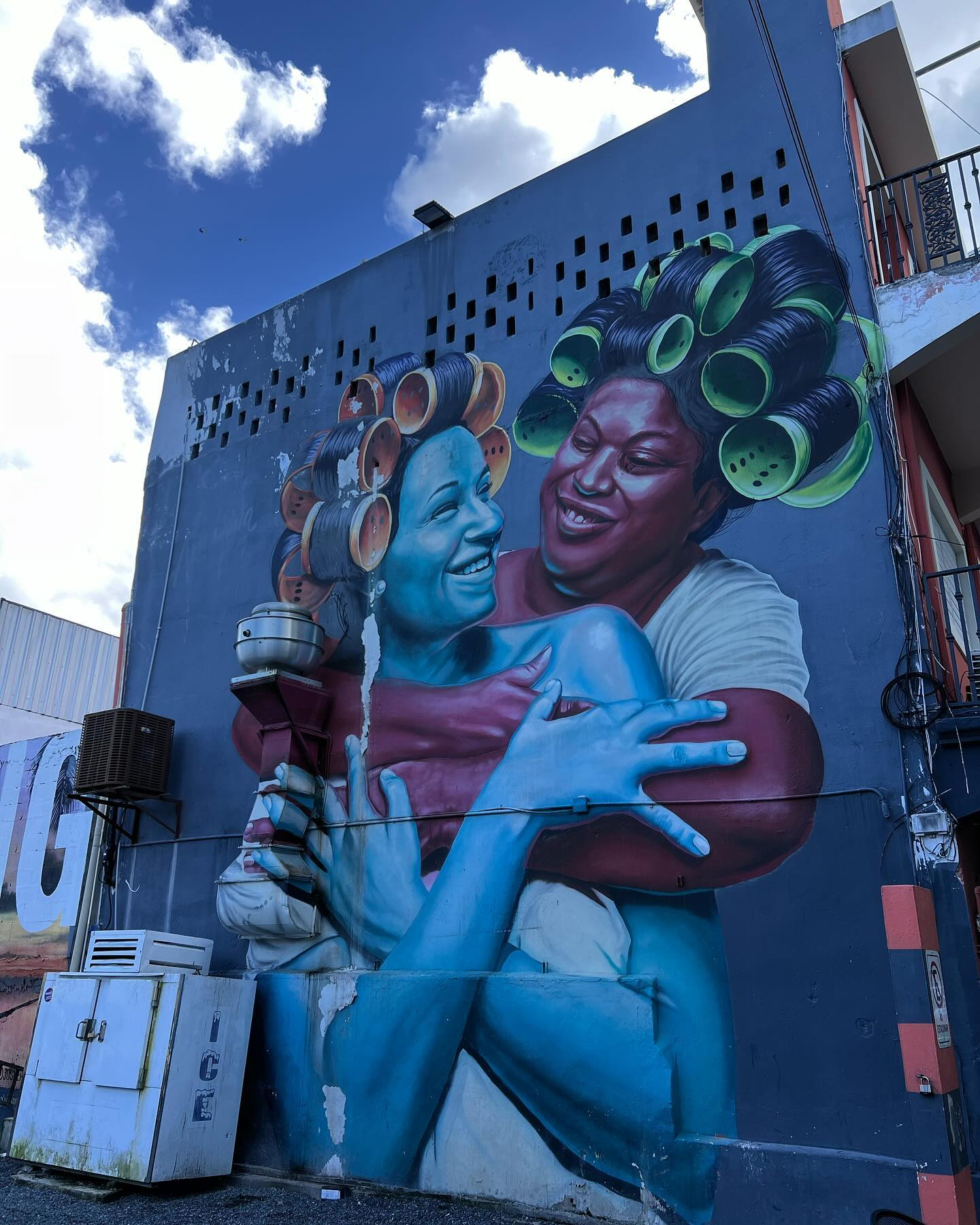
Street art of ladies in Santurce

Using music, gatherings, street-art tours and communal participation, the movement offers more than aesthetics: it has functioned as a catalyst for collective pride and the re-imagining of public space in a post-industrial Caribbean city.

== See also ==
- Comuna 13, Medellín
- Yaucromatic
- Street art in Ponce, Puerto Rico
