= Center of Puerto Rican Art =

Print workshop and exhibition venue

The Center of Puerto Rican Art (Spanish: Centro de Arte Puertorriqueño, CAP) was a print workshop and exhibition venue established by Lorenzo Homar, Rafael Tufiño, José Antonio Torres Martinó, Félix Rodríguez Báez and Julio Rosado del Valle in 1950.

== History ==
Lorenzo Homar returned from studying in New York in 1950 and joined the print workshop at DIVEDCO. It was there he worked under the direction of Irene Delano alongside other Puerto Rican graphic artists. During this time, Homar and the other founding artists were inspired by the nationalist ideas of Pedro Albizu Campos and populist ideas of the Taller de Gráfica Popular. While DIVEDCO employed, inspired, and taught many Puerto Rican artists, it was run and funded by the United States government. The artists believed that there needed to be a new, distinctly Puerto Rican art. With these ideas in mind, they formed the Center of Puerto Rican Art.

The CAP served as a gallery, classroom, workshop, publishing press, and collaborative meeting space for many important Puerto Rican artists during the 1950s. Many stylistic developments in Puerto Rican printmaking took place at the CAP, and the artists experimented collaboratively. The CAP lasted until sometime in the late 1950s, although many of the artists shifted to the Graphic Arts Workshop at the Institute of Puerto Rican Culture in 1957.

== Exhibition and portfolios ==
Despite the short life of the CAP, many young and important Puerto Rican artists were involved in the workshop. The center evolved out of the artistic collaborations going on at the Puerto Rican Division of Community Education and the earlier Estudio 17. The prints produced at the CAP appealed to the masses through populist and nationalist messages, often depicting social aspects of Puerto Rican life. They held an exhibition in 1951 titled La estampa puertorriqueno (The Puerto Rican Print) that included a statement of the organization’s goals. A portfolio of prints from the exhibition was published and available for purchase. This portfolio was collected widely, and the resulting prints are important holdings for museums like El Museo del Barrio and the Museo de Arte de Puerto Rico.

The CAP closed later in the 1950s, but its efforts contributed to a growing printmaking culture in Puerto Rico. Artists from the CAP continued to collaborate and produce portfolios, such as Lorenzo Homar and Rafael Tufiño’s 1953 portfolio Las Plenas.
