= Gloria Rodriguez Calero =

Nyorican Artist Gloria Rodriguez Calero

- Born: Arecibo, Puerto Rico
- Known for: painting, collage and photography
- Website: https://www.rodriguezcalero.com/

Gloria Rodriguez Calero (born in 1959) is an artist. Her usual mediums are paint, collage, mixed-media and photography.

== Early life, education, and career ==
Calero was born in Arecibo, Puerto Rico in 1959, and raised in Brooklyn, New York. She has resided in New Jersey, where she works, for more than twenty years.

She studied under Lorenzo Homar at the Puerto Rican Artists at the Instituto de Cultura, Escuela de Artes Plasticas, and at the Arts Students League of New York with Leo Manso.

== Residencies and recognition ==
She held a National Endowment for the Arts residency at Taller Boricua with fellow artists Marcos Dimas, Gilberto Hernandez, Nestor Otero, Jose Rodriguez, Fernando Salicrup, Jorge Soto, and Manny Vega. She has also held residencies at the Brandywine Workshop Center for the Visual Arts (PA, 1999), and Rutgers Center for Innovative Print & Paper (NJ, 2000). She received the Brooklyn Arts & Culture Association Painting Award from the Brooklyn Museum and Belle Cramer Memorial Prize for Abstract Painting from the National Association of Women Artists. In 2008, she received the Joan Mitchell Foundation Grant in 2008.

She has also received fellowships from the New Jersey State Council on the Arts, Geraldine R. Dodge Foundation and the New York Foundation for the Arts.

In 2003 Calero was selected for with six other artists for national recognition as part of Liquitex 50th Anniversary.

Her work has been featured in New Jersey Networks Public Television State of the Arts Series, "SIGN OF THE TIMES" in 2005 and 2008.

== Exhibitions ==
In 2015, Rodriguez Calero was the first Nuyorican female artist to receive in depth survey of her work at El Museo del Barrio in New York which was guest curated by Alejandro Anreus entitled Gloria Rodriguez Calero: Urban Martyrs and Latter Day Santos.Her work offers deeper social commentary about presentation and symbolism. The exhibit included 29 large acrollage canvases, 19 smaller collages, 13 fotacrolés (altered photography) on canvas board, and 3 works of mixed media on paper produced over three decades. The exhibition was accompanied by a brochure and a scholarly catalogue. The exhibit was reviewed and was given an honorable mention by Hyperallergic of the 20 best NYC exhibits.

== Style and technique ==
Calero has developed a distinct original technique called "acrollage". She employs a variety of papers, colorful glazes of paint and acrylic mediums, and appropriated prints which are layered on the canvas creating striking and highly graphic yet painterly compositions. These were turned into plastic skins that often resemble monoprints. Her smaller prints, which she calls “fotocroles", employ a technique which combines photography, painting, collage, and chine-collé.

Calero's work bears qualities of both classical and contemporary elements, and appear to have been influenced by many things, from surrealist collage, to Catholic iconography and medieval religious painting, to hip-hop and street culture.

Her work offers a balance of the abstract and figurative, sacred and profane, the meditative and boldly graphic. Her work employs bold color and carefully arranged dynamic compositions while offering an empathetic gaze on her subject – subjects of the society she lives in. She embraces and celebrates ethnic groups, as well as LGBT community. Her work explores Afro-Hispanic Imagery and barrio life and demonstrates a belief that everyone, even the most marginalized have dignity and inner worth regardless of social class. Figures in her works preach the gospel for today, reinterpreting community and providing content for the work that is ethnic, political and spiritual and thus at odds with much of the deconstructionist contemporary art of the day.

In her collection Classical Collages, she revisits works by artists such as Artemnesia Gentileschi, Diego Velasquez, Francisco Goya, Francisco de Zurbaran, Edouard Manet, Michelangelo, Picasso, Balthus, and Puerto Rican artists Jose Campeche, and Ramon Frade. In his catalog essay, Rodriguez Calero: The Submerged Voices, Ricardo Alvaro Perez asserts Calero's efforts to juxtapose images and related complexities creating a multidimensional a collective image hybridizing urban New York and Caribbean influences.

== Books and catalogs ==
- Rodriguez Calero: The Classical Collages, 2024
- Rodrigeuz Calero: Urban Martyrs and Latter Day Santos, El Museum del Barrio 2015
- i•den•ti•ty, Merion Hall Gallery at Saint Joseph's University. Philadelphia PA. catalogue
- RazA con “A”, Gallery Space at NYU Wagner. New York City. catalogue 2013
- Exit Art, Alternative Histories New York Art Spaces 1960 to 2010. Taller Boricua
