= Félix Rodríguez Báez =

Puerto Rican painter (1929–2013)

Félix Rodríguez Báez (1929 in Cayey, Puerto Rico – 2013 in Santurce, Puerto Rico), was a Puerto Rican painter, artist, graphic designer, set designer, cartoonist and art teacher.

== Works ==
His works are among the collections of El Museo del Barrio, Museum of Art of Puerto Rico, Museo de Arte de Ponce, Museum of History, Anthropology and Art of the University of Puerto Rico, and private collections. According to Puerto Rican art historian and painter Dr. Osiris Delgado, Félix Rodríguez Báez participated in several local and international art expos like: American Artist Professional League (1948); Edna Coll Academy (1949); Centro de Arte Puertorriqueño (1951); Ateneo Puertorriqueño (1953), University of Puerto Rico (1958) and the First Hispano-American Biennial of Painting (1958). His artwork was signed using the block FeloR.

La Perla, 1955; Oil over masonite

== First years ==
Born in Cayey, Puerto Rico on April 26, 1929. Son of Felix Rodriguez and Juana Baez Nazario Aponte. In 1938 his family moved to San Juan and relocated in Santurce, Parada 22 1/2. In 1945 he studied drawing and painting with Clara Scwabe. He attended Central High School in Santurce, where he graduated in 1947. During his time at the Central (Santurce Central High) School, Rodriguez Baez met Carlos Raquel Rivera (Yauco, Puerto Rico). Among FeloR's teachers were: Jose Hurtado de Mendoza, Hipólito Hidalgo Caviedes, Federico Enjuto, Sparacino Nino and Angel Botello.

== Career ==
After graduating from the Central School of Santurce takes classes at the Academy of Art Edna Coll. Then in 1949, he founded his first studio called Ches les Artistes at Parada 15 in Santurce. Later, he worked as a set designer in the Tapia Theater productions and the University of Puerto Rico. In 1954 he began working as the Director of scenery WAPA-TV. In 1958 participates in the First Hispano-American Biennial of Painting in Mexico, with the work entitled: "The Cathedral " (1956). Then, in the sixties it became one of the most prominent figures in the social realism, with its portraits and landscapes in which reflected life in the inner city of San Juan. In the 1970s FeloR focused his work painting murals, and during the 1980s made political cartoons in defense of the Puerto Rican culture. In 1973 he was appointed Director of Programming Channel 6 WIPR-TV. He was professor and director of the Escuela de Artes Plásticas y Diseño de Puerto Rico. He became director of the Division of Fine Arts of the Institute of Puerto Rican Culture in 1988.

== Puerto Rican Arts Center (Centro de Arte Puertorriqueño, CAP) ==
In 1949, Félix Rodríguez Báez among José Antonio Torres Martinó, Lorenzo Homar, Rafael Tufiño, Julio Rosado del Valle, Carlos Raquel Rivera and Ruben Rivera Aponte establish the Puerto Rican Arts Center (Centro de Arte Puertorriqueño). The Center was located on San Jose Street #152 (2nd floor), Old San Juan In December 1951 Centro de Arte published its first el collective portfolio: La Estampa Puertorriqueña (The Puerto Rican image). Rodriguez Báez contributed to this portfolio with the linocut print titled: La Perla.

== Puerto Rico National Guard Service ==
Served in the Puerto Rico National Guard 2nd Battalion of 295th Infantry Regiment in 1950 Rodriguez Baez was deployed to during the Jayuya Uprising. Later that year, he served as first sergeant for a group of soldiers assigned to the Rio Piedras State Penitentiary.

== Death ==
Rodríguez Báez retires in 1994. During the next few years he would continue painting in his studio located in Old San Juan, Puerto Rico. FeloR, died on March 31, 2013, at 84 years of age.
