= Isabel Bernal =

Puerto Rican artist

Isabel Bernal Rosa (b. San Sebastián, Puerto Rico, February 8, 1935) is a Puerto Rican artist. She is known for her silkscreen prints and paintings, and her works are held in the collections of the Smithsonian Institution, the Museo del Barrio, and the Museo de Arte de Puerto Rico. She is among the generation of Puerto Rican visual artists fostered by and associated with the Puerto Rican Division of Community Education and is among the artists associated with the tradition of post-war poster art in Puerto Rico.

== Early life and education ==
Bernal was born in 1935 in San Sebastián, Puerto Rico. She studied design, drawing, and silkscreen at Mount Mary University in Milwaukee, Wisconsin and then studied painting under Osiris Delgado at the Rio Piedras campus of the University of Puerto Rico graduating in 1957.

== Career ==
Bernal worked at the Puerto Rican Division of Community Education, known by its Spanish acronym, DIVEDCO, from 1957 to 1987, where she was among the artists who developed a Puerto Rican tradition of silkscreen prints and posters. She is known for her portraits and, especially, her rural and urban landscapes.
