= Tufiño =

Tufiño is a surname. Notable people with the surname include:

- Nitza Tufiño (born 1949), Puerto Rican artist
- Rafael Tufiño (1922–2008), Puerto Rican painter
- Rubén Tufiño (born 1970), Bolivian footballer
