= Martín Pérez (artist) =

American musician (1943–1974)

- Martín "Tito" Pérez by Jorge Soto Sánchez
- Born: 1943 – 1974
- Died: December 1974 (aged 30–31); New York City, US
- Known for: Circumstances of death

Martín "Tito" Pérez (1943 – December 1974) was a visual artist and musician of Puerto Rican descent based in New York City. He was involved in the Taller Boricua and the broader Nuyorican movement. Tito Pérez died in police custody under suspicious circumstances and his death sparked protests in East Harlem.

== Life, art, and music ==
Not much is documented about Martín Tito Pérez's life before his time at Taller Boricua. He met the artist Jorge Soto Sánchez in the early 1970s and the two young artists joined Taller Boricua in 1971. Many young Nuyorican artists struggled financially early in their careers and Tito Pérez was known to busk with conga drums in the New York City subway system. Artwork made by Tito Pérez includes paintings as well as prints, often made collaboratively with other members of Taller Boricua. His works are in the collection of El Museo del Barrio.

== Death and controversy ==
Martín Tito Pérez was arrested for disorderly conduct while he was playing conga drums in the subway on December 1, 1974. Police later reported that he had hanged himself with a belt in his cell at the 25th precinct police station in East Harlem. Friends of Tito Pérez claimed that he never wore a belt and many community members believed his death to be a result of police brutality, with the hanging story as a coverup. There were a wide range of responses to his death. Members of Taller Boricua assembled the "December 1st committee" that organized peaceful protests in response to Tito Pérez's death and police brutality. They also posted fliers and prints across New York City to raise awareness, turning Tito Pérez's death into a cause. On December 11, 1974, the Armed Forces of Puerto Rican National Liberation set off a bomb in East Harlem that they labeled their response to Tito Pérez's death. This explosive seriously injured the Puerto Rican NYPD officer Angel Poggi who was tasked with following up on a reported body in an abandoned home.
