= Catalina Parra =

Chilean artist

- Born: May 9, 1940 (age 85); Santiago, Chile
- Education: Self–taught
- Known for: Mixed media
- Movement: Fluxus
- Website: www.catalinaparra.net

Catalina Parra (born May 9, 1940) is a self-taught Chilean artist, famous for her works It's Indisputable (1992) and Imbunches (1977). Parra is a strong feminist, humanist, and advocates for social and political change through her art. "Art doesn't have a gender", she says.

== Early life ==
Catalina Parra was born in Santiago, Chile to famous poet Nicanor Parra and his wife. Violeta Parra, her aunt, was also in the arts - she was a visual artist. Nicanor Parra, however, was most influential to Catalina and offered his liberal and political views on many subjects, which is primarily how Catalina views many subjects today. Catalina moved to Germany in 1968 when she was twenty-eight, but moved back to Chile five years later in 1973 during the dictatorship of General Augusto Pinochet, who ruled until 1990. She then trekked to New York City in 1980 due to his oppression and has lived there ever since. These locations have shaped her artistic ability and style through the political, social, and economic movements that occurred while she was residing in each area.

== Career ==
With a career that spanned for a total of five decades, her many works have been influenced by a great number of events, personal occurrences, and movements in each of the places she has visited throughout the years. During Parra's movement to Germany in the late sixties, her works were influenced by the Fluxus Movement. Following the Fluxus Movement's way of thinking, she created Imbunches, which was a collection of mixed media artworks on a display board. This piece of art represented censorship and the government's use of terror as a method of control. Chile, her native country, was under a dictatorship at this time, and this influenced her way of thinking as well. Parra's move back to Chile under this dictatorship was extremely significant as well; her artwork combines her concern for Chile's political history with the Fluxus Movement's ideals. Her return to Chile found her joining with the popular artists' guild at the time, avanzada, who popularized the use of mixed media featuring articles about current events based on their feelings/morals concerning the Chilean government.

While she lived in New York City, Parra taught high school to those who didn't have access to art in the New Museum—illiterate people, pregnant teenagers, and other people who didn't have many privileges. In an interview with Zoya Kocur, Catalina Parra says that this experience was extremely rewarding: the children had a lot of hidden potential that she hoped to release into the world through their creation of art. She desired to make more students who didn't have high privilege realize the capability that art could provide.

== Works ==
Catalina Parra's works are extremely unusual and feature several different characteristics, yet reflect a common style. Each artwork features collage elements and includes a common mixed media style: thread, newspaper, magazine clippings, photos (either taken herself or from other sources), staples, and other various fabrics. Empty spaces and (often) ripped sections even have significance within her work. A fundamental element in her work is that instead of making the medium the message, she makes the message the medium. She takes what the media portrays as concrete constructs and manipulates them by means of juxtaposition in order to reveal their contradictions and fallacies when applied to everyday reality and history. Through her deconstruction of the media, she depicts how easy it is to manipulate it to portray and/or convey a certain message, any message.

Her most popular works are the Imbunches (1977), No Moaning. No Complaining. No Rehab. Just Laughs.(1999), and It's Indisputable (1992) collections, all of which feature multiple different collages revolving around a common theme – political, social, and economic issues. No Moaning. No Complaining. No Rehab. Just Laughs. is a work that encompasses her personal expression of the Chilean government through her newspaper clipping showing General Augusto Pinochet and Hugo Banzer of Bolivia hugging. This work addresses the possibility of strong relationships between and or within countries. The current event at the time (shown by the newspaper clipping) was the arrest of General Augusto Pinochet, former dictator of Chile, for a request issued by the government of Spain for the murder of Spanish citizens during his dictatorship. His role in the Caravan of Death was also prominent, as the event occurred while he was ruling. So although it does have deeper meaning, it also displays the fact that she was rebelling against his ideas and beliefs through the desecration of his figure in her work. Her collection Run Away, Run Away also examines the switch from dictatorship to democracy because of the actions of Pinochet and gives voice to many Chilean citizens. Through ads and titles created by The New York Times, Parra's collage collection attempts to show the emotions of the general's supporters and opponents. This work features Pinochet's face torn in half and "sewn" back together in the set of nine mixed media collages. Run Away, Run Away was a response to the legal attempts at Pinochet's past deeds and provided her views on this passionate issue. Her indirect views and art, as she had intended, gives the subliminal message to its viewers about the multiple topics she covers because she actually was at risk of being imprisoned upon proper interpretation of her antigovernment propaganda.

Imbunches was definitely her most popular work and contains an encompassing meaning that helps define the path for her continuous works for decades. This work of art represented a Chilean folklore about Chilote del Imbunche, a baby who was sold to a Warlock of Chiloé. This warlock de-baptizes the baby and thanks to this process, the baby becomes a deformed monster used to guard the cave the sorcerer performs in. The Brujo sorcerer sews up each and every hole in the Chilote del Imbunche's body in order to keep the evil from leaving the accursed body and in his service for as long as he lives. This myth is how Parra gets her love for the sewing style she uses in many of her works, as she uses sewing as a main part of her collage as a tribute to the sewing performed in the Imbunche myth. Although in Imbunches, the suturing is a part of the myth she recreated, Parra says the use of suture-looking thread appearing in the rest of her works represents disappearance, wounds, and being shut-out. They connect each part of the collage like lines in a drawing. Imbunches was also used to represent the evil in government—as it had been presented during her time in Chile under the dictatorship of General Augusto Pinochet, she indirectly symbolized his evil ways through her art.

In an interview with Alejandro Anreus, Parra admits a lot about her art style. She says her collage is a combination of Cubism, Surrealism, and primarily Dadaism—she wants to use art as Dadaism does as a way of waking the viewers up to current/past events and allow them to see the truth of social responsibility. Parra uses her influences from Dadaism and her own experiences to create the collages that she does: she will often take long walks and ponder nature around her to set herself in the correct mood for working. She mentions in this interview that she would like to work with video and all of its components in the future.

Catalina Parra was also interviewed by artist educator Zoya Kocur, who is interested in the connection in Parra's works between the aesthetics and pedagogics. Parra says in the interview that she makes art in order to communicate herself to others—yet, the person that she creates art for is herself, and each project is rewarding in its own way. In this interview, Parra says that her art is not just about awareness but also about what she feels is injustice and how she deals with these feelings.

Year	Title	Medium
1975	Manuscritos	Photograph collage
1977	Imbunches	Mixed media
1981	Variaciones Ornamentales	Silent black and white video, 5 mins
1984-?	Have We Got Plans For You	Mixed media
1984-?	Do They?	Mixed media
1987	Reconstructs	Cigarette ad collage
1987	USA, Where Liberty Is A Statue	30-second color video
1989	The Human Touch	Mixed media
1991	Why Wait?	Mixed media collage on posterboard, 28 x 22 in.
1992	Its Indisputable	Mixed media collage on posterboard, 28 x 22 in.
1992	If You Cant See	Mixed media collage on posterboard, 28 x 22 in.
1992	Here, there, everywhere	Mixed media
1993	Its Incomparable	Mixed media collage on posterboard, 28 x 22 in.
1994	Coming Your Way	Mixed media
1998	Photographic Memories	Mixed media collage on posterboard, 28 x 22 in.
1999	Run Away, Run Away	Black and white mixed media collage on posterboard, 28 x 22 in.
1999	No Moaning. No Complaining. No Rehab. Just Laughs.	Black and white/color mixed media collage on posterboard, 28 x 22 in
1999	How Do You Measure Up?	Black and white/color mixed media collage on posterboard, 28 x 22 in
2007	Banderitas Argentinas	Mixed media, 27.5 x 40 in.
2007	Burning House	Mixed media, 39 ¼ x 27 ½ in.
2008	Chromagnon	Mixed media, 27.5 x 40 in.

== United States and Argentina (1980-present) ==
In 1980, Parra received a Guggenheim Fellowship from John Simon Guggenheim Memorial Foundation, which allowed her to move to New York City in the United States. During her time in the United States she used American mass media as her new material.

During this time she created pieces including Coming your way (Banff, 1994), The Human Touch (1989) and Here, there, everywhere (1992). In these works, Parra critically examines military interventions as well as the empty promises of financial institutions and capitalist consumer society. She is most well known for her visual work USA, Where Liberty is a Statue (1987), a thirty-second video that was played on the Spectacolor billboard in Times Square as part of the Public Art Fund project titled Messages to the Public (1982–1990). The art consisted of an animation using the words of her father, the Chilean poet Nicanor Parra. The piece questions the idealized American vision of freedom and liberty. In 1996, Parra's work was included in the exhibition Latin American Women Artists, 1915-1995.

In 1990, Parra taught as an artist-in-residence at El Museo del Barrio, an art school in New York dedicated to teaching varying forms of art to disadvantaged youths. Parra was also recognized in the Latin American Women Artist Association, primarily for her role in educating disadvantaged youths and promoting minority rights. In 1995, Parra received a fellowship from the Civitella Ranieri Foundation in New York City.

In 2000, Parra was given the position of Agregada Cultural de Chile en Argentina (Aggregate of Culture of Chile in Argentina), she worked in this position until 2009, when she once again returned to New York, where she currently resides.
