= Nick Quijano =

Puerto Rican artist (born 1953)

- Born: 1953 (age 72–73); New York City, U.S.
- Education: University of Puerto Rico
- Occupation: Visual artist

Nick Quijano (born 1953 in New York, NY) is a Puerto Rican visual artist whose paintings, sculptures, assemblages, and prints have been exhibited widely in the United States. His works are held at the Museo de Arte de Puerto Rico, Museo de Arte de Ponce, American Museum of Folk Arts, and El Museo del Barrio.

== Biography ==
Nick Quijano was born in New York City in 1953. Quijano started creating art at a young age when a nun at the South Bronx Saint Anthony of Padua Parochial School encouraged him during an arts and crafts lesson. Growing up in New York City, he was exposed to world class art from a young age as well. Quijano’s family traveled to Puerto Rico periodically while he was growing up, but it wasn’t until 1967 at age 13 that his family moved to the island permanently. Quijano received degrees from the University of Puerto Rico in Architecture and Environmental Design.

== Career ==
Quijano achieved early success in his artistic career with awards from the University of Puerto Rico’s 1979 Plastic Arts Competition and the 1983 American National Miniature Show. He quickly became known for capturing the spirit of Caribbean life in his paintings and other works. Usually described as drawing inspiration from folk art, Quijano’s works often depict scenes of everyday life in Puerto Rico. His artwork has been exhibited at the Springfield Museum of Fine Arts, El Museo del Barrio, Galería Pintadera, Instituto de Cultura Puertorriqueña, and Museo de las Américas.
