= Wilfredo Chiesa =

Puerto Rican artist

Wilfredo Chiesa (born 1952) is a Puerto Rican artist.

Chiesa was born in San Juan, Puerto Rico in 1952. He studied at the Escuela de Artes Plásticas y Diseño de Puerto Rico, where he received a BFA in Painting in 1972. In the late 1970s he moved to Massachusetts; in 1979, he became a professor at University of Massachusetts Boston.

== Collections ==
- Lowe Art Museum, Miami
- Museo de Historia, Antropología y Arte, Puerto Rico
- Frost Art Museum, Miami
- Museum of Fine Arts, Boston
- Museo de Arte de Puerto Rico
