= José Antonio Torres Martinó =

Puerto Rican painter, journalist and writer

- Born: José Antonio Torres Martinó; 1916; Ponce, Puerto Rico
- Died: 22 April 2011 (aged 94–95); San Juan, Puerto Rico
- Education: Pratt Institute
- Known for: Painter, artist, Journalist and Writer
- Movement: Impressionism

José Antonio Torres Martinó (1916 – 22 April 2011) was a Puerto Rican painter, artist, journalist and writer. Martinó founded or expanded many of Puerto Rico's major media, artistic and journalism organizations. He was known for abstract paintings, some of which are on display in the collection of the Museum of Art of Puerto Rico.

== Early years ==
Torres was born in Ponce, Puerto Rico, in 1916. The teenaged Torres moved to New York City in 1934, to study at the Pratt Institute in Brooklyn. Financial problems forced him to leave Pratt before completing his degree, and he returned to Puerto Rico.

== Journalist ==
Torres began working as a radio journalist upon his return to Puerto Rico from New York. He co-founded Puerto Rico's first magazine focusing on radio journalism when he was 22 years old. In 2011, Margarita Fernandez Zavala, a professor of art at the University of Puerto Rico, called Torres "one of the pioneers of radio and television on the island", where he became a well known voice for radio and television audiences from the 1940s to the 1980s. His broadcast work extended to producing cultural programming. In addition to his work in radio and television, Torres became a regular arts and culture columnist for El Nuevo Día, a Puerto Rican daily newspaper.

Torres co-founded the Press and Television Guild of Puerto Rico in 1951, and later served as its president.

== Painter and educator ==
Torres continued to paint while working full time on radio, transitioning to painting as a full-time career by the time he was 30. In 1946, he was able to return to his studies, attending the Brooklyn Museum Art School in New York in 1946, then the Accademia di Belle Arti di Firenze, in Florence, Italy, in 1948.

Once back on his home island, Torres' body of work body focused on abstract paintings, many of which were inspired by the southern coast of Puerto Rico near the city of Ponce.

Torres shared his love of art through education and collaboration. In addition to his reach as a journalist, he was a founding member of the Center for Puerto Rican Art, along with Felix Rodriguez Baez, Rafael Tufiño, Lorenzo Homar and others. He also co-founded the Escuela de Artes Plásticas y Diseño de Puerto Rico, and the Hermandad de Artistas Gráficos de Puerto Rico, with Myrna Báez in 1981.

Torres spearheaded the creation of a graphic arts program at the University of Puerto Rico School of Architecture, where he then held workshops for a number of years.

Torres extended his reach by becoming a lifelong student and authority on Puerto Rican art. His work included publications, including Puerto Rico: Art and Identity.

== Death and honors ==
Jose Torres Martinó died in Santurce, San Juan, Puerto Rico, on 22 April 2011, at the age of 94. He is honored at Ponce's Park of the Illustrious Ponce Citizens.
