= Jorge Soto Sánchez =

Jorge Soto Sánchez (1947-1987) was a Puerto Rican visual artist from New York City. He is known for his involvement in the Nuyorican movement and the Taller Boricua. His work often incorporated elements of Pre-Columbian as well as Afro-Latinx visual culture. As such, he is often regarded as an important proponent of intersectionality in Latin American art.

== Biography ==
Jorge Soto Sánchez was born in East Harlem in 1947 to parents who had relocated from Puerto Rico. His family moved to the South Bronx when he was still young. He received early encouragement in art, with scholarships to take art classes. He visited Puerto Rico often while growing up, including an extended stay in 1960. He enrolled in the United States Army after dropping out of high school. He was released from the army in 1965.

He became involved in the Nuyorican movement in the 1970s after associating with Taller Boricua in 1971. He taught art classes at El Museo del Barrio during this time. He continued to travel to Puerto Rico and studied Taino and other Pre-Columbian art and culture. He also studied pre-eminent Puerto Rican artists from the 20th century and earlier, like Francisco Oller and Jose Campeche.

His career was successful, especially with local Nuyorican circles in East Harlem. He served as director of Taller Boricua for a few years. During the 1980s he became ill and relocated to Vermont, where he died on December 13, 1987. It is believed that he died of AIDs.

== Art ==
The work of Soto Sánchez is held in many institutions, including the Smithsonian American Art Museum, City University of New York, and El Museo del Barrio. His first major exhibition was in 1979 at Galeria Tanama in Arecibo, Puerto Rico in 1973. He also had major solo exhibitions at the Association of Hispanic Arts in 1977, and El Museo del Barrio in 1979.

Soto Sánchez's art has been described as surrealist, grotesque, and mask-like. His work often combined diasporic African and Caribbean symbols with the urban landscape, incorporating a critical protest style typical of Nuyorican art at the time. A retrospective of his work was organized at the City University of New York’s Hostos Center in 2015.
