= Frances Gallardo =

Puerto Rican artist

Frances Gallardo (born 1984) is a Puerto Rican artist. Her work has been featured at the Museum of Art of Puerto Rico.

== Education ==
Gallardo graduated with BFA in Drawing from the University of Puerto Rico and an MFA in Studio Art from Cornell University.

== Influences ==
According to the Castro Barreto Collection, Gallardo "incorporates the medium of paper and its infinite uses in the creation of art". Her work is also inspired by the effects of Hurricane Maria in Puerto Rico.
