= Martín Pérez =

Martín Pérez may refer to:

- Martín Pérez (artist), Nuyorican artist and musician
- Martín Pérez (baseball) (born 1991), Venezuelan baseball pitcher
- Martín Pérez (politician), Peruvian politician
- Martín Pérez de Ayala, Spanish bishop
- Martín Pérez Disalvo (Coscu), Argentine eSports player and singer
- Martín Pérez Guedes, Argentine footballer
- Martín Perezlindo, Argentine footballer
