= Elías Adasme =

Chilean visual artist and essayist

Elías Adasme is a Chilean multimedia visual artist, graphic designer, art teacher and essayist of contemporary art. His work focuses on the Chilean working class. His work has been featured at the Museum of Art of Puerto Rico.
