= Anreus =

Anreus is a surname. Notable people with the surname include:

- Alejandro Anreus (born 1960), Cuban art historian, curator, and critic
- Idalia Anreus (1932–1998), Cuban actress
