= Julio Rosado del Valle =

Puerto Rican painter

- Julio Rosado del Valle
- Born: Julio Rosado del Valle; 1922; Cataño, Puerto Rico
- Died: September 20, 2008 (aged 85–86); San Juan, Puerto Rico
- Known for: Painting
- Movement: Abstract expressionism

Julio Rosado del Valle (1922 - September 20, 2008), was an internationally known abstract expressionist.

== Early years ==
Rosado del Valle was born in Cataño, Puerto Rico and as a young child would always be drawing or painting. In his primary school his teachers recognized his artistic talents. After graduating from high school, Rosado del Valle enrolled in the University of Puerto Rico, where he took art classes under guidance of Cristobal Ruiz.

In 1946, Rosado del Valle went to New York where he attended "The New School for Social Research" and studied under the guidance of the Cuban painter Mario Carreño and the muralist Camilo Egas. A year later in 1947, Rosado del Valle moved to Paris, France where he visited museums and art exhibitions. He later went to Italy where he attended "The School of Fine Arts" in Florence.

== "Puerto Rican Arts Center" ==
A del Valle abstract painting

In 1949, Rosado del Valle returned to Puerto Rico, where he worked in the Division of Community Education. He was also named resident artist of the University of Puerto Rico. In 1950, he was the co-founder, along with Torres Martino, Lorenzo Homar, Felix Rodriguez Baez and Rafael Tufino, of the "Puerto Rican Arts Center".

In 1952, he won a gold medal for mural painting in New York, sponsored by the Architectural League of New York and in 1957, Rosado del Valle was awarded a scholarship from the Guggenheim Memorial Foundation. In 1965, Rosado del Valle won a gold medal for his art work, from the "Friends of Puerto Rico Society of New York". His work has been categorized as abstract expressionism and has been recognized locally and internationally.

== Exhibitions ==
In 1967, Rosado del Valle represented Puerto Rico in the "Latin-American Art Exhibition" celebrated in the Palace of Beautiful Arts in Mexico. In 1998, he won the art and culture award from the "New York State Puerto Rican Hispanic Task Force Conference." Rosado del Valle has had many international and local exhibits, including in the Museo de Arte de Ponce (1982), The Museum of Contemporary Art (1988) and The Luigi Marrozzini Gallery (1993) in San Juan, Puerto Rico, and in the United States and Europe. One of his few non-abstract works 'Carmencita' is part of the permanent collection of Museo de los Santos y Arte Nacional in the Santurce Arts District of San Juan, Puerto Rico.

== Later years ==
In the year 2002, a fire completely destroyed a warehouse in Carolina in which he had stored hundreds of his paintings. The University of Puerto Rico bestowed upon him an honorary Doctorate Degree in Humanities in 2004. Until he was no longer able, Julio Rosado del Valle got up every morning and painted in his house, which was located in Guaynabo, and then he went to his paint shop in Cataño to work.

He died from Kidney failure in San Juan, Puerto Rico in September 2008. A retrospective of his work opened at the Museo de Arte de Puerto Rico (MAPR) in late 2008.

== See also ==
- List of Puerto Ricans
