= Nitza Tufiño =

Mexican artist

- Nitza Tufino, Printshop Director at Taller Boricua.
- Born: 22 March 1949 (Age 77); Ciudad de México, México
- Education: Academia San Carlos, Universidad Autonoma de Mexico (B.F.A) Hunter College (M.S.)
- Occupation: Director of the Rafael Tufiño Printmaking Workshop (RTPW)
- Known for: Public art and murals
- Website: www.nitzatufino.com

Nitza Tufiño (b. 1949) is a Puerto Rican and Mexican public artist, muralist, printmaker, art educator and community art activist. She has been a part of developing multiple community-based art organizations and a catalyst for the growth of several institutions in the New York metropolitan area, as well as having involvement in the Nuyorican movement and culture. Nitza Tufiño continues to serve as an active member in el Consejo Grafico Nacional and as the Director of the Rafael Tufiño Printmaking Workshop. Her art is inspired by her Caribbean-Latina identity, cultural empowerment, and non-western historical narratives.

== Background ==
Born in Mexico City and raised in Puerto Rico, Nitza Tufiño spent much of her early life traveling between San Juan and Manhattan. In her youth, she learned graphic arts while working with her father, Rafael Tufiño, a Puerto Rican artist known locally as “The Painter of the People.” During her time at Academia de San Carlos, Tufiño met and was inspired by David Alfaro Siqueiros. After earning a B.F.A. from the Universidad Nacional Autónoma de México, she moved to New York City.

== Awards and Activism ==
Nitza Tufiño played an integral role in the development of the education department at Taller Boricua, where her commitment to public art led her to be recognized as the organization’s first woman-identifying artist in 1970. In addition to being one of the earliest members of Taller Boricua, Tufiño was a co-founder of El Museo del Barrio alongside other Puerto Rican artists, educators and activists. She also developed the first Muralism Program at Central Connecticut State University. Nitza continues her membership in el Consejo Grafico Nacional, a national coalition of Latino printmaking workshops and individual printmakers, and fulfilling her role as Director of the Rafael Tufiño Printmaking Workshop .

Nitza Tufiño at the Annual Consejo Grafico Nacional meeting held in Austin, Texas, 2019. Top row left to right: Fifth person, Nitza Tufiño.

She has received numerous awards including one from the Puerto Rican Legal Defense and Education Fund, the 1991 “Outstanding Puerto Rican Professional in the Arts Awards” from the Office of Andrew Stein, New York City Council President and the Association of Hispanic Arts, as well as grants and fellowships from the New York State Council on the Arts and the National Endowment for the Arts.

== Artwork and Exhibitions ==
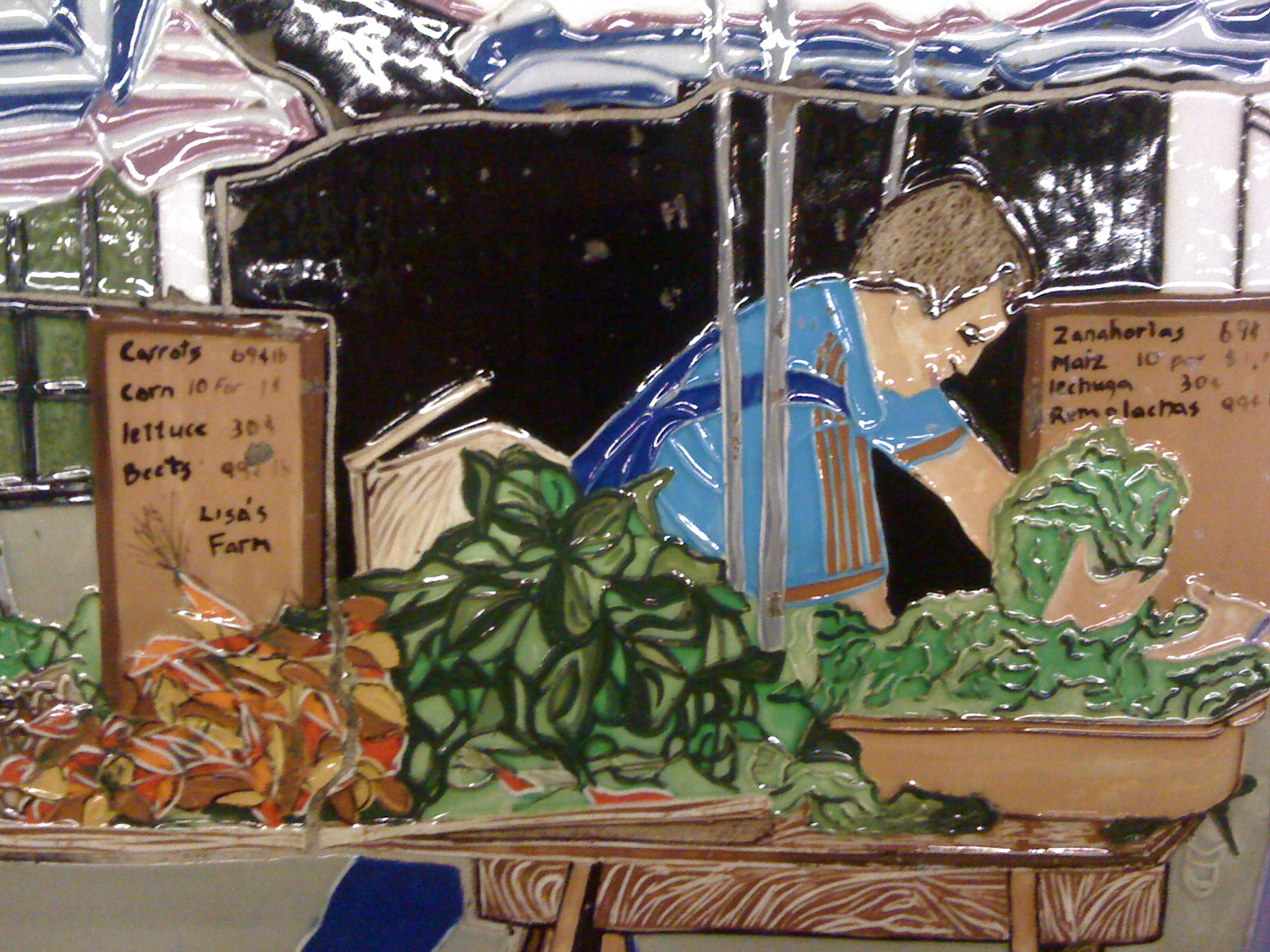
Westside Views, Nitza Tufiño, 1989. In collaboration with Elizabeth Montalvo (produce stand) and Leeama Blugh (shaved-ice cart) 86th St. station (at Broadway), New York City

As a cofounder of El Museo del Barrio in 1969, the museum's façade was the site of Nitza Tufiño's first public mural. Her ceramic murals have been commissioned for a number of public locations including the 103rd Street and Lexington Avenue subway station, the Third Street Music School, and LaGuardia Community College. Her ceramic mural for P.S. 12 depicts scenes from Brooklyn's West Indian Day Parade, held annually on Labor Day. Nitza Tufiño was the first artist of color commissioned by the MTA Arts & Design for her murals. She has been featured several in exhibitions and facilitated programs at noteworthy institutions such as the Claire Oliver Gallery, the Hudson River Museum and the Allentown Art Museum.
