= José López de Victoria =

Puerto Rican painter

José López de Victoria (1869–1930) was a Puerto Rican painter. Known primarily as a portraitist, López de Victoria painted many important intellectuals and politicians from the island. His works can be found at the Museo de Arte de Puerto Rico, Instituto de Cultura Puertorriqueña and the University of Puerto Rico Museum of History, Anthropology and Art.

== Career ==
José López de Victoria was born in 1869, although not much is known about his early life. It is unknown if he received a formal training in art. While he is known as a renowned portraitist, he also created a series of landscape painting that experimented with color theory. He painted many important Puerto Rican intellectuals and cultural figures like Cayetano Coll y Toste, Luis Muñoz Rivera, José Gautier Benítez, Eugenio María de Hostos, José Severo Quiñones, Manuel Zeno Gandía, Francisco Oller, Genaro Cautiño Vázquez and others. He won an award from the Ateneo Puertorriqueño in 1913. In 1925 he was commissioned by the United States Government to paint portraits of George Washington and Calvin Coolidge, which hung in the Capitol Building.
