= Luis Cruz Azaceta =

Cuban-American painter (born 1942)

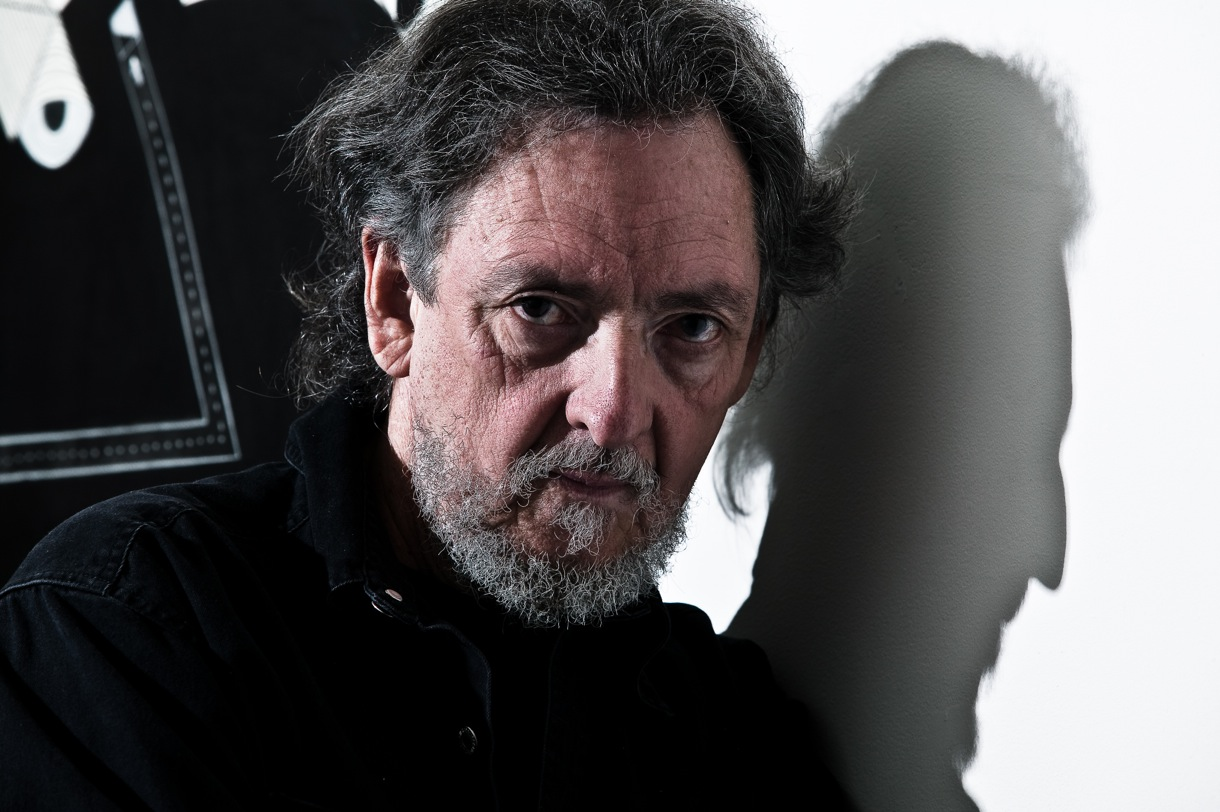
- Born: 1942; Havana, Cuba
- Education: School of Visual Arts, New York
- Known for: Painting, Printmaking
- Awards: Guggenheim Fellowship, New York Foundation for the Arts

Luis Cruz Azaceta (born April 5, 1942) is a Cuban-American painter.

Azateca has been painting and drawing since the late 1970s. In usually large-format works executed with expressive colors, Cruz Azaceta has dealt with themes of urban violence, personal isolation in a large and overcrowded city, the conditions created by mismanaged government, the abuses and oppression of dictatorships, and in a number of works done in the late 1980s, the ravages of AIDS.

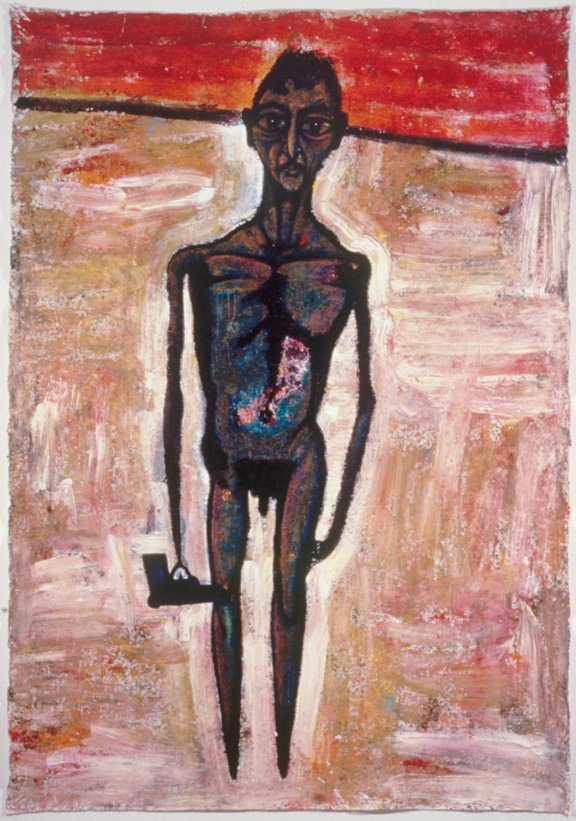
Gun Man (1986), 120x84 inches, acrylic on canvas

== Early life and work ==
Luis Cruz Azaceta was born in Havana, Cuba. As a teenager, he witnessed many acts of violence on the streets of Havana: bombs in stores, cinemas and theaters, shoot-outs, arrests, and torture of citizens by Batista secret police. In 1959, the Cuban revolution brought jubilation and celebration when Castro promised to restore Cuba's constitution and free elections. Months later, executions began and businesses were confiscated, with some closing. Azaceta's experiences under both Batista and post-revolution impacted his vision—creating a sensitivity towards violence, human cruelty, injustice, and alienation—which later become central themes in his work.

At 18 years old, Azaceta left Cuba for New York City. In 1969, he graduated from the School of Visual Arts in Manhattan. After graduation, he developed series of works addressing the human condition. In 1975, he had his first solo show at the Allan Frumkin Gallery on 57th Street, exhibiting works from the Subway Series. In the mid-1970s, at the beginning of his career, Azaceta tended to fill his compositions with numerous cartoony images and figures which were boldly colored and clearly outlined. Many of the paintings articulate a shallow cramped space. Azaceta frames the urban dweller as a threatened figure, someone who is constantly being pushed, pulled, and squeezed by both the environment and other people.

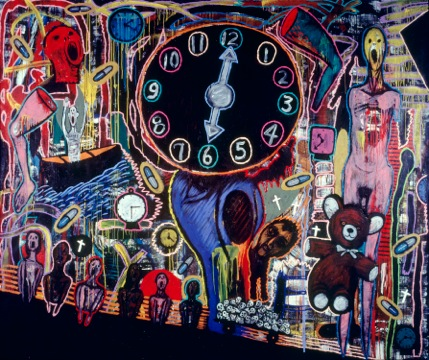
The Plague, AIDS Epidemic (1987), 120x144 inches, acrylic on canvas

While Azaceta's "apocalyptic pop" style characterized his initial entry into the art world, he soon moved to different art styles. Critic John Yau argues that Azaceta's need to change is not only one of the features that distinguishes him from other painters, whether figurative or abstract, but it is also emblematic of his life as both an exile and an alien.

By the 1980s, his cramped compositions shift to a centralized, nude figure (often self-portrait) that dominates the composition. The mood and color are somber, and the figure is often distorted.

His work throughout the 1970s and 80s is described as socially engaged neo-expressionist.

== Later life and work ==
In the early 1990s, his work incorporated figuration and abstraction, extending from some of the works of the AIDS Epidemic Series, where abstraction is present as an ominous abyss. He returned to the subject of Balseros and Exiles as there was an increase of those fleeing Cuba in 1994. In 1992, he moved with his wife and two sons from New York to New Orleans where a warehouse studio provided him space for producing larger scale works, constructions, and installations. He began shooting photographs of the New Orleans environment which become attachments in his paintings. He also introduces new materials into his work, such as twisted metal studs, nails, wood, board, plastic barricade fencing, and weathered sheet metal. The newfound materiality and subject of exile connect in his 2008 installation, SWEPT AWAY, from his Post Katrina series, which was presented at Prospect New Orleans He created numerous series afterwards, including the Museum Plans, Shifting States, Shootings in Sandy Hook, and the Boston Bombing.

With Museum Plans, Azaceta calls into question the individuals and institutions who govern culture by depicting labyrinths of lines devoid of exits.

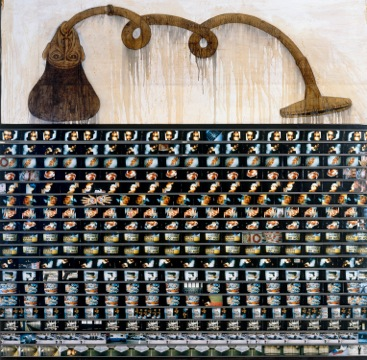
Real Fiction (1996), 105x108x4 3/4 inches, mixed media on wood & metal studs

The series Shifting States (2011-2012) related to contemporary struggles such as crumbling economies, revolutions, wars, civil movements against social injustice, and climate change. The title of the series has a double meaning, referring both to physical major changes and to the psychological state that involves moving into self-awareness in order to create necessary transformation.

In his most recent series "Shootings in Sandy Hook" and "The Boston Bombing", Azaceta addresses mass shootings and domestic terrorism.

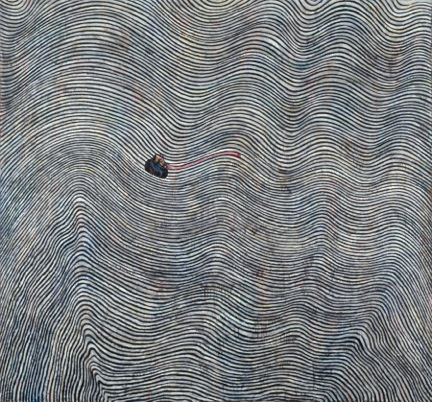
The Crossing (1999), 112x120 inches, acrylic, charcoal, shellac on canvas

Azaceta's work has been featured in more than 100 solo exhibitions in the U.S., Europe, and Latin America. His work was displayed at the Whitney Museum of American Art, New York, in the exhibition entitled, "I, YOU, WE", curated by David Kiehl, and at the Smithsonian American Art Museum, Washington, D.C., in the exhibition entitled, "OUR AMERICA: THE LATINO PRESENCE IN AMERICAN ART," curated by E. Carmen Ramos.

In his 2013 solo exhibition Dictators, Terrorism, War and Exiles at Aljira, Center for Contemporary Art, curator, Alejandro Anreus writes that Luis Cruz Azaceta is committed "to bearing witness to the political crisis of humanity. His work reflects how he identifies with isolation and oppression and speaks to both the horror and determination that is a part of the journey towards survival and freedom."

== Awards and recognition ==
He has received awards and grants such as the National Endowment for the Arts, The Guggenheim Memorial Foundation Grant, The Joan Mitchell Foundation Grant, the Pollock/Krasner Grant, the Penny McCall Foundation Award, the New York Foundation for the Arts, the Mid-Atlantic Grant for Special Projects, and the Cintas Foundation.

== Collections ==
His work is housed in numerous museum collections, some of which include: The Museum of Modern Art, New York; The Metropolitan Museum of Art, New York; The Whitney Museum of American Art, New York; the Smithsonian American Art Museum, Washington, D.C.; the Museum of Fine Arts, Boston; the Delaware Art Museum in Delaware, Virginia; the Museo De Arte Moderno in Santo Domingo, Dominican Republic; the Museo De Bellas Artes in Caracas, Venezuela; the Artium Museum in Victoria-Gasteoz, Spain; the Kendall Art Center in Miami, Florida; and the Museo De Arte Contemporaneo De Monterrey in Monterrey, Mexico. Azateca's work is also featured in the collection of the Pérez Art Museum Miami, Florida.
