= Graphopoli =

Urban Art Biennale held in Puerto Rico

GRAPHOPOLI is the first edition of an Urban Art Biennale curated by Celina Nogueras Cuevas, developed by the Museum of Art of Puerto Rico (MAPR) and sponsored by UBS Financial Services. With an open call for portfolios last April the MAPR drafted the best urban artists from the Island and challenged them to transform giant scale structures into eye-catching urban landmarks. The artists had an opportunity to intervene uncommon places such as a water pump, a student residence building, a sport center, a lighthouse viewpoint and a water tank, among others. A selection committee which consisted of international figures such as infamous Miss 17 from NY and artist/editor of Swindle Magazine, Sonik (Boston) among local professionals selected the artists that were to participate in the event.

GRAPHOPOLI accommodated the contestants in two categories: solo and crew. Artists such as BIKISMO, SOFIA, LARREGUI, NEPO and PUN18, preceded the solo artist category. Each artist challenged concepts of everyday life and propaganda, such as consumerism and visual exploitation, gentrification, femininity, fantasy, childhood among others. The second category composed by: ADMcru, COROGRAFICO and OS Crew, transformed ordinary structures and walls with their signature styles: a combination of playful personages, colorful urban settings, and remarkable photo-like creations. This first edition of GRAPHOPOLI captivated various municipalities of Puerto Rico that instantly adopted this innovative program into their art and cultural enhancement plan.
