= Osiris Delgado =

American art historian

- Born: 1 April 1920; Humacao, Puerto Rico
- Died: 19 March 2017 (aged 96); San Juan, Puerto Rico
- Occupations: historian, painter

Osiris Delgado Mercado (1920-2017) was a Puerto Rican artist and art historian. He is primarily known for his contributions to the history of Puerto Rican art, but he also taught in the Department of Fine Arts at the University of Puerto Rico. Delgado's artworks are held at various museums across the island, such as the Museo de Arte de Ponce, the Museo de Arte de Puerto Rico, the Institute of Puerto Rican Culture, and the University of Puerto Rico Museum of History, Anthropology and Art.

== Biography ==
Osiris Delgado was born in Humacao, Puerto Rico on April 1, 1920. He studied with José López de Victoria, Ramón Frade and Alejandro Sánchez Felipe at a young age. During the 1930s and 1940s he studied at the Royal Academy of Fine Arts in Florence, the Porta Romana Royal Institute of Fine Arts in Florence and art academies in Paris and Madrid. He obtained a bachelor's degree at the University of Puerto Rico and then completed a PhD in 1954 at the Complutense University of Madrid. After his studies, Delgado returned to the island and taught at the University of Puerto Rico while becoming involved in cultural institutions, such as the Institute of Puerto Rican Culture. He wrote several books on the history of art in Puerto Rico and frequently contributed essays to newspapers and magazines. His books on Francisco Oller, José Campeche and the plastic arts in Puerto Rico are some of his most important contributions.

== Death ==
Osiris Delgado Mercado died on March 19, 2017 at Hospital del Maestro in San Juan, Puerto Rico, at the age of 96.
