= Música de Cámara =

American non-profit organization

Musica de Camara (Spanish for Chamber music) is a non-profit organization, based in New York, devoted to presenting classical music concerts in and around New York City venues including schools. It has supported more than 125 Hispanic and non-Hispanic classical music musicians since its founding in 1979 by Eva de la O, herself a soprano.

== Director ==
Eva de la O grew up in New York and Puerto Rico and studied at the Juilliard School in Manhattan. She founded Musica de Camara in 1979, wanting in part, to help educate people on Puerto Rican classical music. De la O, who has performed on Broadway is a singer, and teacher of soprano and founded Musica de Camara to showcase Puerto Rican, Caribbean as well as non-Hispanic classical musicians. Her Chamber Music (as it is known in English) was launched at the nearby Museo del Barrio. De la O has worked with the Puerto Rico Symphony Orchestra. On May 4, 2019, she died from lung cancer and was subsequently honored at Música de Cámara's 39th founding anniversary on May 17 at El Teatro of El Museo del Barrio.

== Awards ==
- National Endowment for the Arts
- Borimix/SEA
- Comité Noviembre
