= Eva de la O =

Nuyorican opera singer (1931–2019)

Josephine Evangeline de la O, known as Eva de la O, (January 19, 1931 — May 4, 2019) was an American soprano singer and director of Música de Cámara. Her principal goal was to promote classical music of Puerto Rico, which she pursued with the foundation of Música de Cámara two years after her debut at Carnegie Recital Hall on May 6, 1977.

== Biography ==
=== Early life and start ===
On January 19, 1931, she was born in East Harlem, Manhattan to Puerto Rican immigrants José de la O and Margot Melchor of Vega Alta. They were former teachers, but José became a bookkeeper and Melchor a seamstress before becoming the director of the Puerto Rico Water Resources Authority when José repatriated. She was raised in East Harlem during the Great Depression. Initially wanting to be a flamenco dancer, Melchor pressured her at age 7 into taking piano lessons with María Luisa Lecompte, the last companion of violinist Claudio Brindis de Salas Garrido. However, her grandmother removed her from them. When 9-years-old, her grandmother introduced her to Manuel Ponce's serenade "Estrellita" (1912). Once Melchor arrived at the house, she was convinced to allow de la O to pursue singing.

At 14-years-old, her family returned to San Juan, Puerto Rico, where she was taught by Alicia Morales, a former companion of Antonio Paoli. However, she graduated from the High School of Music & Art. She continued her studies at the University of Puerto Rico before earning a scholarship at the Juilliard School, graduating with a bachelor's degree in music with specialization in operatic voice and chamber music. There she studied under Alberta Mosiello of the Metropolitan Opera and Arthur Lief. She then studied ethnomusicology at Hunter College, educational psychology and pedagogy at City College, and arts administration at New York University. She got her start in Ghent, Belgium, appearing at the Music Festival in Santiago de Compostela, Spain for composer Alberto Ginastera. Writing for the Puerto Rican newspaper El Nuevo Día, music critic Sylvia Lamoutte described her performance of Claude Debussy's L'enfant prodigue with the Puerto Rico Symphony Orchestra as "…demonstrating a security in the high registers that easily filled the wide stage, as did her dynamics, which was delicate and emotional".

=== Career and later life ===
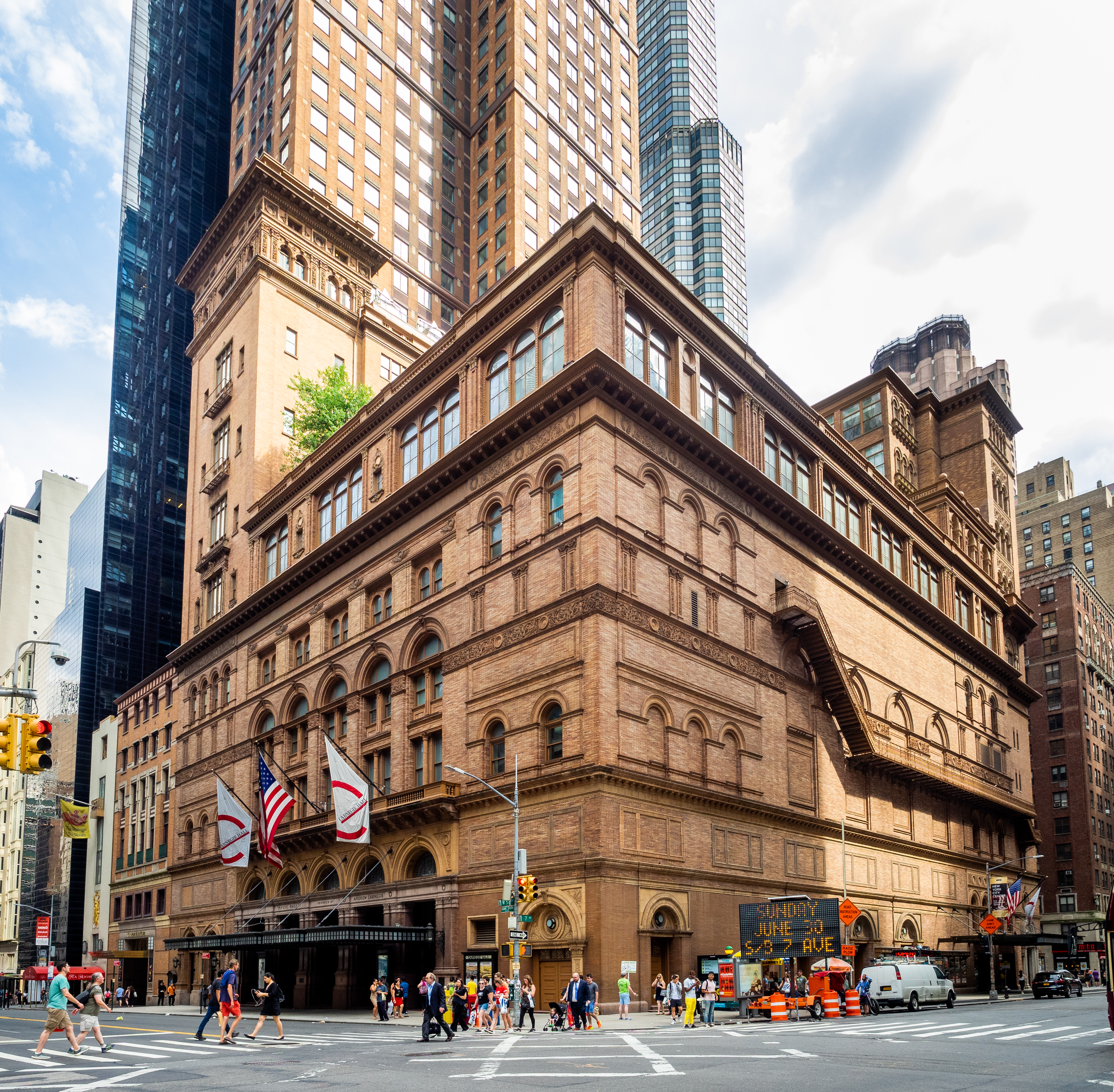
Carnegie Hall, 29 June 2019

On May 6, 1977, she made her official debut performing "Latin art songs" from 8 countries, including Spain, at Carnegie Recital Hall with Jacquelyne Silver. However, she performed there before and music critic John Rockwell described her tone as "breathy and colorless, the agility limited and support weak[,] [y]et […] evenly produced and decently handled". Two years later, she founded Música de Cámara to promote classical Hispanic, although primarily Puerto Rican, musicians, motivated by their underrepresentation. In a 1986 interview with Tim Page from The New York Times, she directly labeled the genre "tremendously eurocentric" and that "musical tradition in North and South America […] has been all but ignored."

In January 1987, she resided in Miami, Florida and was planning Música de Cámara's first performance there. By this time she had financial backing, but still lamented in 1989 the lack of government funding for the arts. In 1994, Música de Cámara's two grants from the National Endowment for the Arts increased. By October 1995, she was worked under Hollaender International Artists of Management and was making an opera arias CD for MGM Records in Europe.

She married percussionist Morris "Arnie" Lang and journalist "Mr. Medina", with both marriages ending in divorce. She had two sons with Lang, David and Peter (died 2012), and a daughter, Sara Medina, with Mr. Medina; from her sons, she had 6 grandchildren by 2019. On May 4, 2019, she died in Manhattan from lung cancer.

== Awards ==
Additionally being celebrated by the Conferencia Nacional de Mujeres Puertorriqueñas in 1994 and El Diario La Prensa in 2008, she has received awards including:

- Vocal Award (1992) by the Generoso Pope Foundation
- Latina Excellence Award (1995) by the magazine Hispanic

== See also ==
- Culture of Puerto Rico
- El Museo del Barrio
- List of Puerto Rican musicians
- Nuyorican Movement

== Sources ==
=== Bibliography ===
- Merino, Juan Fernando (March 18, 2007). "Eva de la O alma latina de la música de cámara". El Diario La Prensa. Vol. 39, no. 1319023. New York City. pp. 24–25. ISSN 0742-9428. ProQuest 368354190.
