= Alejandro Anreus =

Cuban-American art historian

Alejandro Anreus is a curator, art historian and critic who has focused his research on Latin American Art. Though he began his career as an artist, Anreus is now an art historian and poet, and is professor of art history and Latin American/Latino Studies at William Paterson University. Among his many accomplishments, Anreus is a two-time recipient of the Oscar B. Cintas Foundation and has worked as a curator with public collections such as the Montclair Art Museum and the Jersey City Museum during his career.

== Early life and education ==
Alejandro Anreus was born in Havana, Cuba on 11 September 1960. He later migrated to the United States as a result of the Cuban Exile of 1950s-1970s and settled down with his mother, two aunts and grandmother in Elizabeth, New Jersey. Anreus earned his Bachelor of Arts in art history at Kean College, where he was influenced and mentored by Marxist art historian Alan Wallach, and then his Master of Arts and Doctor of Philosophy at The Graduate Center, CUNY.

== Career ==
=== Artistic Practice ===
From 1981 through 1987 Anreus was represented by Schweyer-Galdo Galleries, Bloomfield Hills, Michigan, where he had a one-person exhibition of his drawings every two years. After a hiatus, he participated in American Voices in 2004, his last exhibition, a two-person linoleum prints and photography exhibition with photographer Julio Nazario, Edge Art, Rahway, New Jersey.

=== Curatorial practice ===
Alejandro Anreus has worked as Curator at the Jersey City Museum (1993-2001) and the MontClair Art Museum. He also regularly participates in panels and seminars on Latin American art and art and politics of the 1930s. Exhibitions such as Ben Shahn and The Passion of Sacco and Vanzetti at the Jersey City Museum, Juan Sánchez: Printed Convictions, Subversions/Affirmations: Jaune Quick-to-See Smith, A Survey and Bending the Grid: Luis Cruz Azaceta at the Aljira Center for Contemporary Art in Newark, NJ have been part of his curriculum as a curator. In 2015, he guest curated the exhibition Gloria Rodriguez Calero: Urban Martyrs And Later Days Santos, Museo Del Barrio, New York.

== Works and publications ==
Alejandro Anreus has focused critically on the role of politics within the modernity of Latin American and Latino Art. Covered in his research are topics such as muralism, political art of the 1930s and the life and work of Latino artists. His articles have appeared in Art Journal, Third Text, Art Nexus and Encuentro de la Cultura Cubana. His most recent publications are Ben Shahn and The Passion of Sacco and Vanzetti (Jersey City Museum and Rutgers University Press, 2001), Orozco in Gringoland: The Years in New York (University of New Mexico Press, 2001), and The Social and The Real; Political Art of the 1930s in the Western Hemisphere (Penn State Press, 2006), which he co-edited with Diana L. Linden and Jonathan Weinberg. Since 2003, Professor Anreus has been part of the national advisory board of the "A Ver" series of monographs. This is the first series of monographs focused on living Latino artists. This multi-volume project was funded by the Getty and Rockefeller Foundations and is based at the Chicano Studies Department at UCLA. He has lectured on notable topics such as Latin American Visualities at Lehigh University Art Galleries in 2006, and Revising Orozco at the Pomona College Museum of Art in 2014. Professor Anreus completed Mexican Muralism, A Critical History (in collaboration with Leonard Folgarait of Vanderbilt and Robin Adèle Greeley of UConn), which was published by University of California Press at the end of 2012. In 2014 he published a monograph on Cuban-American painter Luis Cruz Azaceta. Anreus was a panelist at the conference on Modern Cuban Art in New York: The MoMA Exhibition of 1944 at the CUNY Graduate Center in 2014. As a poet he has authored Memento mori (2010) and Los exilados suenan (2013).

== Awards ==
- 1979: Oscar B. Cintas Foundation
- 1986: Oscar B. Cintas Foundation
- 1990: New Jersey State Council on the Arts, Individual Artist Grant (Drawing)

== Selected exhibitions ==
- 2004: American Voices (two person with photographer Julio Nazario), Edge Art, Rahway, New Jersey
- From 1981 through 1987 Anreus was represented by Schweyer-Galdo Galleries, Bloomfield Hills, Michigan, where he had a one-person exhibition every two years
- 2015:Gloria Rodriguez Calero: Urban Martyrs And Later Days Santos, Museo Del Barrio, New York

== Public collections ==
- Art Museum of the Americas, Washington, DC
- The Art Institute of Chicago
- The Detroit Institute of Art
- Museo del Papel Omar Rayo, Roldanillo, Colombia
- Museo José Luis Cuevas, Mexico City
- Zimmerli Art Museum, Rutgers University, New Brunswick, NJ
- The Montclair Art Museum, Catedral de Puebla, Puebla, Mexico
