= Belle Cramer =

American painter 1883-1978

- Born: Belle Klauber; August 11, 1883; New York, New York
- Died: September 9, 1978 (aged 95); Saint Louis, Missouri
- Known for: Painting

Belle Klauber Cramer (1883 -1978) was an American painter.

Cramer was born on August 11, 1883 in New York City. She attended the Edinburgh College of Art, the St. Louis School of Fine Arts, and the University of Southern California. Cramer died on September 9, 1978 in Saint Louis, Missouri.

Cramer's work is in the collection of the Mildred Lane Kemper Art Museum, and the Saint Louis Art Museum
