= Lorenzo Homar =

Puerto Rican graphic artist (1913–2004)

- Lorenzo Homar; Homar designed the logo of the "Instituto de Cultura Puertorriqueña " (Institute of Puerto Rican Culture) known as the ICP, and he also established the Institute's Graphic Arts Workshop.
- Born: Lorenzo Nicolás Homar Gelabert; September 10, 1913; San Juan, Puerto Rico
- Died: February 16, 2004 (aged 90); San Juan, Puerto Rico
- Education: George Bridgman
- Known for: graphic artist
- Movement: Graphic artist
- Awards: Puerto Rican Institute of Culture's National Medal of Honor

Lorenzo Nicolás Homar Gelabert (September 10, 1913 – February 16, 2004) was a Puerto Rican printmaker, painter, and calligrapher whose artwork stretches to three main workshops: Centro de Arte Puertorriqueño (CPA), DIVEDCO (División de Educación a la Comunidad), and the Taller de Artes Gráficas of the Instituto de Cultura Puertorriqueña (ICP). Homar was also the designer of the logo of the Instituto de Cultura Puertorriqueña (Institute of Puerto Rican Culture).

== Early years ==
Lorenzo Homar was born in 1913 in Barrio Puerta de Tierra in San Juan, Puerto Rico. His father, Lorenzo Homar Sr., was a film promoter and his mother, Margarita Gelabert, a pianist. Although he attended grammar school in San Juan, in 1928 due to financial difficulties, his family is forced to move to New York City. Because of the financial situation of his family, Homar did not finish his high school education and went to work in a textile factory. In 1931, he attended New York's Art Students League where he learned the art of drawing under the guidance of George Bridgman.

Homar joined the House of Cartier in 1936 in New York as an apprentice designer of jewelry. During this period of his life he studied engraving, drawing and history of design. Furthermore, the income from his position at Cartier allowed Homar to take night classes in painting, design and typography at Pratt Institute.

== World War II ==
When the United States entered World War II, Homar joined the Army. He participated in the Pacific Campaign and was wounded in the Philippines for which he received the Purple Heart Medal. Homar then served in an Army Intelligence Unit where he learned cartography while working for the Second Amphibious Combat Engineers Brigade. He also published military sketches in numerous American journals. When he returned from the war, he enrolled in the School of the Brooklyn Museum of Art in 1946. While there, he was able to meet and learn from such artists as Ben Shahn, Rufino Tamayo and Gabor Peterdi.

== Early Career in Puerto Rico ==
Homar returned to Puerto Rico in 1950, where together with some other quite famous artists, such as Rafael Tufiño, Felix Rodriguez Baez, Julio Rosado del Valle and René Marqués, he co-founded the "Centro de Arte Puertorriqueño" (Puerto Rican Arts Center, or CAP). He was later named the director of the Graphics Studio of the Graphic Art Division of Puerto Rico's Department of Community Education (DivEdCo). This is when he created most of his works of art. Homar designed the logo of the "Instituto de Cultura Puertorriqueña " (Institute of Puerto Rican Culture) known as the ICP, and he also established the Institute's Graphic Arts Workshop. During the decade of the 1960s Homar began use the techniques of graphic printmaking, particularly in silkscreen. In 1975, he established his own printing studio, and among his many works are the posters he designed in 1979, for the VIII Pan American Games.

His thirty year career in Puerto Rico was celebrated at the Poster House, New York City, in its 2025 exhibit Puerto Rico in Print: The Posters of Lorenzo Homar.

== Honors and recognitions ==
Homar's works were exhibited in the Ponce Museum of Art in 1979. The Metropolitan Museum of Art purchased some of his works. The University of Puerto Rico proclaimed him a Doctorate "Honoris Causa" and the Puerto Rican Institute of Culture presented him with the National Medal of Honor in 2003.

== Military awards and recognitions ==
Among Homar's military decorations and medals were the following:

- Purple Heart
- Asiatic-Pacific Campaign Medal with two Bronze Service Stars
- World War II Victory Medal
- Philippine Liberation Medal

== Later years ==
On February 16, 2004, Lorenzo Homar died in Barrio Puerta de Tierra in San Juan, Puerto Rico.

== See also ==
- List of Puerto Ricans
