= Puerto Rican Division of Community Education =

Agency that produced cultural materials

The Puerto Rican Division of Community Education (Spanish: División de Educación de la Comunidad, DIVEDCO) was an agency established in 1949 with the purpose of producing cultural materials for public education on the island of Puerto Rico. Local writers, artists, community organizers, filmmakers and musicians were employed by DIVEDCO to create works and programs in their respective fields on topics of public interest such as literacy, health care, democracy and civic engagement. The agency was a product of the Popular Democratic Party of Puerto Rico under Luis Muñoz Marín following the party’s rise to power during the 1948 elections. Rural and poor citizens with limited access to public resources were the primary target audience of DIVEDCO, although their cultural products had widespread impact on Puerto Rican society and culture broadly. DIVEDCO was most active between the 1950s and the 1970s. The agency halted production around 1989.

== Establishment ==
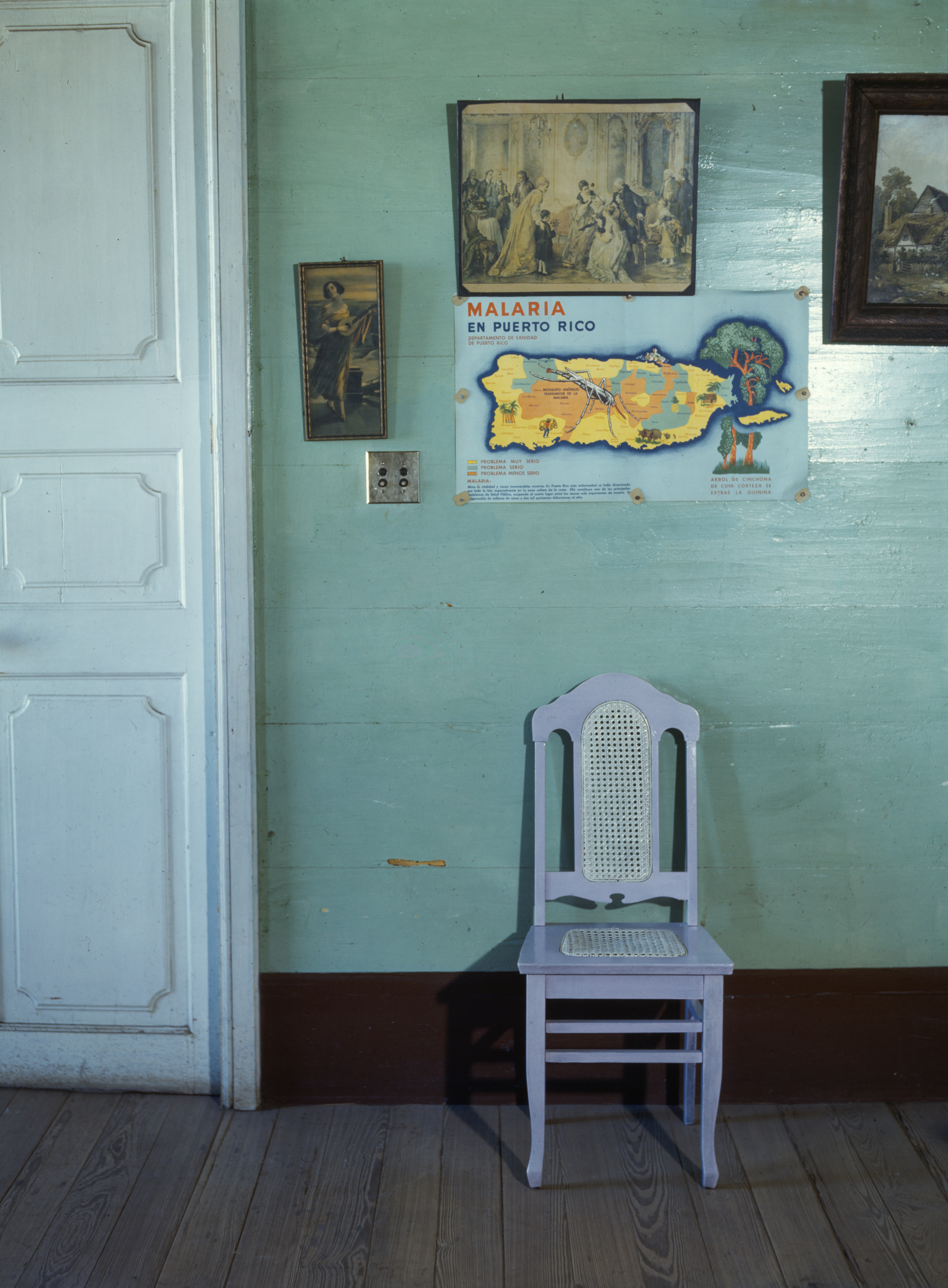
Malaria poster in small hotel, San Juan, Puerto Rico. Jack Delano, December, 1941.

After the 1898 transfer of Puerto Rico into the jurisdiction of the United States, the island saw a remodeled educational system to fit federal standards. Efforts to combat illiteracy rates were combined with public enthusiasm for democratic ideas about popular education on the island, which the Popular Democratic Party of Puerto Rico was at the forefront of. Fueled by post-WWII and Cold War political anxieties, many governments turned to state-led programs in order to legitimize and disseminate the tenants of democracy to their citizens. Luis Muñoz Marín envisioned a program to provide Puerto Ricans with exemplary materials to base their work and self-governing on.

In the 1940s, the Puerto Rican government watched as federal programs in mainland United States like the Works Progress Administration and the Farm Security Administration were liquidated. Muñoz Marín met with former WPA and FSA employees Edwin Rosskam, Jack Delano and Irene Delano to provide a public plan for the dissemination of educational materials in Puerto Rico based on New Deal cultural policies. In 1946, the Puerto Rican Senate approved the formation of an audiovisual unit under the Commission of Parks and Public Recreation. This unit was directed by Julio Enrique Monagas and included Jack and Irene Delano. After Muñoz Marín was elected governor in 1948, he and his team began work on new educational program. This program became DIVEDCO and was established on May 14, 1949 after passing through the legislature.

== Impact ==
While the efforts of the Popular Democratic Party of Puerto Rico and DIVEDCO contributed to the progress of the island, these efforts also had a hand in greater Americanization of Puerto Rican citizens. Institutions and programs like DIVEDCO, Operation Bootstrap, the Puerto Rico Information Service and the Caribbean Commission projected images of a developed, capitalist and non-communist Puerto Rico into the public narrative on the island.

DIVEDCO provided an avenue for young artists in Puerto Rico to create popular works that made up a government sponsored art legacy on the island. Many of the artists who participated in the program became internationally acclaimed representatives of Puerto Rican culture, such as Rafael Tufiño Figueroa, while others have been largely forgotten by the art world due to systematic neglect of art outside the European tradition.

== Films ==
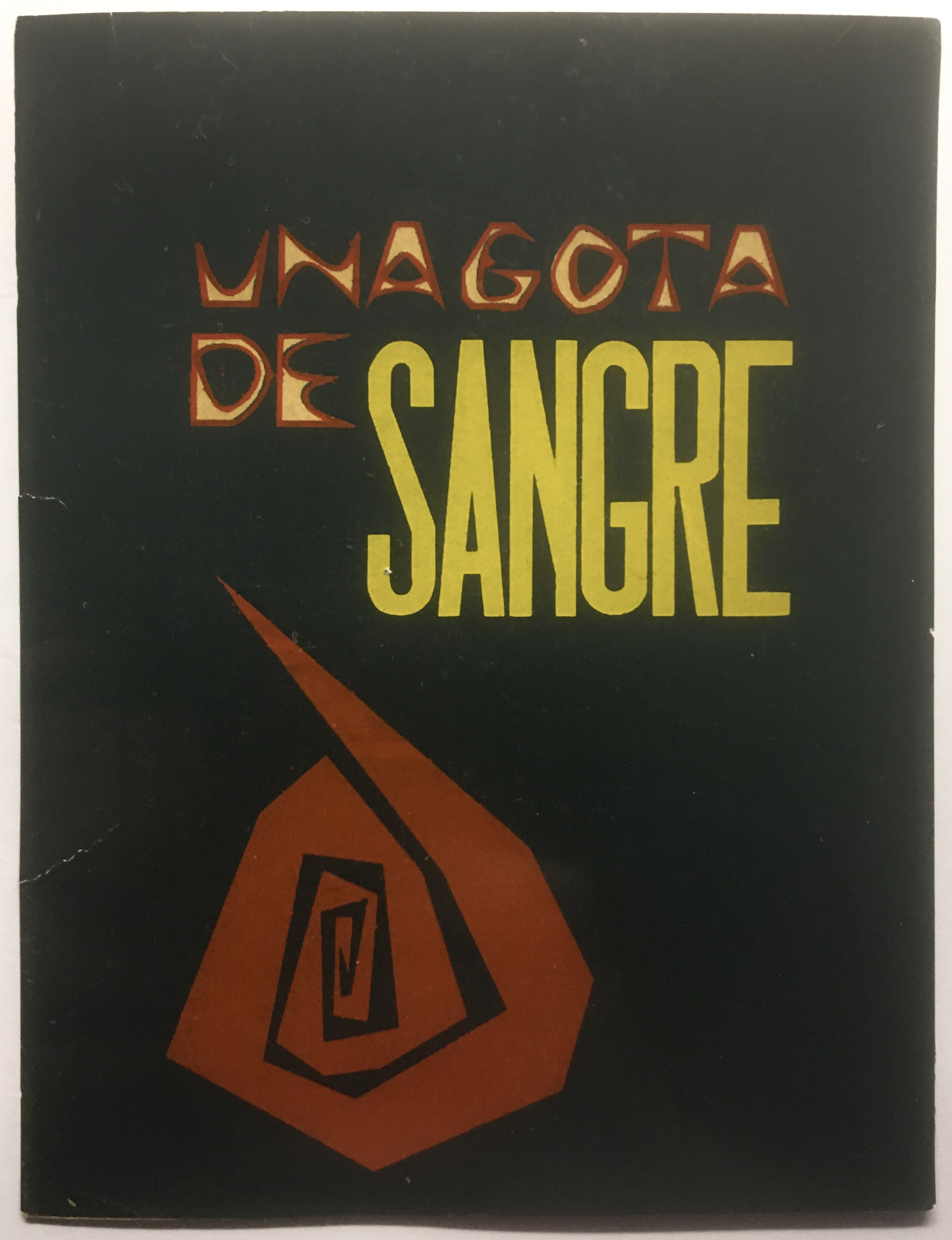
Una Gota de Sangre by Carlos Osorio, 1963

Due to the goals of DIVEDCO, the films produced under the program often appear as propaganda for the Popular Democratic Party of Puerto Rico and their ideological beliefs. Many of the films document public projects, like Amílcar Tirado’s 1954 The Bridge, which depicts the building of a bridge to give access to a local school in a rural community. The 1963 film A Drop of Blood documents and promotes the process of blood donation on the island. Benjamín Doniger’s 1958 Hurricane sought to educate residents about the proper safety precautions in the event of a hurricane.

Other films such as Luis Maisonet’s 1955 I, Juan Ponce de León tell the story of historical events related to Puerto Rico. The 1952 film Cabo Rojo documents the history of the town of Cabo Rojo, on the Southwestern coast of the island. DIVEDCO produced several feature length narrative films as well, such as the 1959 Intolerance and Michel Alexis’ 1961 Belén.

== Visual art ==
In addition to employing major Puerto Rican printmakers like Rafael Tufiño Figueroa and Lorenzo Homar, many other visual artists had a hand in DIVEDCO. Film and event posters were the most common two-dimensional visual art production items in the agency. Other artists included Jose Melendez Contreras, Miguel Antonio Lebron, Juan Diaz, Isabel Bernal, Eduardo Vera Cortes, Antonio Maldonado, Carlos Osorio, Rene Marques and others.
