= Escuela de Artes Plásticas y Diseño de Puerto Rico =

Art school in San Juan, Puerto Rico

Coordinates: 18.467741°N 66.121293°W

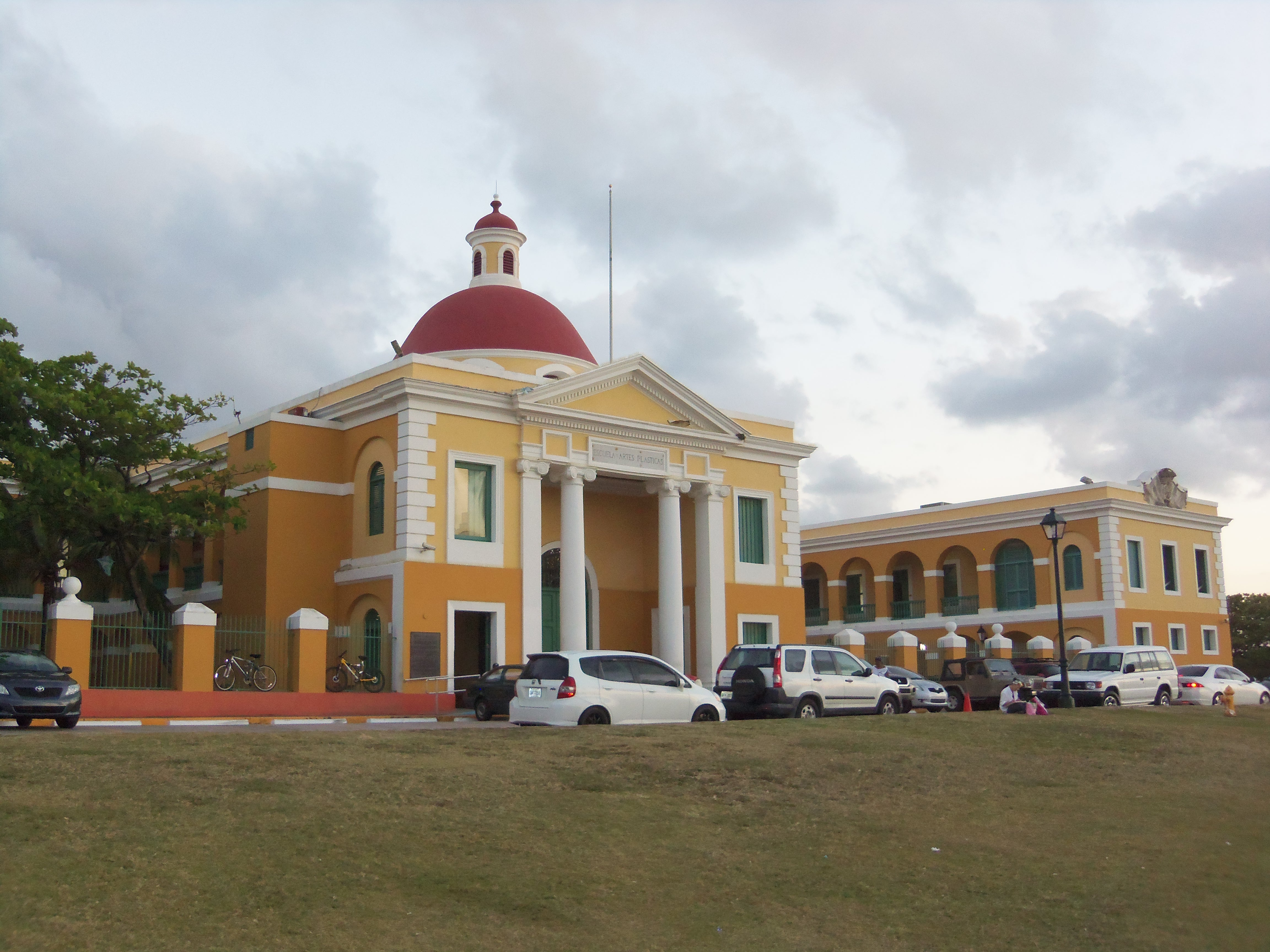
- Type: Public, Four-year Undergraduate
- Established: 1965; 61 years ago
- Location: San Juan, Puerto Rico
- Campus: single, urban setting
- Website: http://www.eap.edu/
- Hospital de Nuestra Señora de la Concepción el Grande
- U.S. National Historic Landmark District – Contributing property
- Part of: Distrito Histórico del Viejo San Juan – Old San Juan Historic District (ID72001553)
- Added to NRHP: October 10, 1972

The Escuela de Artes Plásticas y Diseño de Puerto Rico (English: School of Plastic Arts and Design of Puerto Rico) is an institution of higher learning engaged in the training of students in the visual arts. It is located in Old San Juan, San Juan, Puerto Rico. The school was founded in 1965 as part of the Institute of Puerto Rican Culture.

== History ==
The establishment of an arts school had been envisioned by Ricardo Alegría for some time. When a $25,000 grant was available, Secretary of Education Ramón Mellado informed him of it and the funds were assigned to the project. Alegría intended for Fran Cervoni to be its director. An old warehouse at Old San Juan was its first locale. Despite the state of the building, Alegría was satisfied. Painter José Antonio Torres Martinó was one of the school's co-founders. Lorenzo Homar, an experienced artist affiliated to the ICP, opposed the idea due to considering the founding insufficient for a project of this magnitude and that it could endanger the existing institute initiatives.

Ultimately José Oliver was the first director, with Cervoni, Francisco Vázquez, Tomás Bautista, Amadeo Benet, Carlos Marichal and Arturo Dávila as professors. Myrna Báez, Rubén Moreira and Rafael Ríos Rey would later serve as professors.Initially it offered a bachelor’s degree in arts (which included photography, engraving, drawing, techniques and materials, ceramics, sculpture, painting and design, calligraphy, murals, mosaics, general Puerto Rican culture and polychromatic glass) was offered. Alegría later proposed courses to train teachers that could be integrated to the public system. As an autonomous school it was created by an amendment of legislation by the Legislative Assembly of Puerto Rico in 1971, and achieved its definitive form and autonomy under Public Law 54 of August 22, 1990.

The school offers bachelor degrees in seven concentrations: graphic arts, photography and design (with specialties in digital graphic design and photography and motion), art education, sculpture, painting, industrial design and fashion design. Today, the school is Puerto Rico's foremost institution of higher education in the visual arts. The building used to be the Insular Madhouse or Manicomio Insular.

== Gallery ==
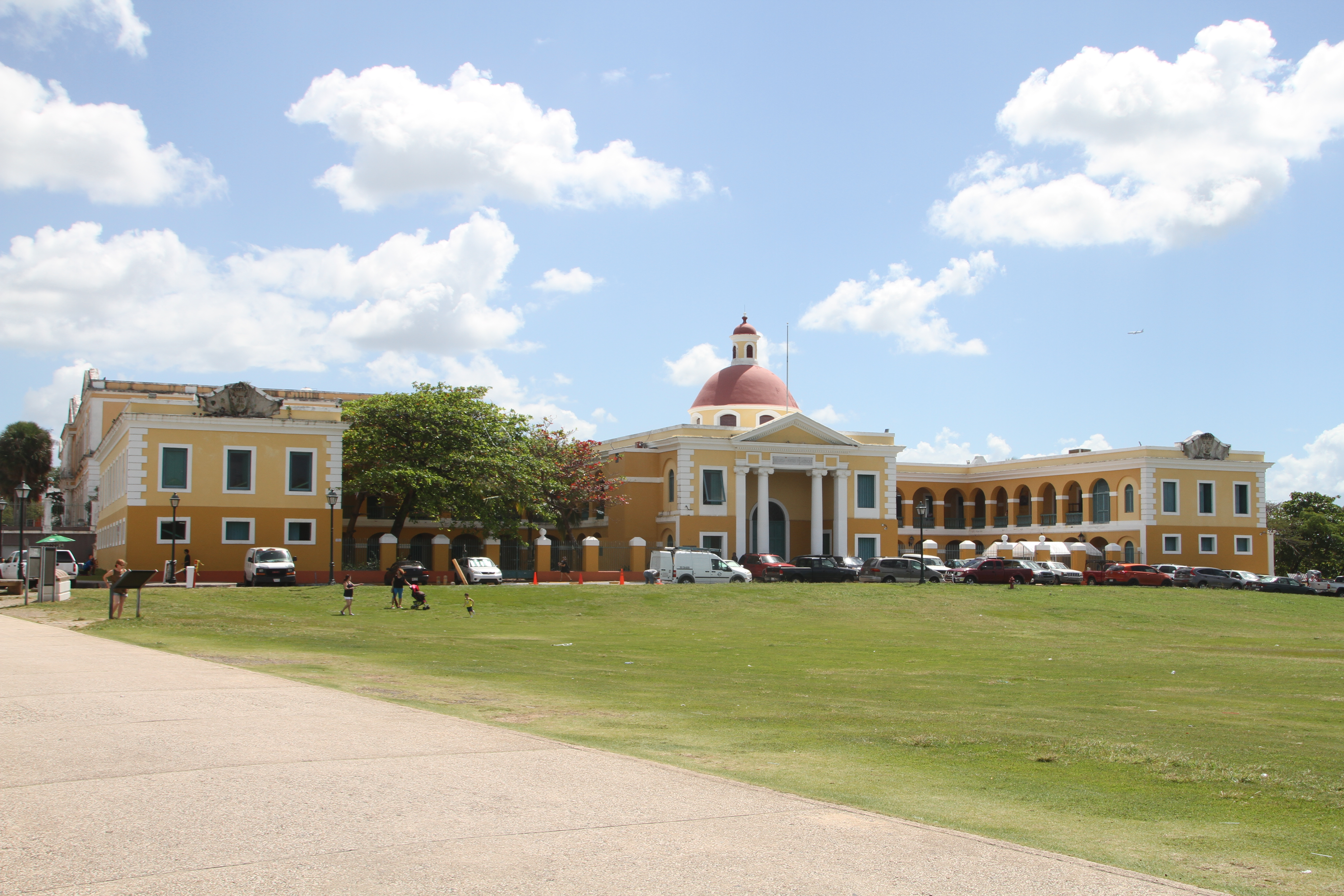

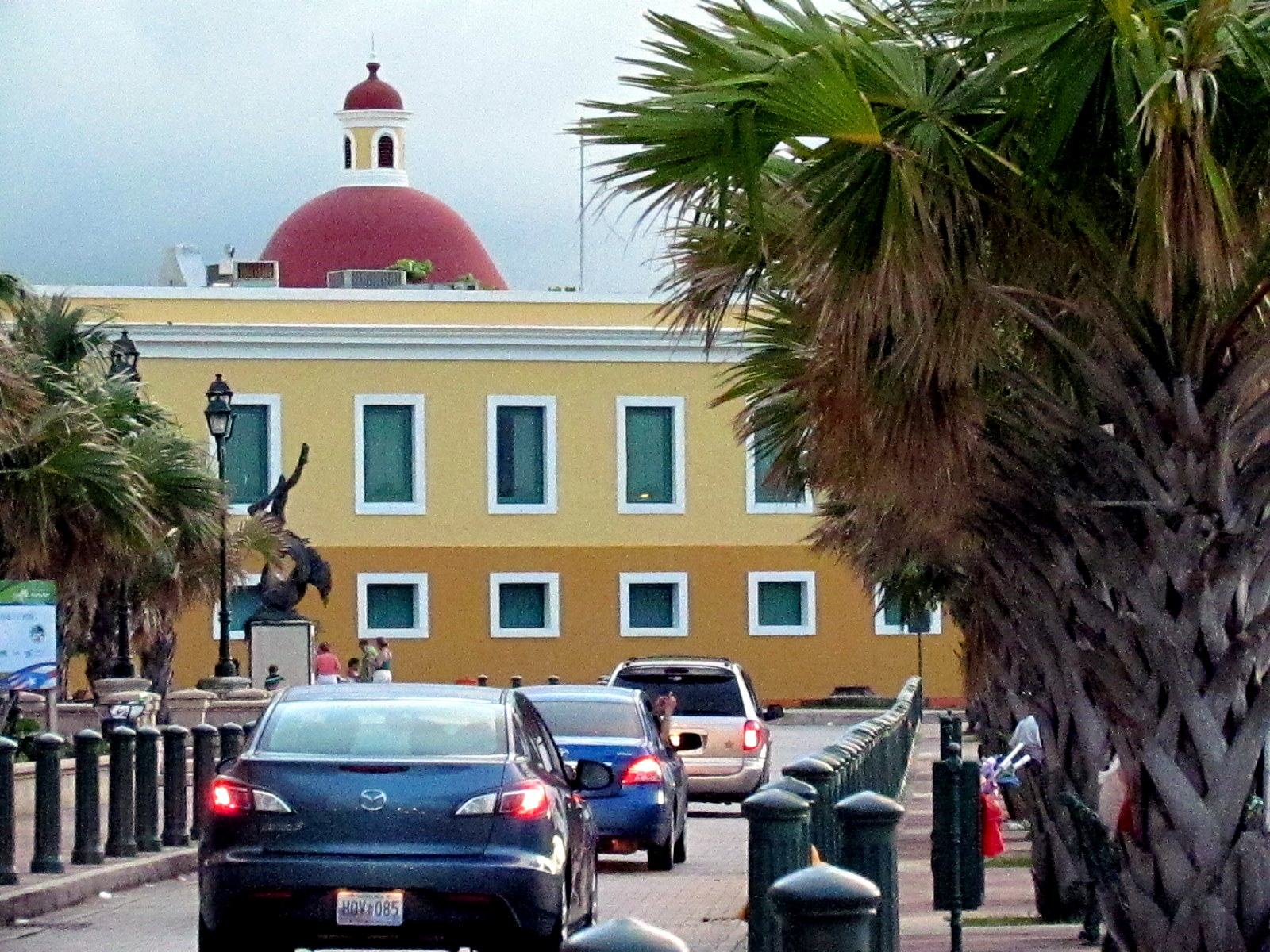
