= Taller Boricua =

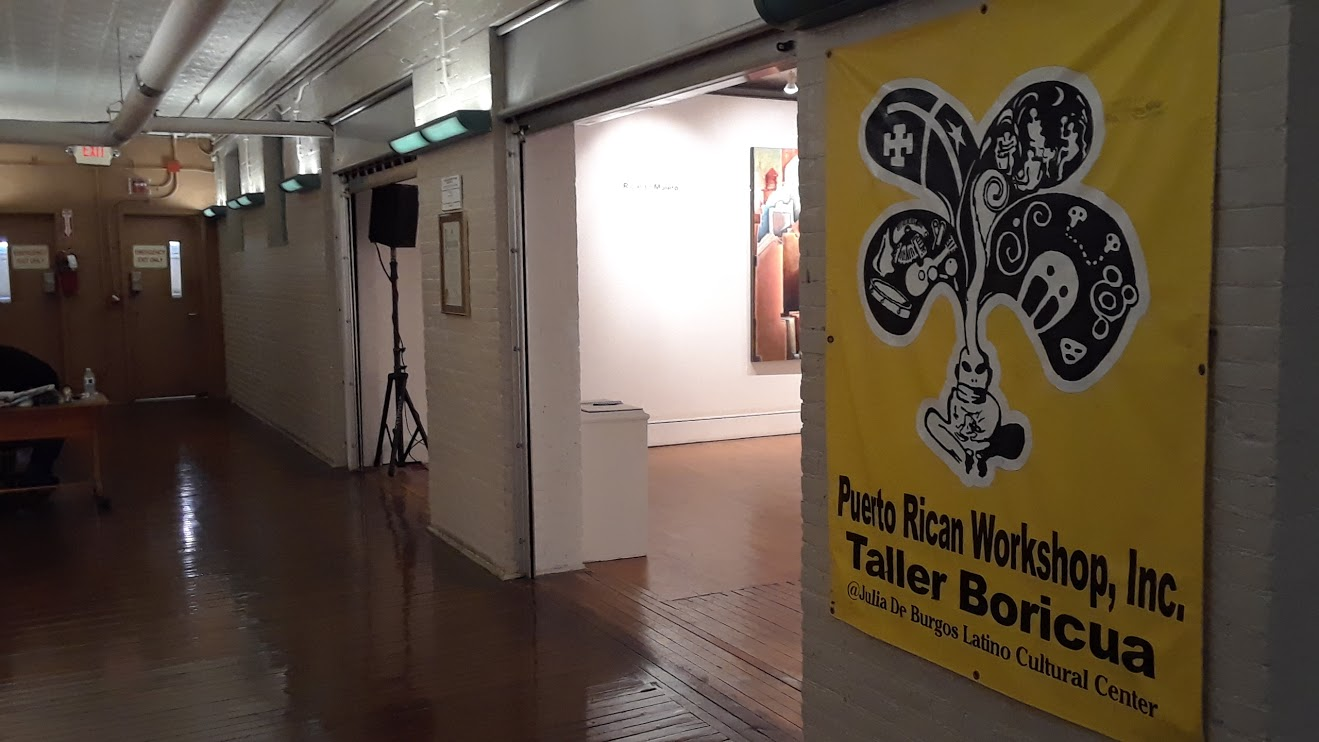
- Established: 1969
- Location: 1680 Lexington Ave, New York, NY 10029
- Coordinates: 40°47′31″N 73°56′48.5″W
- Type: Cultural center
- Director: Marcos Dimas
- Website: tallerboricua.org

The Taller Boricua, in Manhattan, New York is a multidisciplinary cultural space founded in 1969 by Puerto Rican artists to promote the arts and culture of the Puerto Rican community in El Barrio/East Harlem, as well as to offer a platform to underrepresented and marginalized artists.

It is located at the Julia de Burgos Latino Cultural Center.

Its founders were a group of activists, intellectuals and young artists such as Carlos Osorio, Rafael Tufino, Fernando Salicrup, Marcos Dimas and Nitza Tufiño.

This artist-run non profit gallery offer art exhibitions, artist talks, workshops and art classes that take place throughout the year and aim to curb the economic, cultural and social disparities in the area.

== Recent developments ==
In Fall, 2019, a twelve-venue exhibition between Taller Boricua, Boricua College Art Gallery, Lehman College Art Gallery, Longwood Art Gallery, Queens College Art Center, Studio 13 Gallery, Chashama Space for Artists (two locations), Teatro LaTea, Queensborough College Art Gallery, East Village Art View and BronxArtSpace opened, featuring dozens of Latin American artists. The 2019 Latin American Art Triennial was organized by Alexis Mendoza, New York Latin American Art Triennial Chief Curator, and Luis Stephenberg, New York Latin American Art Triennial Director.
