= Rafael Tufiño =

Puerto Rican painter (1922–2008)

- Born: Rafael Tufiño Figueroa; October 30, 1922; Brooklyn, New York City, New York, U.S.
- Died: March 13, 2008 (aged 85); Condado, Puerto Rico
- Education: San Carlos Academy
- Occupations: painter, printmaker
- Awards: Guggenheim Fellow (1954)

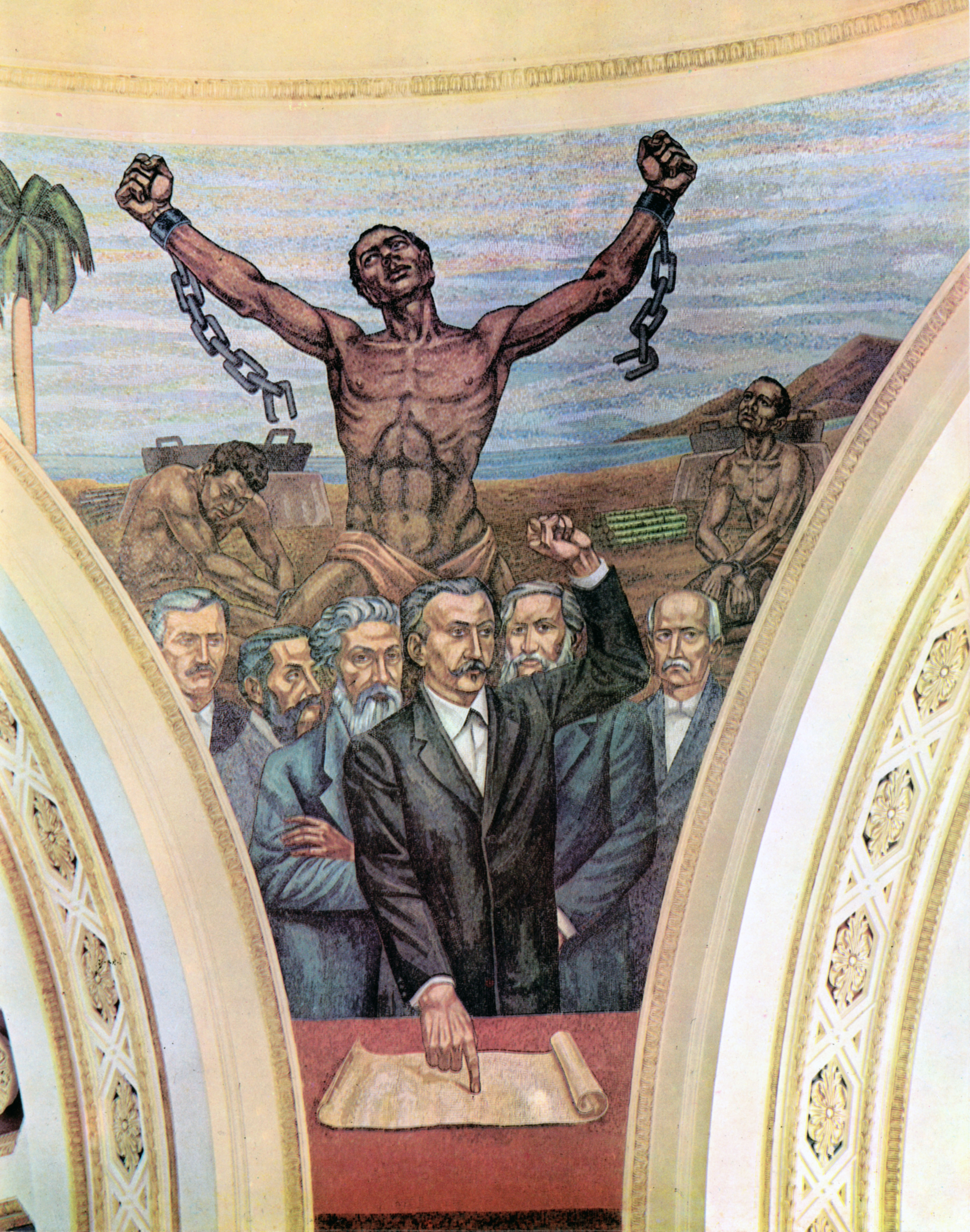
Abolition of Slavery (1986), mosaic by Tufiño in the Capitol Building, San Juan, Puerto Rico

Rafael Tufiño Figueroa (October 30, 1922 – March 13, 2008) was a Puerto Rican painter, printmaker and cultural figure in Puerto Rico, known locally as the "Painter of the People".

== Early life ==
Rafael Tufiño Figueroa was born on October 30, 1922, in Brooklyn, New York where he lived with his parents, Gregoria Figueroa and Agustín Tufiño, until he was ten years old. In 1932, he moved to Puerta de Tierra, the neighborhood located just outside Old San Juan, to live with his grandmother. At the age of 12, he began to work in the workshop of Antonio "Tony" Maldonado, where he painted signs and letters.

Tufiño served in the United States Army from 1943 to 1946. Some of his first documented drawings date from his tenure in Panama while serving with the Army Signal Corps in Panama. After being honorably discharge from the Army he took advantage of the GI Bill, he then moved to Mexico to study painting and engraving at the San Carlos Academy, where he was exposed to the populist ideas of the Taller de Gráfica Popular (Spanish: "People's Graphic Workshop") and the Mexican muralists Diego Rivera and José Clemente Orozco. Upon returning to Puerto Rico in 1949, he joined the Graphic Arts Workshop of the Community Education Division (DIVEDCO, for its Spanish acronym), which had been created as part of a government campaign to teach the public about health.

== Artwork and legacy ==
Rafael Tufiño's painting included portraits, landscapes and images of Puerto Rico daily life. During the 1950s, he was part of the "Generación de los Cincuentas" (the Generation of the Fifties), a group of artists who worked to create a new artistic style and aesthetic identity for Puerto Rico.

He also spent time in New York on a Guggenheim fellowship in 1954, and returned to the city in the 1960s, when he encountered a generation of Puerto Rican artists particularly intent on exploring and celebrating their cultural heritage.

Until 1963, he contributed to the Puerto Rico Department of Public Instruction (now the Department of Education) various paintings, posters, and advertisements to help bring government-sponsored literacy and hygiene programs to poor and illiterate communities in Puerto Rico.

Tufiño dedicated his later life to foster art and related studies in Puerto Rican communities, such as taking part in founding an artist workshop / cooperative named Taller Boricua in 1970, located in Spanish Harlem, and advocating for the creation of El Museo del Barrio, located on New York's Fifth Avenue at the top of "Museum Mile".

For his body of work and his dedication towards minority communities, he received a lifetime achievement award by the National Arts Club in New York City in 2003.

== Personal life ==
Rafael Tufiño had two daughters, Nitza Tufiño and Rima Tufiño, and three sons, Rafael Tufiño II, Salvatore Tufiño, and Pablo Tufiño, as well as eight grandchildren.

== Death and legacy ==
Tufiño died on March 13, 2008, in Condado, Puerto Rico at the age of 85 after suffering from lung cancer. Upon hearing his death, the Governor of Puerto Rico ordered all state flags to fly at half mast and proclaimed 2 days of national mourning.

His work is among the collections of the Museum of Modern Art, the Metropolitan Museum of Art, Philadelphia Museum of Art, the Galería Nacional, and the Museum of Art of Puerto Rico.

== See also ==
- List of Puerto Ricans
