= El Museo del Barrio =

Museum in Manhattan, New York

Coordinates: 40.793068°N 73.951378°W

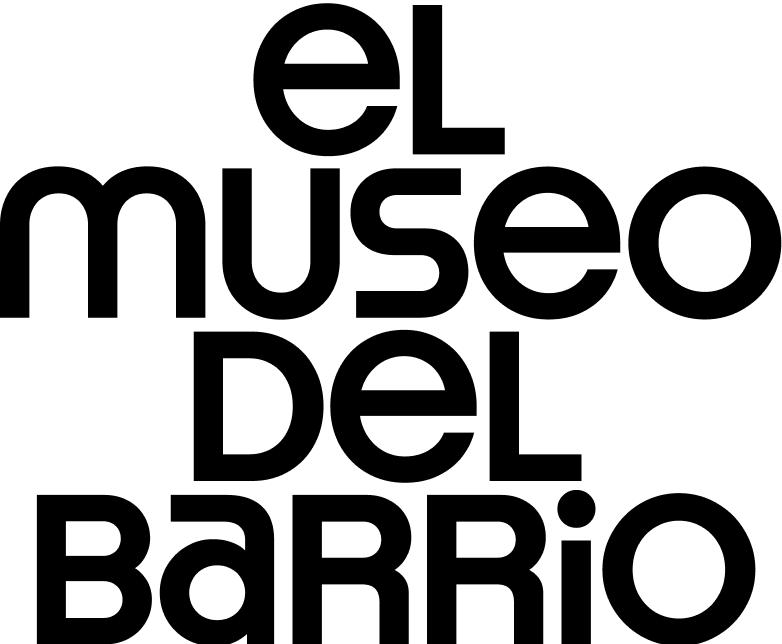

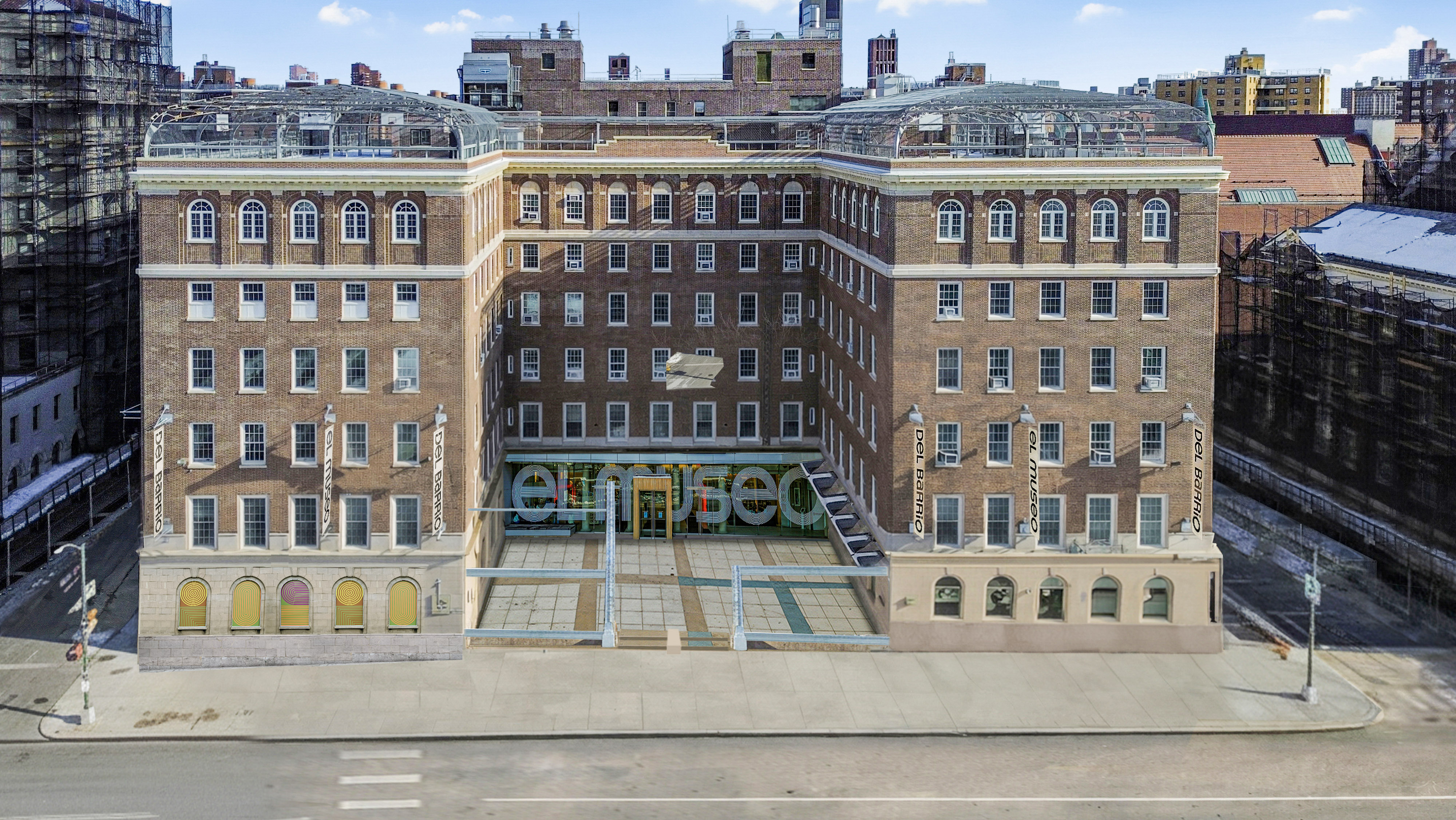
- Established: 1969
- Location: 1230 Fifth Avenue, Upper Manhattan, New York, NY
- Type: Art, Cultural
- Director: Patrick Charpenel (2017 - Present)
- Public transit access: Subway: at 103rd Street at 110th Street; Bus: M3, M4, M102, M116
- Website: elmuseo.org

El Museo del Barrio, often known simply as El Museo (the museum), is a museum at 1230 Fifth Avenue in Upper Manhattan, New York City. It is located near the northern end of Fifth Avenue's Museum Mile, immediately north of the Museum of the City of New York. Founded in 1969, El Museo specializes in Latin American and Caribbean art, with an emphasis on works from Puerto Rico and the Puerto Rican community in New York City. It is the oldest museum of the country dedicated to Latino art.

== Collection ==
The museum features an extensive permanent collection of over 6,500 pieces, and it encompasses more than 800 years of Puerto Rican, Latin American, Caribbean, and Latino art, includes pre-Columbian Taíno artifacts, traditional arts (such as Puerto Rican Santos de palo and Vejigante masks), twentieth-century drawings, paintings, sculptures and installations, as well as prints, photography, documentary films, and video. There are often temporary exhibits on Puerto Rican and Latino modern art. The museum also sponsors numerous festivals and educational programs throughout the year including the annual Three Kings Day parade. Due to a lack of space prior to their 2009-2010 expansion, the museum began to place some of their permanent collection online. This also served as a means of audience development.

Seeking to increase their audience and reach new audiences, El Museo has partnered with a number of organizations for joint exhibits including Nueva York (New York Historical Society) and Caribbean Crossroads (Queens Museum of Art and the Studio Museum in Harlem). Also, the museum is currently working on building its permanent collection by developing their holdings on Post-War art, adding more Modernist and Contemporary works, and fostering the strengths of graphics and Taíno holdings.

== History ==
Originally, the museum was a fire station during the Nuyorican Movement and Civil Rights Movement, where books were burned by radical political figures. Spurred by concerns over a lack of cultural diversity in city educational programs and educational opportunities in the barrio, a group of African-American and Puerto Rican parents, educators and community activists in Central and East Harlem, also known as El Barrio, demanded for their kids to receive education that acknowledged and addressed their diverse and cultural heritages. In response to these demands, William W. Frey, the superintendent of school district 4, appointed artist/educator Rafael Montañez Ortíz to create materials for schools in East and Central Harlem that would highlight Puerto Rican art, history, folklore and culture. However, Ortíz quickly redeveloped this project as the creation of a community museum that would be dedicated to Puerto Rican art and culture, and named it El Museo del Barrio.

In its founding documents, Ortíz stated that "The cultural disenfranchisement I experience as a Puerto Rican has prompted me to seek a practical alternative to the orthodox museum, which fails to meet my needs for an authentic ethnic experience. To afford me and others the opportunity to establish living connections with our own culture, I founded El Museo del Barrio." He served as director of the institution from June 1969 to Spring 1971. The museum also sought to define itself as an educational institution and its original location was a public school classroom. Puerto Ricans continue to make up the majority of New York City's Latino population, which is growing. As a result of the museum's expansion, some artists, academics, and community activists who want to keep the museum true to its original purpose have grown frustrated.

In 1977, El Museo joined the Cultural Institutions Group (also known as CIGs) which helped increase and maintain its funding. Its funding was frozen in the 1980s following a period of mismanagement. However it was able to successfully rebound and grow. A Frida Kahlo exhibit in 2002 brought more attendees than normally visited the museum annually and helped to transform its perception and led to the museum's first non-Puerto Rican Director.

In 2009, El Museo celebrated its fortieth anniversary with public events, and the completion of an extensive renovation, which included an exhibition space for its permanent collection, a cafe, and a redesigned 4,500-square-foot courtyard.

El Museo has grown from an alternative space to an established museum in East Harlem and has broadened its focus from exclusively Puerto Rican art, to encompass Latino, Caribbean, and Latin American art and culture.

In 2015, El Museo recognized the gender gap in exclusion of women from museum exhibitions and committed to organizing a retrospective or major survey of works by a woman artist annually which would occupy the majority of the space in the museum and include public programming, publications and scholarship. The first such exhibit was dedicated to the work of Gloria Rodriguez Calero.

=== Controversy ===
On the 25th anniversary of the 9/11 terrorist attacks in New York and elsewhere, the museum rented its space to a conference of conspiracy theorists.

== Location ==
From El Museo's origins in a public school classroom, it has called a number of different locations home. Between 1969 and 1976, it operated out of a number of different storefronts on Third and Lexington Avenues in the nexus of the community they served. In 1977, they moved to their permanent home, the neo-classical Heckscher Building (this is the building that was The Heckscher Foundation for Children and not the Heckscher Building n/k/a the Crown Building) on Fifth Avenue and became a founding member of Museum Mile when it launched in 1978. This location contributed to the museum's growth and audience development, increasing the market share of non Latino visitors to 40% of their audience.

Música de Cámara, located nearby is a non-profit for promoting Latin classical musicians and was launched at the museum by Eva de la O, in 1979.

== Expansion ==
In the early 2000s the museum experienced a significant increase in visitors, however remained confined to one floor in its building, which it shares with a school and a number of private organizations. A plan was proposed for the Museum of the City of New York, across the street from El Museo, to relocate to the historic Tweed Courthouse by City Hall in Lower Manhattan. El Museo would then have moved into the other museum's former building, dramatically expanding its available exhibition space. However, Mayor Michael Bloomberg decided to site the new New York City Department of Education in the Tweed Courthouse instead.

After the failed relocation, El Museo opted to pursue a $15 million project to transform its outdoor courtyard into an open glass lobby, café and performance space, and to provide a suitable public "face" to the street on the model of the renovated Brooklyn Museum. It reopened in October 2009 to mostly positive reviews. The renovation was spearheaded by local architect Gruzen Samton and completed at a cost of $35 million and added a shop and restaurant.

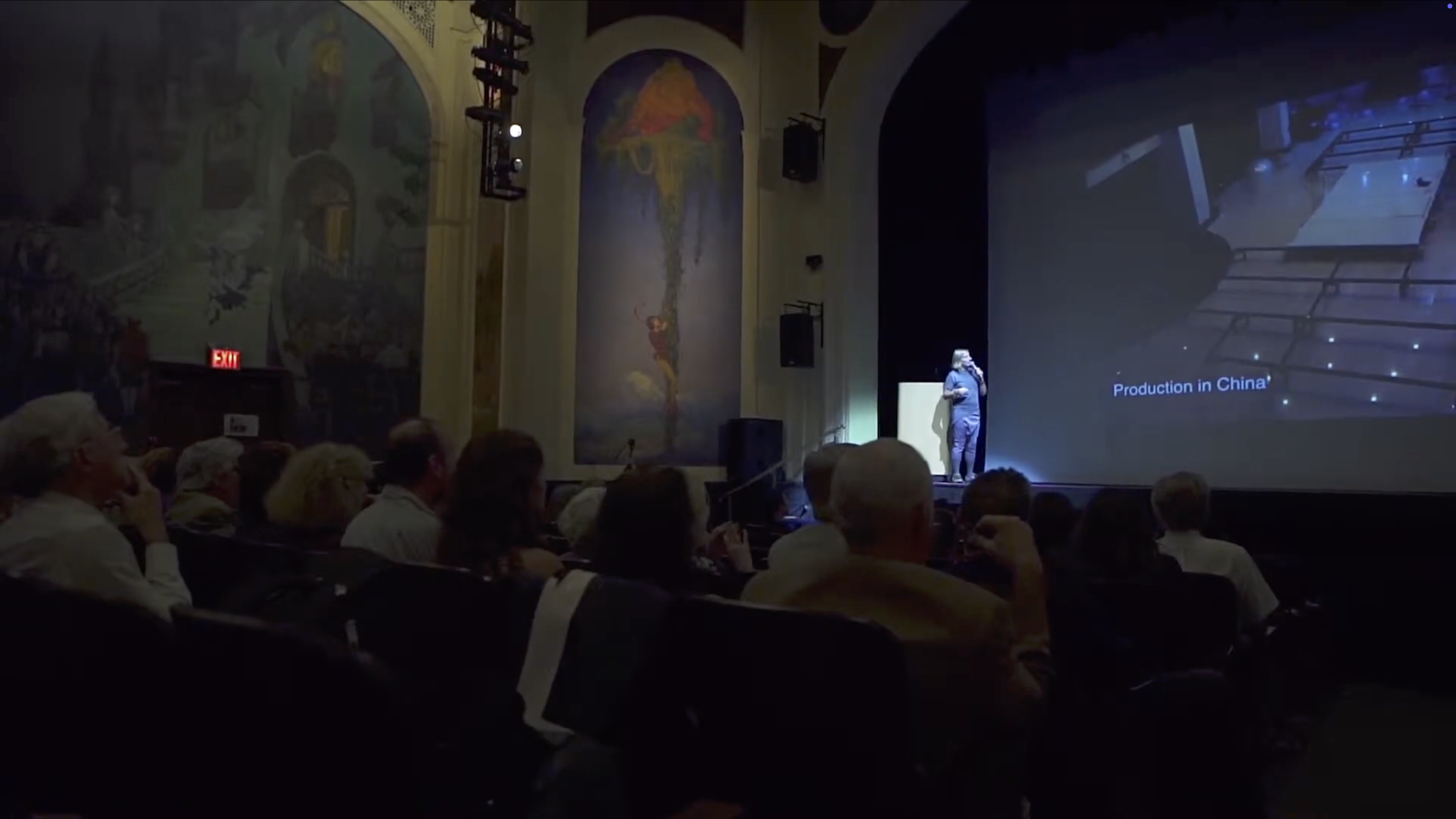
The El Teatro, with Grimanesa Amorós on stage.

From 2018 to 2019, the Teatro, theater was restored. Its fairytale paintings were redone, the seats exchanged, and the stage modernized. Two forgotten artistic chandeliers were hung from the ceiling again and the refurbishments and re-opening were celebrated with a concert by legend and El Barrio native Eddie Palmieri, on February 20, 2021.

== Management ==
On February 15, 2013, it was announced that Margarita Aguilar left her post as the director. Jorge Daniel Veneciano, the following director stepped down from the position in August 2016. In 2017, Patrick Charpenel became the museum's executive director. He has worked extensively in Mexico as well as internationally.

== See also ==
- List of museums and cultural institutions in New York City
- Education in New York City
