= Museum of Art of Puerto Rico =

Art museum in Santurce, San Juan, Puerto Rico

Museo de Arte de Puerto Rico
- Museo de Arte de Puerto Rico
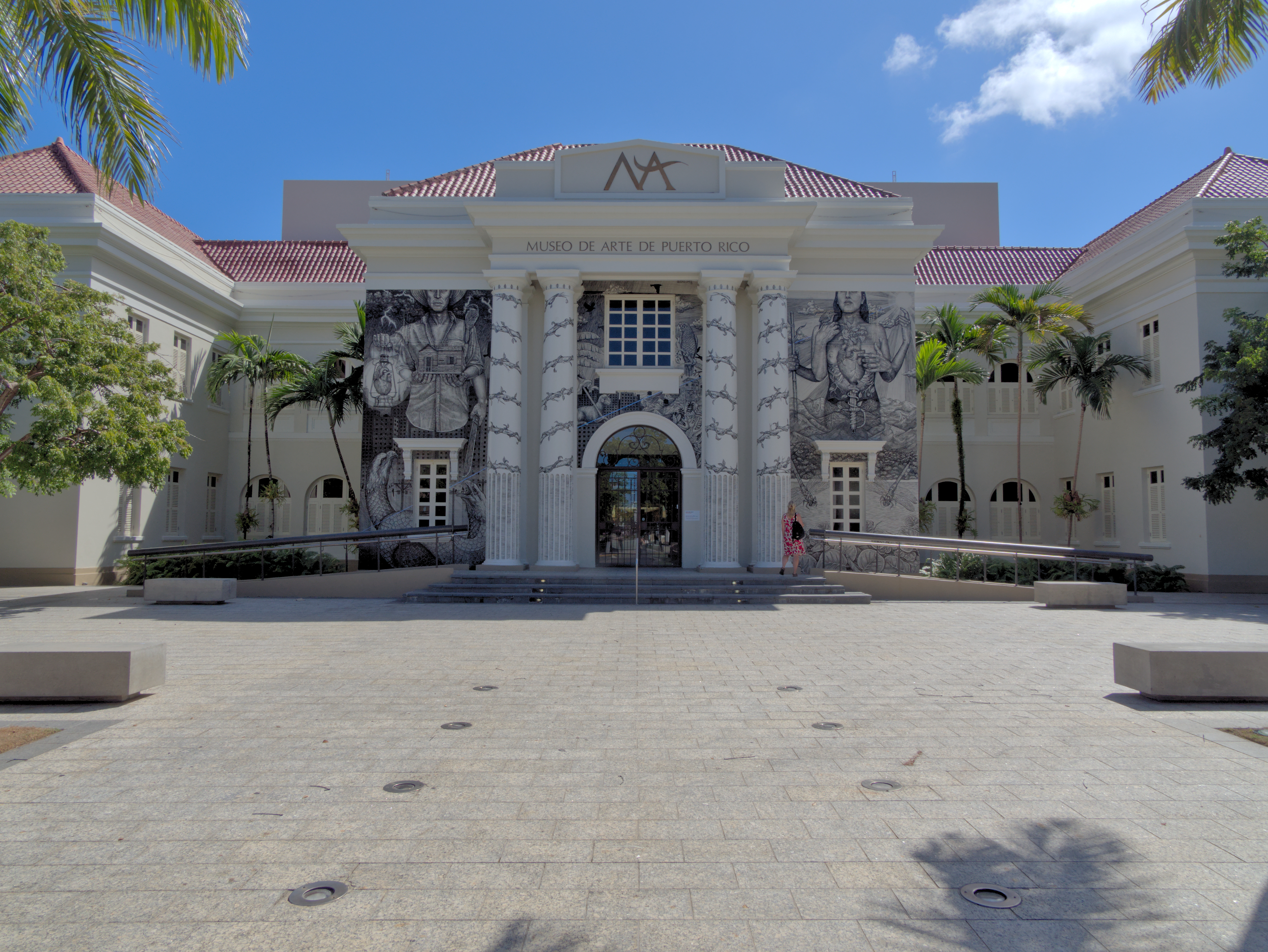
- Museum of Art in Santurce, San Juan
- Interactive fullscreen map
- Established: July 1, 2000
- Location: Santurce, San Juan, Puerto Rico
- Coordinates: 18°26′54″N 66°03′58″W
- Website: mapr.org

The Museum of Art of Puerto Rico (Spanish: Museo de Arte de Puerto Rico, abbreviated MAPR) is an art museum in Santurce, a barrio of San Juan, Puerto Rico, with 18 exhibition halls. The museum is located in a historic building, formerly occupied by the San Juan Municipal Hospital.

== History ==
The museum building, designed by architect William H. Shimmelphening and built in 1920, is the remaining building in the former ruined complex of the San Juan Municipal Hospital. The building served as a hospital until 1966 when most of its body was moved to the newly inaugurated Centro Médico de Río Piedras (Río Piedras Medical Center). Afterwards, it served as office space for the Puerto Rico Department of Transportation and Public Works until 1975.

The idea behind the Puerto Rico Museum of Art dates to 1995, when the Puerto Rico Tourism Company (Spanish: Compañía de Turismo de Puerto Rico) with funding by the Government Development Bank for Puerto Rico (Banco Gubernamental de Fomento, BGF). Instead of demolishing the building, the old structure was incorporated into the new museum building.

== Permanent collection ==
The permanent collection of the Museum of Art of Puerto Rico is divided into 24 galleries located on the third and fourth levels of the museum building.

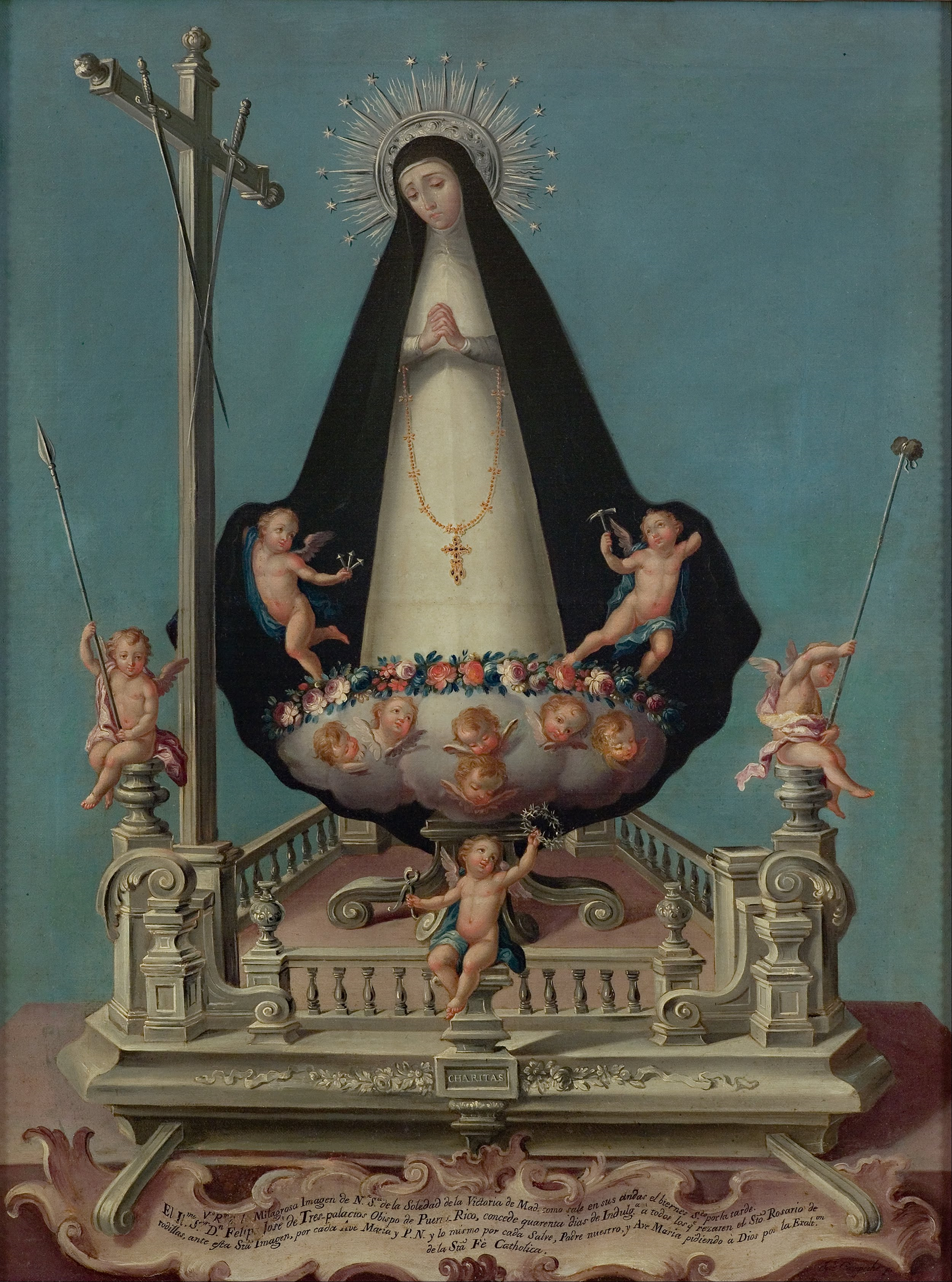
Virgen de la Soledad de la Victoria, José Campeche (1782–89)

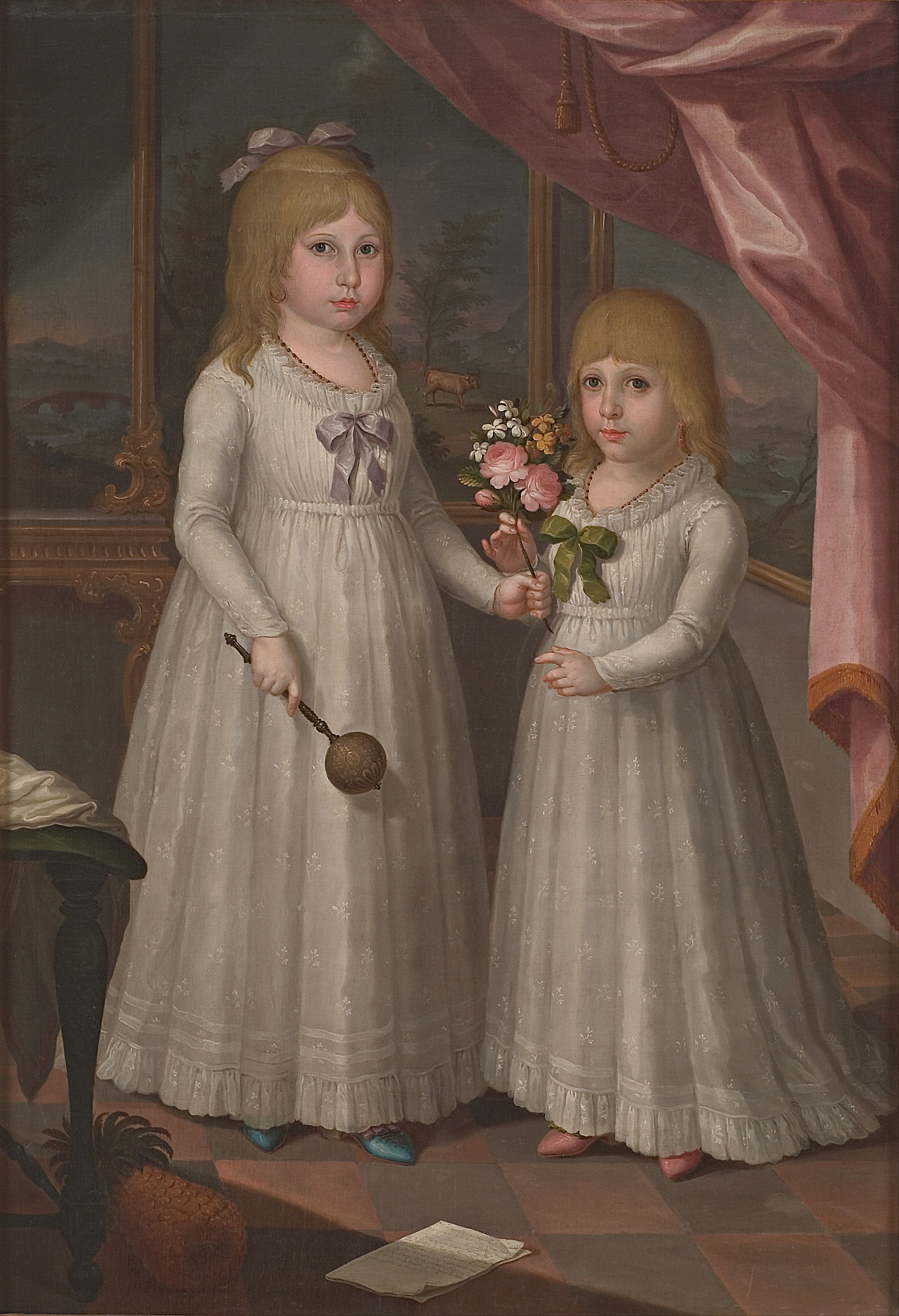
The Daughters of Governor Ramón de Castro, José Campeche (1797)

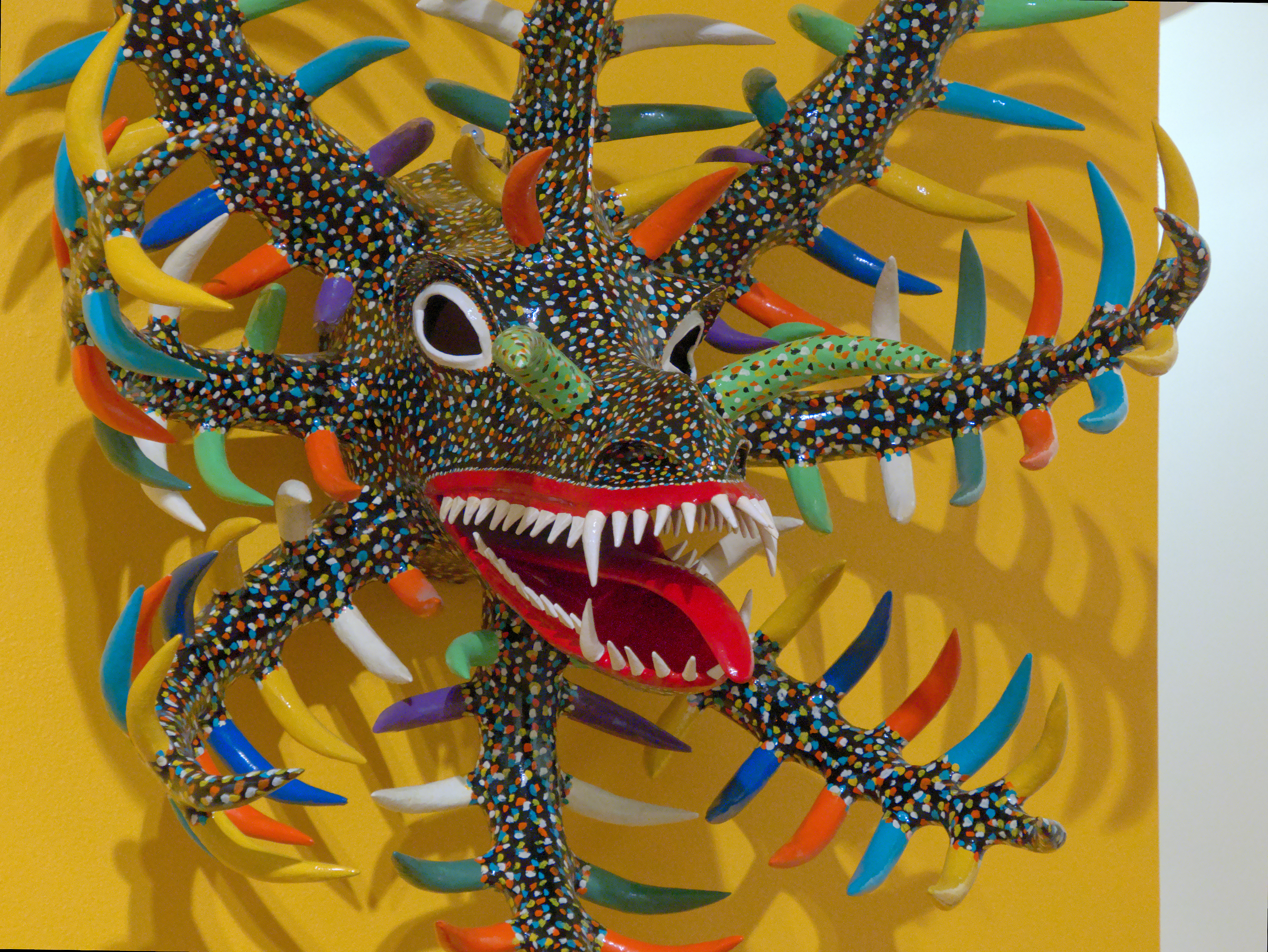
Vejigante mask (2019)

== Programs and Events ==
On 28 and 29 August 2026, the museum hosted a two-day program designed to train new Wikipedia editors and augment coverage of Puerto Rican history, art, and culture on the encyclopedia. The events were sponsored by WikimediaNYC and part of its Wikicurious series, which is a Wikipedia editing training series for beginners that is funded by Craig Newmark Philanthropies.

== Gallery ==
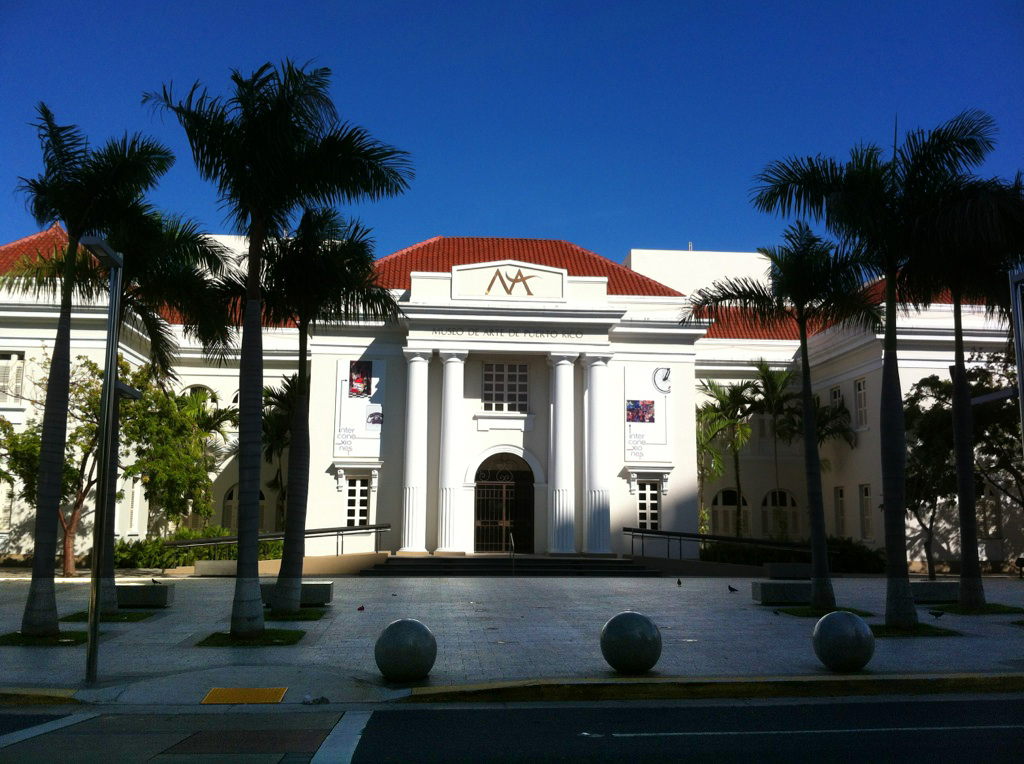

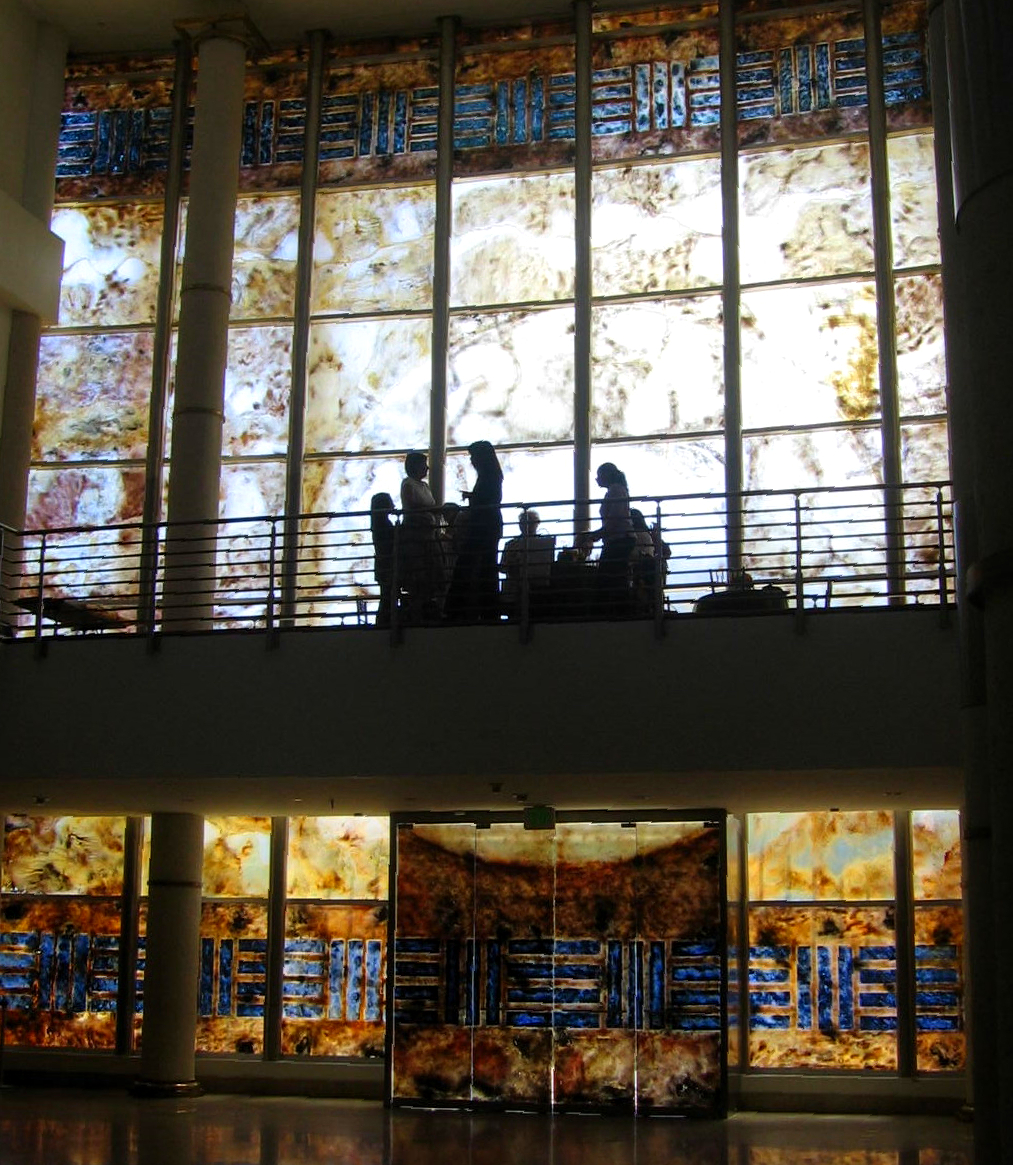

== See also ==
- Graphopoli
