= The School of the Teacher Rafael Cordero =

Painting by Francisco Oller

La escuela del maestro Rafael Cordero
- The School of the Teacher Rafael Cordero (English)
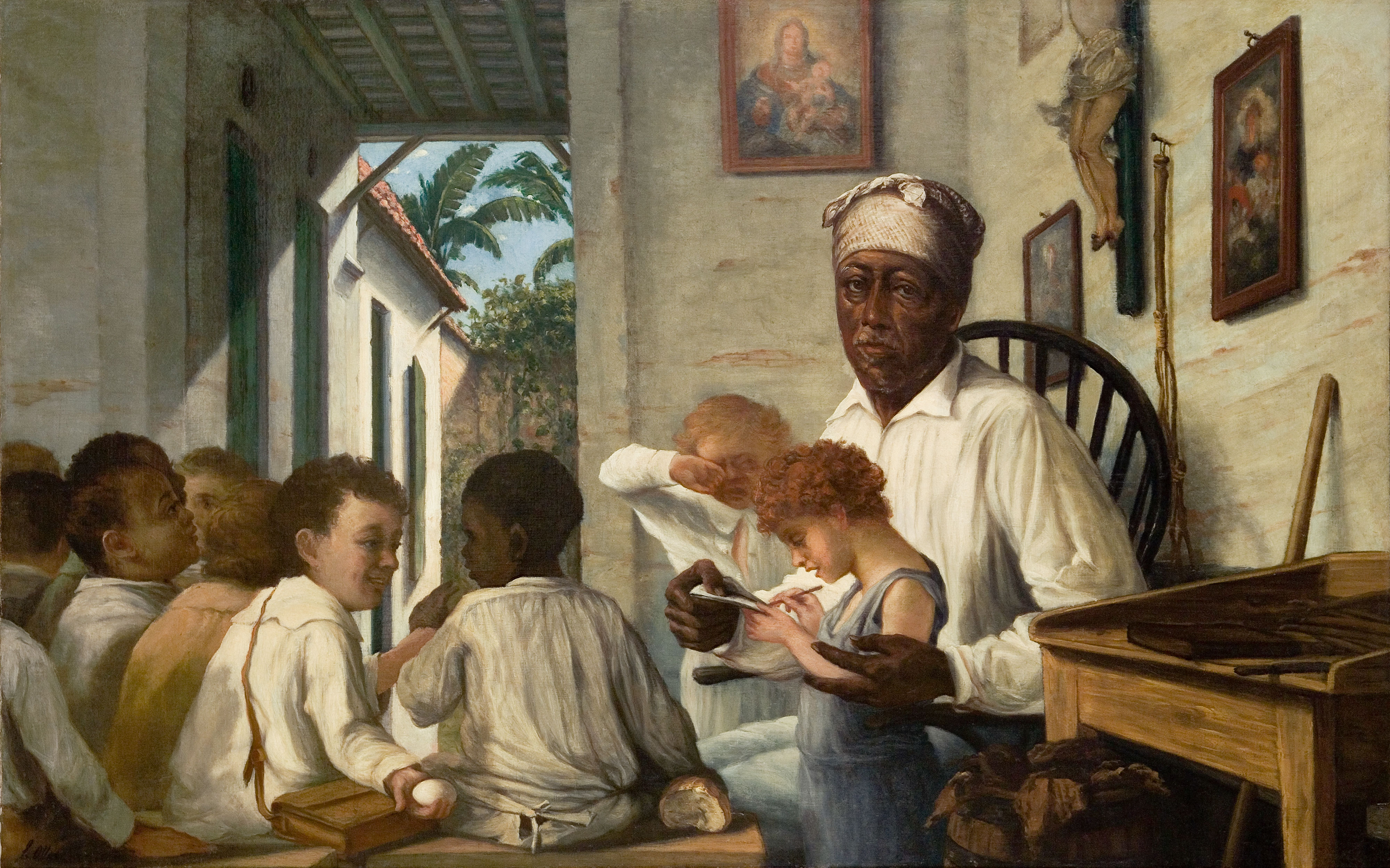
- Artist: Francisco Oller
- Year: c. 1890
- Subject: Rafael Cordero y Molina
- Dimensions: 260 cm × 410 cm (103 in × 160 in)
- Location: Ateneo Puertorriqueño, San Juan

The School of the Teacher Rafael Cordero (Spanish: La escuela del maestro Rafael Cordero) is an oil painting by Puerto Rican Impressionist Francisco Oller depicting Rafael Cordero y Molina, the father of public education in Puerto Rico. The painting, today considered an important work of art in both the artistic canon and popular culture of Puerto Rico, forms part of the art collection of the Puerto Rican Athenaeum.

== Subject ==
The painting is an example of Puerto Rican social realism of the late 19th century. It depicts a former rustic tobacco workshop-turned house school of Rafael Cordero located at Luna Street in Old San Juan at some point in the mid-19th century. The teacher, Rafael Cordero, holds a direct gaze at the viewer, while the students energetically engage amongst themselves. While the scene is visually realistic, it holds several allegorical symbols used as direct references to the biography of Rafael Cordero: the tobacco-spinning table symbolizes Cordero's familiar origins in the tobacco industry (and the economic source to sustain the school), the crucifix and religious portraits on the walls reference his Catholic devotion and spirituality, and the tropical greenery and sunny lights outside reminds the viewer of the social and geographic reality of Puerto Rico beyond the urban Spanish colonial context of San Juan. The student body not only represents the racial and social diversity of Puerto Rico, but the integration of women into the predominantly male society of Puerto Rico, as seen in the boy and the girl next to Rafael Cordero, and of the racial integration between Puerto Ricans of European and African ancestry, as seen in the direct exchange between the two children near the center of the painting. Three of the students are also meant to directly portray former pupils of Cordero who grew up to become founding members of the Puerto Rican Athenaeum: José Julián Acosta, Alejandro Tapia y Rivera and Manuel Izaburu Vizcarrondo.

=== Rafael Cordero ===
Rafael Cordero y Molina was a self-educated Afro-Puerto Rican educator who, along with his sister Celestina, established the first free-access schools in Puerto Rico open to everyone regardless of race, gender or social status. Born on October 24, 1790 in San Juan to freed slaves and tobacco plantation workers Lucas Cordero and Rita Molina, Rafael Cordero, was very interested in literature, education and the Catholic religion from an early age. Throughout his career he came to educate prominent figures in the history of Puerto Rico such as José Julián Acosta, Francisco del Valle Atiles, Román Baldorioty de Castro, Lorenzo Puentes Acosta and Alejandro Tapia y Rivera, figures associated with social movements like the abolition of slavery, women's suffrage and Puerto Rican self-determination. He died in 1868 and today he is recognized for his success in advancing the development of education and literacy in Puerto Rico, and also for advocating for the abolition of slavery and for the promotion of racial and socioeconomic integration to Puerto Rican society. Cordero was recognized as venerable by Pope Francis in 2013, and the process for his beatification has been ongoing since 2004.

== History ==
Francisco Oller began working on La escuela del maestro Rafael Cordero while living in France in 1890, before his permanent return to Puerto Rico in 1895. Oller was very interested in portraying a realistic image at the time rather than that of the aristocracy and local authority. He was inspired by the story of the artistic and professional formation of Puerto Rican Athenaeum founders José Julián Acosta, Alejandro Tapia y Rivera and Manuel Izaburu Vizcarrondo, who had studied under Rafael Cordero. Since Cordero had died more than twenty years prior to the painting, Oller used a newspaper image of him as a model for the portrait. Oller officially dedicated the painting to its subject in 1890, on the 100th anniversary of his birth. The portrait would not be completely finished until at least 1891, when it was officially unveiled at the Athenaeum.

== Legacy ==
Along with El Velorio, La escuela del maestro Rafael Cordero is one of the most widely recognizable works of Francisco Oller not only in the Puerto Rican arts but in the artistic canon of the Caribbean and Latin America. Beyond the context of the arts, the portrait has immortalized the face of Rafael Cordero in Puerto Rican history and culture, giving the important historical figure a visual representation in the cultural psyche of Puerto Rico.

The painting today forms part of the Puerto Rican Athenaeum collection but it has been exhibited in institutions such as the Brooklyn Museum (between 2015 and 2016).

== See also ==
- Puerto Rican art
- Education in Puerto Rico
