= Ateneo Puertorriqueño =

Cultural institution in Puerto Rico founded in 1876

Coordinates: 18°27′51″N 66°6′31″W

Puerto Rican Athenaeum Ateneo Puertorriqueño
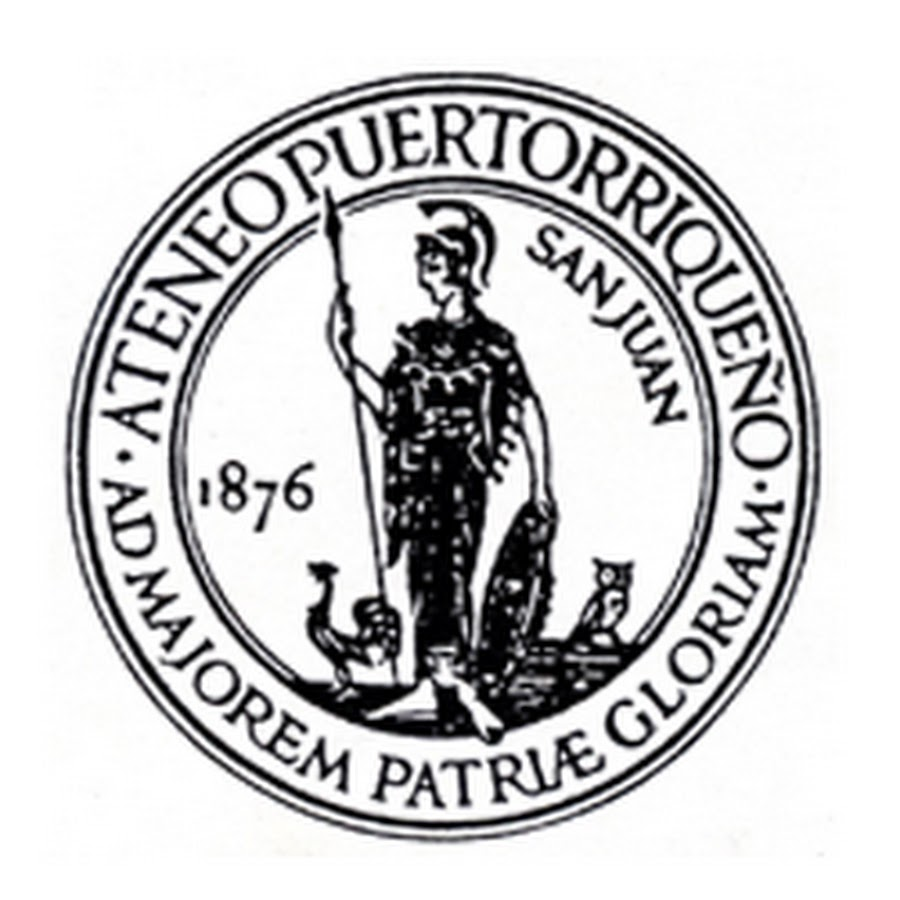
- Ateneo Puertorriqueño
- Nickname: "El Ateneo" (English: "The Athenaeum")
- Named after: Athenaeum
- Founded: 30 April 1876; 150 years ago
- Founders: Manuel de Elzaburu y Vizcarrondo, José Julián Acosta, Alejandro Tapia y Rivera, and Francisco de Paula Acuña y Paniagua
- Founded at: San Juan City Hall
- Type: Not-for-profit cultural institution
- Registration no.: 352044
- Headquarters: Puerta de Tierra, Old San Juan, San Juan, Puerto Rico
- Location: San Juan, Puerto Rico
- Region served: Puerto Rico
- Official language: Spanish
- Board of directors: Junta de Gobierno del Ateneo Puertorriqueño
- Endowment: $466,636.00 (2018)
- Website: ateneopr.org

Puerto Rican Athenaeum Ateneo Puertorriqueño
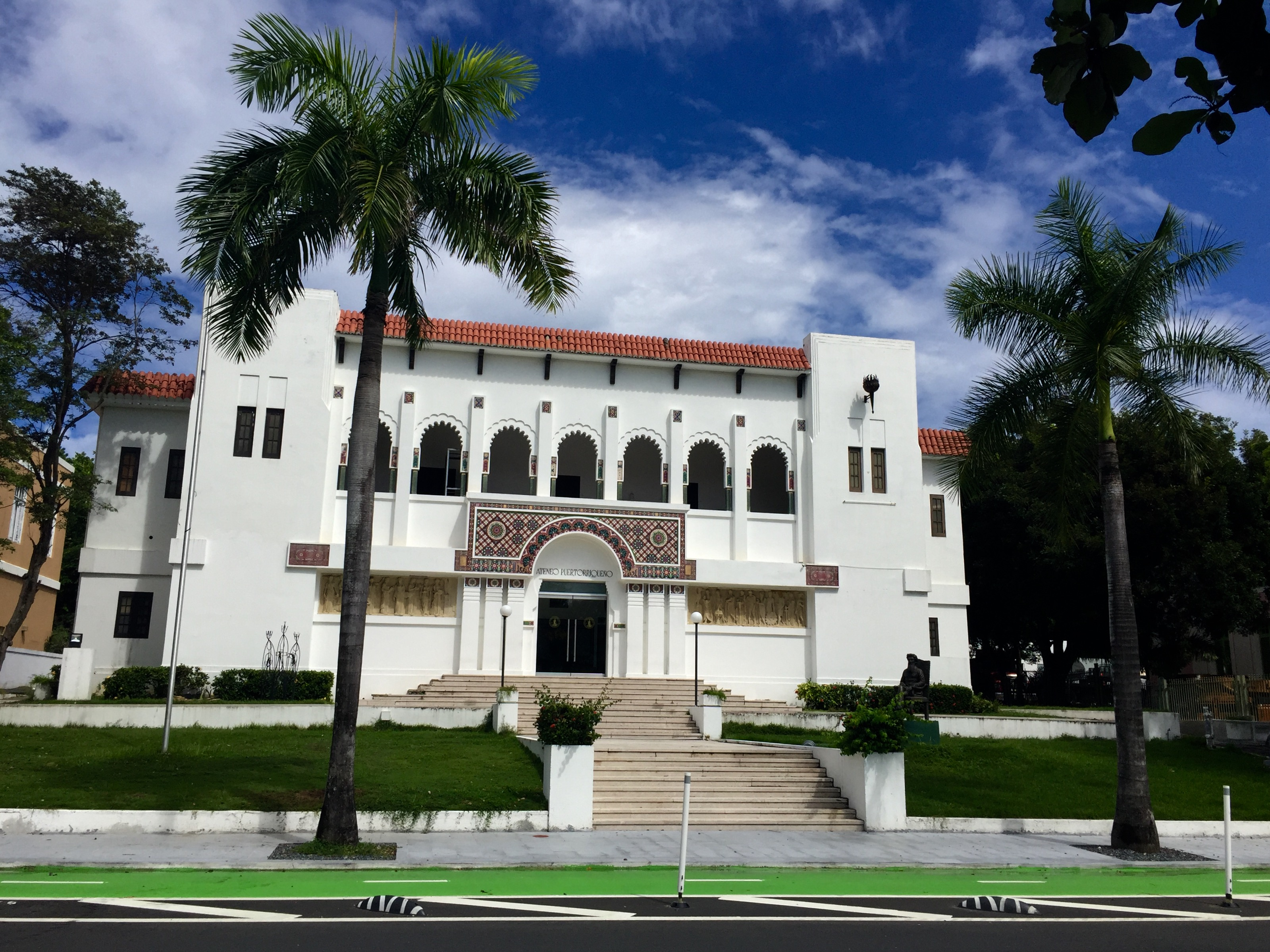

General information
- Architectural style: Spanish Morisco
- Groundbreaking: 27 May 1923; 103 years ago

Technical details
- Floor count: 2

Design and construction
- Architect: Francisco Roldán Arce

Other information
- Parking: 14 (Disabled: 1)
- Ateneo Puertorriqueño
- U.S. Historic district – Contributing property
- Part of: Puerta de Tierra Historic District (ID100002936)
- Designated CP: October 15, 2019

The Ateneo Puertorriqueño (Puerto Rican Athenaeum) is a cultural institution in Puerto Rico. Founded on April 30, 1876, it has been called Puerto Rico's oldest cultural institution, however, it is actually its third oldest overall and second culturally, after the Bar Association of Puerto Rico, and the Casino of Mayagüez.

One of its founders was the playwright, Alejandro Tapia y Rivera. The Athenaeum was the first cultural institution in the island to give accolades and awards to artists and writers such as José Gautier Benítez, José de Diego, Manuel María Sama, Francisco Oller, Manuel Fernández Juncos, Lola Rodríguez de Tió and Luis Lloréns Torres.

The Athenaeum today serves as a museum, school, library, and performance hall for the arts in Puerto Rico. It hosts a number of contests, conferences, and exhibits each year, presenting Puerto Rican art, literature, and music. Since 1937 the use of the spaces of the Athenaeum has been limited to activities it sponsors. Its headquarters are located in Puerta de Tierra, near Old San Juan, in a monumental strip that also houses the Casa de España, the Carnegie Library, the Capitol complex and the Puerto Rico Olympic Committee headquarters.

== History ==
The Athenaeum was founded on Sunday, April 30, 1876 at San Juan City Hall. One of its founders was the playwright Alejandro Tapia y Rivera. The Athenaeum was the first to give accolades and awards to artists and writers such as José Gautier Benítez, José de Diego, Manuel María Sama, Francisco Oller, Manuel Fernández Juncos, Lola Rodríguez de Tió and Luis Lloréns Torres.

Nilita Vientós Gastón became its first female president in 1946 and was the incumbent until 1961. In 1976 the Athenaeum celebrated its centennial with Eladio Rodríguez Otero at the helm as president, who gave a speech in presence of the then governor Rafael Hernández Colón, Hiram Torres Rigual, in representation of the Supreme Court of Puerto Rico, and former governor Luis A. Ferré. To commemorate the event, the Athenaeum also commissioned a medal to be awarded to those who represent "the highest national values expressed through [Puerto Rican] culture." The Centennial Medal of the Puerto Rican Athenaeum was most recently awarded to the musical salsa group El Gran Combo.

== The Athenaeum Building ==
In 1922 the Aguadillan architect, Francisco Roldán Arce was asked to draw up plans for the present building. The cornerstone was laid on 27 May 1923 in the presence of José Coll y Cuchi. The architecture of the building, Spanish Morisco, was introduced to Puerto Rico by Pedro de Castro, who also built some of the structures that neighbor close by. De Castro's tropical and Mediterranean conscience objected to the architecture imported from the north, giving preference to the luminosity of the Caribbean, to the visual continuity of the spaces, to the galleries and balconies that served as a transition between interior and exterior spaces, shaped by the urban environment, the countryside or the inner courtyards.

== The Athenaeum Art Gallery ==
The Athenaeum's pride is its gallery of art, which consists of 459 artworks. Among the artworks held at the Atheneum one of its most recognizable is Francisco Oller's 1890 painting "La Escuela del Maestro Rafael Cordero".

== Membership ==
The membership of the Athenaeum is divided between four classes:

- Founders-48 inscribed before the inauguration of the institution.
- Of Merit-Those who gave services to the Athenaeum.
- Of Number
- Accidentals-Those who pay their monthly dues.

== Faculty ==
The Puerto Rican Atheneum names members of Puerto Rico's cultural community to endowed chairs which cover a broad spectrum.

=== Experimental Theatre of the Athenaeum ===
The Athenaeum commenced its work with theater under the auspices of Alejandro Tapia y Rivera and took course with the contests it has held since 1911. Emilio S. Belaval founded the first professional theater groups in 1938. The Experimental Theatre of the Puerto Rican Athenaeum was founded in 1952 as the first incumbent company of the institution. As such, one of the greatest Puerto Rican playwrights of the twentieth century, René Marqués, commences a dissemination and creative project of drama that continues to this day, totaling over 500 productions and 26 Avant-Garde Theatre Festivals.

Many participants of the Festivals are members of Puerto Rico's thespian community. The Experimental Theatre Hall, which has capacity for 200, has been the premiere of many works that are now considered classical Puerto Rican drama. The most well-known of these is René Marqués' La Carreta, which premiered in 1953 under the patronage of the Athenaeum. Other dramatists of note whose work has also premiered have been Manuel Méndez Ballester, Francisco Arriví, Luis Rafael Sánchez and Myrna Casa.

==== Theatre Festivals ====
Started in the 1970s, the Theatre Festivals of the Puerto Rican Athenaeum with the intent of showcasing new works, both Puerto Rican, as well as of foreign extraction. Between 1973 and 2003 there were 36 editions of the Theatre Festival. During each edition approximately 10 productions were presented, except in the XIX Edition, where twenty works took place, of which fifteen young authors or Puerto Rican authors of note, and the XX edition, which premiered 26 plays.

=== Music Chair ===
The Music Chair was one of the first created in the Twentieth century. It is in charge of the String Quartet of the Athenaeum.

==== Contemporary Puerto Rican Music Festival ====
Started in 2005, it has had eight editions.

=== Cinema and Video Chair ===
Created in 1985, the Cinema and Video Chair is dedicated to the development of the production of film in Puerto Rico. It also encourages the development of plans and infrastructure for the financing of the local cinematographic industry.

To date, it has produced two feature-length films.

== The Torch of Decolonization ==
Sculptor José Buscaglia Guillermety designed and created a sculpture titled La Antorcha de Descolonización (the "Torch of Decolonization" in English). Its purpose being to "leave consigned our right and our interest in a non-colonial political status." It was inaugurated by the then president of the Atheneaum, Eduardo Morales Coll, on the night of 24–25 July 2007 in front of the Athenaeum Building, where it will remain until the United States propitiates the opportunity for Puerto Rico to resolve its problems as a colony. Political, cultural and sports figures participated in the inaugural ceremony. The cauldron has the engraved phrase Fin a la Colonia ("end to the colony" in English).

== Lyings in state at the Athenaeum ==
Many lying in state honors have been held at the Athenaeum:

- Wednesday, 4 March 2015, from 10:00 a.m. till 2:00 p.m. actor Braulio Castillo, the Athenaeum is custodian of the film library and documentation of the actor's career.
- March 2017 from 1:00 p.m. onward actress and writer Brunilda García.
- 7 November 2019 from 10:00 till 2:00 p.m. television host and astrologer Walter Mercado. Governor Wanda Vázquez Garced decreed a one day of mourning.
- During the morning of 3 January 2020 from 9:00 till midday activist author Marisa Rosado of the Hostosian National Independence Movement, famed for her biography of Carlos Albizu Campos, was mourned there.
- 6 March 2020 from 1:00 p.m. till 6:00 p.m. Rafael Cancel Miranda. Maria de Lourdes Santiago summoned female members of the PIP to receive him at the stairs in front.
