= Ramón Frade =

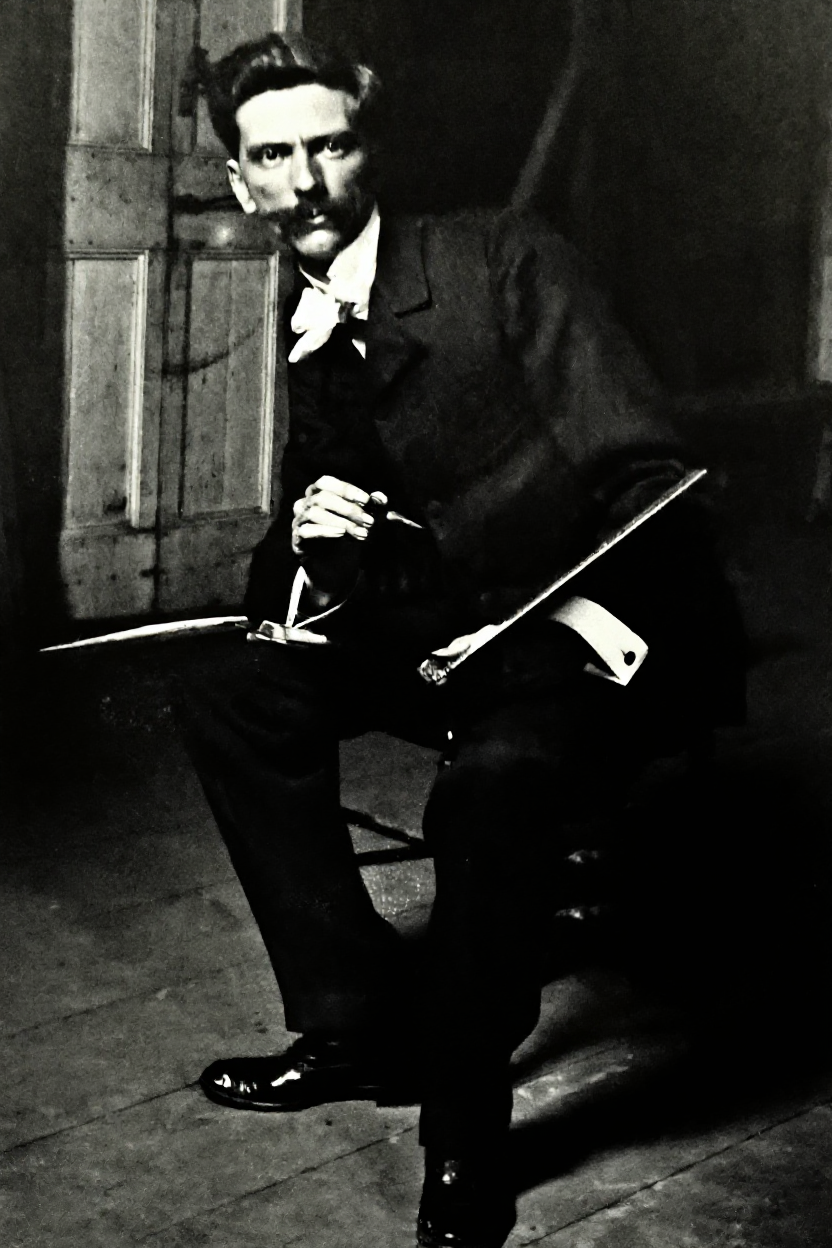
- Self-portrait of Ramón Frade
- Born: Ramón Frade de León; February 8, 1875; Cayey, Puerto Rico
- Died: November 7, 1954 (aged 79); Cayey, Puerto Rico
- Education: Luis Desangles, National Academy of Painting (Santo Domingo)
- Known for: Painting, Architecture
- Notable work: El pan nuestro de cada día, La planchadora, El niño campesino, Rêverie d’Amour, La Volteriana, Virgen del Perpetuo Socorro, Santa Teresita del Niño Jesús
- Movement: Realism

Ramón Frade de León (Cayey, February 8, 1875 – Ibidem, November 7, 1954) was a Puerto Rican painter, photographer and architect. Known in his circles as Don Monche Frade, he received a classical academic education and developed a realist style that portrayed with great intensity the life of the peasantry in Puerto Rico at the beginning of the 20th century. His most celebrated work, El pan nuestro de cada día (1905), became a cultural icon and a symbol of the dignity of the jíbaro.

== Biography ==
Ramón Frade was born on February 8, 1875, in Puerto Rico. His parents were the Spanish photographer Ramón Frade Fernández, from Asturias, and Joaquina León Guzmán, from Cayey. His father had already settled on the island by the mid-19th century, as shown by the baptism in Cayey of his eldest son, Pedro Ramón Frade y León, celebrated in 1865. After Frade Fernández’s death in 1877, the family fell into hardship, and his mother decided to entrust the child’s upbringing, to spare him from poverty, to the couple Nemesio Laforga, an Andalusian merchant, and his Dominican wife. It was not a legal adoption —the child always kept his birth surnames— but a case of family fostering. That same year, at just two years of age, the Laforga couple took him to Spain, where they settled in the city of Valladolid.

His childhood unfolded in Spain, where he completed his early schooling and received a basic education that allowed him to master reading and writing and to adopt a careful Peninsular Castilian pronunciation, a trait that later distinguished him in the Caribbean.

In 1885 the family traveled to the Dominican Republic and settled in Santo Domingo. Frade arrived in the Dominican capital at a time when academicism, painting and photography were beginning to dominate the cultural scene. Thanks to the social standing of his foster parents, he was able to integrate into the urban elite and participate in activities typical of bourgeois youth of the period, including artistic training, considered then an intellectual pursuit.

He first enrolled in the Escuela Normal, founded and directed by the Puerto Rican educator Eugenio María de Hostos, and later in the newly created Municipal School of Drawing. There he received solid training in painting and drawing under Luis Desangles, regarded as one of the great masters of Dominican art.

During his stay in Santo Domingo, Frade worked as an assistant to the photographer and artist Julio Pou, probably between 1891 and 1894. In his studio he learned the craft of photography through the dry-plate method, widely used in the country at the end of the 19th century. There he trained in the entire photographic process: from image capture, negative retouching (clichés) and hand coloring —a technique employed by Pou in his studio— to developing and finishing prints. He also produced views of the city, especially of colonial monuments, which were later reproduced as prints for sale to Pou’s select clientele.

Pou’s photographic studio was not an ordinary establishment but the preferred center of the Dominican elite, especially in the capital. In addition to being a photographer, Pou was a prominent politician, very close to the government of the day. His prestige led him to serve in diplomatic roles as consul in Havana until 1890, and to act as official photographer to President Ulises Heureaux, which further consolidated his position in Dominican society.

As his disciple, Frade was recommended and encouraged by Pou to collaborate as an illustrator for the Dominican magazine El Lápiz, considered the first illustrated publication in the country. In it he had the privilege of publishing his drawings alongside those of well-known artists of the time, such as his teacher Luis Desangles.

In 1892 Frade met the French diplomat and painter Adolphe Laglande, who became his friend and mentor, and with whom he exchanged knowledge that further refined his artistic technique.

In 1896 he moved to Haiti. By then Frade was already a talented artist who mastered perspective, color and composition, as well as a skilled photographer. He began to use black-and-white photography as an auxiliary tool for his work, a common practice among Dominican artists of the period such as Julio Pou and Abelardo Rodríguez Urdaneta, and one that became standard within the island’s academic painting. Frade would never cease to use photography as a resource in his creative process.

== Artistic career ==
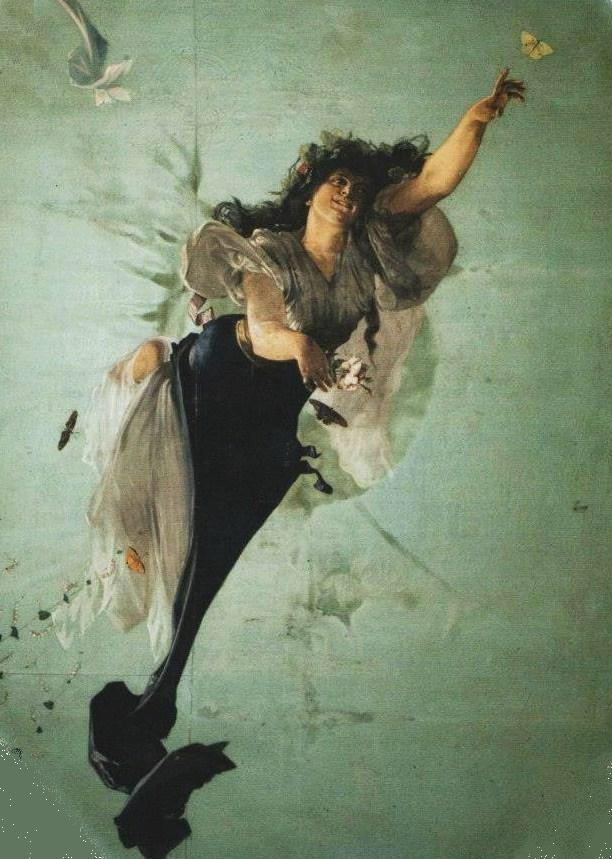
Mural painting by Ramón Frade (Haiti, 1901)

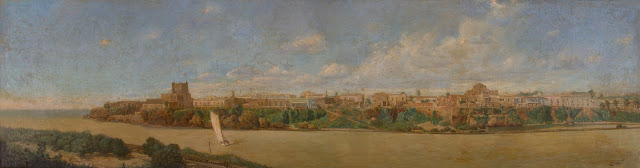
Panoramic view of Santo Domingo from the Ozama River, oil by Ramón Frade, late 19th century (Dominican Republic)

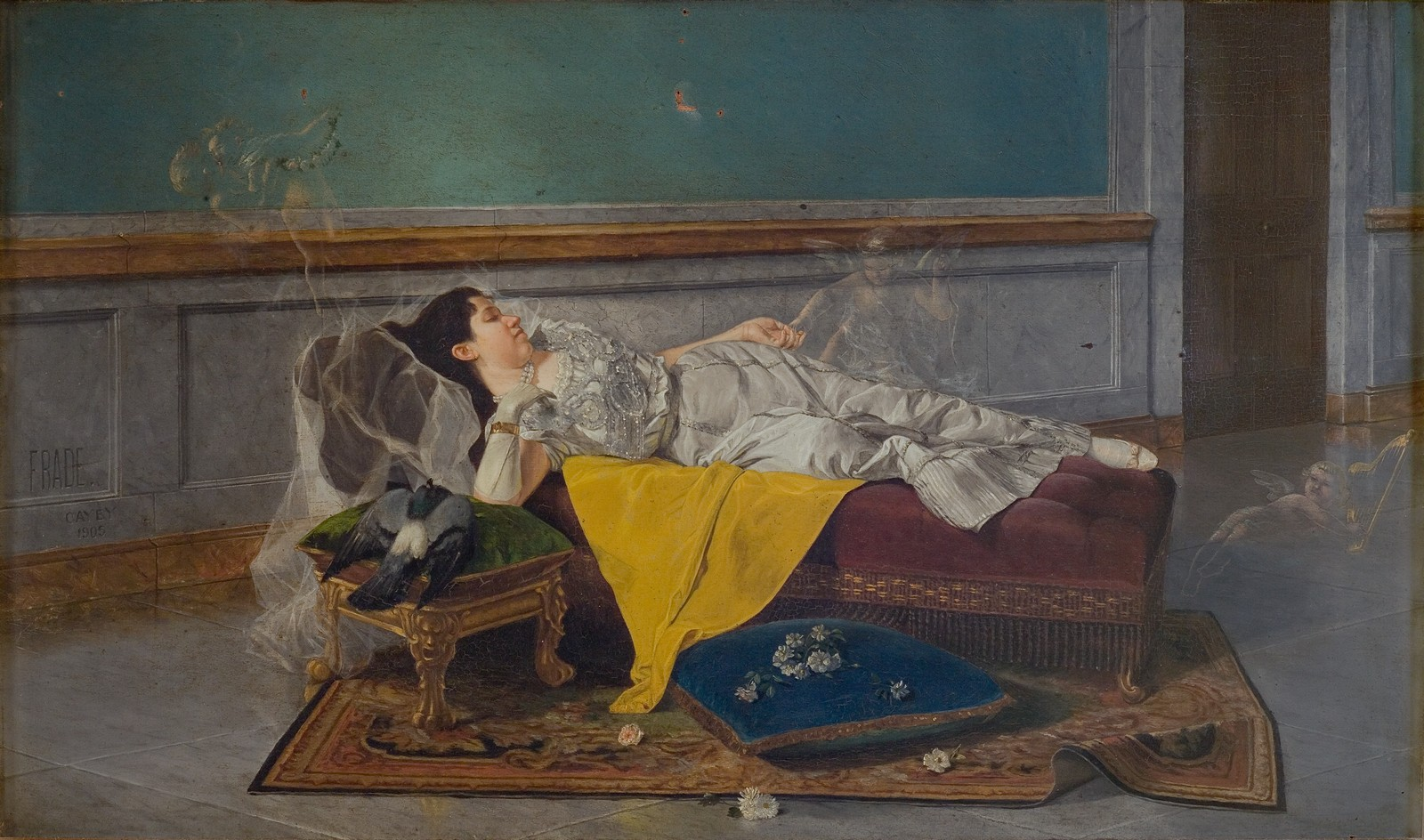
Work painted in 1905 (Puerto Rico)

After his years living in Santo Domingo, Frade acquired comprehensive artistic training that encompassed photography, drawing and painting. During that period he was in contact with renowned artists and photographers, among them Luis Desangles, a master of Dominican painting with a notable career in Cuba, where he directed an art school in Santiago.

Already settled in Haiti, where he had resided since 1896, he presented his oil painting La volteriana at the Paris Salon in 1900, a work that received praise from critics such as Arsenio Arnaldo and Jules Claretie of the French Academy. As was customary in the academic current, participating in international exhibitions and obtaining scholarships formed part of the curriculum an artist had to build. For this reason we see Frade doing the same to forge a reputation in the international arena.

In Haiti he painted portraits such as those of Queen María Cristina and Alfonso XIII. The political turmoil of 1902 forced him to leave the country. After brief stays in Puerto Rico and Jamaica, he settled in Havana as a set designer at the Teatro Tacón (today the National Theater of Cuba) and as a painting instructor. Among his pupils was Hernández Giró, director of the San Alejandro Academy of Painting.

He traveled extensively throughout Latin America. In Venezuela he worked alongside artists such as Tito Salas, Antonio Herrera Toro, Arturo Michelena and Cristóbal Rojas. In Montevideo he was mistaken for Fernando Fader, with whom he struck up a friendship. During this period portraiture was his main medium of expression and his work became dispersed across several countries.

The return of Ramón Frade to Puerto Rico took shape gradually between 1902 and 1907, until he settled permanently in Cayey in 1909. This return marked a turning point in his artistic career. Frade moved from being a classically trained academic painter focused on bourgeois and religious subjects to becoming a modern artist, although still faithful to academic realism.

The influence of European Impressionism began to be evident in his work, especially in the treatment of color and light. He progressively abandoned traditional sfumato in favor of looser, more visible brushstrokes, introducing bolder tonal gradations. In his portraits, the palette acquired greater variety, and the skin tones —with more pronounced blushes and subtler light effects— reveal a more sensitive and naturalistic approach, particularly notable in works produced in the 1940s and 1950s.

This stylistic change was not only technical. It reflected an ideological and emotional transformation. His contact with Puerto Rican rural life, the reconnection with his roots and the influence of his intimate surroundings led him to rethink his themes, now focusing on peasant life, the local landscape and the country’s cultural identity.

== Return to Puerto Rico ==
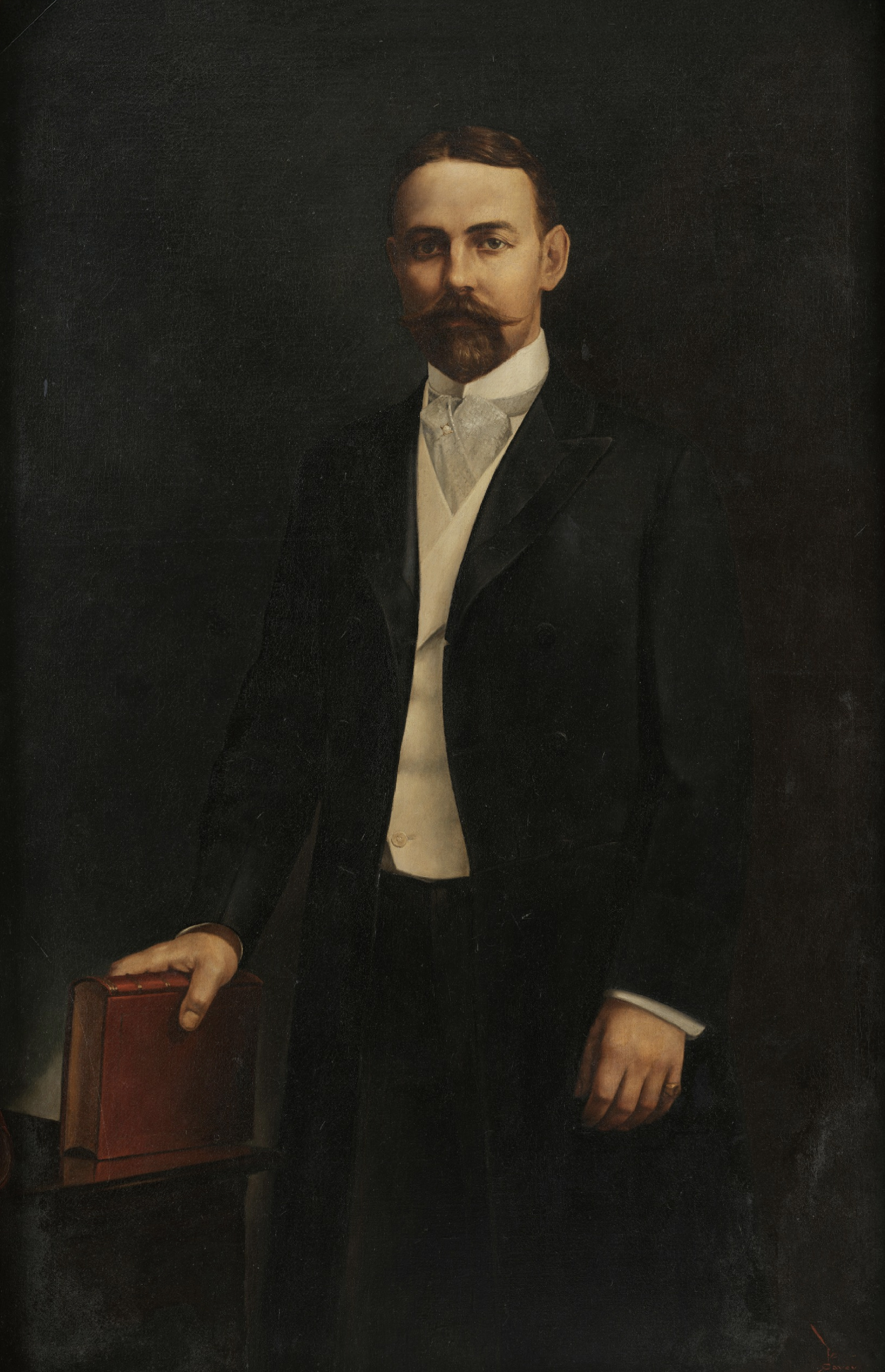
Governor Beekman Winthrope, 1907

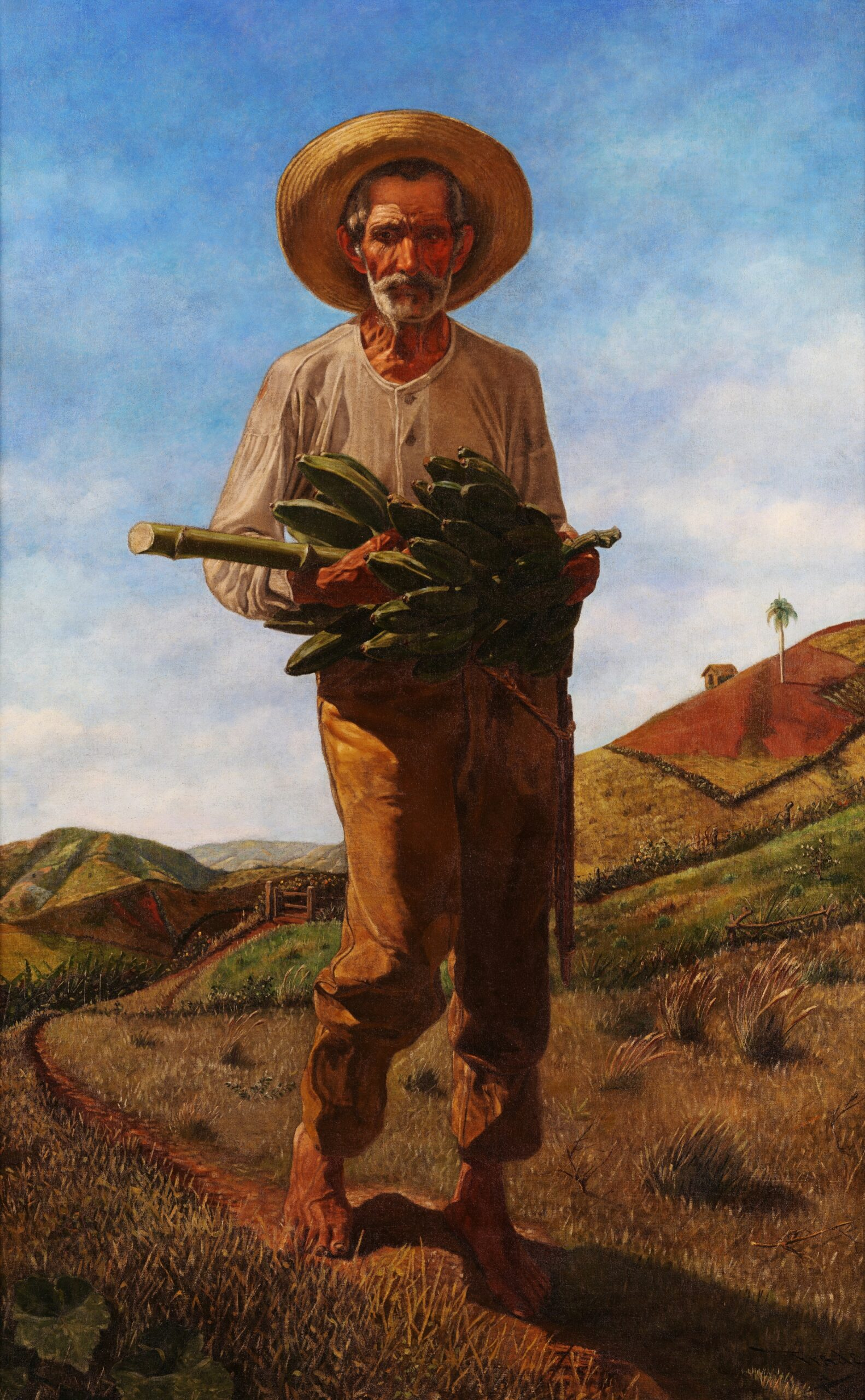
El Pan Nuestro by Ramón Frade, 1905

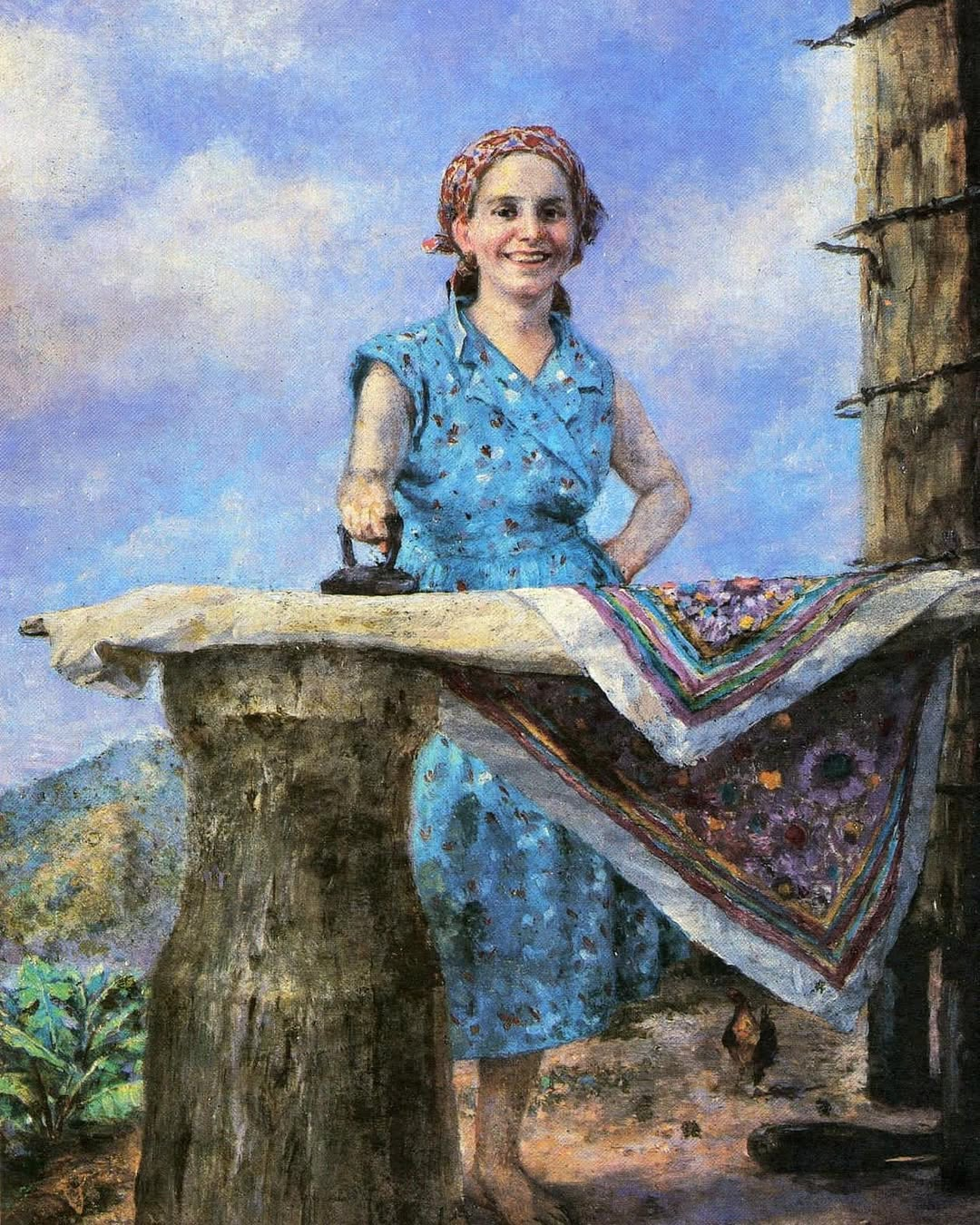
La Planchadora, 1948

Ramón Frade maintained contact with his family and at times traveled to visit them, as happened in 1895, 1902 and 1905. During one of those stays he met a young woman whom he married in 1907, thus strengthening his ties with the island, particularly with his hometown of Cayey.

On May 12, 1907, Frade married Reparada Ortiz Uset, a native of the same town and daughter of Juan Ortiz and Francisca Uset. The marriage record describes her as “de color morena”, a category used in the civil registers of the period to designate people of mixed or olive complexion, which reflects the racial classifications present in Puerto Rican society at the beginning of the 20th century. His union with Rafaela exerted a notable influence on the artist’s sensibility, for from then on his peasant themes were nourished by his relationship with his wife and his family environment, leaving behind the bourgeois subjects he had cultivated in his early years of training.

During this period Frade painted some of his best known works, including Rêverie d’Amour, El pan nuestro de cada día and portraits of prominent figures such as President Theodore Roosevelt and Governor Beekman Winthrop.

These early works by Ramón Frade responded to a concrete purpose. In 1905, with the intention of financing a study trip to Europe, he presented El pan nuestro de cada día to the Chamber of Delegates as part of a scholarship application. The work was positively evaluated by the renowned local painter Francisco Oller, and the Charity Commission recommended granting him an allocation of $720. The proposal was approved by the Finance and Budget Committee on February 25, 1905. However, the auditor and U.S. Secretary of State Regis H. Post vetoed the subsidy, considering that the painting conveyed a nationalist message contrary to the interests of the United States.

Faced with this refusal, Frade opted for an alternative strategy. He offered the government two official portraits —one of President Theodore Roosevelt and another of Governor Beekman Winthrop— which were acquired in 1907 for the sum of $1,200. Thanks to this income he was finally able to finance his trip, which took him to cities such as Rome, Florence, Naples, Venice, Milan and Barcelona. This European experience not only enriched his artistic training but also consolidated his academic style. Upon returning to Puerto Rico, Frade settled definitively in his hometown of Cayey, establishing there his personal and professional life from 1909 onward.

The lack of formal galleries and museums in Cayey and in the rest of Puerto Rico meant that an institutional art circuit had not yet been consolidated. For this reason the painter’s house-studio functioned as a production space and, at the same time, as a place of exhibition. This dynamic gave Frade greater creative autonomy. When there were no official commissions —such as portraits of politicians or religious works— he could freely choose his subjects and display them in his own studio.

== Architecture ==
For Ramón Frade, architecture became a profession that complemented painting. Aware of the difficult living conditions in Cayey, around 1909 he decided to broaden his training through distance studies at the American School of Correspondence in Chicago, Illinois. There he began studies in architecture that he completed in 1913, which later allowed him to obtain a degree and a license to practice as an architect and surveyor. His preparation was not limited to a single discipline. He studied three programs by correspondence —topographic engineering (license no. 625), architecture (license no. 626) and land surveying (license no. 428)— receiving at the age of 52 the official certification of the Puerto Rico Examining Board of Engineers, Architects and Surveyors, founded in 1928.

Thanks to this training, Frade was able to devote himself to various tasks related to the construction sector, from technical work to architectural design. Among his most notable projects are the design for the remodeling of the Cayey Municipal Cemetery, several residential projects in the Republican style and a square dedicated to Eugenio María de Hostos, whom he had met during his years of training in Santo Domingo. His architectural work, as evidenced by the documents and plans preserved, was concentrated mainly in Cayey: a hardware and notions store for the Aragunde family, residences for the Mendoza family, furniture design for the Farmacia Planella and a definitive proposal for the Cayey Municipal Cemetery (1917). The projects carried out by Frade exceed the estimated figure of 75, a considerably high number for a town like Caney.

Even so, his work transcended the local sphere on two occasions linked to design competitions: a proposal for the Columbus Lighthouse in Santo Domingo, Dominican Republic, and the design for the ceiling painting of the San Juan Municipal Theater.

The collection of architectural drawings, documents and photographs related to this professional facet of Frade is now preserved in the Ramón Frade Museum of the University College of Cayey, an institution that received this archive in 1986.

== Notable paintings ==
Frade’s pictorial work outside Puerto Rico also has great artistic quality, but to date it remains missing, with some pieces known in the Dominican Republic, Cuba and Haiti. His greatest legacy, however, is preserved in Puerto Rico.

Some of these works are:

- El pan nuestro de cada día (1905) – Museum of the Institute of Puerto Rican Culture, San Juan. His most emblematic work, it portrays a jíbaro carrying a bunch of plantains and is a symbol of Puerto Rican identity.
- Jíbaro en la vereda – Dr. Pío López Martínez Museum, University of Puerto Rico, Cayey Campus.
- Portrait of Governor Beekman Winthrop (1907) – Oil on canvas, Institute of Puerto Rican Culture.
- Rêverie d’Amour – A romantic work, prior to his return to Puerto Rico.
- View of the City of Santo Domingo from the Ozama River – Large format work, commissioned by the Dominican Government.
- La Volteriana – Presented at the Paris Salon during his stay in Haiti.
- Virgen del Perpetuo Socorro – Religious painting lost or destroyed between the 1960s and 1970s, formerly located in the Church of Our Lady of the Assumption in Cayey.
- Santa Teresita del Niño Jesús – Another commissioned religious work, preserved in Cayey.

== Frade and photography ==
Since the late 19th century photography became an essential support for many European and American painters, and in Frade’s case it was integrated as a tool for observing and studying the figure.

In addition to his patriotic vision of the rural popular type, Frade conceived photographic portraits to transfer them to painting. The image served as a basis to sustain a rational gaze on figure and form. Heir to 19th-century realism, he used photography to sharpen observation and raise the precision of drawing. In a letter to Osiris Delgado (1937) he affirmed that painting was “drawing with colors, and that to draw well is to see well”. This reasoning led him to the systematic use of photography as support, without diminishing the artist’s manual skill. He followed criteria close to those formulated by Charles Meryon and compiled by Scharf, according to which photography assists the artist but never replaces the sketch.

During his adolescence in Santo Domingo, Frade approached photography thanks to the Dominican master Julio Pou (1862–1940), official photographer to the President of the Republic. In 1894 he worked in his studio as a negative retoucher, where he learned lighting and transparent hand coloring applied to black-and-white or sepia portraits, a highly demanded practice at the time. His earliest photographs, devoted to buildings in Santo Domingo, reflect 19th-century documentary practice and reveal compositional sensitivity in balance and proportion.

Once established in Cayey in 1902, Frade extensively recorded the rural and urban environment. He documented the parish church, the hospital, the cemetery, tobacco warehouses, streets and entrances to nearby neighborhoods. His views of geography, roads and agricultural labor form an early visual anthropology of the peasantry, where the camera captures dignity and psychological truth.

The genre that most strongly defined Frade’s photographic work was portraiture. He created a catalog of rural popular types that transcended the merely sociological to become symbol. His models, neighbors from his surroundings who posed in his studio, assumed scenographic roles devised by the artist, in continuity with his experience in theater in Santo Domingo. These images established a typology charged with dignity and identity, linked to later pictorial works such as El pan nuestro (1905). In this way Frade emancipated the portrait from its descriptive character and transformed it into a symbolic construct, unique in the history of Puerto Rican art.

The bond between Ramón Frade and photography has family roots. His father, Ramón Frade Fernández, from Asturias and settled in Cayey, worked as a photographer in the second half of the 19th century. Among his works there is a portrait of Doña Marcelina Warren, the artist’s godmother, made around 1875. This image reveals not only his skill as a draftsman but also his command of photographic technique, since he incorporated into the negative a hand-drawn ornamental frame that became part of the composition. Frade (the son) treasured this work from childhood, and together with an allegorical drawing by his father it became one of his earliest visual references. The paternal influence was so decisive that at the age of fifteen he created his first oil painting titled Mi padre enfermo (1890), made over a photographic portrait of his father, in a gesture of homage that symbolically marked the beginning of his artistic career.

== Later years ==
Until his death in 1954, Frade devoted himself fully to painting. Many of his works were not direct commissions, which allowed him to choose subjects freely and exhibit them in his own house-studio. He painted commissioned religious works such as the Virgen del Perpetuo Socorro and Santa Teresita del Niño Jesús. He also designed a project for the Columbus Lighthouse in Santo Domingo and produced landscapes and Puerto Rican types.

In 1945 Ramón Frade painted the Altar of Our Lady of Mercy in the Church of Our Lady of the Assumption in Cayey, which is still preserved. Years later, around 1954, he created in the same temple the Altar of Our Lady of Perpetual Help, which was removed between the late 1960s and early 1970s. While the former remains, the latter was lost, which makes it one of the artist’s most remembered missing works. Frade was awarded the Benemerenti Medal by Pope Pius XII for his service to the Catholic Church.

Ramón Frade died on November 7, 1954 in his hometown of Cayey at the age of 79, due to complications from generalized arteriosclerosis. He was buried in the Cayey Municipal Cemetery. His death certificate lists his profession as “artist and professor”.

After Frade’s death in 1954, it was his widow, Reparada Ortiz Uset —who lived until 1957— who authorized the transfer of the painter’s artistic estate to the University of Puerto Rico. Once she also passed away that same year, the transfer could be formalized. The absence of direct descendants facilitated the conversion of his legacy into public heritage and, over time, into the nucleus of the Dr. Pío López Martínez Museum of Art in Cayey. Today Frade is remembered as one of the great masters of Puerto Rican academic realism and as a reference for the island’s cultural identity, whose legacy continues to be preserved and disseminated in his native city.

== Legacy ==
Ramón Frade is remembered as one of the great masters of Puerto Rican academic painting and of Latin America in the early 20th century. His work, with a marked academic orientation, portrayed the life of the peasantry on the island of Borinquen and places him as one of the main exponents of costumbrismo in Puerto Rico. The humble condition of his mother, Joaquina León Guzmán, a peasant woman from Cayey, and his later marriage, which marked his return and permanent settlement in his hometown, decisively influenced his artistic sensibility. From that root emerged canvases that became a reflection of Puerto Rican identity, capturing in images the dignity of the jíbaro and the cultural spirit of the nation in its early modern days. His travels throughout the Americas and his life in Santo Domingo also instilled in him ideals of freedom for Puerto Rico and a deep love for his own culture.

== Public collections ==
Works by Ramón Frade are part of several cultural institutions in Puerto Rico and the Dominican Republic, including:

- Institute of Puerto Rican Culture, San Juan, Puerto Rico.
- Museo de Arte de Puerto Rico, San Juan, Puerto Rico.
- Museo de Historia, Antropología y Arte, University of Puerto Rico, Río Piedras Campus, San Juan, Puerto Rico.
- Dirección Nacional de Patrimonio Monumental de Santo Domingo, Santo Domingo, Dominican Republic.
- Smithsonian American Art Museum, Washington, D.C., United States.

== Bibliography ==
- Delgado, Osiris. Ramón Frade: pintor puertorriqueño. Institute of Puerto Rican Culture, San Juan, 1971.
- Frade León, Ramón. El pan nuestro y otras obras. University of Puerto Rico, Cayey Campus.
- J. Bayrón Toro, “El pan nuestro de Ramón Frade”, in Athanor: Journal of Art History, vol. XXII, Florida State University, 2004.
- Institute of Puerto Rican Culture. Ramón Frade y el realismo puertorriqueño, exhibition catalogue, San Juan, 1985.
- Quiñones Vélez, Mariel. In situ: visiones del paisaje en las Grandes Antillas. Dr. Pío López Martínez Museum, UPR-Cayey, 2022.
- Museo de Arte de Puerto Rico. Permanent Collection: Ramón Frade (consulted on Google Arts & Culture).
