= Francisco Oller =

Puerto Rican painter (1833–1917)

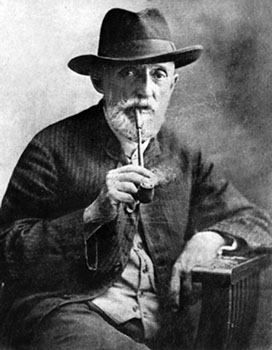
- Francisco Oller
- Born: Francisco Manuel Oller Cestero; June 17, 1833; Bayamon, Puerto Rico
- Died: May 17, 1917 (aged 83); San Juan, Puerto Rico
- Education: Royal Academy of San Fernando, Thomas Couture, Gustave Courbet
- Known for: Painting
- Movement: Impressionism
- Patrons: Museo de Arte de Ponce

Francisco Manuel Oller y Cestero (June 17, 1833 – May 17, 1917) was a Puerto Rican painter, and the only Latin American artist to have played a role in the development of Impressionism. One of the most distinguished transatlantic painters of his day, Oller helped transform painting in the Caribbean.

== Biography ==
=== Early years ===
Oller was born in Bayamón, Puerto Rico, the third of four children of aristocratic and wealthy parents Cayetano Juan Oller y Fromesta and María del Carmen Cestero Dávila. His paternal grandparents were from Catalonia and his maternal side had roots in Puerto Rico since the seventeenth century. Oller was baptised in the Cathedral of San Juan. When he was eleven he began to study art under the tutelage of Juan Cleto Noa, a painter who had an art academy in San Juan, Puerto Rico. There, Oller demonstrated that he had an enormous talent in art and in 1848, when Oller was fifteen years old, General Juan Prim, Governor of Puerto Rico, offered Oller the opportunity to continue his studies in Rome. However, the offer was not accepted as Oller's mother felt that he was too young to travel abroad alone.

When Oller was eighteen, he moved to Madrid, Spain, where he studied painting at the Royal Academy of San Fernando, under the tutelage of Don Federico de Madrazo y Kuntz, director of the Prado Museum. In 1858, he moved to Paris, France where he studied under Thomas Couture. Later he enrolled to study art in the Louvre under the instruction of Gustave Courbet. During his free time, Oller, who had a baritone type of singing voice, worked and participated in local Italian operas. He frequently visited cafés where he met with fellow artists. He also became a friend of fellow Puerto Ricans Ramón Emeterio Betances and Salvador Carbonell del Toro, who were expatriates in France due to their political beliefs. In 1859, Oller exhibited some of his artistic works next to those of Bazille, Renoir, Monet, and Sisley. For a short time, Paul Cézanne was one of Oller's students, although their professional relationship deteriorated with time. By 1865, Oller was the first Puerto Rican and Hispanic Impressionist artist. In 1868, he founded the Free Academy of Art of Puerto Rico.

=== Realism Period (1840–1903) ===
Oller's paintings were a big contribution of history during this time. His paintings showed conflicts and daily lives of people outside of his home country as well as subjects internally. The author Edward J. Sullivan describes in his book, From San Juan to Paris and Back: Francisco Oller and Caribbean Art in the Era of Impressionism:

In the normal course of his day, the artist would have observed objects of quotidian use to the slaves and free persons of color with whom he regularly interacted. His world was not only the cultivated, Europeanized milieus of the Puerto Rican bourgeoisie, but also the realities of the relatively small city of San Juan, where he was born and where most of his career developed. Even during his many years of residence in Madrid and Paris, he would have carried with him the cultural baggage of his place of origin. His familiarity with the different strata of society on the Caribbean island of his birth was a constant reality as he intermingled with Realist and Impressionist artists and others who constituted his world on the other side of the Atlantic. This aspect of his personality cannot be easily separated from the other. Oller was a person of multiple cultural affinities, which allowed him to embrace what he saw abroad, but also to interiorize and reformulate those elements for purposes that conformed to his vision of tropical reality.

Upon his return to Puerto Rico from France in 1866 he found himself face-to-face with slavery and he would create a number of works including El negro flageado ("the flogged black man"), El castigo del negro enamorado ("the punishment of the black man in love"), and others depicting slavery in Puerto Rico.

=== Impression Period (1874–1893) ===
Oller spent nearly two decades in Europe working alongside the pioneers of Impressionism, and, through his travels, participated in a vibrant exchange of aesthetic ideas, forging his own brand of international modernism while engaging social issues unique to the Caribbean. During his three trips to Paris, Oller affiliated himself with Paul Cézanne, fellow Caribbean artist Camille Pissarro (born in St. Thomas), and other members of the Impressionist and Post-Impressionist movements.

=== Later years ===
Throughout his later life and after his death, Oller was compared to Jose Campeche as one of the most outstanding figures of the arts in his country. Campeche created an impressive body of portraits and religious subjects. In 1884, he founded an art school for young women, which later became known as the Universidad Nacional. In 1871, Spain honored Oller by naming him a member of the Order of Carlos III, and a year later he became the official painter of the royal court of Amadeo I. Oller developed an interest in bringing out the reality of Puerto Rico's landscape, its people and culture through his works of art. Oller's paintings can be found in museums worldwide, including the Musée d'Orsay in France. Oller died on May 17, 1917, in San Juan, Puerto Rico. He was buried at the Santa María Magdalena de Pazzis Cemetery in San Juan, Puerto Rico.

== Styles and influences ==
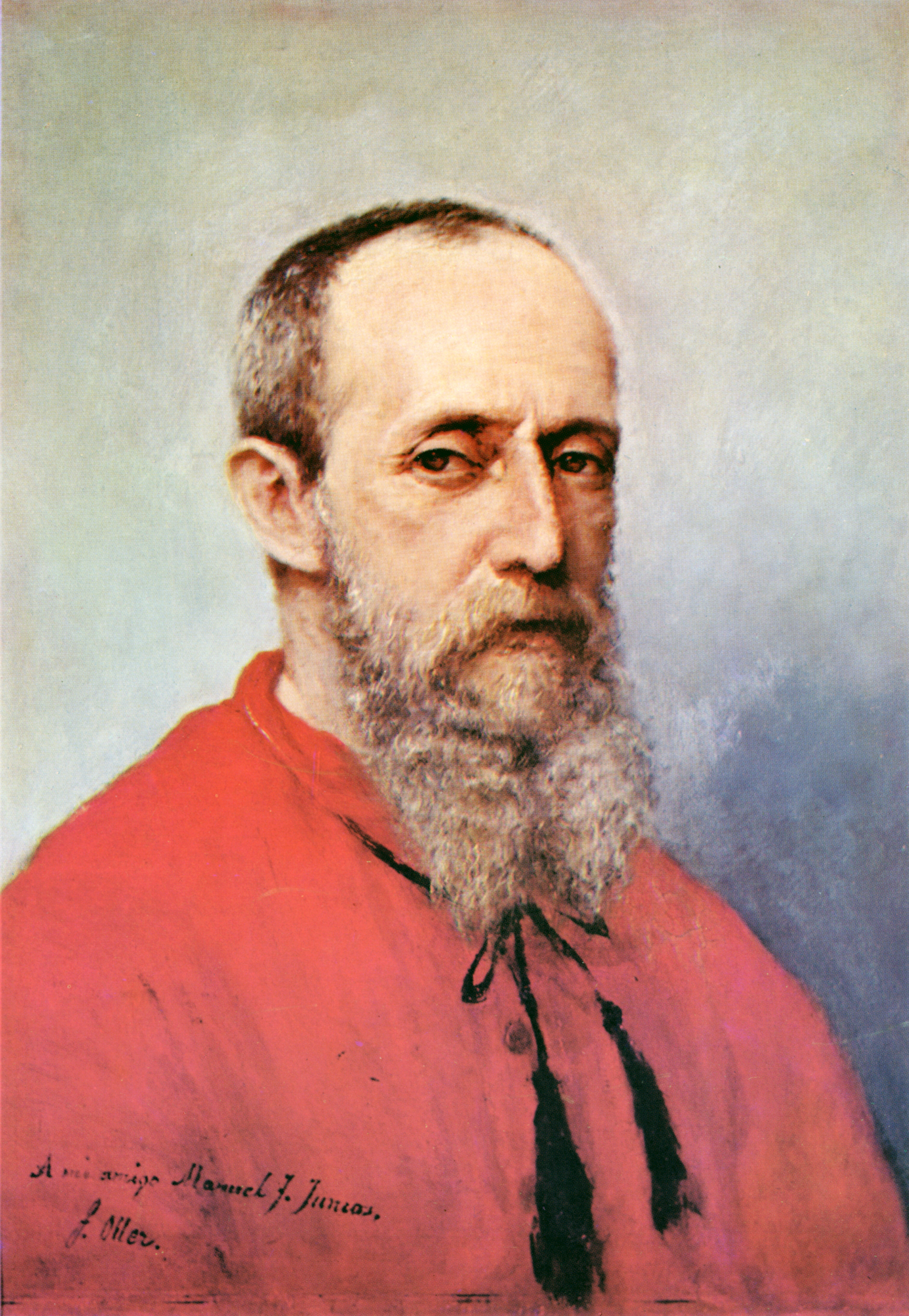
Self-portrait, c. 1892

Oller was a prolific painter with works ranging in topic from still lifes and landscapes to historical events and portraiture. While he was involved with several painting movements, Realism, Naturalism and Impressionism; he is best known for his Impressionist works. Oller's style of painting made him stand out among the many artists that took part in the depiction of Puerto Rico's lush tropical landscapes of both rural and urban landscapes and provided a realistic image of Puerto Rico compared to the European artists that flocked over to the Caribbean to paint lush, idealized landscapes of the environment. His painting style provided a historical context for his painting, providing a cultural view through his own lens. He was involved with many art movements from the realist art movement, the naturalist art movement, and the impressionist art movement of which he is best known for. In his life, Oller spent nearly two decades in Europe working alongside the pioneers of these art movements, drawing influence from them in the evolution of his artwork. One characteristic that is quite apparent in his work that he drew influence from another artist is his sober, unidealized depictions of rural workers in Puerto Rico.

The "plantation portraits" by Oller, as well as those by Mendes Belisario in Jamaica and dozens of others throughout the Caribbean and the southern United States (where the plantations mostly served the cotton industry), were part of a long tradition of depictions of agriculture and servitude. Rarely, if ever, depicting the negative associations of enslaved or indentured labor, they attempted to create nostalgic views of the "old homestead", or a faraway venue of nostalgia. While Oller's plantation pictures were executed in a somewhat different spirit, they nonetheless pertain to this genre that played a significant role throughout the development of visualization in a Caribbean context over a period of some 150 years.

Oller was influenced by Barbizon School painter Jean-François Millet to paint in this way, allowing him to provide a realistic depiction of the life of Puerto Ricans in their historical context. In his early years, Francisco Oller was taught by European painters at the Academia, including French neoclassical painter Jean Baptiste Vermay. His main source of influence in his early years comes from two painters, the Spaniard Luis Paret y Alcázar and, most significantly, the Puerto Rican José Campeche y Jordán. The artwork of José Campeche provided Oller a major point of reference for him in his young years as a developing artist. Francisco Oller was compared to Campeche as one of the most prominent artists in his country's history. Oller not only drew inspiration from the work of Campeche but copied works of art by him and even lived in the artist's former house.

== Selected works ==
- El pleito de la herencia (1854–56)
- Portrait of Manuel Sicardó (1866–68)
- Landscape with hut (1870–97)
- El estudiante (1874)
- The Basilica of Lourdes from the Gave River (1876–77)
- Battle of Treviño (1879)
  - Oller painted Colonel Juan Contreras as the central figure during a battle that took place on July 8, 1875. The battle was part of the Carlist Wars, a 19th-century war over the succession of the Spanish throne. Oller painted this during his final visit to Europe, where he was appointed as the official painter of the Spanish Court of King Alfonso XII. The artist opposed the conventions of realism and precision of more traditional military paintings. Instead, he uses Impressionistic style to capture the atmosphere and drama of the moment. Dabs of color blend together to create an out-of-focus effect. Oller also effectively used lines to draw attention to Colonel Contreras; the clouds, hills, and soldiers direct focus to the central figure. The author Edward J. Sullivan wrote:
    The Battle of Treviño denotes a significant moment for Oller within the world of Spanish art. The painting represents an official theme of recent national history, through which the artist places himself in the tradition of military images that was of great importance in later nineteenth-century Iberian painting. The genre of battle painting is one of the least avant-garde artistic forms. Oller, an artist often associated with the "new" in art, is here going against that grain and inserting himself directly within a mode most often practiced by artists of a decidedly conservative personality. Nevertheless, he used this form as a way to experiment with the possibilities of a spontaneity and pictorial freedom within the framework of traditional subject matter.
- Hacienda La Fortuna (1885)
- Portrait of Angelina Serracante (1885–88)
- Las lavanderas (1887–88)
- La ceiba de Ponce (1888)
- Road with Thatched Huts (1890)
- Sugar Mill (1890)
- La escuela del Maestro Rafael Cordero (1890–92)
  - The subject of this painting, Rafael Cordero, was the founder of the first school in Puerto Rico for both the formerly enslaved and children of enslaved persons. By the late 1820s, the school admitted male children of all races and social strata. Cordero was both the sole instructor and manual laborer, making cigars and cigarettes in his workshop, where class took place. We can see his tobacco work table in the bottom right-hand corner. The children are of different socioeconomic classes and skin tones; the artist portrays the importance and accessibility of education to all races. The two children in the foreground, one holding an egg and the other holding bread, suggests the intermingling of race. As an abolitionist himself, Oller portrays the acceptance of race in the developing country during this time. Cordero's expression is exasperated and exhausted; despite this, he persists to provide education to the children. The setting is very conservative with religious symbolism on the walls. The walls are plain and cracked. Oller portrayed his subject as glamorous, as an "unsung hero".
- Still Life with Avocados and Utensils (1891)
- Still life with Soursops (1891)
- El Velorio ("The Wake") (1893)
  - This 8-by-13-foot painting was one of the few that had survived while many of his works were lost or damaged beyond repair. El Velorio was not seen as the most glamorous but was shown in the Paris Salon in 1895. Oller uses small, visible brush strokes and an emphasis on an accurate depiction of light and mastery of color in its changing qualities in his paintings. The painting depicts the wake or, in Puerto Rican Spanish, "baquiné" of a dead child laid on a table covered with flowers. Participants totally ignore the child and instead celebrate with food, drink, games, songs, dancing and prayer. The reason for this is that they believe it is a time for celebration for the child has become an angel and should be properly sent off. All the while the parents are mourning over the loss of their child and some are consoling the mother. Oller's painting is considered a Puerto Rican national treasure and is not allowed to leave the Museum of History, Anthropology, and Art at the University of Puerto Rico's Río Piedras campus.
- George W. Davis (1900)
- Portrait of Eugenio María de Hostos (1903–17)
- Landscape with Royal Palm (1910)
- Bodegón con piñas
- El Cesante

== Legacy and remembrance ==
Oller was responsible for bringing Realism and Impressionism to San Juan. Combining them with the artistic traditions of San Juan, he revolutionized the school of painting in Puerto Rico and throughout the Caribbean region. Oller also helped bring outside world events by drawing them and displaying them publicly. Many Puerto Rican artists have followed in Oller's footsteps, including Ramón Fradé (1875-1954) and Miguel Pou (1880-1968).

The municipality of Cataño in Puerto Rico, named a high school after him, and the City of New York renamed P.S.61 in The Bronx P.S. Francisco Oller. There is also a Francisco Oller Library in the Escuela de Artes Plásticas y Diseño de Puerto Rico (School of Plastic Arts and Design of Puerto Rico) in Old San Juan. The Francisco Oller Museum, where many artists, such as Tomás Batista, exhibit their work, is located in the city of Bayamón. In Buffalo, New York there is a Francisco Oller and Diego Rivera Museum of Art where Manuel Rivera-Ortiz and other artists have exhibited their work.

== Gallery ==
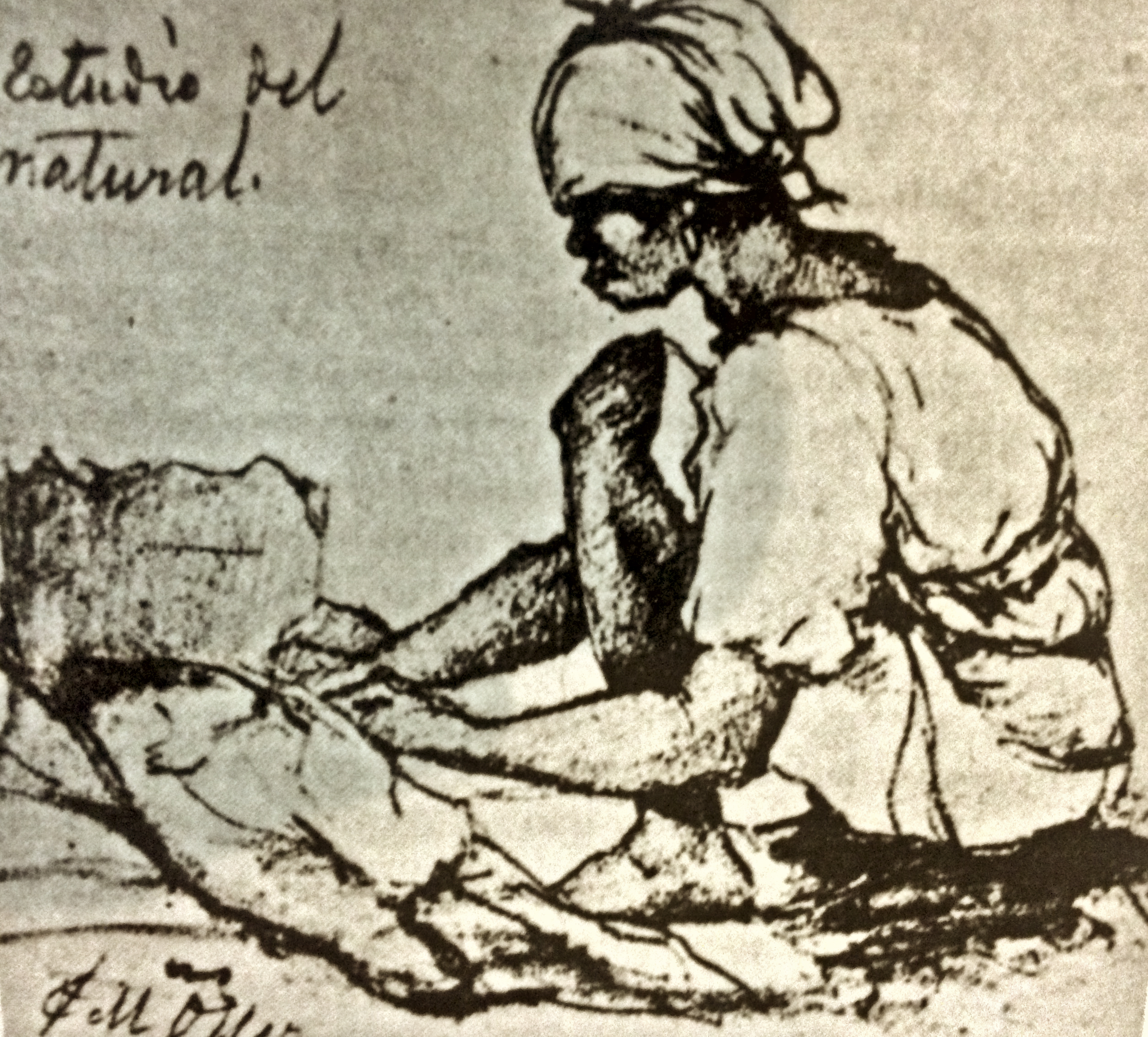
Estudio del Natural (1866–72)

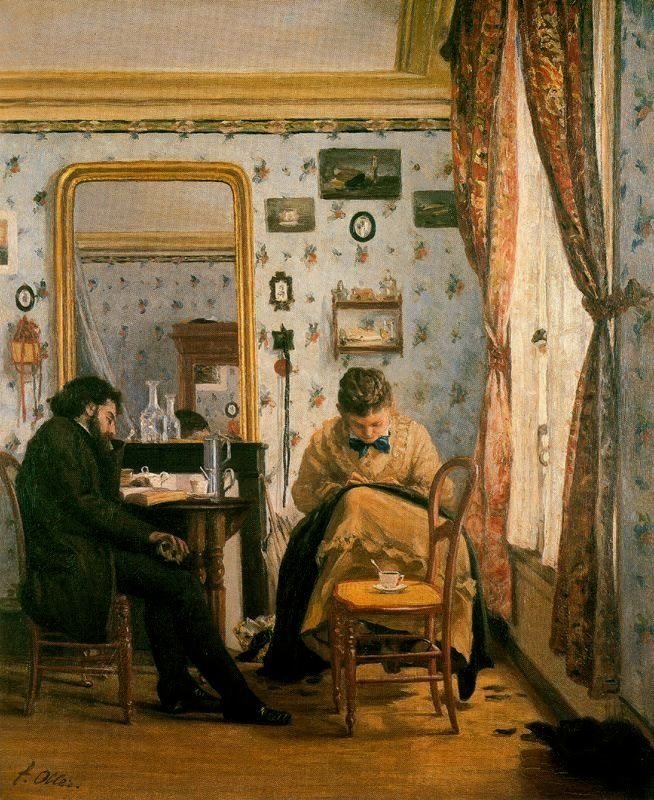
L'Étudiant (1874) Musée d'Orsay

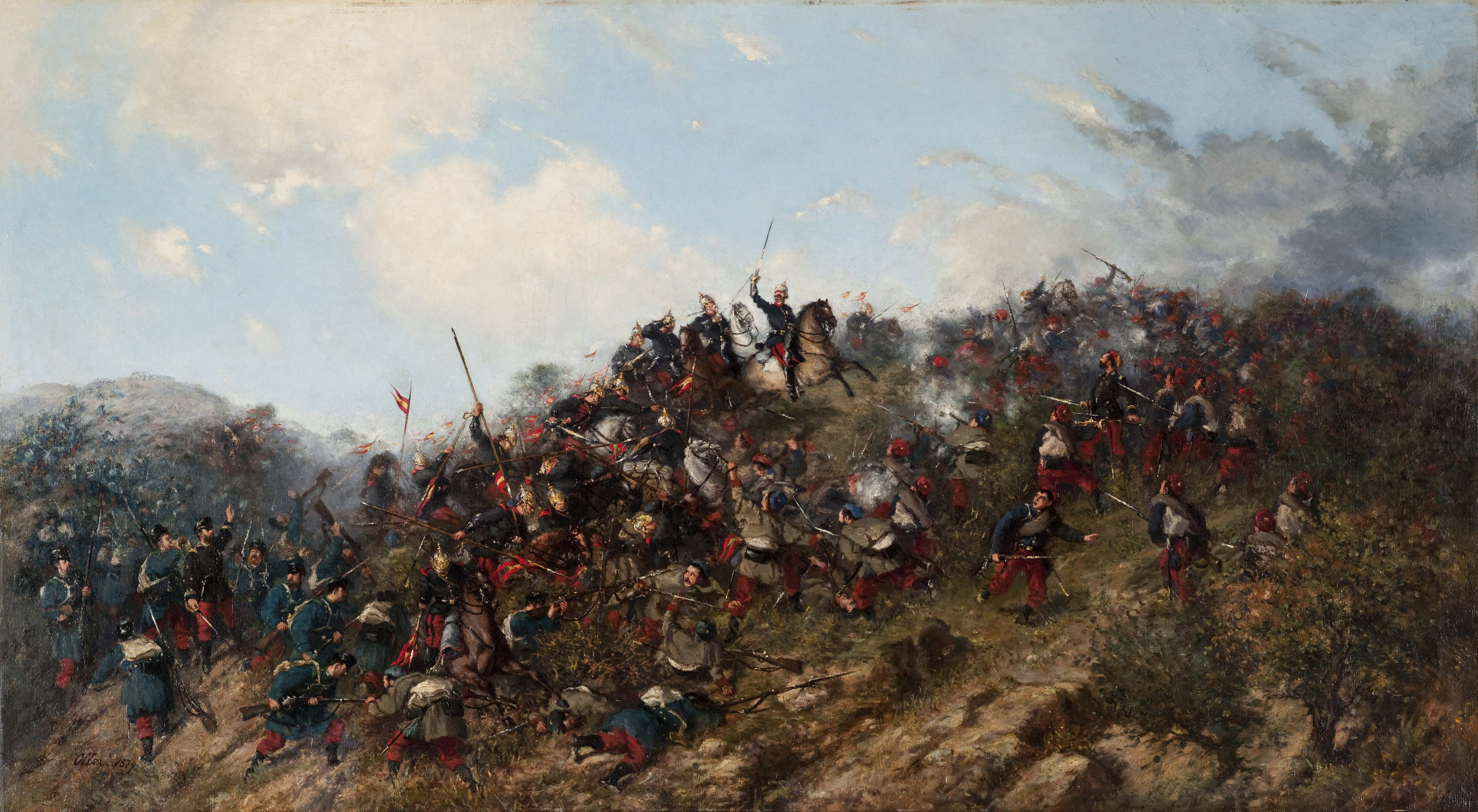
La batalla de Treviño (1879) Museo de Arte de Ponce

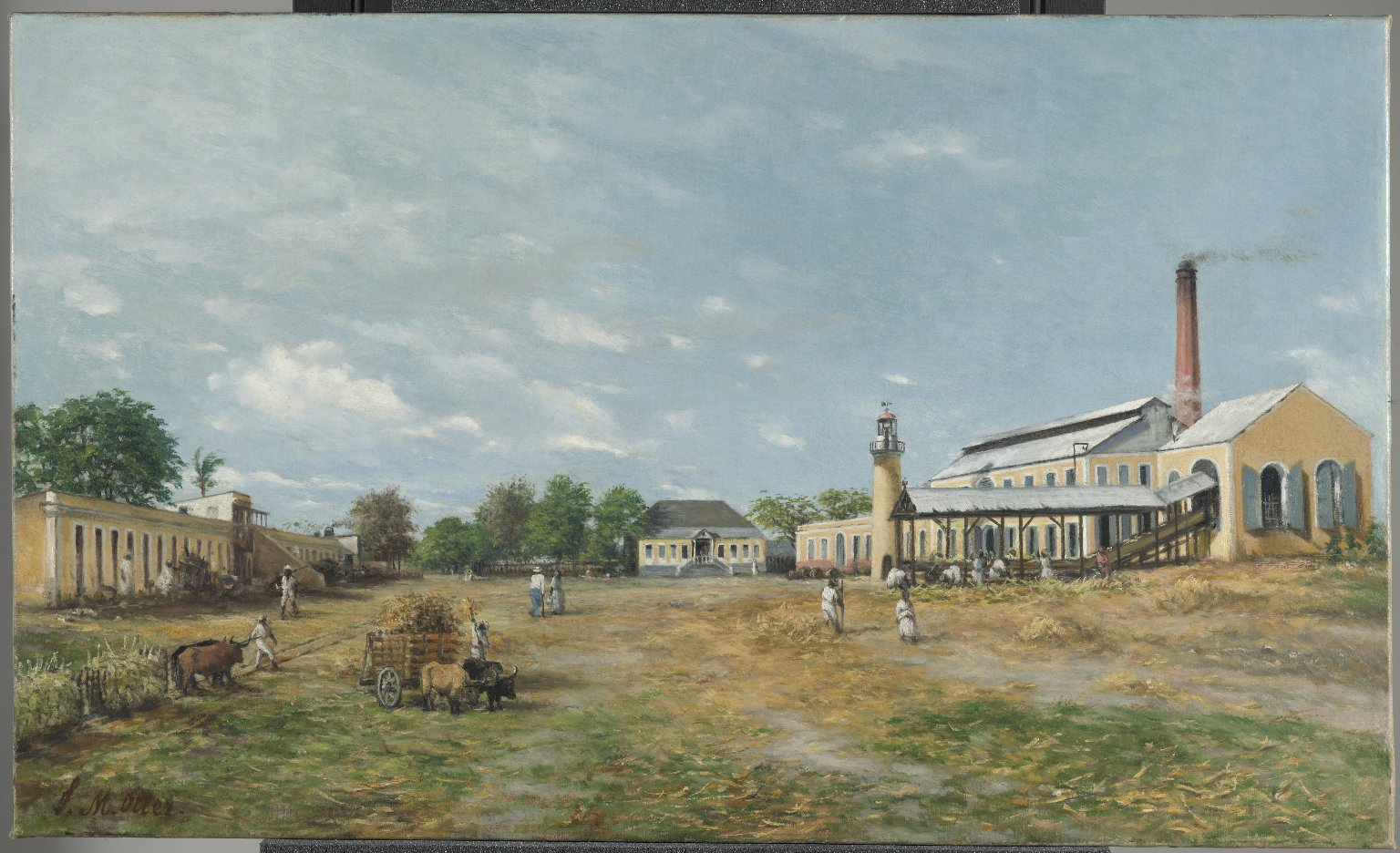
Hacienda La Fortuna (1885) Brooklyn Museum

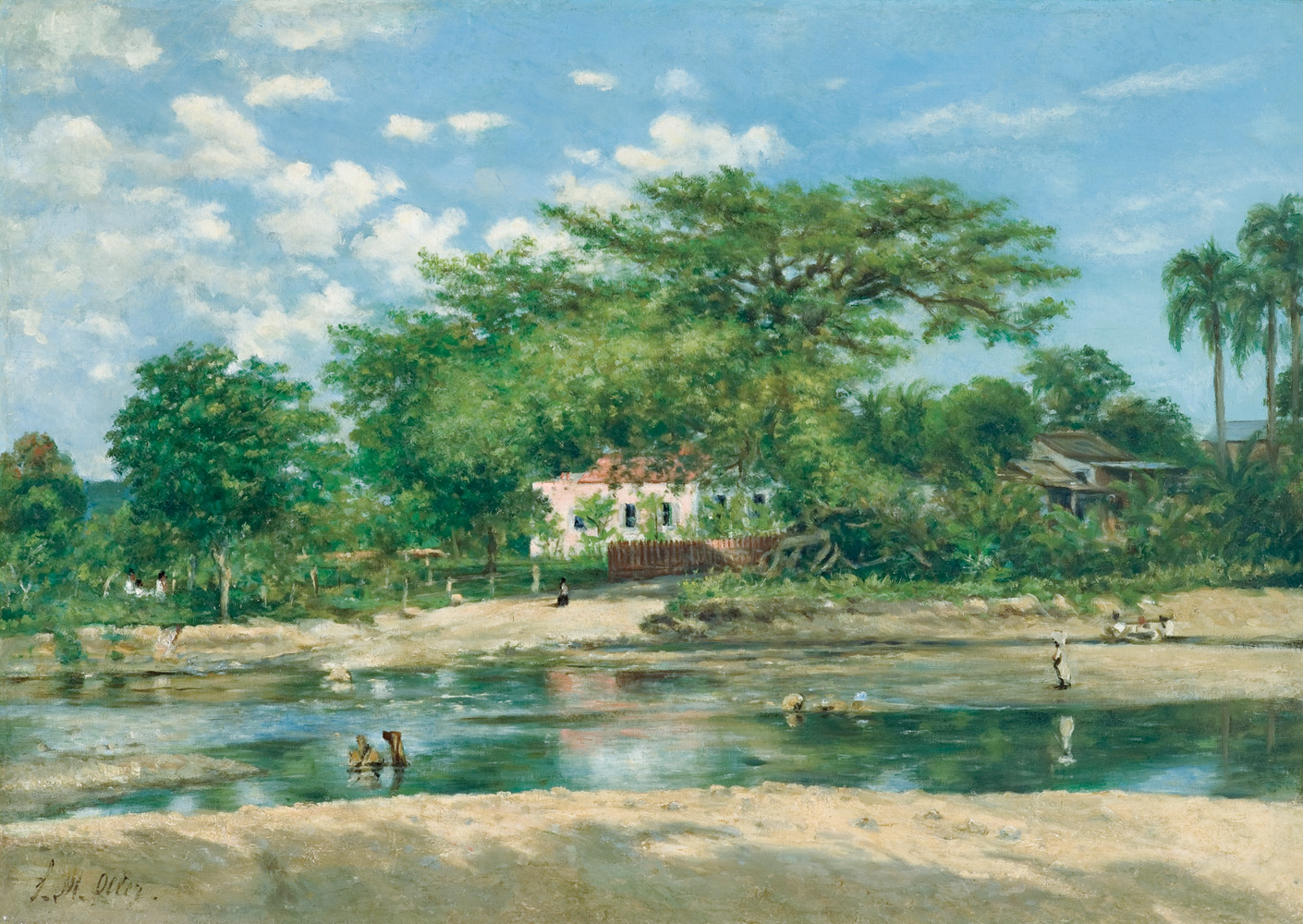
La ceiba de Ponce (1888) Museo de Arte de Ponce

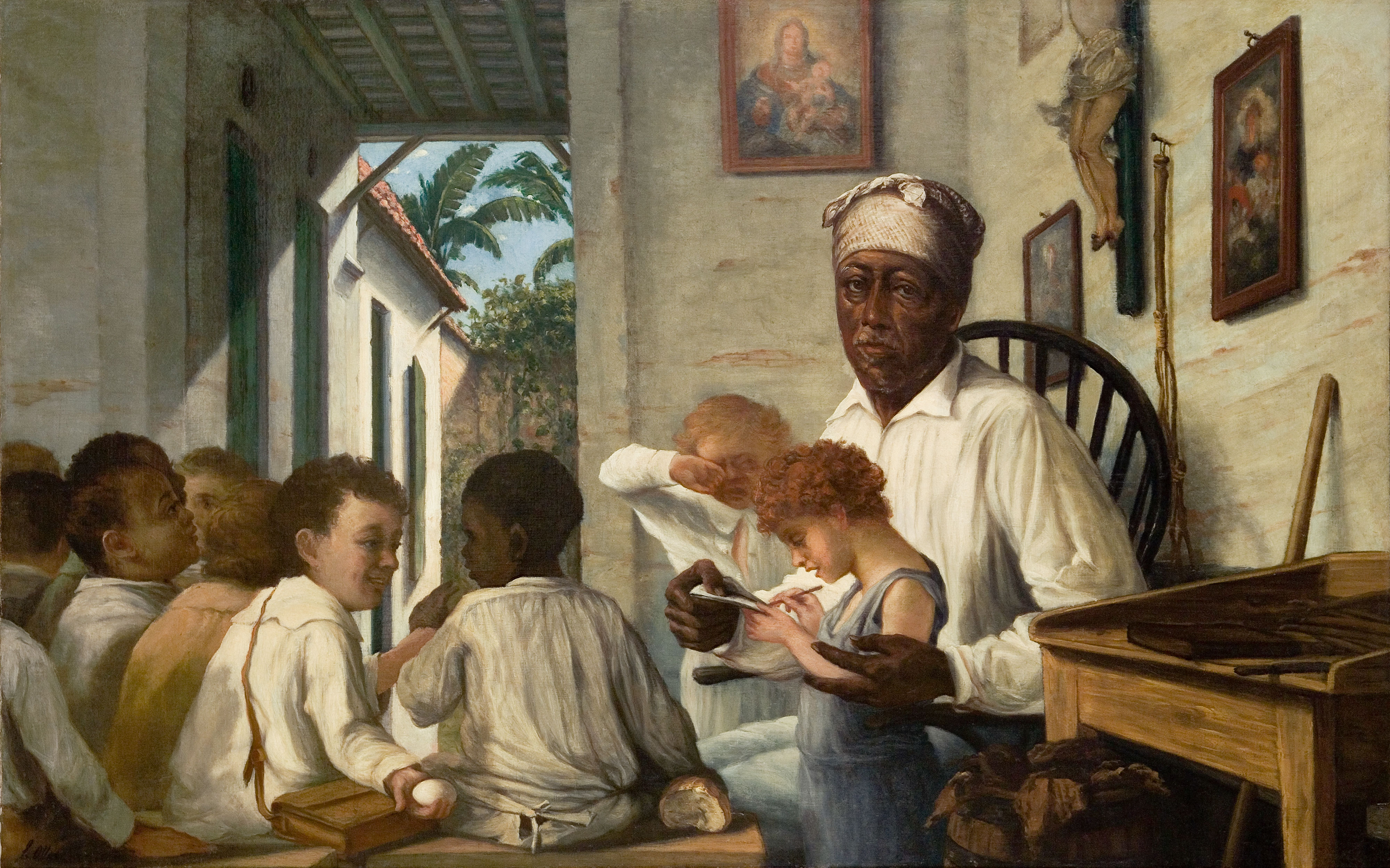
La Escuela del Maestro Rafael Cordero (1890–1892) Ateneo Puertorriqueño

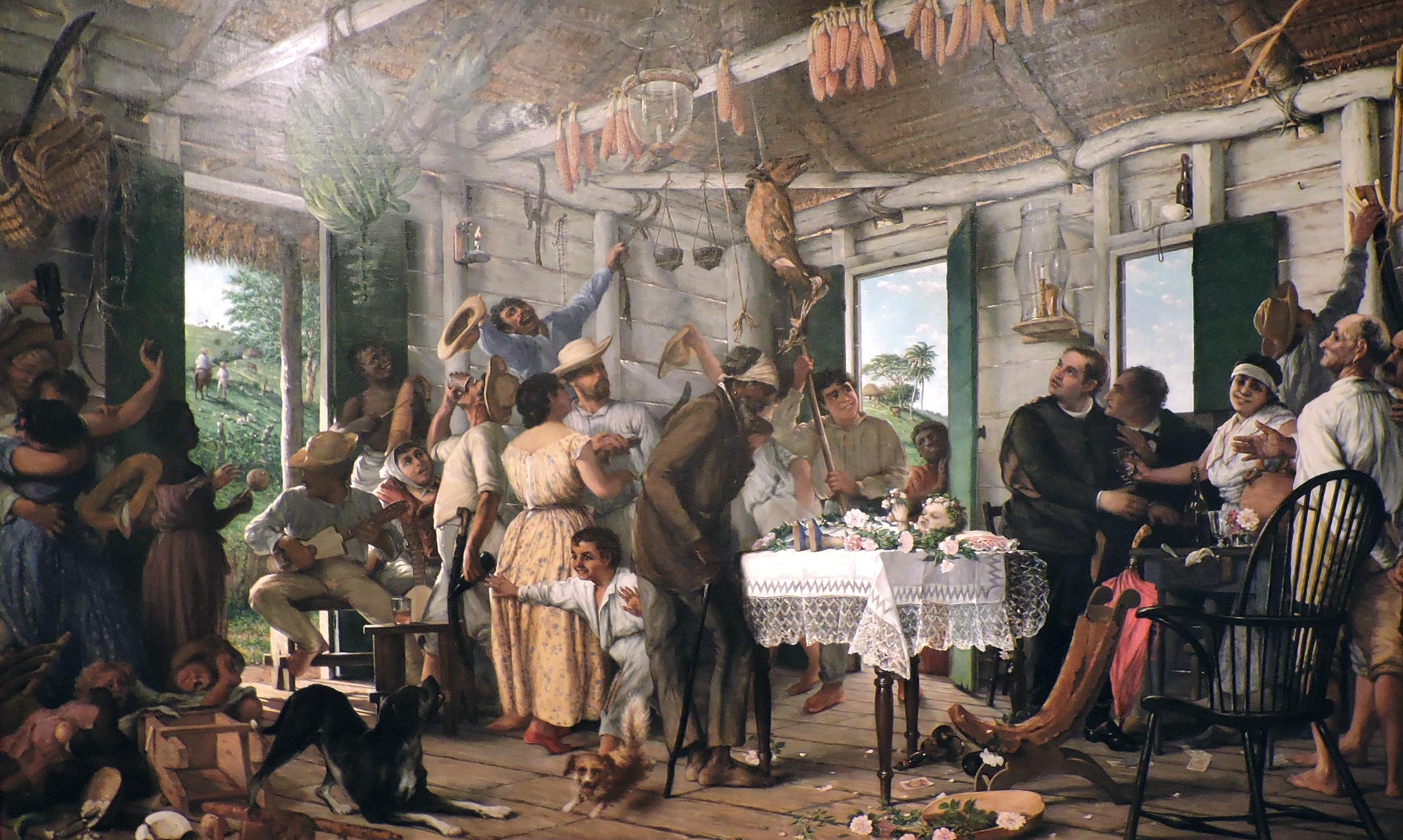
El Velorio (1893) Museum of the UPR

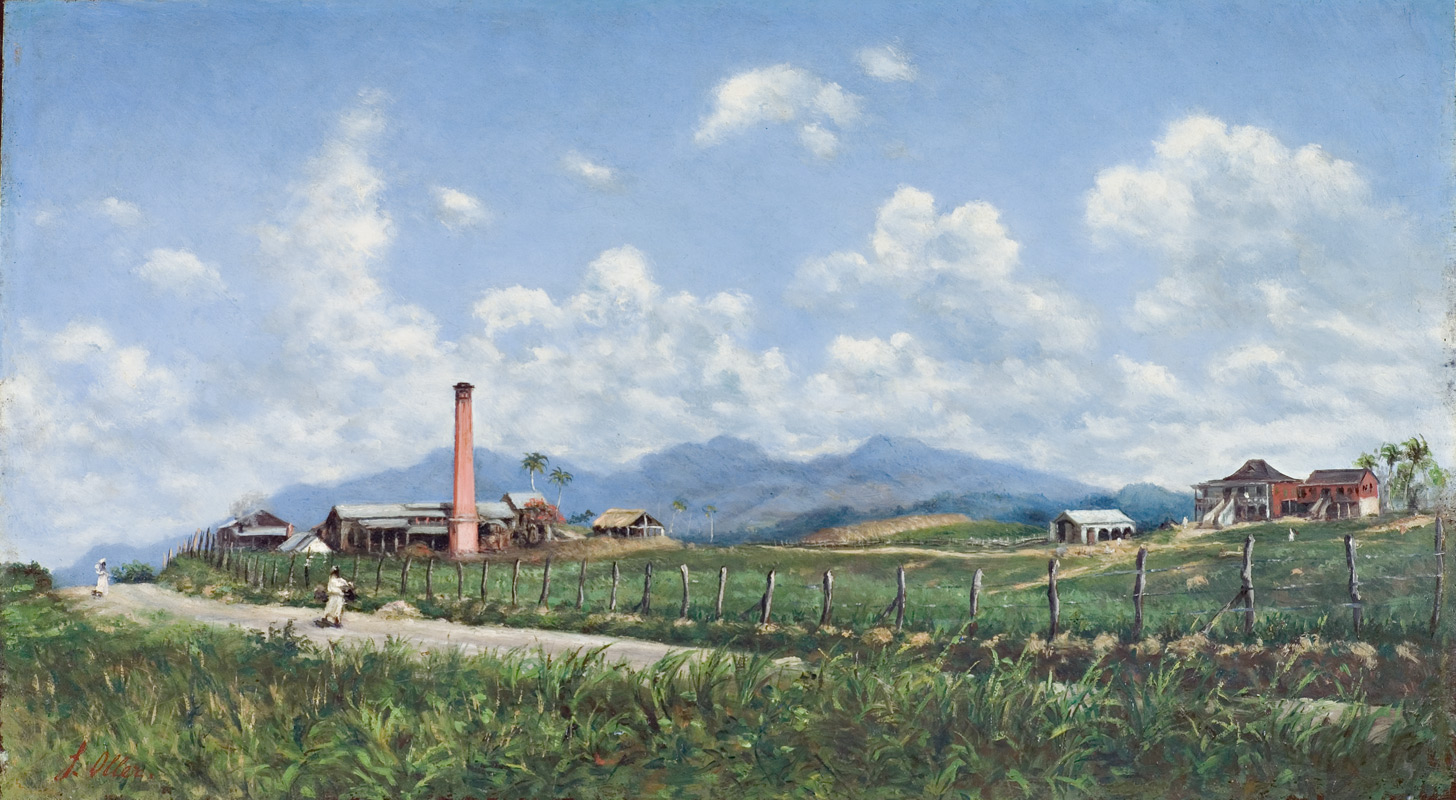
Hacienda Aurora (1898) Museo de Arte de Ponce

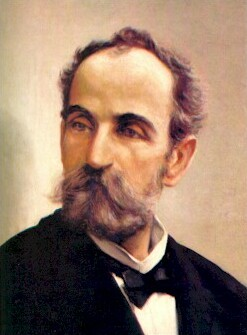
Portrait of Eugenio María de Hostos (1903) Museum of the UPR

== See also ==
- List of Puerto Ricans — Painters and sculptors
