= Museum of History, Anthropology and Art of the University of Puerto Rico =

Coordinates: 18°24′15″N 66°03′05″W

- Museo de Historia, Antropología y Arte de la Universidad de Puerto Rico
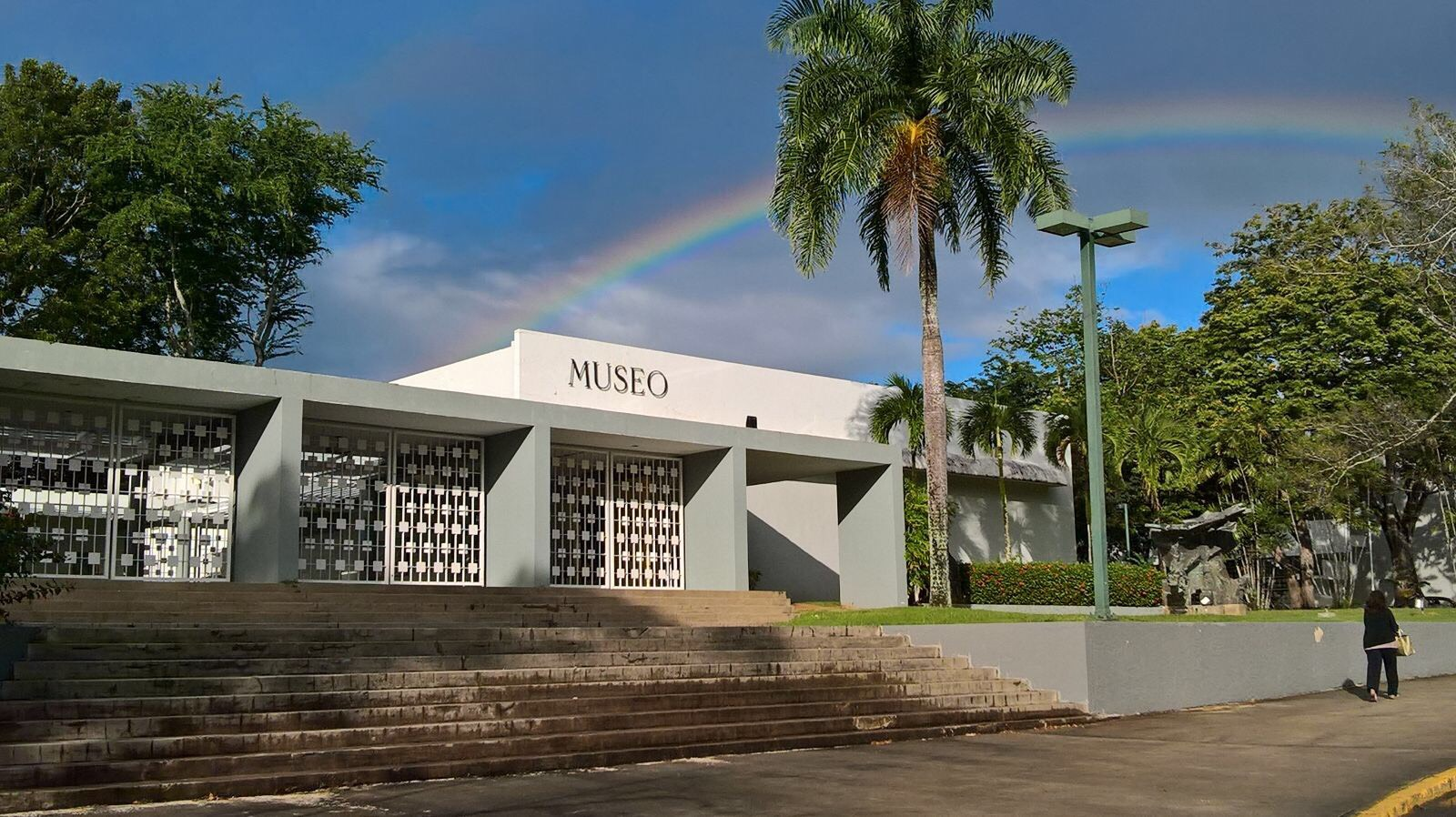
- Former name: Museo Juan Ponce de León
- Location: University of Puerto Rico, Río Piedras Campus, Río Piedras, San Juan, Puerto Rico
- Type: Anthropology and art museum
- Architect: Henry Klumb
- Website: https://www.uprrp.edu/tag/museo-de-arte-upr/

The Museum of History, Anthropology and Art of the University of Puerto Rico (Spanish: Museo de Historia, Antropología y Arte de la Universidad de Puerto Rico) — often shortened to Museum of the UPR (Museo de la UPR) or MHAA — is a university museum dedicated to anthropology, archaeology and the history of art of Puerto Rico located on the grounds of the University of Puerto Rico, Río Piedras Campus. Officially dating to 1951, this museum is the oldest in Puerto Rico with its first collection being even older dating to 1914, donated by then Resident Commissioner Federico Degetau.

== History ==
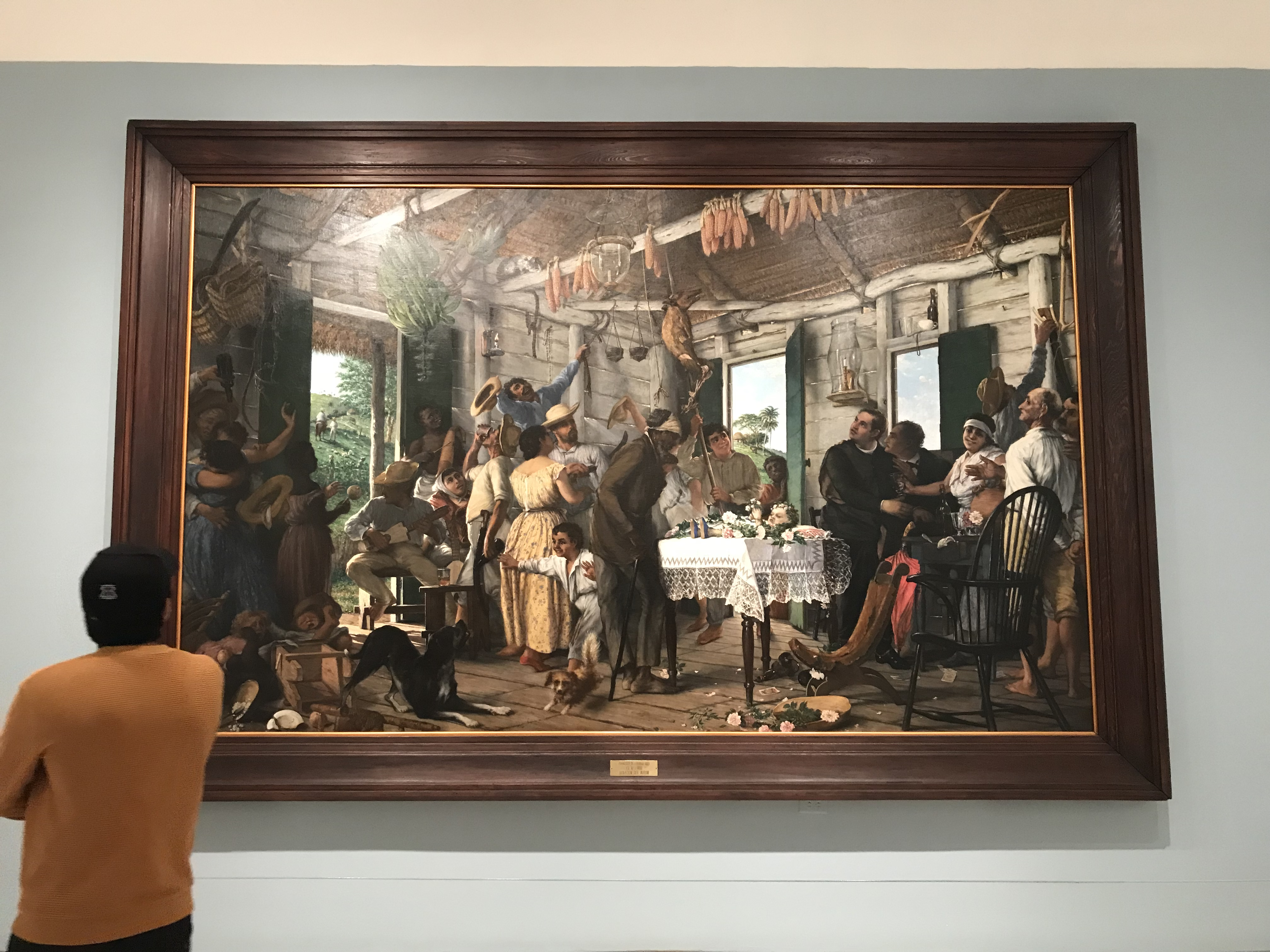
Francisco Oller's El Velorio, has been on display in different locales at the University of Puerto Rico since 1915

Although MHAA did not officially open to the public until 1951, its first collection dates to 1914, which consisted of Federico Degetau's personal art collection. The museum's most famous piece of Puerto Rican art, Francisco Oller's El Velorio (1893), was acquired the following year in 1915. Prior to this, El Velorio was displayed at the Insular Library of Puerto Rico in Old San Juan.

Historian and professor Rafael W. Ramírez de Arellano established the museum's first iteration under the name of Museo Juan Ponce de León. This museum was dedicated to archaeology and the history of Puerto Rico, and it contained important artifacts intended to showcase the history of the Island to history students. The university administration officially recognized this institution in 1943, and Dr. Ricardo Alegría was named its first director in 1947. The Puerto Rican government officially recognized the museum as a public institution in 1951, making it the first official museum in Puerto Rico.

The Museum is one of the five museum institutions managed by the University of Puerto Rico, the other four being the Dr. Pío López Martínez Museum (UPR Cayey), the Roig House Museum (UPR Humacao), the Sculpture Garden at the University of Puerto Rico Botanical Garden., and the Museo de Arte (MUSA) of the Recinto Universitario de Mayagüez (University of Puerto Rico at Mayagüez).

=== Museum building ===
The Museum's collection was moved to its current building in 1959. The building was designed by prominent German architect Henry Klumb, who also designed other buildings on campus such as the Student Center, the José M. Lázaro General Library, the UPR Law School Building and the Campus Faculty Center.

== Collections ==
The Museum's collection of Puerto Rican and Antillean archaeology is one of the most comprehensive in the Caribbean. The Museum collections include paintings, drawings, sculptures, philately, historic documents, numismatics and ethnographic objects. It also houses a specialized, comprehensive archive of Puerto Rican art.

Museum collection

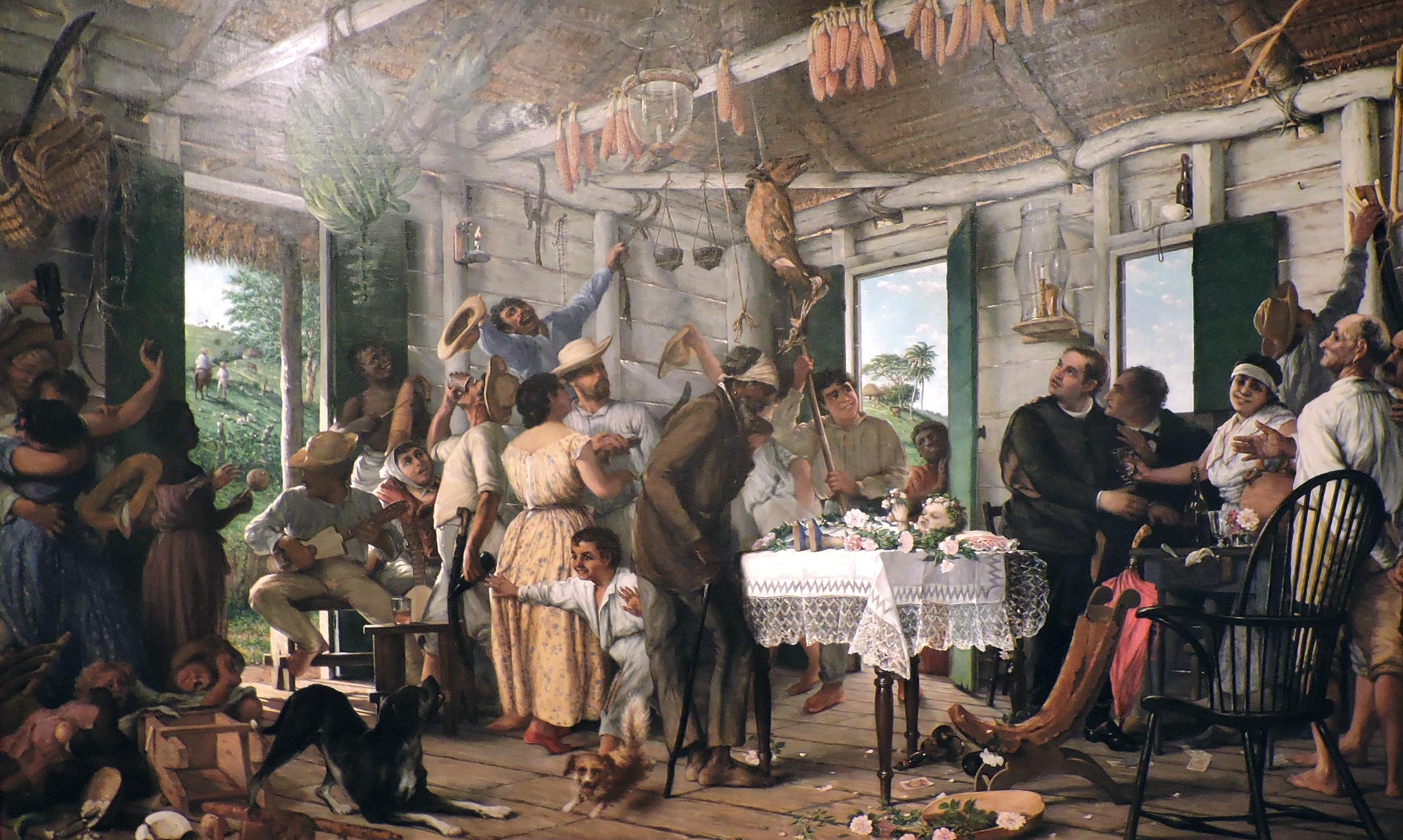
El Velorio; by Francisco Oller; 1893

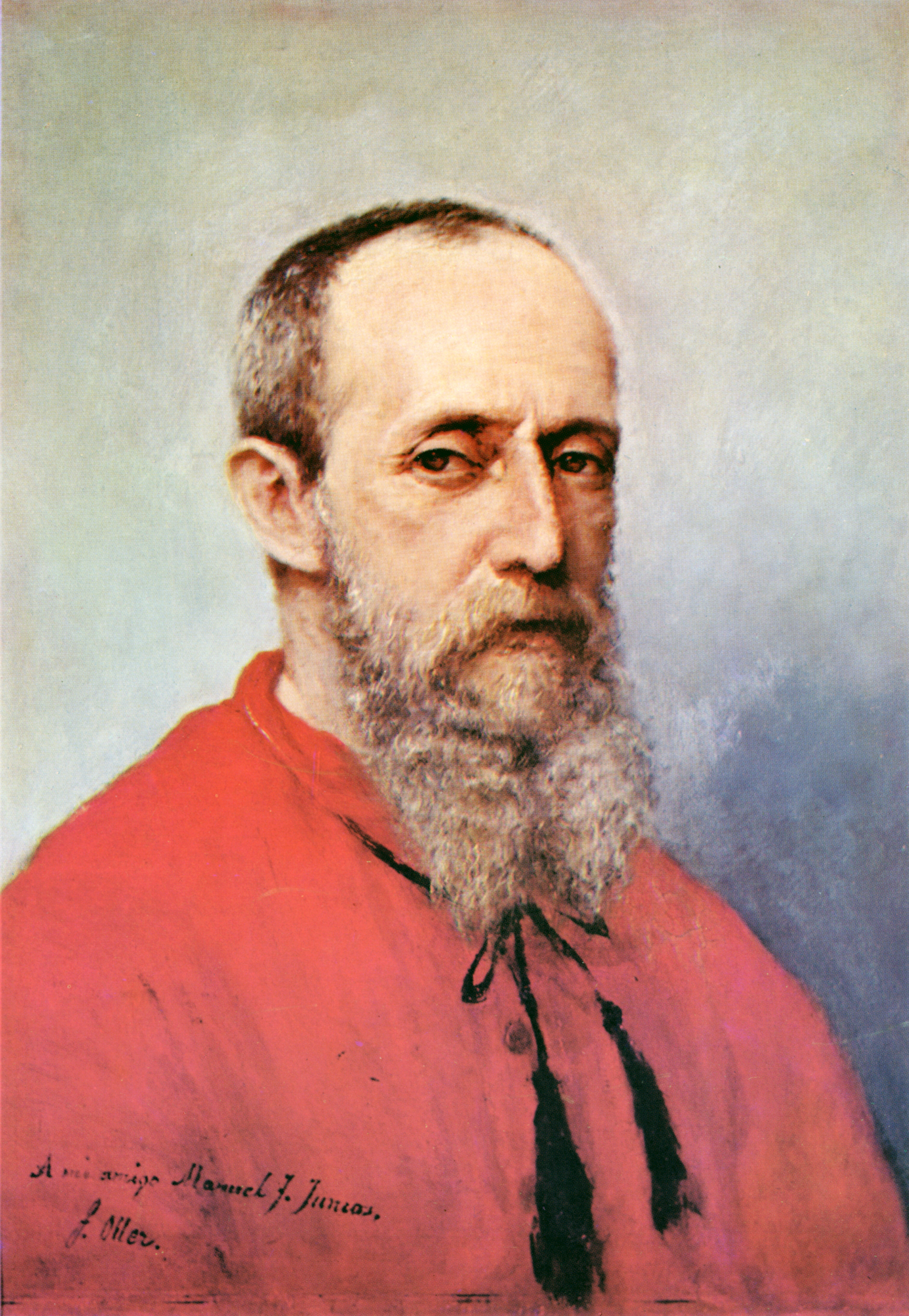
Self-portrait; by Francisco Oller; circa 1892

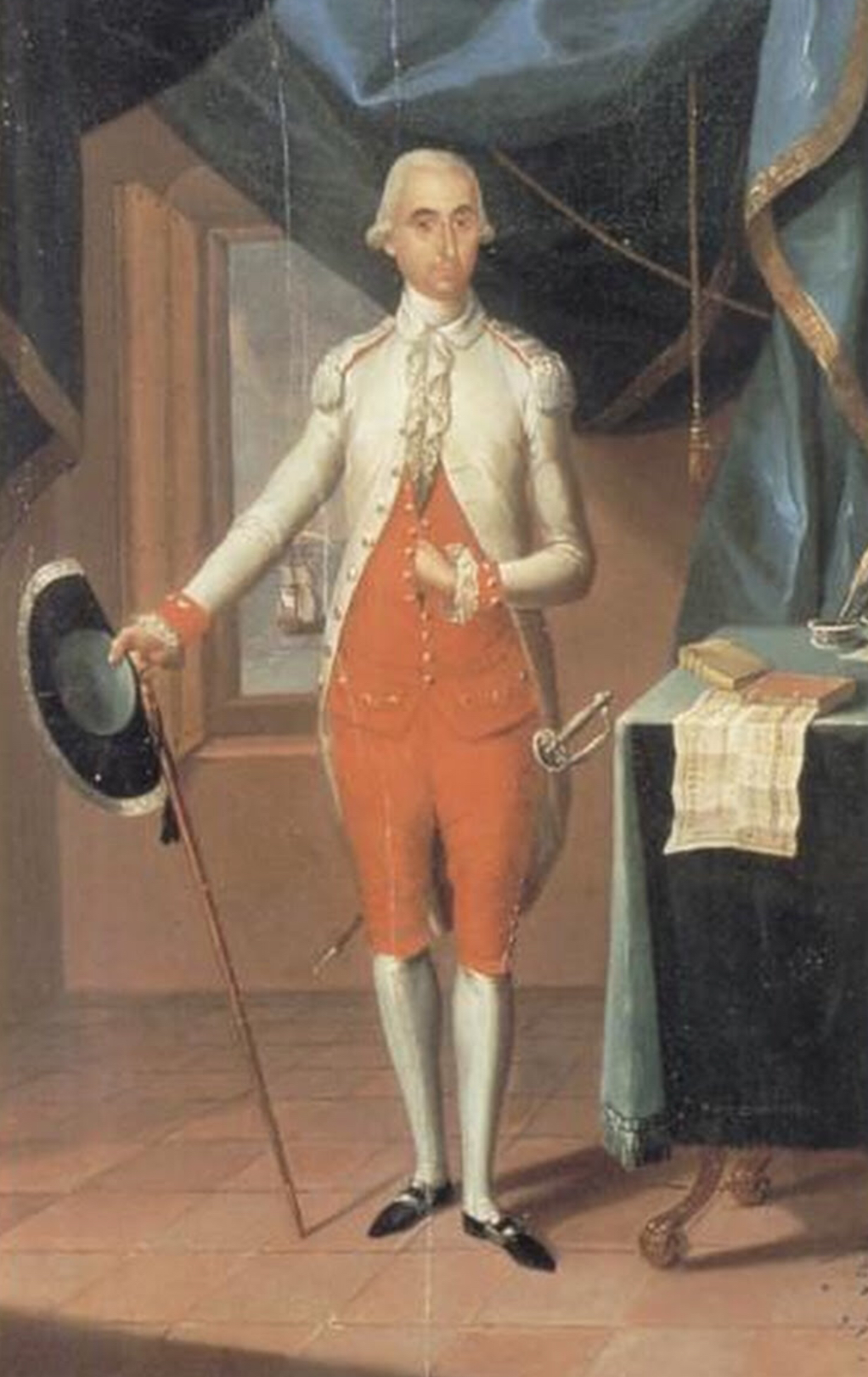
José Dufresne; by José Campeche; 1782

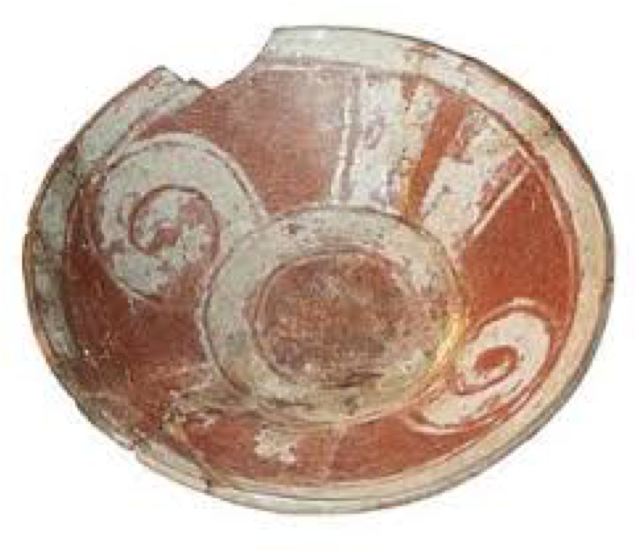
Saladoid culture ceramic from the Hacienda Grande archaeological site in Loíza; 100 BCE - 600 AD

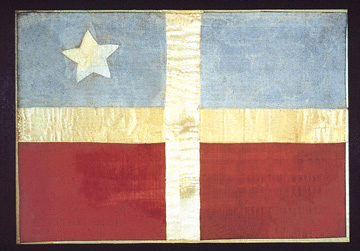
A revolutionary flag of Lares from the Lares Revolt of 1868.

== Programs and activities ==
The Museum offers exhibitions, guided tours, art workshops, conferences, forums, and concerts.
