= El Velorio =

1893 painting by Francisco Oller

- The Wake (English)
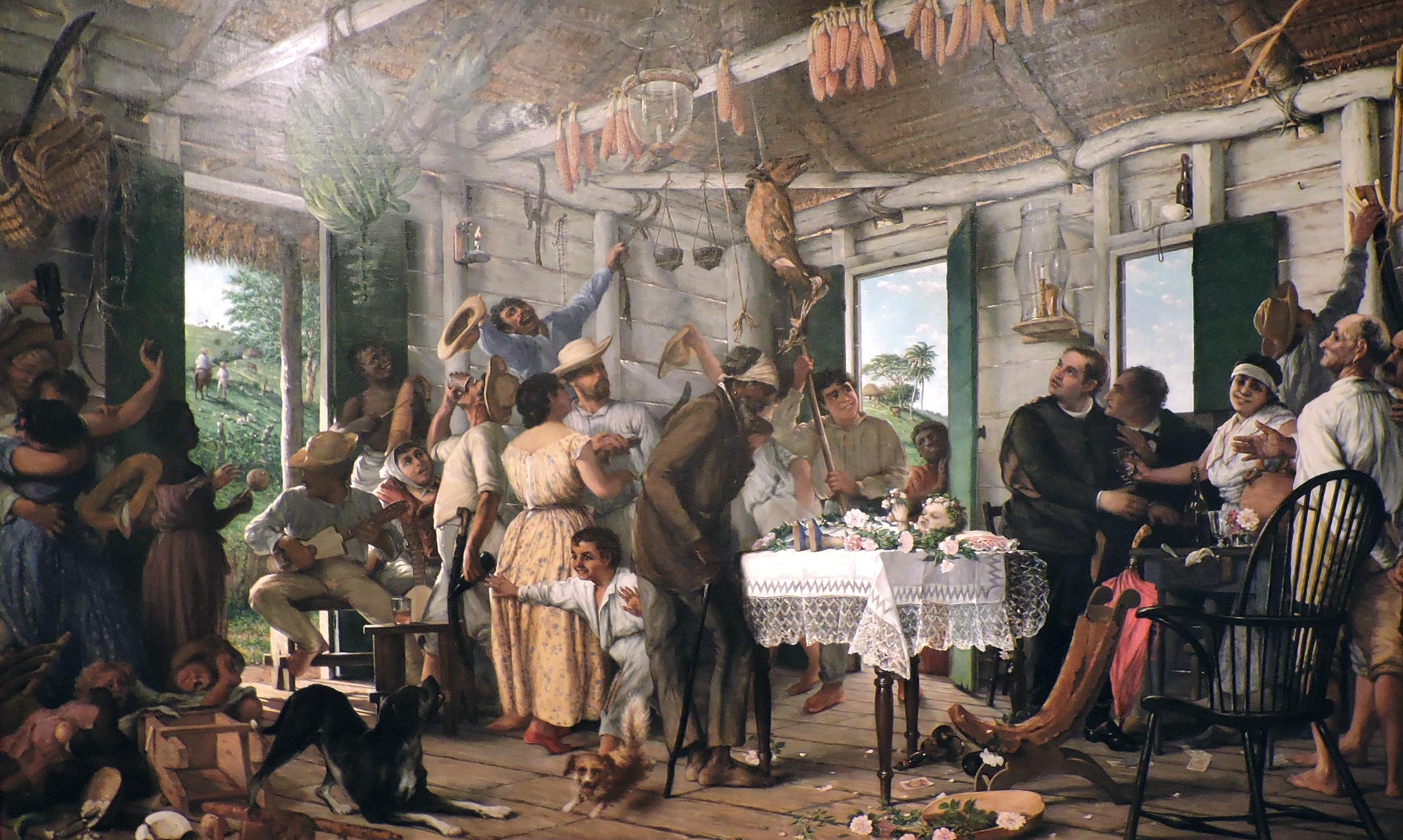
- "El Velorio" - 'The Wake' (1893)
- Artist: Francisco Oller
- Year: 1893
- Dimensions: 240 cm × 400 cm (96 in × 156 in)
- Location: Museum of Art, History, and Anthropology of the UPR, San Juan

El Velorio (Spanish for "The Wake") is an 1893 10-by-15-foot oil painting by Puerto Rican Impressionist painter Francisco Oller depicting a traditional wake for a child. This painting is considered one of the most important pieces in the art history of Puerto Rico and is therefore considered a national treasure. It is permanently exhibited at the Museum of History, Anthropology and Art of the University of Puerto Rico, Río Piedras Campus.

== Title and subject ==
El Velorio depicts a traditional 19th-century baquiné or velorio del angelito ("wake of a little angel"), a specific type of wake with origins in Afro-Puerto Rican culture that was celebrated by jibaros and other countrymen as funerary celebrations for the death of a child. This practice originates in the syncretic Catholic and folk belief that the death of an innocent baptized child results in their automatic ascension and entrance into Heaven and that the occasion is therefore a cause not only for remembrance but for celebration. The baquiné in this portrait depicts the deceased child as a focal point dressed in white and adorned with flowers, lying on a table at the center of a traditional countryside house. The iconography of the child, reminiscent of a Christ Child, symbolizes his purity and innocence but also presents a lighter theme that separates the painting into two visual contrasts: one lighter in colors that depicts scenes of joy and celebration with food and music, and another with darker colors and shadows that depicts not only the sorrow of the child's parents but also a chaotic scene of a priest trying to perform wake rites while dogs are running around. This exemplifies the everyday clash between life and death, and between celebration and suffering, common in the life of poor countrymen in 19th-century Puerto Rico. The scene is intentionally portrayed as a judgmental satire, with Francisco Oller himself describing the scene as “an orgy of brutish appetites under the guise of gross superstition."

== History ==
Francisco Oller, considered the only Latin American exponent of French Impressionism, was particularly interested in the social causes of the 19th-century everyday Puerto Rican men. As such he dedicated much attention to traditional scenes of Puerto Rican life in his paintings at the time. He began work on the painting in 1891 in Hacienda Santa Bárbara, a sugarcane plantation in Carolina that was owned by the Elzaburu family. José and Pedro Elzaburu served as models to the priest and sacristan, respectively; their housekeeper served as a model for the child's mother. He also used many of the farm workers and their families as models for the characters in the painting.

El Velorio was somewhat unpopular when it was first showcased in Puerto Rico, during the 1893 Exposition of Puerto Rico in San Juan, as it was perceived as a negative and vulgar representation of the superstitious rural Puerto Rican life. It was however popular among the public, with educator and chronicler Alejandro Infiesta writing that many who saw it at the time exclaimed to have family or know people who resembled the individuals depicted in the painting. The piece was also well received in France when it was first exposed at the Paris Salon in 1895 where it was described as a successful depiction of "tropical Impressionism".

The painting was owned by the Insular Library of Puerto Rico until 1915 when it was acquired by the University of Puerto Rico. El Velorio was instrumental in the development of the Museum of the University of Puerto Rico, the first of its kind in Puerto Rico and the first purpose-built museum in the island. The painting can still be seen there today.

== Legacy ==
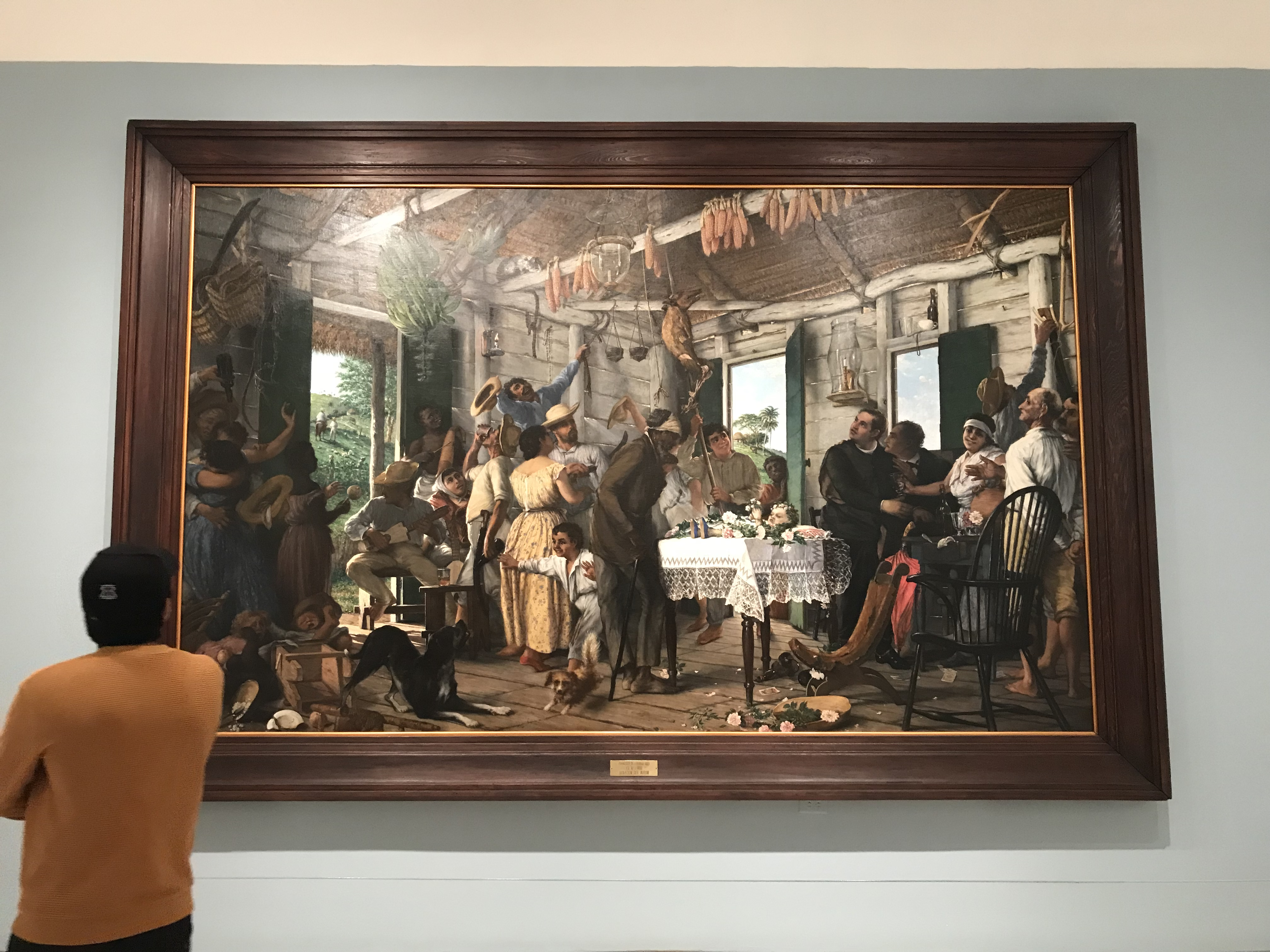
El Velorio at the UPR-RP art museum in 2022.

El Velorio is considered today to be Francisco Oller's masterpiece, a Puerto Rican national treasure and the foremost example of Impressionism in Latin America. El Velorio has inspired numerous reinterpretations. For example, El Velorio de Oller en Nueva York (1974) by Jorge Soto Sánchez, now showcased at the Smithsonian American Art Museum, depicts a similar scene to the original piece but incorporating visual elements of Santeria and the culture of the Puerto Rican diaspora in New York City. Artist Rafael Trelles also created a special exhibition at the Museum of Art of Puerto Rico dedicated to Francisco Oller's masterpiece with Visitas a “El velorio” (Visits to El Velorio) (1991), a mixed media contemporary art installation.

== See also ==
- Puerto Rican art
