= Alejandro Tapia y Rivera =

Puerto Rican poet

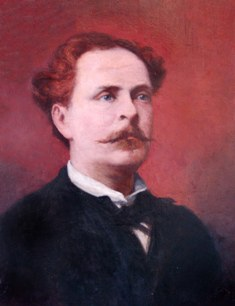
- Alejandro Tapia y Rivera
- Born: November 12, 1826; San Juan, Captaincy General of Puerto Rico
- Died: July 19, 1882 (aged 55); San Juan, Captaincy General of Puerto Rico
- Occupations: playwright, poet, writer, essayist

Alejandro Tapia y Rivera (November 12, 1826 – July 19, 1882) was a Puerto Rican poet, playwright, essayist and writer. Tapia is considered to be the father of Puerto Rican literature and as the person who has contributed the most to the cultural advancement of Puerto Rico's literature. In addition to his writing, he was also an abolitionist and a women's rights advocate.

== Early years ==
Tapia was born in San Juan, Puerto Rico to Alejandro de Tapia from Murcia, Spain and Catalina de Rivera Sánchez from Arecibo. Both were descended from Spanish nobility. There he received his primary education under the guidance of the educator Rafael Cordero while studying his primary years in a school on Luna Street (Calle Luna) in Old San Juan, who was an early inspiration in his life. There he met his lifelong friend José Julián Acosta. Acosta and Roman Baldorioty de Castro were selected to represent Puerto Rico in Madrid in the occasion of the crowning of Alfonso, the son of Queen Isabella, as the next King of Spain and the trio traveled to Spain on 6 June 1869. Tapia accompanied his friend Acosta during this trip to Spain, and while in Spain, he met Rosario Diaz y Espiau and they married that year. The couple traveled to Puerto Rico and settled in Ponce that same year. They had a daughter, Catalina (Katie) Tapia Diaz, who married Albert Edward Lee, from Ponce but residing in San Juan, on 7 December 1874. They had a daughter, Consuelo Lee Tapia who married Juan Antonio Corretjer. As such, Corretjer was Tapia's grandson in law.

Tapia worked for the State Department. A Spanish Army artillery officer challenged him to a duel when Tapia refused to yield the sidewalk to him, a challenge which he accepted; as a result, Tapia suffered a non-lethal injury in the arm and subsequently exiled to Spain, where he remained with his father for a period of time.

== Literary career ==
While in Spain he completed his studies in literature in Madrid (1850–1852) and joined the Society of the Recollection of Historical Documents Relating to Puerto Rico (Sociedad Recolectora de Documentos Históricos de San Juan Bautista de Puerto Rico). Tapia filed and organized important 16th and 17th century documents of Puerto Rico. He published his first important work called The Historical Library of Puerto Rico (Biblioteca Histórica de Puerto Rico) relating to those documents and his findings on them.

In 1852, the Spanish-appointed governor of Puerto Rico, Fernando de Norzagaray, pardoned Tapia and returned to Puerto Rico, establishing his residence in the city of Ponce on the southern coast of the island. He was a member of the Progressive Action Political Party. Among his cultural positions was his membership in the Puerto Rican Intellectual Protective Society. He was also the director of the Youth Museum in Ponce and the founder and first president of the Ateneo Puertorriqueño. He moved from Ponce to San Juan around 1874, after founding, in Ponce, Puerto Rico's first Gabinete de Lectura in 1870. The Gabinete de Lectura was the precursor of the Ponce Municipal Library.

== Death ==
Alejandro Tapia y Rivera died in the city of San Juan, Puerto Rico, on July 19, 1882, while giving a conference at the Ateneo Puertorriqueño.

== Written works ==
- El heliotropo (1848)
- The Palm of the Chief (1852)
- Guarionex (libretto, premiered in 1854)
- José Campeche: biography by Alejandro Tapia y Rivera (1854)
- Roberto D'Evreux (1856)
- Bernardo de Palyssy o El heroísmo del trabajo (1857)
- La antigua sirena (1862)
- La cuarterona (1867)
- Camoens (Alejandro Tapia y Rivera) (1868)
- Póstumo el transmigrado (1872)
- Vasco Núñez de Balboa: biography by Alejandro Tapia y Rivera (1872)
- Ramón Power: biography by Alejandro Tapia y Rivera (1873)
- La leyenda de los veinte años (1874)
- La Sataniada (1874)
- Roberto Cofresí (1876)
- Misceláneas de Alejandro Tapia y Rivera (1880)
- Póstumo el envirginado (1882)
- Mis memorias por Alejandro Tapia y Rivera

== Awards ==
Among Tapia's many awards and honours were:

- The Medal of the Royal Knight (Medalla de la Orden del Caballero Real) and
- The Royal and Distinguished Order of Carlos III from Spain.

== Posthumous honors ==
His memory has been honoured in Puerto Rico. There are schools and avenues named after Tapia. The Teatro Tapia in Old San Juan, the Island's premier dramatic stage, is also named after him. In July 2008, Roberto Ramos Perea, general director of the Archivo Nacional de Teatro y Cine del Ateneo Puertorriqueño, an archive dedicated to conserve documents and memorabilia from the theatre industry in Puerto Rico, announced that a documentary covering Tapia y Rivera's life is planned. The filmation is part of a series of events honoring his life, titled Jornadas en Honor y Memoria de Alejandro Tapia y Rivera.

== See also ==
- List of Puerto Rican writers
- List of Puerto Ricans
- Puerto Rican literature
