= List of California Institute of the Arts people =

This is a list of notable alumni and faculty of the California Institute of the Arts.

== School of Art ==
=== Alumni ===
- Angus Andrew
- B+
- Judie Bamber
- Richard Barnbrook
- Sadie Barnette
- Julie Becker (BFA, MFA)
- Cindy Bernard
- Ashley Bickerton
- Jeremy Blake (MFA 95, Art)
- Nayland Blake (MFA 84, Art)
- Ross Bleckner (MFA 73, Art)
- Barbara Bloom (BFA 72, Art)
- John S. Boskovich (MFA, Art)
- Andrea Bowers
- Mark Bradford
- Troy Brauntuch
- Sherry Brody
- Julia Brown
- Laurie Halsey Brown
- Krista Buecking (MFA 2012, Art)
- John Burtle
- Barbara Carrasco
- John J. Casbarian (MFA, Design)
- James Casebere (MFA 79, Art)
- Cassils (MFA 2002, Art)
- Audrey Chan
- James Chinlund (BFA 94, Art)
- Nancy Chunn
- Jill Ciment
- Timothy Clark
- Madelin Coit
- Anne Collier (BFA 93)
- Fiona Connor
- Bernard Cooper
- Sofia Coppola (92, Photography and Media)
- Beatriz Cortez
- Meg Cranston
- Denise Gonzales Crisp
- Zoe Crosher
- Dorit Cypis
- Danielle Dean (MFA 2012)
- Karla Diaz (MFA 2004)
- Richard K. Diran (1972, painting)
- Tomory Dodge
- Roy Dowell
- Zackary Drucker
- John Duncan
- Sam Durant (MFA 91, Art)
- Elana Dykewomon
- Mark Edward
- Kenneth Feingold
- Christina Fernandez
- Eric Fischl (BFA 72, Art)
- Victoria Fu (MFA 05, Art)
- Mario García Torres (MFA 2005)
- Jill Giegerich
- Liz Glynn (MFA 08)
- Jack Goldstein
- Ramiro Gomez
- Guillermo Gomez-Peña (BFA 81, MFA 83)
- Sharon Grace (1972)
- Todd Gray (MFA 89, Photography and Media)
- Tony Greene
- Shane Guffogg
- Kira Lynn Harris
- Lyle Ashton Harris
- Asher Hartman
- Kim Hastreiter
- Richard Hawkins (MFA 88)
- Johanna Hedva
- Mary Beth Heffernan
- Heather Henson
- Kenyatta A.C. Hinkle
- Channa Horwitz
- Doug Ischar (BFA 87)
- Jim Isermann
- Michael Jang
- Larry Johnson
- Michael Adam Kandel
- Johnnie Jungleguts (BFA 12, Art)
- Young Kakit
- Mike Kelley (MFA 78, Art)
- Robert Glenn Ketchum (MFA 73, Photography and Media)
- Susan Kinsolving
- Tom Knechtel (BFA 74, MFA 76, Art)
- Alice Könitz
- Suzanne Lacy (MFA '73)
- Alice Lang
- James Lapine
- Jonathan Lasker
- Elad Lassry
- Karen LeCocq
- Jenny Lens
- Laida Lertxundi
- Robert Levine
- Jen Liu
- Michael Mandiberg (MFA 03, Photography and Media)
- Elana Mann
- Daniel Joseph Martinez (BFA 79, Photography and Media)
- Kent Matsuoka
- Rita McBride (MFA 87)
- Rodney McMillian (MFA 02, Art)
- Josephine Meckseper (MFA 92)
- Douglas Melini
- John Miller (MFA 79, Art)
- Adia Millett
- Susan Mogul
- Noreen Morioka
- Dwayne Moser (MFA 2001)
- Andy Moses
- Farhad Moshiri
- Carter Mull
- Dave Muller (MFA 1993)
- Matt Mullican
- Yurie Nagashima
- Ray Navarro
- Tuan Andrew Nguyen (MFA 2004)
- Kali Nikitas (MFA 90, Graphic Design)
- Stephen Nowlin
- Catherine Opie (MFA 88, Photography and Media)
- Julie Orser (MFA, 05, Art)
- Rubén Ortiz-Torres (MFA 92, Art)
- Tony Oursler (BFA 79, Art)
- Jan Oxenberg
- Esteban Ramón Pérez
- Ariel Pink
- Lari Pittman (MFA 76)
- Michael Polish (BFA 92, Art)
- Gala Porras-Kim (MFA 09, Art)
- Monique Prieto (BFA and MFA, Art)
- Stephen Prina
- Joe Ray (BFA 73, Art)
- Ry Rocklen
- Jaklin Romine (MFA 2017)
- Marina Rosenfeld
- G. Samantha Rosenthal
- Leo Rubinfien (BFA 1974, Photography)
- Christoph Ruckhäberle
- Shizu Saldamando (MFA 2005)
- David Salle (BFA 73, MFA 75, Art)
- Louise Sandhaus (MFA 94, Graphic Design)
- Adrian Saxe
- Pieter Schoolwerth(BFA 94)
- Mira Schor (MFA 73)
- Ilene Segalove
- Stephen Selkowitz (Environmental Design, MFA 72)
- Jim Shaw
- Nikita Shokhov
- Susan Silas
- Artur Silva
- Gary Simmons
- Patrice Stellest
- Haruko Tanaka
- Henry Taylor
- Valerie Tevere (MFA, 97)
- Clarissa Tossin
- Ayzay Ukwuoma
- Kaari Upson
- Klaus vom Bruch
- Carrie Mae Weems (BFA 81, Photography and Media)
- James Welling (BFA 72, MFA 74, Photography and Media)
- Dirk Westphal
- Richard Ray Whitman
- John Wiese
- Faith Wilding
- Christopher Williams
- Megan Williams (B.F.A., 1978)
- Marisa Williamson
- Audrey Wollen
- B. Wurtz
- Rio Yañez
- Nancy Youdelman
- Tim Zuck

=== Faculty ===
- Vito Acconci
- Laurie Anderson
- Richard Artschwager
- Michael Asher
- David Askevold
- John Baldessari
- Lynda Benglis
- Kathryn Bigelow
- Natalie Bookchin
- Jonathan Borofsky
- Paul Brach
- Judy Chicago
- Robert H. Cumming
- Louis Danziger
- Sheila Levrant de Bretteville
- Harry Dodge
- Lecia Dole-Recio
- Richard Farson
- Anoka Faruqee
- Ed Fella
- Gerald Ferguson
- Karen Finley
- Judy Fiskin
- Simone Forti
- Anthony Friedkin
- Charles Gaines
- Harry Gamboa, Jr.
- Jeremy Gilbert-Rolfe
- Keith Godard
- April Greiman
- Fritz Haeg
- Paula Harper
- Douglas Huebler
- Ashley Hunt
- Tom Jennings
- Matsumi Kanemitsu
- Allan Kaprow
- Jeffery Keedy
- Martin Kersels
- Alison Knowles
- Barbara Kruger
- Thomas Lawson
- Joe Lewis
- Roy Lichtenstein
- Sharon Lockhart
- Catherine Lord
- Laurie Haycock Makela
- John Mandel
- Paul McCarthy
- Bruce Nauman
- Jayme Odgers
- Nam June Paik
- Victor Papanek
- Chuck Pelly
- Ave Pildas
- Peter Jon Pearce
- Judy Pfaff
- Ulrike Rosenbach
- Susan Rothenberg
- Miriam Schapiro
- Alan Schoen
- Allan Sekula
- Pat Steir
- Wolfgang Stoerchle
- Gail Swanlund
- Martine Syms
- Julie Tolentino
- Shirley Tse
- John Van Hamersveld
- Peter Van Riper
- Stan Vanderbeek
- Lorraine Wild
- Emmett Williams
- Millie Wilson
- Krzysztof Wodiczko
- Emerson Woelffer

== School of Critical Studies ==
=== Alumni ===
- Andrew Berardini (MFA 06)
- Colin Dickey (MFA 00)
- Ken Ehrlich (MFA 99)
- Amanda Yates Garcia (MFA 06)
- Kenyatta A.C. Hinkle (MFA 13)
- Henry Hoke (MFA 11)
- Douglas Kearney (MFA 04)
- Soo Kim (MFA 95)
- Grace Krilanovich (MFA 05)
- Eric Lindley, aka Careful (MFA 08)
- Karl Montevirgen (MFA 00)
- Dennis Phillips
- Allie Rowbottom (MFA 11)
- Stephen van Dyck (MFA 09)

=== Faculty ===
- Bruce Bauman
- Dodie Bellamy
- Susie Bright
- Sue-Ellen Case
- Robert Christgau
- Gabrielle Civil
- Sande Cohen
- Thomas E. Crow
- Steve Erickson
- Clayton Eshleman
- Brian Evenson
- María Irene Fornés
- Daniel Foss
- Carribean Fragoza
- Peter Gadol
- Paula Harper
- Mark Harris
- Dick Hebdige
- Dick Higgins
- Sikivu Hutchinson
- Norman M. Klein
- Max Kozloff
- Saul Landau
- Anthony McCann
- Deena Metzger
- Larry Miller
- Maggie Nelson
- Carl Oglesby
- Arlene Raven
- Janet Sarbanes
- Jeremy J. Shapiro
- Matthew Shenoda
- David St. John
- Maurice R. Stein
- Janet Sternburg
- Michael Stock
- Jalal Toufic
- Luisa Valenzuela
- Robert Walter
- John Willett
- Emmett Williams

== The Sharon Lund School of Dance ==
=== Alumni ===
- Thomas Jefferson Byrd
- Laganja Estranja
- Jacques Heim (MFA 91)
- Cris Horwang
- Alonzo King

=== Faculty ===
- Donald Byrd
- Colin Connor
- George de la Peña
- Charles Edmondson
- Irene Feigenheimer
- Bella Lewitzky
- Gene Marinaccio
- Donald McKayle
- Mia Čorak Slavenska
- Allegra Fuller Snyder
- Gus Solomons Jr.
- Rebecca Wright

== School of Film/Video ==
=== Alumni ===
- Andrew Ahn (Film Directing)
- Asitha Ameresekere (Film Directing)
- Steve F. Anderson (MFA '90, Film & Video)
- Steve J. Anderson (Character Animation)
- Bryan Andrews (Character Animation)
- Mark Andrews (BFA 93, Character Animation)
- Tony Anselmo (Character Animation)
- Wes Archer (Experimental Animation)
- David A. Armstrong
- Kelly Asbury (Character Animation)
- Jom Tob Azulay
- Chris Bailey (Character Animation)
- Kyle Balda (Character Animation)
- Steve Balderson (96, Film & Video)
- Tom Bancroft (Character Animation)
- Tony Bancroft (Character Animation)
- Adam Beckett (BFA 74, Experimental Animation)
- Nancy Beiman (Character Animation)
- Bruce Berman (73, Live Action)
- Tom Bertino (Animation)
- Anna Biller (Interschool, Film & Video, Art)
- Brad Bird (76, Character Animation)
- Kevin Bjorke
- Timothy Björklund (Experimental Animation)
- Robert Blalack (Experimental Animation)
- Kat Blaque (BFA 12, Character Animation)
- Joyce Borenstein (Experimental Animation)
- Colin Brady (Character Animation)
- Matt Braly (BFA 10, Film & Video)
- Ash Brannon (Character Animation)
- Patrick Brice (Film & Video)
- Q. Allan Brocka
- Bill Brown (MFA 97, Film & Video)
- Pete Browngardt (BFA 2000, Character Animation)
- Chris Buck (78, Character Animation)
- Tim Burton (79, Character Animation)
- James Caliri
- Cody Cameron
- Brenda Chapman (BFA 87, Character Animation)
- Yarrow Cheney
- Daniel Chong
- Peter Chung (81, Experimental Animation)
- Kerry Conran (Film & Video)
- Donovan Cook (92, Character Animation)
- Gabriel Cowan (Film Directing)
- Joel Crawford
- Larry Cuba (Experimental Animation)
- Jill Culton (Character Animation)
- Sean Daniel (BFA 73, Film & Video)
- David Daniels (Experimental Animation)
- Eric Darnell (MFA 90, Experimental Animation)
- Jeff DeGrandis
- Anthony DeRosa (Character Animation)
- Sue DiCicco (Character Animation)
- Kirby Dick (Film/Video)
- Mark Dindal (Character Animation)
- Pete Docter (BFA 90, Character Animation)
- Walt Dohrn
- Kate Dollenmayer (BFA 05 Film & Video)
- Kelman Duran
- Russ Edmonds (BFA 87, Character Animation)
- Ralph Eggleston (86, Character Animation)
- Rhys Ernst (MFA 2011)
- Rodney Evans (MFA 96, Film & Video)
- Lauren Faust (95, Character Animation)
- F. X. Feeney (Film & Video)
- Dylan Fergus (MFA 2013, Film Directing)
- Michael Fitzpatrick
- Steven Fonti
- David Frankel
- Thor Freudenthal
- Javier Fuentes-León
- Randy Fullmer (Character Animation)
- Dede Gardner
- Joaquin "Kino" Gil
- Benjamin Gluck
- Adam Samuel Goldman (MFA, Film & Video)
- Jason Goldwatch
- Stefan Gruber (Experimental Animation)
- Aurora Guerrero
- Sara Gunnarsdóttir
- Jon Gustafsson (Film Directing)
- Jorge R. Gutierrez (BFA 97, MFA 00, Experimental Animation)
- Bret Haaland
- Tanya Haden (Experimental Animation)
- Curt Hahn (BFA, Film & Video)
- Don Hall (BFA 95, Character Animation)
- Steve Hanft (Film & Video)
- Sammy Harkham
- Kenna Harris (Character Animation)
- Vashti Harrison
- Butch Hartman (BFA 87, Character Animation)
- Rick Heinrichs (79, Character Animation)
- Michael Hemschoot (Character Animation)
- Mark Henn (BFA 80, Character Animation)
- Isabel Herguera
- Hal Hickel (Experimental Animation, 82)
- Helen Hill (MFA 95, Experimental Animation)
- Stephen Hillenburg (MFA 92, Experimental Animation)
- Alex Hirsch (BFA 07, Character Animation)
- Eliza Hittman (MFA Directing)
- Savage Steve Holland (Experimental Animation)
- Carole Holliday
- Roger Holzberg (BFA 76)
- Chris Innis (MFA 91, Live Action/Film)
- David Irving
- Richard Isanove
- Rick Jacobson
- Bob Jahnke
- Richard Jefferies (BFA 78, Experimental Animation)
- Glen Keane (74, Experimental Animation)
- Gina Kim (MFA 99, Film & Video)
- Tran T. Kim-Trang
- Mark Tapio Kines (BFA 92, Experimental Animation)
- Mark Kirkland (BFA 78, Experimental Animation)
- David Kirkpatrick (BFA 74)
- Arlene Klasky (Experimental Animation)
- Jorgen Klubien (BFA, Character Animation)
- Bill Kopp (BFA, Character Animation)
- Alexis Krasilovsky
- Shawn Krause (94, Character Animation)
- Amy Kravitz (MFA 86, Experimental Animation)
- Cy Kuckenbaker (MFA 04, Film & Video)
- Nandita Kumar
- Chris Langdon
- Lorne Lanning (Character Animation)
- John Lasseter (BFA 79, Character Animation)
- Doug Lefler
- Eric Leiser (2005, Experimental Animation)
- Jay Lender
- Kristen Lepore (MFA 12, Experimental Animation)
- Kevin Lima (Character Animation)
- Tom Lin Shu-yu
- Matthew Luhn (Character Animation)
- James Mangold (BFA 85, Film & Video)
- Dinah Manoff
- Michael Marcantel (Experimental Animation)
- April March (one year, Character Animation)
- Clayton Morrow
- James Marsh
- Stu Maschwitz (Animation)
- Miwa Matreyek (MFA 07, Experimental Animation)
- Craig McCracken (92, Character Animation)
- Tom McGrath (BFA 92, Character Animation)
- Patrick McHale (Character Animation)
- Eon McKai (Film & Video)
- Alessandro Mercuri (MFA 00, Live Action)
- Chris Miller (Character Animation)
- Rusty Mills
- Rob Minkoff (83, Character Animation)
- Mike Mitchell
- Adrian Molina
- Laura Molina (Character Animation)
- Zac Moncrief (Character Animation)
- Rich Moore (Character Animation)
- Soudabeh Moradian (MFA 15, Film and Video)
- C. Scott Morse (Character Animation)
- Thom Mount (MFA 73, Live Action)
- M. David Mullen (MFA 91, Film & Video)
- Nirvan Mullick (Experimental Animation)
- Mike L. Murphy (Character Animation)
- John Musker (BFA, 79, Character Animation)
- Adam Muto (Character Animation)
- Daron Nefcy (Character Animation)
- Drew Neumann (BFA 82, Film & Video)
- Teddy Newton (Character Animation)
- Michael Nguyen (88, Character Animation)
- Sue C. Nichols
- Julien Nitzberg (Film Directing)
- Mark O'Hare (Character Animation)
- Atsuko Okatsuka (MFA 2015)
- Gregory Orr (Film & Video)
- Mark Osborne (BFA 92, Experimental Animation)
- Akosua Adoma Owusu
- Sergio Pablos
- Skyler Page
- Andrea Pallaoro
- Christine Panushka (MFA 83, Experimental Animation)
- Eric Patrick (MFA 97, Experimental Animation)
- Michael Patterson (Experimental Animation)
- Korky Paul (Experimental Animation)
- Michael Peraza
- Bob Persichetti (BFA 96, Character Animation)
- Nicholas Peterson (Experimental Animation)
- Jeff Pidgeon
- Leonardo Pirondi
- Michael Pressman
- Joanna Priestley (MFA 85, Experimental Animation)
- Luis Prieto
- Rubén Procopio
- Dave Pruiksma (Character Animation)
- Jory Prum
- Marco Simon Puccioni
- J. G. Quintel (BFA 05, Character Animation)
- Kevin Rafferty
- Joe Ranft (80, Character Animation)
- Jim Reardon (Character Animation)
- Jerry Rees (77, Character Animation)
- Rob Renzetti (Character Animation)
- Mike Rianda
- Jose Rivera
- Lou Romano (94, Character Animation)
- Simon Rouby
- Jeff Rowe
- Paul Rudish (Character Animation)
- Rajee Samarasinghe (Film & Video)
- Chris Sanders (Character Animation)
- Peter Sarkisian
- Mitch Schauer (Character Animation)
- Allison Schulnik (BFA 00, Experimental Animation)
- Gary Schwartz (Experimental Animation)
- Henry Selick (MFA 77, Experimental Animation)
- Madeline Sharafian (Character Animation)
- Maneesh Sharma
- Brian Sheesley (Character Animation)
- Lee Sheldon (MFA Film Directing)
- Bruce W. Smith (Character Animation)
- Peter Sohn (BFA 99, Character Animation)
- Aaron Springer (Character Animation)
- Anthony Stacchi (BFA 86, Character Animation)
- Andrew Stanton (BFA 87, Character Animation)
- Eric Stefani (91, Character Animation)
- Jennifer Steinkamp (Experimental Animation)
- Patrice Stellest (Experimental Animation)
- Robert Stromberg
- Steven Subotnick (BFA 84, MFA 86, Experimental Animation)
- Doug Sweetland (Character Animation)
- Rea Tajiri
- Shion Takeuchi
- Genndy Tartakovsky (92, Character Animation)
- Ann Telnaes (BFA 85, Character Animation)
- Paul Tibbitt (Character Animation)
- Bill Tiller (BFA 92, Character Animation)
- Shannon Tindle (99, Character Animation)
- Bill Tomlinson
- Donna Tracy (Experimental Animation)
- Josie Trinidad
- Gary Trousdale (82, Character Animation)
- Cynthia True (Character Animation)
- Naomi Uman
- Nassos Vakalis (Character Animation)
- Darrell Van Citters (BFA 76, Character Animation)
- Thurop Van Orman (Character Animation)
- Gregg Vanzo (Character Animation)
- Conrad Vernon (Character Animation)
- J.J. Villard (BFA 04, Character Animation)
- Pendleton Ward (BFA 05, Character Animation)
- Dave Wasson
- Dean Wellins (Character Animation)
- Stevie Wermers
- Erik Wiese
- Travis Wilkerson
- David Hildebrand Wilson (MFA 76, Experimental Animation)
- Kirk Wise (CRT 85, Character Animation)
- Ellen Woodbury (Experimental Animation)
- Fred Worden (Film & Video)
- Justin Wright
- Laurence Wright
- Eric Yahnker
- Chie Yamayoshi
- Niki Yang

=== Faculty ===
- Michael Almereyda
- Thom Andersen
- Dale Baer
- Jerry Beck
- James Benning
- Betzy Bromberg
- Nancy Buchanan
- Charles Burnett
- Ben Caldwell
- James Caliri
- Ciro Cappellari
- Johanna Demetrakas
- Gill Dennis
- Ed Emshwiller
- Jules Engel
- Maureen Furniss
- Juan Pablo González
- Jack Hannah
- Mark Jonathan Harris
- T. Hee
- Monte Hellman
- Peter Hutton
- Bill Jackson
- Mike Johnson
- Bob Kurtz
- Deborah LaVine
- Don Levy
- Joan Logue
- Alexander Mackendrick
- John Lee Mahin
- Nina Menkes
- E. Michael Mitchell
- William Moritz
- Robert Nelson
- Pat O'Neill
- Mark Osborne
- Rumen Petkov
- Ernest Pintoff
- Suzan Pitt
- Jon Reiss
- Terry Sanders
- George Scribner
- Janice Tanaka
- Bill Viola
- Billy Woodberry
- Gene Youngblood

== The Herb Alpert School of Music ==
=== Alumni ===
- John Luther Adams (BFA 73)
- Ralph Alessi (BFA 87, MFA 90)
- Francis Awe
- Ryan Bancroft (BFA 11, MFA 13)
- Cory Beers
- Adam Benjamin
- Jonathan Berger (MFA 76)
- Ronnie Blake (MFA 99)
- Ron Francis Blake
- Kevin Blechdom
- Gene Bowen
- Dustin Boyer
- Anthony Brandt
- Michael Cain (BFA 88, MFA 90)
- Mario Calire
- Tim Cappello
- David Carlson
- Gilbert Castellanos
- Raven Chacon
- Carol Chaikin
- Pearl Charles
- Nicholas Frances Chase, aka N.F. Chase (MFA 00)
- Sharon Cheslow
- Ken Christianson (MFA Music Composition)
- Curtis Clark
- Randy Cohen
- Scott Colley (BFA 88)
- Ravi Coltrane (BFA 90)
- Mark Coniglio (BFA 89)
- Jim Cooper of Detholz! (one semester; dropout)
- Mikal Cronin
- John Debney (BFA 78)
- Gail Ann Dorsey
- Dean Drummond
- Kiki Ebsen (BFA 85)
- Juárez Echenique
- Guy Eckstine '75
- Efajemue
- Pedro Eustache
- Adam Fong
- Jill Fraser
- Russ Freeman
- Josh Gabriel
- Alexandra Gardner
- Peter Garland (BFA 73)
- Danny Grissett
- Kristín Þóra Haraldsdóttir
- Art Hirahara
- Julia Holter
- Steve Horowitz
- Earl Howard (74, Composition)
- Melissa Hui (MFA 90)
- Art Jarvinen
- Terry Jennings
- Kerstin Jeppsson
- Willie Jones III
- Carson Kievman (BFA/MFA, 1977), contemporary classical composer
- James King
- Kevin Kmetz
- Joel Krosnick
- Greg Kurstin
- Thomas Leeb (BFA '03)
- Josef Leimberg
- Chris Lemmon
- David C. Lewis
- James Brandon Lewis
- Eric Lindley
- Hugh Livingston
- Paul Livingstone
- Carey Lovelace
- Carla Lucero (BFA 86, Composition)
- Lusine
- Ed Mann
- Arturo Márquez (MFA 90)
- Ingram Marshall (MFA 71)
- Terrace Martin
- Maryama (2018, performer-composer / 2016 Composition)
- John Maus
- Gabrial McNair (of No Doubt) ('95)
- Roger Miller (76, Composition)
- Ann Millikan (MFA)
- John Morton ('78)
- Stephen L. Mosko
- Zane Musa
- Mark Nauseef
- Darek Oleszkiewicz
- America Olivo
- Anna Oxygen
- Charlemagne Palestine
- Kolleen Park
- Chan Poling
- Lisa Popeil
- Pirayeh Pourafar (MFA 00)
- Raaginder
- Aviva Rahmani
- Ellen Reid
- Laura Rizzotto (BFA '15)
- Curtis Roads
- Michael Eric Robinson
- Sharon Robinson
- Marina Rosenfeld (MFA 94, Art-Music)
- Dean Rosenthal (MFA 97 - did not graduate)
- Anni Rossi
- Joel Rubin
- Adam Rudolph (MFA 88)
- Otmaro Ruíz (MFA 91)
- Emma Ruth Rundle
- Salvador Santana
- Matthew Setzer
- Daniel Shulman
- Marcus Shelby
- Todd Sickafoose
- Mark So (MFA 06)
- Rand Steiger (MFA 82)
- Adam Stern (BFA 75; MFA 77, conductor)
- Carl Stone (BFA 75)
- L. Subramaniam
- Gavin Templeton
- Mia Theodoratus
- Oliver Tree
- Gregory Uhlmann
- André Vida (MFA 2005)
- Lois V Vierk
- Gregg Wager
- Jeremy Wall, of Spyro Gyra
- William Winant
- Nate Wood
- Benjamin Wynn (BFA 2002)
- Yulianna
- Marcelo Zarvos (BFA 92)
- Z'EV
- Jeremy Zuckerman (MFA '01)

=== Faculty ===
- Susan Allen
- Audrey Babcock (also alumnus)
- John Bergamo
- Gene Bowen
- Robert E. Brown
- Harold Budd
- Igor Buketoff
- Anner Bylsma
- Edward Carroll
- Swapan Chaudhuri
- Daniel Corral
- Bill Douglas
- Vinny Golia
- Charlie Haden
- Laurel Halo
- Leonid Hambro
- Alphonso Johnson
- Eyvind Kang
- Daniel Katzen
- Ulrich Krieger
- Joan LaBarbara
- Anne LeBaron
- Steve Lehman
- Daniel Lentz
- Bennie Maupin
- Roscoe Mitchell
- Buell Neidlinger
- James Newton
- Marni Nixon
- Frederick Noad
- K. P. H. Notoprojo
- Jeff Parker
- Michael Pisaro
- Mel Powell
- Ron Purcell
- T. Ranganathan
- Harihar Rao
- Taranath Rao
- David Rosenboom
- Frederic Rzewski
- Trichy Sankaran
- David Schwartz
- Wadada Leo Smith
- Luciana Souza
- David Starobin
- Rand Steiger
- Richard Stoltzman
- Volker Straebel
- Morton Subotnick
- Miroslav Tadić
- Karen Tanaka
- Rajeev Taranath
- Serge Tcherepnin
- James Tenney
- Frederick D. Tinsley
- Mark Trayle
- Fernando Valenti
- T. Viswanathan
- Allan Vogel
- Wolfgang von Schweinitz
- Michele Zukovsky

== School of Theater Arts ==
=== Alumni ===
- Kevin Adams (MFA 86, Scene Design)
- Amanda Aday (Acting)
- Ali Ahn (Acting, MFA 06)
- Perry Anzilotti
- Brandon Stirling Baker (Lighting)
- Kathy Baker (72, Acting)
- Cameron Bancroft (BFA 90, Acting)
- Dorie Barton (actress, director) (BFA)
- Stephanie Barton-Farcas (Acting)
- Tiffany Boone
- Jesse Borrego (84, Acting)
- Barbara Bosson (Acting)
- Alison Brie (BFA 05, Acting)
- Kevin Brophy
- Merritt Butrick (Acting)
- Michael Carmine
- Matthew Causey
- Don Cheadle (BFA 86, Acting)
- Natalia Cordova-Buckley
- Eliza Coupe (BFA 06, Acting)
- Jennifer Elise Cox (BFA 91, Acting)
- Juli Crockett
- Michael Cudlitz (Acting)
- Frank Darabont
- Jules de Jongh
- Emilio Delgado
- Sam Doumit
- Randall Edwards
- Shahine Ezell
- Patricia Fernández
- Dennis Gersten
- Mandy Gonzalez
- Dana Gourrier
- Richard Green
- Virginia Grise (09, MFA Writing for Performance)
- Aleshea Harris (MFA, 2014)
- Ed Harris (BFA 75, Acting)
- David Hasselhoff (73, Acting)
- Roger Holzberg (BFA 76, Writing)
- Cindy Im
- Albert Innaurato
- Bill Irwin (72, Acting)
- Elaine Kao
- Simbi Khali-Williams (BFA 93, Acting)
- Don Lake
- Michael Lassell (MFA '73, Acting)
- Scott MacDonald (Acting)
- Derek Magyar
- Andrew Matarazzo
- Justine Miceli
- Kim Milford (Acting)
- Dana Morosini (Acting)
- Laraine Newman (Acting)
- Stephanie Niznik (Acting)
- Sharon Ott
- Condola Rashad (BFA 08, Acting)
- Diona Reasonover
- Paul Reubens (Pee Wee Herman) (73, Acting)
- Michael Richards (73, Acting)
- Christopher Rivas
- Michael D. Roberts (Acting)
- Amy Keating Rogers (MFA 94)
- Douglas Rushkoff, writer, social theorist
- Katey Sagal (Acting)
- Tobe Sexton (BFA 91)
- Mark Allen Shepherd
- Jan Smithers
- Cecily Strong (BFA 06, Acting)
- Monty Taylor (Lighting Design)
- Julie Taymor
- Winston Tong
- Mageina Tovah
- Allan Trautman
- Deborah Joy Winans (MFA Acting 09)

=== Faculty ===
- Christopher Akerlind
- Libby Appel
- Fran Bennett
- Herbert Blau
- Lee Breuer
- Marissa Chibás
- Lap Chi Chu
- Ruby Cohn
- Erik Ehn
- Janie Geiser
- Lisa Gay Hamilton
- Donald Holder
- Marshall Ho'o
- Sally Jacobs
- Lars Jan
- Mirjana Joković
- Ron Cephas Jones
- Franz Marijnen
- Lew Palter
- Suzan-Lori Parks
- Joe Rohde
- Carl Hancock Rux

== Honorary degrees ==
Past honorary degree recipients include:

- Beverly Sills (1975)
- Roy Lichtenstein (1977)
- Twyla Tharp (1978)
- Gordon Davidson (1980)
- Bella Lewitzky (1981)
- Haskell Wexler (1981)
- Henry Mancini (1983)
- Jan de Gaetani (1983)
- Ravi Shankar (1985)
- John Cage (1986)
- Frank O. Gehry (1987)
- Trisha Brown (1988)
- Donn Tatum (1989)
- Luis Valdez (1989)
- Paul Taylor (1989)
- Ornette Coleman (1990)
- Ustad Ali Akbar Khan (1991)
- Pearl Primus (1991)
- Adrian Piper (1992)
- Ray Bradbury (1992)
- Yvonne Rainer (1993)
- Steven Bochco (1993)
- Stan Brakhage (1994)
- Vija Celmins (1994)
- Betye Saar (1995)
- Carolyn Forche (1995)
- Laurie Anderson (1996)
- Elvin Jones (1996)
- Chantal Akerman (1997)
- Lee Breuer (1998)
- Ed Ruscha (1999)
- Bill Viola (2000)
- Steve Reich (2000)
- Ry Cooder (2001)
- Faith Hubley (2001)
- Bruce Nauman (2001)
- Alice Coltrane (2002)
- Roy E. Disney (2003)
- Anna Halprin (2003)
- Carolee Schneemann (2003)
- Christian Wolff (2004)
- Daniel Nagrin (2004)
- James Newton (2005)
- Julius Shulman (2005)
- Rudy VanderLans (2006)
- Rudy Perez (2006)
- Alonzo King (2007)
- Harry Belafonte (2008)
- Herbert Blau (2008)
- Terry Riley (2008)
- Elizabeth LeCompte (2009)
- Morton Subotnick (2009)
- Trimpin (2010)
- Annette Bening (2011)
- Donald McKayle (2011)
- Peter Sellars (2012)
- Eric Fischl (2013)
- John Lasseter (2014)
- David Hildebrand Wilson (2015)
- Sheila Levrant de Bretteville (2015)
- Wadada Leo Smith (2016)
- Don Cheadle (2016)
- Edgar Heap of Birds (2018)
- Wayne Shorter (2022)
- Charles Lloyd (2022)
- Esperanza Spalding (2022)
- N. Scott Momaday (2023)
- Keanu Reeves (2024)
- Gina Prince-Bythewood (2024)
- Drew Barrymore (2025)
- Barbara Carrasco (2025)
- Taylor Mac (2026)
