= Wager =

Wager can refer to:

== Gambling ==
- Wager, the amount of a valuable staked when gambling on an event with an uncertain outcome, with the primary intent of winning money or material goods
- Legal wager, required by both parties at the preliminary hearing, under the early Roman Republic's Legis Actiones procedure
- Scientific wager, a wager whose outcome is settled by scientific method

== People with the name ==
- Wager Swayne (1834–1902), American military Governor
- Sir Charles Wager (1666–1743), British Admiral
- David Wager (1804–1870), New York politician
- Gregg Wager (born 1958), American composer
- Harold Wager (1862–1929), British botanist
- Lawrence Wager (1904–1965), British geologist, explorer and mountaineer
- Michael Wager (1925–2011), American actor
- Tor Wager, American neuroscientist
- Walter Wager (1924–2004), American novelist

== Ships of the Royal Navy ==
- HMS Wager (1739), a square-rigged sixth-rate Royal Navy ship wrecked in 1741
- Wager Mutiny, mutiny that occurred after loss of HMS Wager in 1741
- HMS Wager (R98), a W-class destroyer launched in 1943

== Films ==
- The Wager (1998 film), a short film
- The Wager (2007 film), a feature film

== Literature ==
- The Wager: A Tale of Shipwreck, Mutiny and Murder, a 2023 nonfiction book by David Grann

== See also ==
- WAGR syndrome, a rare genetic syndrome
