= Museo de los Santos y Arte Nacional =

Museum in San Juan, Puerto Rico

MUSAN: Museo de los Santos y Arte Nacional

The Museo de los Santos y Arte Nacional (MUSAN) is a museum in the Santurce Arts District of San Juan, Puerto Rico which has several collections of carved 'santo' sculptures in addition to several galleries showing artworks by local artists.

== History ==
The museum grew out of the collection of santos assembled by José Torres Meléndez, a physician from Morovis. Its permanent home on Ponce de León Avenue in Santurce was inaugurated in November 2022, with a collection of more than 400 santos dating from the 18th century to contemporary carvers. In addition to its historical collection, the museum exhibits work by contemporary carvers and other Puerto Rican artists.

=== Origins online ===
Jose Torres Melendez with Ricardo Alegria discussing the idea of a new museum dedicated to santos.

The museum started as an experimental 'virtual museum' with the domain museodelossantos.com in 2005. It was created to promote Puerto Rican Art and the tradition of 'santos' to tourists since no information was easily available in English.

Due to requests from the 'virtual museum', Meléndez's collection of santos was made available for public viewing by appointment only at the office of aribbean Consulting in San Juan, PR.

Meléndez with Teodoro Vidal at the 'Encuentro de Santeros Nacional' in 2015.

Meléndez began the process of creating a not-for-profit corporation with the idea of establishing a permanent museum after discussion with prominent experts on the santos tradition such as Teodoro Vidal and Ricardo Alegría. Non-profit status 501(c)(3) was granted by the Internal Revenue Service on November 19, 2018. Additional non-profit status 1101.01(a)(2)(a)(3) was approved by Hacienda de Puerto Rico on June 25, 2019. This status from Hacienda de Puerto Rico allowed Museo de los Santos Inc to participate as an authorized charity in the general category for donations under the Ley 20, Ley 22 and Act 60 investment incentive programs. The change to non-profit status also resulted in a new internet domain musan.org.

=== Permanent museum ===
In 2019 a former printing plant was acquired and renovations took place as a 'grass-roots' effort, renovation of the building was done with 'seed-money' from several supporters, but mostly from volunteer efforts of the local community. After several delays due to covid-19 related issues, a formal inauguration of the new facilities on November 14, 2022.

Actress Angela Meyer and Melendez at the inauguration of MUSAN.

The opening of the museum's facilities in Santurce in November 2022 was covered by El Nuevo Día, which also reported on its first anniversary in November 2023. In October 2025, The New York Times published a feature by Christine Negroni on the museum's role in encouraging young carvers, highlighting the exhibition Todopoderoso by Puerto Rican artist Joshua Nazario. In 2026, Remezcla included MUSAN in a list of places in Puerto Rico connected to Bad Bunny's album Debí Tirar Más Fotos. In September 2026, the museum hosted Anécdotas de un San Pedrito, an exhibition marking the return of Quique Rivera to the visual arts, which received coverage in El Adoquín Times and El Nuevo Día.

== Mission ==
The mission of Museo de los Santos y Arte Nacional (MUSAN) is to create a self-sustaining museum dedicated to the preservation, research and exhibition of the Puerto Rican tradition of 'santos' or 'santos de palo' from religious origins to a contemporary reflection of Puerto Rican culture through permanent collections, special exhibitions, community projects and cultural activities.

== Exhibitions ==
=== 2022 ===
Community Artists Showcase:Caos en Santurce

- Kívan Quiñones Beltrán: Bajo del Cielo... Sobre La Tierra (Inaugural Exhibition)
- Yamilith Flores Reyes: Habitar el Fuego - Ánima Sola

=== 2023 ===
Collective Exhibition: Arte Evolución

- José Rosa: Exhibición de Serigrafías (Colección de Simonpietri-Fernández)

=== 2024 ===
- Elí Barreto: Flores
- Various Carvers by Invitation: La Revolución de los Santos

=== 2025 ===
- Annie Y. Saldána: Casitas
- Christopher Paz-Rivera: Sato Santo/Santo Sato
- Joshua Nazario: Todopodoroso
- Open Exhibition for Woodcarvers: El Altar Puertoriqueño

=== 2026 ===
- Isabella Mellado: Entre Velos
- Quique Rivera Rivera: Anécdotas de un San Pedrito
- Annual Exhibition of Contemporary Woodcarvers (Talladores): Anima Sola: Fuego, Fuerza y Pasión
