= Haruko Tanaka =

- Born: 1974; Queens, New York
- Died: October 2019 (aged 44–45)
- Education: University of Southern California; California Institute of the Arts
- Occupations: Artist, filmmaker

Haruko Tanaka (b. Queens, NY 1974, d. 2019) was a Los Angeles–based artist and filmmaker. She was awarded fellowships and residencies at the Japanese American National Museum and the Echo Park Film Center. Tanaka is also part of the psychic duo Krystal Krunch along with Asher Hartman. Her videos, performances, and intuitive sessions have been shown at or sponsored by a range of places including the Walker Art Center, the Tang Museum, the Hammer Museum, the Los Angeles County Arts Commission, Southern Exposure, and Machine Project. She earned her BFA in art at the University of Southern California in 1997. She then received her MFA in photography at the California Institute of the Arts in 2003. Tanaka was a MacDowell Fellowship in 2018.
