= FlixMix =

1993 video game

- Developer(s): Celeris
- Publisher(s): Celeris: JP: StarCraft
- Composer(s): Aaron Levitz; Takeshi Abo (PC-98 version)
- Platform(s): MS-DOS, PC-98
- Release: December 3, 1993
- Genre(s): Puzzle
- Mode(s): Single-player, multiplayer

FlixMix is a puzzle video game developed and published by Celeris. The game focuses on solving jigsaw-like puzzles with animated images.

== Gameplay ==
The object of the game is to place all the rectangular pieces into the correct positions. Puzzle pieces can be varied in size to as few as 2x2 to over 10x10, depending on the puzzle. Additional options to increase difficulty include mirrored or flipped pieces, locking correctly placed pieces, blanking placed pieces after a time delay, and occasionally playing the video clip in reverse.

There are four game modes in FlixMix. In Single Mingle, the player has unlimited time to solve a single puzzle. In Scramblecade, the player rotates through all the puzzles in a tileset, with the pieces shrinking in size almost each round. The player has a time limit, which can be extended by placing pieces, placing pieces in bonus spaces worth extra time and points, and solving puzzles. In Joint Venture, up to nine players take turns solving a sequence of puzzles with the winner being the one to solve the most puzzles within a time limit. In Mix'n'Match, up to nine players take turns solving the same puzzle in sequence, with the player with the lowest time declared the winner.

== Tilesets ==
The puzzles are divided into two tilesets of nine puzzles each. Each puzzle has its own background music. In the shareware version, only the first puzzle in each tileset is playable, though all puzzles can be viewed by watching a gameplay demo.

=== Tileset #001: Fit To Be Tiled ===
Title	Description	Music
Spherical Aberration	Four polished ball bearings rotate in a circle atop a checkerboard pattern.	"Ragtime Dance" by Scott Joplin
Quixotic Box Paradox	An impossible box figure rotates over a blue background.	original music by Aaron Levitz
Puddle Muddle	Ripples in a pool of water.	"Fugue No. 5 in D Major" By Johann Sebastian Bach (BWV 850)
Mishmash Mesh	A yellow mesh grid moves in wave patterns over a navy-blue background.	original music by Aaron Levitz
Reflection Perplexion	Several reflective spheres rotate around a reflective prism.	"The Spinning Song" by Felix Mendelssohn
Trig Enigma	Sinusoidal lines scroll down across a green background.	original music by A.D. Chaplin
Juggle Jumble	Several green circles are juggled in front of a polka-dotted blue background.	original music by Aaron Levitz
Spiral Beguiler	A red spirograph-like design over a yellow background.	"Prelude No. 5 in D Major" by Johann Sebastian Bach (BWV 850)
Right Angleworms	Multiple colored "worms" move along a Hilbert curve.	original music by A.D. Chaplin

=== Tileset #002: Grid Riddlers ===
Title	Description	Music
Sphere Gears	Green balls moving in circle patterns, meshing with each other.	"Cha Cha Cha a la Mode" by A.D. Chaplin
Coil Turmoil	Multiple overlaid cyan helix spinning around their axes of length.	"Etude Op.10, No.4" by Frédéric Chopin
Radiant Gradients	Color gradients rotate around a number of fixed points.	original music by A.D. Chaplin
Box Interlocks	A mesh grid moves in wave patterns.	"Ozzie the Hip" by Jory K. Prum
Moire Melee	A Moiré pattern.	"Etude Op.10, No.1" by Frédéric Chopin
Path'O'Logical	Bees moving over a honeycomb.	"Etude Op.10, No.2" and "Etude, Op.25 No.2" by Frédéric Chopin
Variety Anxiety	A Kaleidoscope pattern.	"Reverie" by Claude Debussy
Plasma Phantasma	A color-changing gaseous pattern.	"Lamento Latino" by A.D. Chaplin
Maze Hypnosis	Color-changing concentric squares.	"Fugue in D Minor" by Johann Sebastian Bach (BWV 565)
