= Stephen Selkowitz =

American building scientist

Stephen E. Selkowitz
- Born: March 8, 1948 (age 78); Boston, Massachusetts
- Education: Harvard University (B.A.); California Institute of the Arts (MFA in Environmental Design)
- Known for: Advancement in building science, Low emissivity windows
- Awards: ENR Award of Excellence
- Scientific career
- Fields: Building science, Energy conservation
- Workplaces: Lawrence Berkeley National Laboratory

Stephen E. Selkowitz is an American building scientist, and a leading researcher of energy efficiency in building envelopes. He is currently a senior advisor for building science at the Lawrence Berkeley National Laboratory. In 2014, he received the Award of Excellence from Engineering News-Record (formerly the Man of the Year award).

== Life and career ==
Selkowitz was born March 8, 1948, and grew up in Newton, Massachusetts. His father was a pharmacist.

Selkowitz graduated from Harvard University with a B.A. in physics. While an undergraduate, Selkowitz's interest in the environment was increased through participation in Buckminster Fuller's World Game. He received a Master of Fine Arts in Environmental Design from the California Institute of the Arts (CalArts) in 1972. Before beginning his career at Lawrence Berkeley National Laboratory (Berkeley Lab), Selkowitz taught at CalArts and worked at a consulting engineering firm.

Selkowitz led research at Berkeley Lab to reduce the amount of heat transfer through windows. The low-emissivity (low-E) windows they developed have saved $7.7 billion on energy costs and 1.2 quadrillion BTUs, according to National Academy of Sciences' data. Selkowitz had to convince window manufacturers of the benefits of low-E glass before its use became widespread.

== Awards ==
Selkowitz received the ENR Award of Excellence "for relentlessly working to reduce the carbon footprint of buildings and for moving the nation toward better building performance, as well as for being the master of commercializing energy-efficient building technologies and the mastermind of FLEXLAB," the Facility for Low-Energy eXperiments in Buildings located at Berkeley Lab.

Selkowitz is a recipient of the Berkeley Lab Prize – Lifetime Achievement Award in the area of societal impact. This award honors a career of achievement and Selkowitz was recognized for his work to reduce energy use in buildings.
