= Ayzay Ukwuoma =

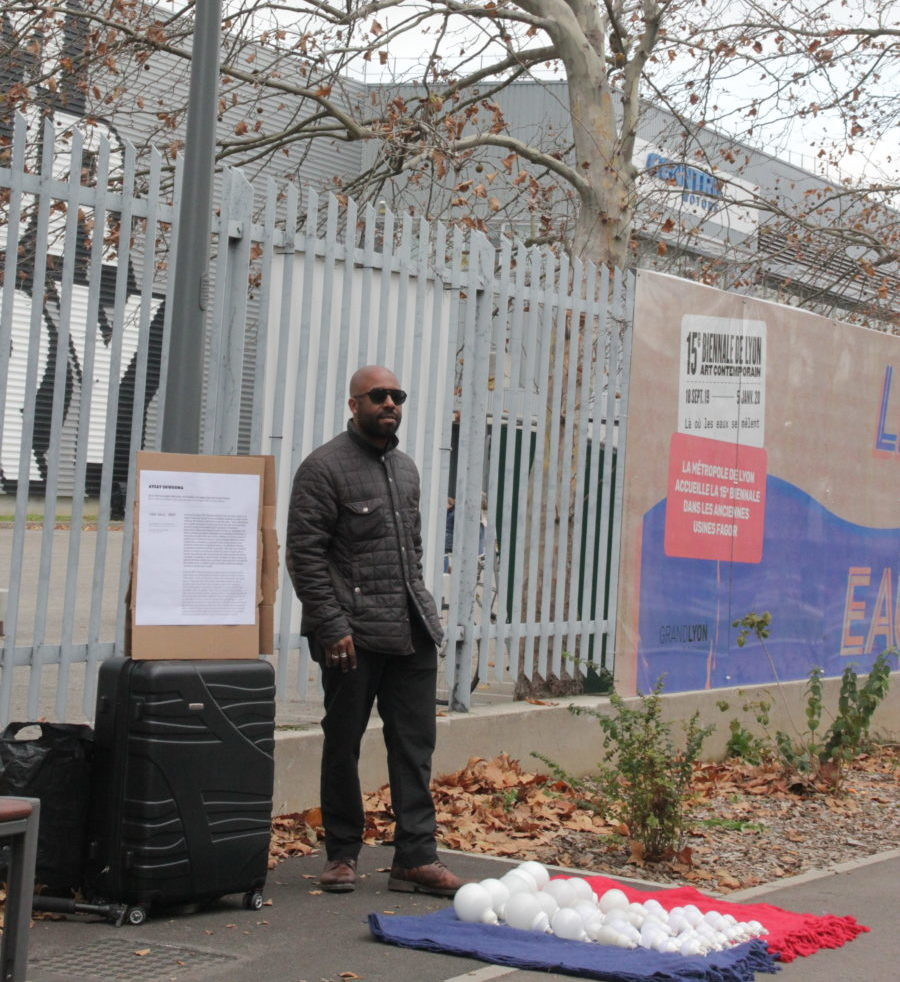
- Ukwuoma in 2019
- Born: Ezennwa Osondu Ukwuoma; Los Angeles, California
- Education: CalArts, George Washington University
- Known for: placing Art in books.
- Website: Official Site

Ayzay Ukwuoma is an American interdisciplinary artist working in paint, text, installations, and performance. His works include components of spatial intervention, plays on sign systems, and representations of language in codified forms, such as hand-written Morse or binary code—0's and 1's.

== Early life and education ==
Ayzay Ukwuoma was born in Los Angeles, where as a youth, he began painting ephemeral public-facing non-commissioned art works. He is an MFA graduate of CalArts, and has a master's degree in information systems and technology from George Washington University.

== Art in books ==
While in Europe during the early 2010s, Ukwuoma began creating large paintings on unstretched canvas, which he would share with others in a unique way. Adjusting the overall composition of his works in order to make them more accessible, Ukwuoma would cut his paintings into small pieces for placement inside of books. He would then visit the art sections of libraries and bookstores, and place his painting pieces inside of books for future discovery. On the back of each painting piece, signed with an alias of "ETMCA", Ukwuoma left hand-written instructions to enable a response, and received multiple replies from discoverers of his works.

=== In cities ===
Ukwuoma developed this approach of distributing his works into a series of exhibitions, held in the art sections of numerous major city libraries within Europe. Upon arrival in a city, he would search for a library in which to place a painting, occasionally gifting those that met and assisted him with pieces from the painting itself. Each painting was entitled with the name of the city in which he had placed it, including Berlin, Grenoble, Marseille, Paris, Rome, Valence, Valencia, and Venice. Ukwuoma retained a large piece of each painting as a remnant of the network of paintings for exhibition, and presented them in Dubai in 2014. Ukwuoma stated that he recognized the entirety of each "city" painting as a network, which connected a set of people in the general landscape of the city where it was placed, within two degrees of separation.

=== As a poem ===
In 2012, Ukwuoma created a poem called 'The Ones', and encoded the poem in Morse code. He painted the poem across ten black unstretched canvases, and upon cutting them, began a new series of placements for this series of art in books in Los Angeles. The artist explained that his motivation for creating the 20-line poem was:

" ...to compose a commemorative work dedicated to 'The Ones', a figurative group of people that anyone can identify with as their ancestors, predecessors or 'ones' that existed, sacrificed, or performed the work that has made the lives, livelihood, or pursuits we each enjoy possible. The 'ones' that come to mind for one person may differ from the “ones” of another. However, this poem was created to give respect to ALL of the 'ones'."[7]
