= Kent Matsuoka =

American film producer

Kent Matsuoka is an American born independent producer and location manager of Japanese (nisei) descent. Born in Sacramento, California, he studied film and photography at the California Institute of the Arts.

As a location scout in Hollywood, he has scouted for Burlesque, Castle, Changling, The Fighter, The Hangover Part III, Hawaii Five-0, The Last Ship and commercials for brands such as Apple, ExxonMobil, Ford, Hyundai, Mountain Dew, Nike, Pepsi, Verizon and others.

Matsuoka was honored with a California on Location Award (COLA) for Commercial Location Professional of the Year in 2010, a COLA nomination in 2013, and a nomination for the inaugural Location Managers Guild Award for Commercial Location Professional in 2014.

He has also been responsible for producing many print editorials, advertising, commercials, the Roger Corman feature Supergator, served on the board of the Location Managers Guild of America, and on the Teamster 399 steering committee.

== Filmography ==
- Mindhunter (2015) location scout
- Doll & Em (2015) Los Angeles location manager
- Revolution (2014) 2nd unit location manager
- The Hangover Part III (2013) key assistant location manager
- Hawaii Five-0 (2011) key assistant location manager
- Burlesque (2010) key assistant location manager
- A Single Man (2010) location scout
- Castle (2009) location scout
- Hannah Montana: The Movie (2009) location scout
- State of Play (2009) location scout
- He's Just Not That into You (2009) location scout
- Role Models (2008) location scout: additional photography
- Dirty Sexy Money (2008) location scout
- Changeling (2008) assistant location manager
- Supergator (2007) associate producer
- Death Proof (2007) assistant location manager
- The Number 23 (2007) assistant location manager
- The Holiday (2006) assistant location manager
- Alias (2005) water safety
- CSI: Miami (2005) water safety
