= Jory Prum =

American audio engineer (1975–2016)

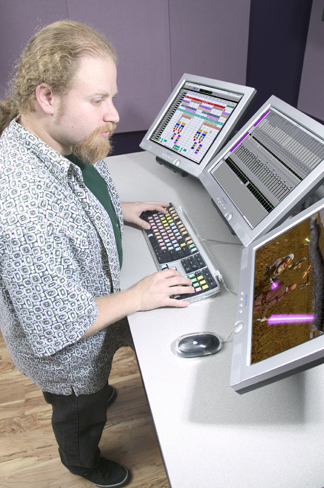
- Photo of Jory Prum in 2005.
- Born: January 31, 1975; Fullerton, California, U.S.
- Died: April 22, 2016 (aged 41); U.S.
- Other name: Jory K. Prum
- Occupations: Audio engineer, sound designer
- Years active: 1993–2016
- Website: studio.jory.org

Jory Prum (January 31, 1975 – April 22, 2016), also known as Jory K. Prum, was an American audio engineer, best known for his work in film and video games. He was the owner of a recording studio located in the San Francisco Bay Area.

== Biography ==
Prum was born in Fullerton, California, attended Troy High School's technology magnet, and later studied sound for film and video as an undergraduate student at the California Institute of the Arts (CalArts) in the 1990s under John Payne, Craig Smith, and Doug Loveid. While studying at CalArts, Prum worked on many student films, some of which were screened at festivals, such as Spike and Mike's Festival of Animation. One such film, a parody of Schoolhouse Rock! titled Political Correction, was a collaboration between Prum and fellow student Steven Fonti. Another was Adam Lane's Sea Slugs, a stop-motion animation about pirate slugs on the open seas, which was also featured as part of MTV's Cartoon Sushi.

After graduating with a Bachelor of Fine Arts degree, Prum worked as an Electron at Jim Henson's Creature Shop and then briefly at Disney Online. After being let go, he inquired during a CalArts job fair about employment opportunities in the sound department of LucasArts Entertainment Company. He joined the LucasArts sound team in January 1999 and was involved with all of the Star Wars: Episode I – The Phantom Menace release titles and most of the other games published by both LucasArts and Lucas Learning between early 1999 and the beginning of 2001.

Prum departed LucasArts at the start of 2001 and continued to work in video game sound. He contributed sound effects, recorded voiceover and music and mixed cutscenes and orchestral scores for numerous games, such as LucasArts' Knights of the Old Republic, Telltale Games' The Walking Dead: The Game—for which Prum and his team won the Game Audio Network Guild's 2013 award for Best Dialogue—The Wolf Among Us, and Sam & Max episodic titles, Double Fine Productions' crowdfunded Broken Age, Ubisoft's CSI games, and Pandemic Studios' Mercenaries 2: World in Flames. Prum and his dialogue production team have been nominated nine times for "Best Voice Acting" Aggie Awards and have won three times.

In addition to video games, Prum worked in post-production audio for feature films. He created the voice of the big bird, Leo, in Pixar Animation Studio's animated short film For the Birds, earning him a mention in Ralph Eggleston's acceptance speech at the 74th Academy Awards. Prum also worked as the foley recordist on Focus Features' Lost in Translation, and Sony Pictures' Adaptation.

In 2004, Prum set up a recording studio, Studio Jory, near his home in Fairfax, California.

In August 2014, Prum recovered the aging audio archives of the point-and-click adventure game Grim Fandango as part of Double Fine Productions' restoration and remastering effort. He also worked with composer Peter McConnell to record and mix the new orchestral score, performed by the Melbourne Symphony Orchestra.

Prum died on April 22, 2016, after suffering severe injuries in a motorcycle accident.

The final game Prum worked on was 2064: Read Only Memories, which is dedicated to him.

== Accolades ==
Year	Game	Ceremony	Category	Result	Ref.
2007	Bone: The Great Cow Race	Independent Games Festival	Excellence in Audio	Nominated	
2008	Sam & Max: Beyond Time and Space	Aggie Awards	Best Voice Acting	Nominated	
2009	Tales of Monkey Island	Aggie Awards	Best Voice Acting	Won	
2010	Sam & Max: The Devil's Playhouse	Aggie Awards	Best Voice Acting	Won	
2010	Nelson Tethers: Puzzle Agent	Aggie Awards	Best Voice Acting	Nominated	
2011	Back to the Future: The Game	Aggie Awards	Best Voice Acting	Nominated	
2012	The Walking Dead	Aggie Awards	Best Voice Acting	Won	
2013	The Walking Dead	Game Audio Network Guild Awards	Best Dialog	Won	
2013	The Walking Dead: 400 Days	Aggie Awards	Best Voice Acting	Nominated	
2014	Broken Age	Golden Joystick Awards	Best Audio	Nominated	
2014	The Wolf Among Us	Golden Joystick Awards	Best Audio	Nominated	
2014	The Wolf Among Us	Aggie Awards	Best Voice Acting	Nominated	
2014	The Walking Dead, Season 2	Aggie Awards	Best Voice Acting	Nominated	
2015	The Walking Dead, Season 2	Game Audio Network Guild Awards	Best Dialog	Nominated	
2015	Among the Sleep	National Academy of Video Game Trade Reviewers	Best use of Sound, New IP	Nominated	
2015	Among the Sleep	Spillprisen (Norwegian Game Awards)	Best Audio	Won	
2015	UHR-Warlords	Spillprisen (Norwegian Game Awards)	Best Audio	Nominated	

== Selected games ==
- 2064: Read Only Memories (2017), MidBoss
- Earthlock: Festival of Magic (2016), Snowcastle Games
- Through the Woods (2016), Antagonist
- Manual Samuel (2016), Perfectly Paranormal
- Grim Fandango Remastered (2015), Double Fine
- Among the Sleep (2014), Krillbite Studio
- Broken Age (2014), Double Fine
- Gabriel Knight: Sins of the Fathers (2014), Pinkerton Road
- The Walking Dead: The Game, Season 2 (2014), Telltale Games
- The Walking Dead: 400 Days (2013), Telltale Games
- The Wolf Among Us (2013), Telltale Games
- The Walking Dead: The Game (2012), Telltale Games
- Brütal Legend (2009), Double Fine
- Tales of Monkey Island (2009), Telltale Games
- The Sims 2 (2003), EA/Maxis
- Star Wars: Knights of the Old Republic (2003), LucasArts
- SimCity 4 (2002), EA/Maxis
- Escape from Monkey Island (2000), LucasArts
- FlixMix (1993), Celeris
