= Soo Kim =

South Korean-born American artist (b. 1969)

- Born: Soo Kim; 1969 (age 56–57); South Korea
- Education: California Institute of the Arts (MFA)
- Known for: Art, photography
- Awards: California Community Foundation Fellowship
- Website: www.sookim.org

Soo Kim (born 1969) is a South Korean-born American visual artist, and educator.

== Biography ==
She was born in 1969, in South Korea; and moved to Los Angeles in 1980. She earned a B.A. degree from the University of California, Riverside, and a M.F.A. degree from California Institute of the Arts.

Kim lives in Los Angeles and is on the faculty at Otis College of Art and Design. Kim often employs techniques of cutting and layering in order to introduce areas of absence or disruption in what we tend to take for granted—the interpretation of photographic images."

Kim’s work is in the collection of the J. Paul Getty Museum. In 2013, Kim was awarded the prestigious John Gutmann Photography Fellowship by the San Francisco Foundation.

== Solo exhibitions ==
- Midday Moon, Angles Gallery, Los Angeles, CA, 2012
- Black Sun, Angles Gallery, Los Angeles, CA, 2011
- The Corners of the Sea, Julie Saul Gallery, New York, NY, 2010
- Faraway, Seaver Gallery, Marlborough School, Los Angeles, CA, 2010
- Superheavies, Sandroni Rey, Los Angeles, CA, 2008
- They Stop Looking at the Sky, Pasadena Museum of California Art, Pasadena, CA, 2006
- A Week Inside Two Days, Sandroni Rey, Los Angeles, CA, 2005
- The Future’s Owned By You and Me, Los Angeles County Metropolitan Transportation Authority, Los Angeles, CA, 2005
- Soo Kim: New Work, Sandroni Rey, Venice, CA, 2002
- Soo Kim: New Work, Montgomery Gallery, Claremont, CA (catalog), 1999
- Stonewashing, Bandits-mages, Bourges, France, 1995
- (Carry) A Big Stick, Tropical Installations, Los Angeles, CA, 1993

== Selected public collections ==
- J. Paul Getty Museum
- Los Angeles County Museum of Art
- Albright-Knox Art Gallery
- The Broad Foundation
- Judith and Michael Ovitz Collection
- Susan Bay and Leonard Nimoy Collection
- Joyce and Ted Strauss Collection
- Museum of Photographic Arts, San Diego
- North Carolina Museum of Art
- The California Museum of Photography, University of California, Riverside
- University Art Museum, University of California, Santa Barbara
- University of California, Irvine
