= Nikita Shokhov =

Russian visual and film maker

- Никита Константинович Шохов
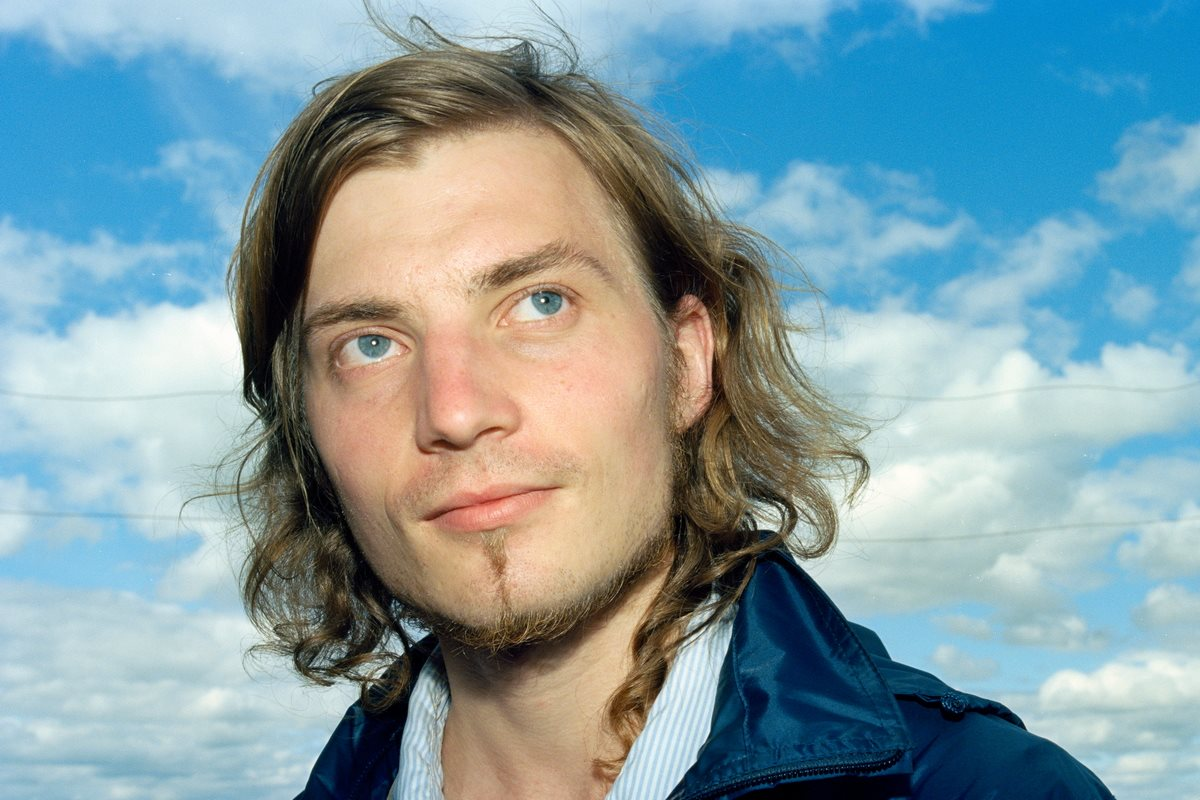
- Born: 15 February 1988 (age 38); Kamensk-Uralsky, USSR
- Education: 2010—2013 Rodchenko Art School; 2018—2019 California Institute of the Arts; 2020 School of Visual Arts at Virginia Tech
- Awards: World Press Photo – 3rd prize for Staged Portrait Stories; 2014 Utrish
- Website: nikitashokhov.art

Nikita Shokhov (Russian: Никита Константинович Шохов; born 1988) is a visual artist and filmmaker. In 2014, he received third prize from the World Press Photo awards in the Staged Portrait: Stories category.

== Biography ==
Nikita Shokhov is the son of Russian painter, art critic, and associate professor at Tyumen State University Konstantin Shokhov. He was born in Kamensk-Uralsky, USSR. Despite an inherited interest in visual arts, he initially studied at Ural State Law University in Ekaterinburg. Immediately after that, he lost interest in the legal profession and decided to study photography and cinema. He joined the photography club at the Metenkov House Museum of Photography (Russian: Дом Метенкова), attended workshops led by renowned photographer Sergey Rogozhkin, and attended cinematography classes at Sverdlovsk Film Studio. He then moved to Moscow to enroll in The Rodchenko Art School and continued his education at the documentary photography workshop under the guidance of Igor Mukhin. In the late 2010s, he continued his education at California Institute of the Arts and School of Visual Arts at Virginia Tech.

== Art practice ==
Shokhov works with both still and moving images. Through his art projects, he explores the duality of body and mind, myth and reality, human nature, religions, history, and culture. He works in collaboration with his spouse Anna Evtiugina who takes roles of co-author and producer, depending on the project.

Shokhov's photographs were published in The New York Times, The Guardian, Le Monde, Harper's Bazaar Art, l'Insensé, Openspace, Elle, Time Out and British Journal of Photography, L'Officiel Russia, L'Express, Courrier International, IL, China Newsweek, Calvert Journal, Colta, and YET magazine. He participated in numerous art festivals and biennales, including Manifesta 10 in Saint Petersburg, Moscow Biennale of Contemporary Art, and Photoquai in Paris.

=== Photography ===
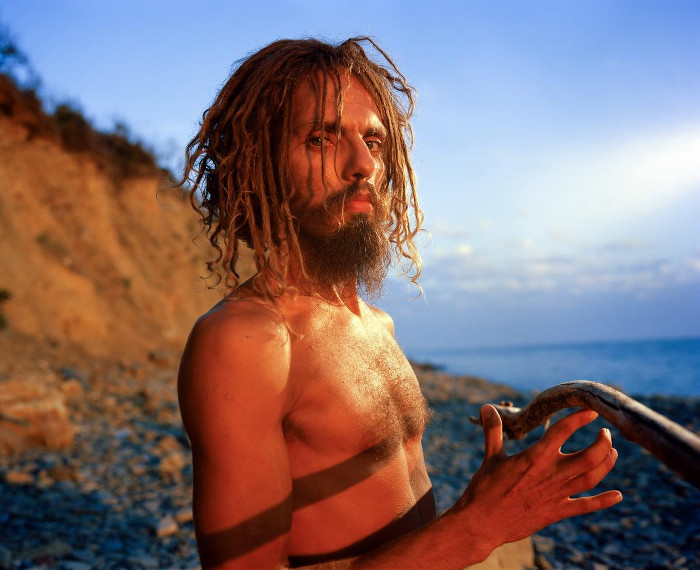
The Utrish series, 2013

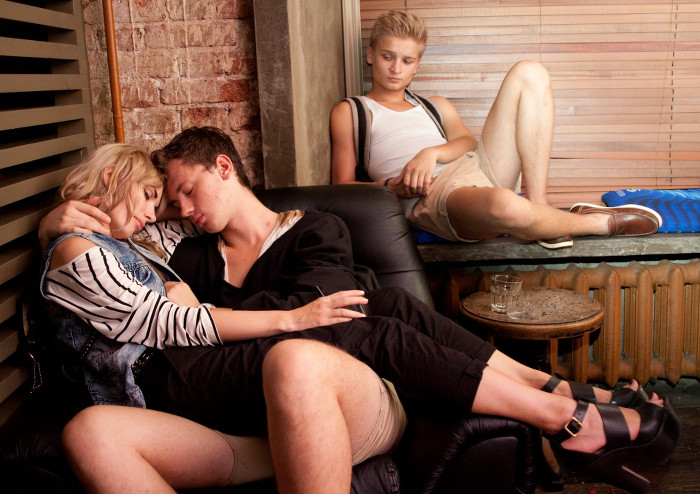
The Moscow-Night life series, 2012

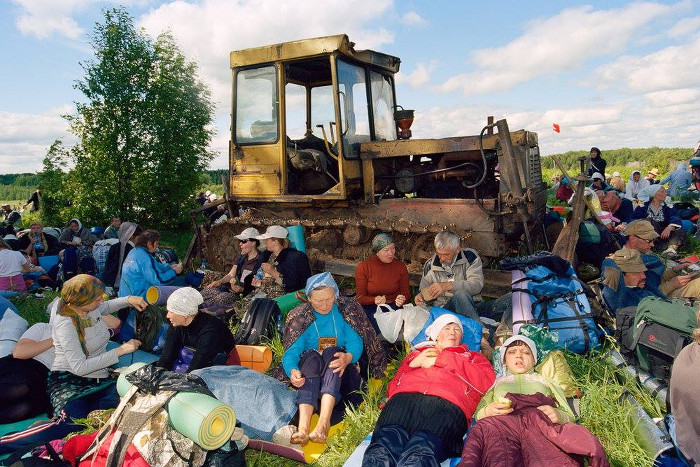
The Sacred Procession series, 2012

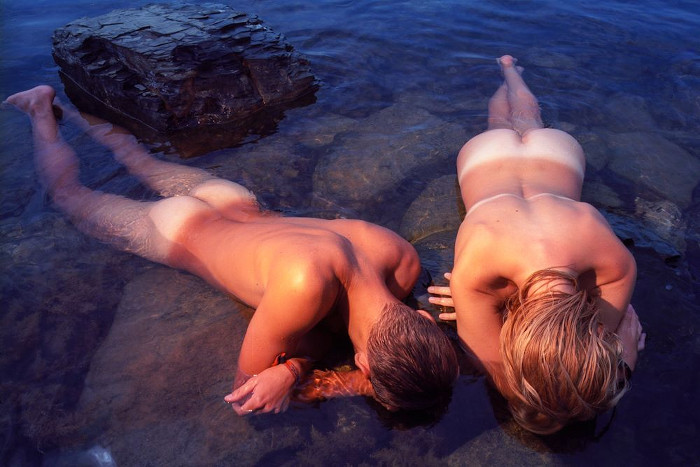
The Black Sea series, 2012

The series "Moscow Nightlife" (2010–2015) is a study on human behavior. Shokhov spent several years documenting a demographically diverse range of Muscovites, from hipsters to low class people at different settings and different moments of their night out. Through Shokhov's sober eyes, the party-makers appear similar to carnival revellers in Mikhail Bakhtin's philosophy works.

Shokhov's thesis project at the Rodchenko Art School, the series "Rublevka" (2012–2013), was a visual exploration of a prestigious residential area of the same name to the west of Moscow. Rublevka is where the residences of nouveau riche are located and also the place with the highest social stratification in Russia. In his photo report, Shokhov captured the new elite, the ordinary inhabitants, and the guest workers to highlight the threatening gap between extremely rich and incredibly poor.

The series "Black Sea" (2011–2012) was created at several Black Sea resorts, such as Sochi and Anapa, and was dedicated to Russian beach culture. It resembles Martin Parr's photobook The Last Resort (1986) that represented working-class vacationers in the UK, and photographs by Sergey Rogozhkin on Black Sea beaches in the 1980s.

In the series "Utrich", Shokhov combined documentary and staged photography methods to approach biblical motives. It was produced at Utrish national park on the northern shore of the Black Sea, which has been a popular spot among nudists since the 1980s. Vacationers from the nudist camps were invited as models.

The series "Children Personal Space" (2014) involved research on the living space of young people and the way they interact with it, with surreal scenarios shot in routine environments.

In the series "Sacred Procession" (2012–2014), Shokhov approached religious processions in provincial towns, and photographed them candidly, producing an unedited report.

A number of Shokhov's projects were dedicated to the contemporary Russian character. He sampled the way of life of Russian people and their ties to national culture in the small towns of Bologoe (shot in 2014) and Pereslavl-Zalessky (shot in 2013), a Sep village in Udmurtia. In 2014, Shokhov took part in a large "Where Does the Motherland Begin?" national photographic project aimed to depict a variety of Russian traditions and overlapping of soviet and modern Russian culture.

In the series "Scan", (2013–2016) Shokhov remained within the documentary tradition but went beyond the boundaries of direct photography. In that formal experiment, he used a slit-scan photography technique to capture 40 seconds of reality in one image using a view camera with a Better Light scanning back. Therefore, the moving objects, such as cars and people, undergo the process of plastic deformation while still objects such as architecture and landscapes appear as expected. Photographs of the "Scan" series portray processions, such as Mardi Gras in New Orleans, Saint Patrick's Day in Boston, New York, and Washington, Victory parade, and communist demonstration in Moscow and Velikoretsky Sacred Procession in Kirov Oblast. With the use of this artistic technique, Shokhov added a new visual metaphor to the mass gathering, where individuality becomes blurred and distorted.

The series "Flaming Motors" was captured at the Gorky Automobile Plant (GAZ) in Nizhny Novgorod. The title refers to the figurative name, given to new Soviet plants at the time of mass industrialization. The series depicts industrial life through the prism of human-robot interaction. It also romanticizes the industrial buildings, initially built for solely functional purposes, and the cities that surround them.

=== Visual installations and virtual environments ===
"The Last March" (2017) was a video installation created in collaboration with Russian-American artist Naum Medovoy. The exhibition in Moscow Museum of Modern Art presented Medovoy's graphic works, a film produced in memory of Soviet soldiers that were classified as missing in action, and the prisoners of war who were declared "Traitors to the Motherland" and sent to labor camps and Gulag. Shokhov presented two works. His film combined fragments of Medovoy's film with recently recorded footage of present-day Moscow and New York to highlight the gap between values of the mid-century and the present time. The second installation provided a contemporary interpretation of Medovoy's diaries and sketchbooks with a focus on women identity, stereotyping, and the tensions of daily life for a woman.

The project "Ice" (2015–2017) was an experimental film and immersive video installation by Shokhov, Andrey Kachalian, and Albina Mochryakova. It combined the features of narrative film, documentary film, and performance art. It explored concepts of carnivalesque, freedom, and physicality. The project was filmed at many nudist colonies at the Black Sea beaches of the Crimea peninsula with non-professional performers.

"Klaxon" (2017–2020) is a virtual reality experience that addresses questions of race and gender. The script combines a play by J. William Howe that explores the gender identity and Shokhov's research on racial identity. The story unfolded around a black woman on the way to acceptance of her identity. The lead role was played by several actresses of different ages and races. The film was produced with a 360-degree camera in different locations, including Indiana University Bloomington, and New York City. Shokhov and Evtiugina aimed to facilitate cross-cultural dialogue and worked with a diverse team of Russian and American crew, artists and scholars. The cast followed Shokhov's guided improvisation method. The use of VR allows the audience to contemplate the memories and the reflections of the protagonist.

== Awards ==
- 2014: Third prize, World Press Photo award, Staged Portrait: Stories category for his Utrich series
- 2015: Silver Camera Award (Children Personal Space series)
- 2019: Nova Art Award for the 360 degrees film Klaxon, in collaboration with Anna Evtiugina

== Shows ==
=== Solo shows ===
- 2012 Empty Hills. The Space of Joy, Galerie Iragui, Moscow
- 2012 Sochi. City of the Future Olympic Games, White Nights Festival, Perm
- 2013 Black Sea Vacations (a Biennale "Fashion and Style in Photography event), Multimedia Art Museum, Moscow
- 2014 Moscow Nightlife (Moscow Biennale of Photography event) Zurab Tsereteli Gallery, Moscow
- 2015 Children: Personal Space, Gallery Peresvetov, Moscow
- 2015 Sacred Procession (Baltic Biennial of Photography event), State Art Gallery, Kaliningrad
- 2017 Ice (screening at Artdocfest film festival), Czech Cultural Center, Moscow.
- 2017 The Last March (collaboration with Naum Medovoy), Moscow Museum of Modern Art, Moscow
- 2017 Ice, Artdocfest, Moscow
- 2020 Scan | Klaxon, 11.12 Gallery, Moscow

=== Notable group shows ===
- 2010 Self-image, Plates to Pixels Gallery, Portland, USA
- 2011 Life in Motion, International Center of Photography, New York
- 2012 The Stone Flower, National Centre for Contemporary Arts, Moscow
- 2013 Stability. Ghosts, Random gallery, Moscow
- 2013 Chernukha, RuArts gallery, Moscow
- 2013 The Happy End, Multimedia Art Museum, Moscow
- 2013 What is Behind This Curtain?, Random Gallery, Moscow
- 2014 Twelve Thinking Photographers, Manifesta 10 parallel event, First Cadets' Corpus, St. Petersburg
- 2014 Moscow. Barocco, 4th Moscow International Biennale for young art collateral event, Triumph Gallery, Moscow
- 2014 Artistic Invention of Yourself and the Pure Enjoyment of Life and Love, Austrian Cultural Forum, Moscow
- 2014 Moskovia. Research, All-Russian Decorative Art Museum, Moscow
- 2014 Young, GUP Gallery, Amsterdam
- 2014 Where Motherland Begins, Museum of History of Moscow, Moscow
- 2015 Borderlands, Gallery for Russian Arts and Design, London
- 2015 Exhibition within the 5th Photoquai Biennale, Paris
- 2015 Hope (The 6th Moscow Biennale event), Moscow
- 2016 Ice (at Fada: House of Madness art show), The Watermill Center, Water Mill, New York
- 2018 Scan (8th Tashkent International Biennale of Contemporary Art), Tashkent
- 2019 Darling Angel (an annual CalArts School of Film/Video Showcase), Redcat, Los Angeles
- 2019 Exhibition within the Anhydrite Biennale of Media Art, Germany
- 2019 Klaxon (exhibition within the CYFEST-12 in collaboration with Anna Evtiugina), Saint Petersburg
- 2020 CADAF Online
