= Hugh Livingston =

- Born: 1969 (age 56–57)
- Genres: classical music electroacoustic music
- Instrument: cello
- Years active: 1990–present
- Website: Hugh Livingston Cellist

Hugh Livingston (born 1969) is an American cellist, recording artist, composer, and site-specific sound installation artist. He specializes in improvisation, electroacoustic music, Japanese music, and collaboration with visual artists.

== Education ==
Hugh Livingston graduated cum laude from Yale with a B.A. in music in 1990. He earned his D.M.A. from UC San Diego and his M.F.A. from Cal Arts, studying under Erika Duke-Kirkpatrick. Livingston won the Yale Bach Society Prize, first prize in the Music of Japan Today competition, and first prize in the Crane School of Music competition.

== Career ==
After graduating from Yale in 1990, Livingston relocated to San Diego, California. He devoted much of his career to a composer/performer collaboration called Strings and Machines, initially a Yale research project marrying cello and electronics. Livingston is credited as a cellist on the original motion picture soundtracks of Joyride (1997), Blade II (2002), Terminator 3: Rise of the Machines (2003), I, Robot (2004), Hellboy (2004), and Flight of the Phoenix (2004) as well as the computer game SimCity 4. His expertise lies in the interpretation of contemporary Asian music, leading to the discovery of more than 100 different pizzicato techniques.

Livingston has performed both classical and contemporary repertoires as a solo artist, collecting awards and mentions as a concertizing cellist and innovator. He additionally performed as a member of three ensembles including Mapa Mundi, The Orbis Factor, and The Seven Saties, and serves as director of both ARTSHIP Recordings and Strings and Machines, organizing concerts and educational activities. Livingston has premiered works by over one hundred composers, including Jonathan Harvey, Morton Subotnick, and Roger Reynolds. In 2014, he became the fourth artist-in-residence for Dumbarton Oaks.

== Personal life ==
Livingston was raised in Knoxville, Tennessee, where he attended Tyson Middle School and West High School. He played cello in the Knoxville Youth Symphony Orchestra with classmates Jami Rogers (clarinetist and future New York Metropolitan Opera singer) and Benjamin Wade (trumpet player and future conductor).

== Discography ==
- Strings & Machines (1996)
- Tenors, Echoes and Wolves (From the Underground 1829-1998) (1997)
- Living in Fire (2000)
- Wold: A Little Girl Dreams of Taking the Veil (2001)
- Mark Applebaum: Catfish (2003)
- Roger Reynolds: Process and Passion (2004)
- Earth Music: Ten Years of Meridian Music - Composers in Performance (2010)
