= John J. Casbarian =

American architect

John J. Casbarian is an American architect, currently the Harry K. & Albert K. Smith Professor at Rice University. He is a Fellow at American Academy in Rome.

He received a B.A. ('69) and B.Arch. ('72) from Rice University and a MFA in Design from the California Institute of the Arts.

In 2002, he founded the Rice School of Architecture in Paris (RSAP), an advanced program of study for Rice graduate architecture students, located in 12th arrondissement in Paris. The program places students in the top architecture firms in Paris to be involved in year-long practicums, while they expand their cultural, political, artistic, and social horizons.
