= Tran T. Kim-Trang =

American artist

- Born: 1966 (age 59–60); Saigon, South Vietnam
- Known for: Video and Installation Art

Tran T. Kim-Trang is a Vietnamese-American artist who lives and works in Los Angeles. She works across multiple media, including video, new media, and installation. Major themes in her works include visual dynamics, immigration, biotechnology, and relationships to technology. She has exhibited work at the Museum of Modern Art (1999) and the Whitney Biennial (2000). Tran is a Professor of Art and Media at Scripps College in Claremont, California.

== Life ==
Tran was born in Saigon (now Ho Chi Minh City), Vietnam in 1966. She moved to the United States in 1975, at the age of nine. Tran received her Bachelor of Fine Arts from University of Iowa, and her Master of Fine Arts from California Institute of the Arts. In addition to her current position at Scripps College, Tran has taught art and media-related courses at multiple institutions in California since the mid-1990s, including University of California, Irvine; University of California, San Diego; Otis College of Art and Design; and California Institute of the Arts.

== Work ==
Tran’s art practice spans multiple media and approaches, including video, installation, and new media. Certain themes are repeated across her works, such as immigrant experiences, technology, and vision. She is best known for her video works, collectively titled The Blindness Series.

=== The Blindness Series ===
The Blindness Series is a series of eight experimental videos that deals with the theme of blindness and vision, produced between 1992 and 2006. In her artist statement Tran mentions the importance of vision for artists and her fear of becoming blind as motivating the work. Additionally, she has stated that the series was inspired in part by an exhibition curated by Jacques Derrida, Memoirs of the Blind, which used works from the Louvre’s collection that dealt with blindness. Each video addresses a different topic related to blindness and vision, and do not necessarily need to be viewed in order, as they are related thematically rather than by a progressing narrative.

==== Alethia ====
The first installment, Alethia, introduces the topics explored in the seven other videos of the series. It begins with an extreme close-up shot of braille, paired with the sound of screeching string instruments. Drawing from both theoretical texts and popular culture, the video examines the role of eyes and vision in relation to race, gender, and sexuality. It juxtaposes video and audio clips, such as images of Asian eyes and a punk song repeating the phrase “Lights out! Poke your eyes out!”, and various voice clips expressing racialized views of Asians related to eyes. Another scene pairs audio from Working Girls describing a sexual fantasy about blindness with a video clip of the female protagonist from 9½ Weeks engaging in blindfolded sex, with superimposed theoretical and literary text related to sight/blindness and sexual desire. Tran states that the work’s non-linear structure is intended to reflect the process of visual perception and cognition. The multi-layered, collage-like editing is also typical of video art of the 1990s.

==== Operculum ====
The second of the series, Operculum, deals with cosmetic blepharoplasty. Much of the video uses a split screen, the right side with Tran in consultation with plastic surgeons as if planning to get the procedure, and on the left scrolling text about a historical doctor, which mentions a technique for lobotomy through the eye socket, performed with an ice pick. The surgeons’ comments to Tran, comprising most of the video’s sound elements, highlight Western standards of beauty and femininity, and racialization of monolid eyes.

==== Kore ====
The third video, Kore, addresses vision and sexuality. It includes an activist speaking about women, AIDS, drug testing, and cytomegalovirus (which can cause blindness.) The video also includes a scene of two Asian women having sex while blindfolded, suggesting the ideas of feminist authors like Hélène Cixious who described feminine desire as tactile, rather than visually-based. Like Alethia, Kore incorporates multiple layers of sound and visual elements sourced from theoretical texts, popular media, and other art works.

==== Ocularis ====
Surveillance is the topic of the fourth installment, Ocularis, which uses recordings of calls to a toll-free number set up by Tran for callers to share their “fears and fantasies, as well as experiences with video surveillance.” Some of these accounts are spoken by the artist in disguised or altered voices, bringing to question the truth and source of all the experiences described. The artist also includes video recordings of herself and her guests from cameras set up in her own home. Ocularis examines the effects of surveillance on society, revealing power dynamics of visibility and people’s ambiguous relationship to watching others and being watched.

==== Ekleipsis ====
The fifth installment, Ekleipsis, focuses on “the largest group of hysterically blind people in the world,” female survivors of the Cambodian genocide living in Long Beach, California. The work combines video and narrations of text from multiple sources, including the film The Killing Fields, news reports, Freud's account of hysteria, accounts of survivors, and a “fictionalized voice” of the women.” Repetitive flashes of images are shown, evoking “the effects of visual disturbance caused by trauma” and disrupting the viewer’s search for their meaning. The scholar Fiona Ngô notes that “the film plays with what can and cannot be represented about war and trauma.”

==== Alexia ====
The sixth video, Alexia, addresses this condition, also commonly referred to as word blindness. The video includes many elements: a part where red text and images fade in and out, a white vignette featuring a finger pointing at a text label that reads “DO NOT MISTAKE THE FINGER FOR THE MOON” a reference to poet-philosopher Gongsun Long, and barely readable words alongside Moonlight Sonata and Tran’s voice disguised. Many of the images Tran used in the segment are taken from the book Understanding Visual Metaphors. The images used were shown to people first without the words, followed by a text description where they had to pick the two which were most alike.

==== Amaurosis ====
The seventh installment, Amaurosis, focuses on blind guitarist Nguyen Duc Dat through his life as an American immigrant. It is told in a documentary-like format and features Tran conversing with him by a poolside. Tran interviews Nguyen about vision, race, gender, video, and guitar. It also includes Nyugen’s playing of the guitar with Orange Country band Bayadara. Tran gifts Nyugen a flute after his expressed interest in the instrument and he creates a song six months later. The critic Lucas Hilderbrand suggests that the work “speaks to greater issues of the personal impact of geo-political conflict, of diasporic displacement, of losing sight and yet finding one’s place in the world.”

==== Epilogue: The Palpable Invisibility of Life ====
The eighth and final installment, Epilogue: The Palpable Invisibility of Life, explores family, death, and mourning. It features audio of conversation with Tran’s mother, and quotations from Derrida, both having recently died at the time of the video’s production. Both are likened to parental figures, her mother literally, and Derrida through artistic inspiration. The work also deals with imaging technologies that allowed Tran to see the development of her unborn son, reflecting her mother’s wishes to see the continuation of her family.

=== Gene Genies Worldwide ===
Gene Genies WorldWide is a collaboration between Tran and her husband, artist Karl Mihail. The public art installation was located in One Colorado Mall in Old Town Pasadena. In the work, Tran and Mihail present a fictional company with an upcoming retail storefront to that was offering services and products that enhance a client's personality. Mihail and Tran are artists who “pose as scientists who want to be artists.” The work wanted to raise the public’s awareness in biotechnology and allow them to create a conversation about the ethical issues surrounding genetic modification and consumerism.

Another part of this work, Creative Gene Harvest Archive, features a glass case with genetic hair samples from respected scientists, artists, and architects. Some notable people include: Damien Hirst, James Watson, and Mary-Claire King. On the Gene Genies website, Tran and Mihail state they intended “to harvest, store, and utilize the genetic codes for creativity from some of the most exemplary and creative individuals in order to design and imbue personalities with the same traits.”

=== Landless in Second Life ===
Landless in Second Life is a project Tran made for her mother by creating an “Afterlife”. This was inspired by her and her brothers creating a retirement fund before their mother’s death. Tran uses this to explore the lives of immigrants both in reality and as it exists online. The work consists of a triptych of Machinimas made of video footage from the game Second Life, a game in which players exist in a 3D virtual world. In this collaboration with her brothers, Tran features a house for her mother, an all giving tree, and her mother’s children.

=== Arizona 9 ===
Arizona 9 is a visual novel with puzzle elements describing the death of Brisenia Flores. It features three levels in which the user finishes puzzles of Flores and a younger Shawna Forde, one of the perpetrators who killed Flores. Tran uses a game as a way for people to engage with difficult subject matter while considering an alternative outcome to the murder. Tran also thinks about gaming as a way to reach individuals who wouldn’t know about the incident initially.

=== Movements: Battles and Solidarity ===
Movements: Battles and Solidarity is a three-channel video installation “exploring the connections between women of color and their shared socio-political and physical 'movements,'” comparing the Vietnam War, the fashion industry, and labour movements of the early 1970s. The work was installed as part of the exhibition To View A Plastic Flower at the Los Angeles Municipal Art Gallery in February 2020.

== Select exhibitions and screenings ==
- 1995: Paris Gay & Lesbian Film Festival, Paris, France
- 1996: Tapes that Think, Agnes Etherington Art Centre, Kingston, Ontario
- 1997: Surveillance Culture/Surveying Culture, San Diego Museum of Contemporary Art, San Diego, California
- 1999: 15th World Wide Video Festival, Amsterdam, Holland
- 2000: Whitney Biennial 2000, Whitney Museum of American Art, New York City, New York
- 2002: 7th Annual Women of Color Film Festival, Pacific Film Archives, Berkeley, California
- 2006: Tomorrowland: Calarts in Moving Pictures, Museum of Modern Art, New York City, New York
- 2010: Sorting Daemons: Art, Surveillance, and Social Control, Agnes Etherington Art Centre, Kingston, Ontario
- 2010: Duan Xuan Festival, Hebbel Theatre, Berlin, Germany
