= Jaklin Romine =

American multimedia artist

Jaklin Romine (born 1985) is an American multimedia artist based in Los Angeles. Working at the intersection of photography, sculpture, and performance, her work addresses family connections, trauma, and accessibility.

== Early life and education ==
Jaklin Romine was born in Burbank, California, in 1985. Her parents were both Mexican American, and she also has Scottish ancestry on her father's side. She grew up in East Los Angeles and the San Gabriel Valley, and has continued to live and work in and around Los Angeles.

Romine uses a wheelchair after being paralyzed in a traffic accident at age 21. After her accident, she began taking advanced photography classes at Pasadena City College.

She later earned a bachelor's in studio arts from California State University, Los Angeles, followed by a master's of fine art, with a focus on photography, from the California Institute of the Arts in 2017. While there, she faced barriers to her work due to the school's photo lab being inaccessible. She initially did not seek to make art about her disability, but her experience in graduate school drove her to address the subject.

== Career ==
Romine started out as a photographer, receiving her first camera from her grandmother at age 8, and beginning to formally study the discipline at age 18. She now works at the intersection of photography, sculpture, installation art, and performance. She seeks to add three-dimensionality to photography, including through printing images on fabric and draping it over sculptures, which she has called "fabric photography."

In 2019, she received a Rema Hort Mann Foundation Emerging Artist Grant, on the basis of photographs she took while trying to sue CalArts, her alma mater, for being inaccessible. With this grant, she produced two projects that she exhibited at the PSLA studio later in 2019. One of the projects, Living With Sci, explores her experience with paralysis.

Another project she exhibited at PSLA, Why bring me flowers when I’m dead? When you had the time to do it when I was alive, documents the flowers she would give to her grandmother, as a way of preserving them. She further explored this relationship, after her grandmother's death, in the project She Breathes in Dirt and Exhales Flowers/Mejor Sola Que Mal Acompañada, which combined the flower motif with her late grandmother's own clothing.

Romine gained wider recognition for her performance piece ACCESS DENIED, which confronts the inaccessibility of galleries in Los Angeles. For the performance, she sits outside an inaccessible art space for the length of an event, such as a gallery opening, emphasizing their exclusion of people with disabilities. When events were not being held due to the COVID-19 pandemic, she instead made banners to hang outside the inaccessible galleries. Also during the pandemic lockdown, her work was included in We Are Here / Here We Are, an exhibition in public spaces across Los Angeles County.

In 2022, ACCESS DENIED was included in an exhibition at the United Nations, in connection with the International Day of Persons with Disabilities.

Her work as has also appeared in shows at various museums and galleries, including Chaffey College's Wignall Museum, the Mexican Consulate, Rio Hondo College, the Los Angeles Municipal Art Gallery, Noysky Projects, Gallery 825, and Flux Factory. It has also appeared in publications such as the New York Times, Hyperallergic, and the Los Angeles Times. She has compiled her photography into a zine, which has been featured at several zine festivals.

== Personal life ==
Romine is queer and Latinx.
