= Fred Worden =

Fred Worden, filmmaker, has been involved in experimental cinema since the 1970s. His work has been screened at The Museum of Modern Art, in the 2002 Whitney Biennial, The Centre Pompidou, in Paris, The Pacific Film Archive, The New York Film Festival, The London Film Festival, The Rotterdam International Film Festival, The Toronto Film Festival, and The Hong Kong International Film Festival. He was an editor for Criss-Cross Art Communications from the '70s through the '80s and his writings have appeared in Cinematograph. His work is included in the Stan Brakhage Collection, the Austrian Museum, The Centre Pompidou and others. Worden's work develops out of his interest in intermittent projection as the source of cinema's primordial powers: how a stream of still pictures passing through a projector at a speed meant to overwhelm the eyes might be harnessed to purposes other than representation or naturalism.

He received his MFA in film, from the California Institute of the Arts.

The Academy Film Archive preserved Four Frames and Throbs by Worden.

== Filmography ==
=== 16mm films ===
- THROBS (1972, color, sound, 7 min.)
- NOW, YOU CAN DO ANYTHING (with Chris Langdon, 1973, color, sound, 6min.)
- VENUSVILLE (with Chris Langdon, 1973, color, sound, 10min.)
- FOUR FRAMES (1976, color, silent, 10min.)
- BON AMI (1977, color, silent, 6.5min.)
- VUDOO (ca.1977-78, color, silent, 14min.)
- PANOVISION (1979, color, silent, 11min.)
- VENETIAN BLIND (ca.1979, color, sound, 10min.)
- TERRIFIC MEASURES (1980, color, silent, 5.5min.)
- INSOMNIA (1981, b/w, silent, 6min.)
- IN & OUT (1983, color, silent, 4min.)
- HERE, THERE, NOW, LATER (1983, color, silent, 3min.)
- PLOTTING THE GREY SCALE: 2 OR 3 QUICK TRAVERSES (1985, b/w, silent, 7min.)
- LURE (1986, color, sound, 7min.)
- HOW THE HELL I RIPPED JACK GOLDSTEIN’S PAINTING IN THE ELEVATOR (1986, b/w, sound, 23min.)
- BOULEVARD (1989, b/w, sound, 9min.)
- BREAKOUT (1990, color, sound, 10min.)
- INTRODUCTION TO THE SECRET SOCIETY (1992, color & b/w, sound, 9min.)
- THIS OLD HOUSE (1993)
- ONE (1998, b/w, silent, 25min.)
- AUTOMATIC WRITING 2 (2000, b/w, silent, 12min.)
- THE OR CLOUD (2001, b/w, silent, 7min.)
- IF ONLY (2003, b/w, silent, 7min.)

=== Digital works ===
- AMONGST THE PERSUADED (2004, 23min.)
- BLUE POLE(S) (2005, 20min.)
- HERE (2005, 11min.)
- EVERYDAY BAD DREAM (2006, 6min.)
- TIME'S ARROW (2007, 11min.)
- NORTH SHORE (2007, 11min.)
- THE AFTER LIFE (VICTORIA'S SECRET VERSION) (2007, 15min.)
- WHEN WORLDS COLLUDE (2008, 13min.)
- 1859 (2008, 11min.)
- ALL MY LIFE (2009, 20min.)
- POSSESSED (2010, 9min.)
- ALL OR NOTHING (2012, 8.5min.)
