= Steven Fonti =

American cartoonist

- Occupations: Animator; storyboard artist; writer
- Years active: 1993–present

Steven Fonti, also known as Steve Fonti, is an animator, writer, director and storyboard artist. He has written, directed, and storyboarded selected episodes of SpongeBob SquarePants, The Simpsons, and Family Guy, and worked in the art department on SpongeBob SquarePants and Family Guy, as well as such movies as Over the Hedge, Eight Crazy Nights, Cinderella III: A Twist in Time, Pooh's Heffalump Movie, Osmosis Jones, and Madagascar: Escape 2 Africa.

Fonti studied character animation at the California Institute of the Arts, where he produced a parody of Schoolhouse Rock! called Political Correction with fellow student Jory Prum in 1995. The film was part of Spike and Mike's Festival of Animation in 1997. His 1993 student film Yes Timmy, There is a Santa Claus was included in the 1998 Spike and Mike's Sick & Twisted festival.
