= Lecia Dole-Recio =

American artist (born 1971)

Lecia Dole-Recio (born 1971, San Francisco, CA) is an American artist based in Los Angeles, California. Dole-Recio received a Bachelor of Fine Arts at Rhode Island School of Design in 1994 and a Master of Fine Arts at the Art Center College of Design, Pasadena in 2011. Dole-Recio's work incorporates abstract painting into layered collage pieces, utilizing paper and cardboard cut-outs. She is currently an art program faculty member at CalArts.

Her mother was a designer and her father a painter.
