= Sande Cohen =

American historian (born 1946)

Sande Cohen (born 1946, in San Francisco, California) is a historian and a professor emeritus from the School of Critical Studies at the California Institute of the Arts. His teaching focused on history and historiography.

Cohen received a B.A. (1969) and M.A. (1970) from San Francisco State University and a Ph.D. (1976) in history from UCLA. Among his publications are:

- History Out of Joint: Essays on the Use and Abuse of History, Johns Hopkins Press, 2006.
- Historical Culture (1986, UC Press)
- Academia and the Luster of Capital (Minnesota, 1993)

A special issue of the journal Rethinking History (v. 12, 2008) published essays on Cohen's writings.
