= Christina Fernandez (photographer) =

American photographer (born 1965)

- Born: 1965 (age 60–61)
- Education: UCLA (B.A.); California Institute of the Arts (M.F.A.)
- Known for: Photography
- Notable work: Maria's Great Expedition, Bend, Lavanderia, Untitled Farmworker, Multiple Exposures
- Movement: Chicano Art, Latinx Art, Photography
- Awards: Latinx Artist Fellowship, US Latinx Art Forum

Christina Fernandez (born 1965) is an American photographer. She is an associate professor and co-chair of the photography department at Cerritos College.

== Biography ==
Fernandez earned a Bachelor of Arts from the University of California, Los Angeles in 1989 and an MFA from California Institute of the Arts in 1996.

Based in Los Angeles, her works deal with social and political commentary. Social consciousness and her Mexican heritage often influence her photography and collages, along with themes of space, migration, immigration, labor, gender, and her own relationship to the city of Los Angeles.

Fernandez has received many awards and fellowships, including a Fellowship for Visual Arts in 2011 from the California Community Foundation.

Her photographs are held in numerous museum collections including the Smithsonian American Art Museum. Since 2007, Fernandez's work has frequently been featured in exhibits at Gallery Luisotti in Santa Monica.

Christina’s work examines the intersections between private and public space, personal and historical narratives, ex-urban and city spaces and the cultural border and historical relationships between the United States and Mexico.

Some of her work depicting mythical and historical figures are part of the oeuvre of her early works (Maria’s Great Expedition (1995 -1996) and the Ruin (1999 – 2000) series).

In 2024, her work was on view at the Pérez Art Museum Miami, Florida, as part of Xican-a.o.x. Body, a comprehensive group exhibition on the contributions by Chicano artists to contemporary culture with artworks from the 1960s to the present time. An accompanying publication of same title was released by Chicago University Press.

== Selected works ==
=== María's Great Expedition (1995–96) ===
Maria's Great Expedition (1996-1997) at the Smithsonian American Art Museum in 2023

María's Great Expedition (1995–96) is a reenactment of Fernandez own family history interwoven with America's history. Through six photographs of staged scenes and a map, Fernandez reimagines the story of her great-grandmother, a single mother who migrated from Mexico to Southern California. The scenes reference stories about the formidable challenges of starting anew in an unfamiliar place. By employing various costumes and printing techniques, Fernandez signals the passage of time. She also provides intimate narratives that offer insight into the circumstances of that time and challenge stereotypes about immigrants.

=== Sereno (2006) ===
The Sereno series (2006) was shot in El Sereno, in northeast Los Angeles, a working-class Mexican and Mexican American neighborhood. It describes Fernandez’s role as a participant in the gentrification of the area since the 2008 housing bubble burst. Fernandez conveys a sense of homelessness, of something lost, missing, or unattainable through the images by photographing in-between spaces where the refuse of outdated household items was dumped and people who could not afford even this modest community were forced to live outside. Sereno is absent of human figures and describes human presence through things left behind. By foregrounding the refuse against the backdrop of neighborhood homes, Sereno asks, “Who is this place for? Who has access? Who does not?”

=== Lavanderia (2002) ===
Lavanderia #1 (2002) at the National Gallery of Art in 2023

Lavanderia depicts a series of laundromat windows in the Boyle Heights neighborhood of Los Angeles. Fernandez says of the project: “The window is a membrane, because the outside and the inside are delineated by that graffiti. The paint etched into the glass, and was drippy at the same time, so it had the appearance of visual violence in a way, but it’s also very beautiful.” She adds: “I became interested in the aesthetic because I was living in Boyle Heights in the mid-1990s, and the prices of family homes have just skyrocketed. It’s going to become problematic for people. It has become problematic for the people.”

== Solo Exhibitions ==
- Christina Fernandez: Multiple Exposures (a thirty-year survey), DePaul Art Museum, Chicago, IL, Princeton University Art Museum, NJ, San Jose Museum of Art, CA, Amon Carter Museum of American Art, Fort Worth, TX, California Museum of Photography, Riverside, CA, Scottsdale Museum of Contemporary Art, AZ, 2022-2025
- Subdivision, Gallery Luisotti, 2023
- Under the Sun, Benton Museum of Art, Claremont, CA, 2022
- Christina Fernandez: Survey, Gallery Luisotti, Santa Monica, CA 2020
- Prospect, Gallery Luisotti, Santa Monica, CA, 2017
- Residue, Gallery Luisotti, Santa Monica, CA, 2010
- Inside and Out, Gallery Luisotti, Santa Monica, CA, 2006
- Space Available, Voz Alta, San Diego, CA, 2004
- Lavanderia, Gallery Luisotti, Santa Monica, CA, 2003
- Artist Projects Series, Pomona College Museum of Art, Pomona, CA, 2003
- Excerpts from Recent Work, Orange Coast College, Costa Mesa, CA, 2000
- Ruin, Los Angeles Center For Photographic Studies, 1999
- The Body is an Analog & Bend: Two works on sight, California State University Northridge, 1998
- Sin Cool/Without Cool, Daniel Saxon Gallery, LA, CA, 1993
- Hidden Crimson, Daniel Saxon Gallery, LA, CA, 1992

== Public Collections ==
- Alta Med Collection
- Amon Carter Museum of Art, Texas
- Art Gallery of New Wales, Sydney, Australia
- Benton Museum, California
- California Museum of Photography, Riverside, CA
- Chicano Art Collectors Anonymous
- The Capital Group
- Creative Artists Agency
- Fogg Museum of Art, MA
- Hammer Museum, Los Angeles, CA
- Hood Museum of Art, NH
- J. Paul Getty Museum, Los Angeles CA
- Gregory Gooding
- David Knaus
- LACMA, Los Angeles County Museum of Art, CA
- Mexican Museum, San Francisco, CA
- Milwaukee Art Museum, WI
- Museum of Fine Art, MFA Houston, TX
- MOCA, Museum of Contemporary Art, Los Angeles, CA
- MoMA, Museum of Modern Art, NY
- Museum of Latin-American Art, CA
- National Gallery of Art, Washington D.C.
- Nelson Atkins Museum, Kansas City, MO
- Princeton Museum of Art, NJ
- San Antonio Museum of Contemporary Art, TX
- SFMOMA, San Francisco Museum of Modern Art, CA
- Sheldon Museum of Art, NE
- Smithsonian Museum of Art, Washington D.C.
- USC/Fischer Gallery, CA
- Whitney Museum of Art, NY
- Williams College Museum of Art, MA
