= Judie Bamber =

American artist (born 1961)

- Born: 1961 (age 64–65); Detroit, Michigan, US
- Education: California Institute of the Arts
- Known for: Painting
- Awards: City of Los Angeles Individual Artist Fellowship (2008); California Community Foundation Fellowship (2008); Richard Diebenkorn Teaching Fellowship (2012)

Judie Bamber (born 1961) is an American artist in Los Angeles. Her often representational paintings explore themes of gender, sexuality, temporality, and memory. She teaches in the Master of Fine Arts program at Otis College of Art and Design and is best known for Are You My Mother?, featured in New American Paintings in 2003 and 2004. Her paintings, watercolors, and graffiti emphasize women's pleasure and permeate her family history.

== Early life and education ==
Bamber was born in Detroit, Michigan, in 1961. She received her BFA from California Institute of the Arts in 1983.

=== Works ===
Bamber creates figurative paintings and drawings based on photographic sources ranging from images of female genitalia to seascapes. Her early work included still lifes in which objects, painted to scale, floated in front of monochromatic color fields. In the mid-1990s, in a collection of works without a name, she painted photorealistic "portraits" of vaginas. In 2002, Bamber began a series of seascapes, making initial plain-air watercolor sketches that she used for oil paintings. From 2005 to 2014, she worked on the project Are You My Mother?, consisting of small-scale representational watercolors and graphite drawings based on posed erotic and fashion like Polaroids, her father took of her mother in the 1960s.

== Awards ==
- 2008: City of Los Angeles (C.O.L.A.) Individual Artist Fellowship
- 2008: California Community Foundation Fellowship

== Exhibitions ==
=== Selected solo shows ===
- Gorney Bravin + Lee, New York, NY (2004)
- Pomona College Museum of Art, Project Series 26 (2005)
- Angles Gallery, Los Angeles, CA (2008)
- Are You My Mother?, Angles Gallery (2011)

=== Selected group exhibitions ===
- Women by Women, Heiner Contemporary, Washington, D.C. (2011)
- Sexual Politics: Judy Chicago's Dinner Part in Feminist Art History, Hammer Museum, Los Angeles (1996)
