= Asher Hartman =

American dramatist

Asher Hartman is a multidisciplinary artist, author, and playwright based in Los Angeles. His work often explores personal and emotional history in relation to the ideologies that structure Western culture. Trained in theater as an undergraduate at UCLA, Hartman later received an MFA in art from CalArts. Hartman's plays eschew linear narrative, opting for more experimental approaches to meaning-making. He has cited Richard Schechner and The Living Theatre as influences, as well as the contemporary performance landscape in Los Angeles. Hartman's work has been shown at LACMA, Los Angeles Contemporary Exhibitions (LACE), and Machine Project, among other venues.

In 2020, the Los Angeles based publishing house X Artist Books' published a monograph on Hartman titled Mad Clot on a Holy Bone: Memories of a Psychic Theater.
