= Kevin Bjorke =

American artist

Kevin Allen Bjorke is an American artist, photographer, writer, and media evangelist for NVIDIA Corporation, based in the Silicon Valley. His work has ranged from print advertising to video games, major motion pictures to computer books and fiction. He has been a regular art lecturer at events such as SIGGRAPH since the mid-1980s.

== Education ==
Bjorke graduated from California Institute of the Arts, splitting his program between the School of Film/Video (with emphasis on cinematography) and the School of Theatre (acting). He also spent time at UCLA, USC, the University of Minnesota, and AFI.

== Career ==
=== Film work ===
Bjorke supervised imaging and lighting for the films Final Fantasy: The Spirits Within and The Last Flight of the Osiris. He was also a technical director and lead layout artist for the films A Bug's Life and Toy Story. Additionally, he built the 3D graphics studio and software for the film adaptation of Super Mario Bros.. He has worked extensively in television, is a member of ATAS and IATSE, and has won a number of awards for his TV commercials and rock videos for artists like Mick Jagger. Awards have included film festivals "Best Animation" awards, Billboard Awards, and multiple consecutive Clio Awards. In the 1990s, he worked at length in Paris with Philippe Druillet on a feature-animated film based on Lone Sloane, which was shelved after budget difficulties for the sponsoring studio Acteurs Auteurs Associés/Soprofilms.

=== Theme parks ===
Bjorke has contributed to several theme park attractions, creating "ride films" such as The Funtastic World of Hanna-Barbera for Universal Studios Orlando, test rides for Disneyland, and two stereo rides for Sanrio in Chiba City and Ōita Japan.

=== Games ===
In gaming, Bjorke has worked with Sinclair, Atari, Square, and Pixar in a variety of lead roles. In the mid-1980s he also developed, with Timothy Leary and several other artists including Keith Haring, William S. Burroughs, Mark Mothersbaugh, and Helmut Newton, a prototype "Mind Movie" based on the William Gibson novel Neuromancer. This project was eventually scrapped and redirected by Atari, who felt that it was much too ambitious and the hardware requirements would make the available market of game-players purchasers far too small.

Bjorke created an early adjunct to the Palace virtual worlds system, and one of the earliest web cgi apps. The "BotBot" enabled Palace users to customize the automated backends of their avatars and at the height of Palace popularity often served thousands of users daily.

=== Writing and public speaking ===
As a journalist, Bjorke has contributed to Little Bit Magazine and produced segments for ABC Television News in Minneapolis. He has been a member of the Science Fiction and Fantasy Writers of America, serving for a time on the SFWA's publisher-grievances committee. He was a contributor to The RenderMan Companion and more recently served as a section editor and author for the GPU Gems series of graphics programming books. He has written for 3D Artist magazine, for Develop magazine in the UK, and CGWorld Japan.

His photography has recently illustrated magazine pages for Springer Verlag, advertising related to his own projects, and was included in a feature of the February 2006 B&W Magazine.

Bjorke writes, principally about photography, at PhotoRant.com, and maintains a web community focused on Photographic First Amendment issues, PhotoPermit.Org. He continues to lecture on game design, art, and technology at events such as GDC and worldwide for NVIDIA Corporation.
