= Chris Langdon =

American artist

Chris Langdon (born 1952) is an American artist based in Los Angeles who produced a large body of work in many media, including painting, sculpture, graphics, assemblage, photography, film, and video.

== Biography ==
While attending California Institute of the Arts from 1971-76 in the Film (BFA) and Art (MFA) schools, Chris was extremely prolific, in particular producing about forty 16mm and 35mm films, in addition to assisting artists Robert Nelson, John Baldessari, and Jack Goldstein in the production of some of their films.

Chris's film work was influenced by, but also satirized tendencies in the Los Angeles art world toward conceptual and structural work. Most of her film work makes extensive use of lively and unexpected humor and employs the tropes of so-called "low" culture. Including corny references and pulp media, to make biting critiques and comments on (and devilish subversions of) the ways in which we ingest images, and what our minds then do with them.

For instance, the film Bondage Boy (1973) uses an absurd and unlikely bondage setup as a satire on structuralism, while a phony post-mortem documentary on Picasso (Picasso (1973)) allows us to question the authority of images. This is the Brain of Otis Crawfield (1973) could be seen as a damning statement on both the Anglo co-opting of African-American culture and humanity, as well as a send-up of superficial "emotional" pieces that use clichéd cinematic tricks to manipulate audience reaction. Another film, Love Hospital Trailer (ca.1975) presents a series of goofy romantic and pseudo-professional interludes among its all-male cast in the guise of a soap opera TV spot.

Chris ended a long initial string of filmmaking in about 1976, and retired from making art in 1994. In 2008, she resumed painting.

The Academy Film Archive has preserved a number of Chris Langdon's films, including Bondage Girl, Picasso, and Choppers.

== Partial filmography ==
All films are 16mm unless noted. Several films are lost, a handful of which are not listed here due to lack of information.

- Go Oh Wow (1972, color, sound, 6 min.)
- My Girdle My God (ca.1972, color, sound, 15 min., never shown)
- Bondage Boy (1973, color, sound, 5.5 min.)
- Bondage Girl (1973, color, sound, 6 min.) (aka Immaculate Gate)
- Now, You Can Do Anything (made with Fred Worden, 1973, color, sound, 5.5 min.)
- Picasso (April 8, 1973, b/w, sound, 3 min.)
- The Gypsy Cried (1973, b/w, sound, 3 min.)
- This is the Brain of Otis Crawfield (1973, b/w, sound, 4 min.)
- Two Faces Have I (1973, b/w, sound, 3 min.)
- Venusville (made with Fred Worden, 1973, color, sound, 10 min.)
- Intermittent Transposition (ca. 1973-4, color, sound, 6 min.)
- The Plant Film (ca.1973-4, b/w, silent, 9 min.)
- Fun (ca.1974, b/w, sound, ca. 18 min., currently lost)
- 999 BOY (1974, b/w, sound, 10 min.) (aka Express Implication)
- My Laser (ca. 1974, color, sound, 5 min.)
- The Surf Caster’s Story (ca. 1974, b/w, sound, 4 min.)
- Thin Premises (1974, color, sound, 5 min.) (aka I’ve Seen Hundreds of Movies 2, 5, 10, 20 Times or More as Long as This, Based on Thinner Premises)
- Swimming Pool (ca. 1974, ca. 30 min. – currently lost, no other info known)
- Choppers (ca. 1975, 35mm, color, sound, 4 min.)
- Go Cart (1975, b/w, sound, 3 min.)
- Interview With an Artist (ca. 1975, b/w, sound, 14 min.) (aka Mitch Speaks)
- The Last Interview With P. Passolini [sic] (1975, b/w, sound, 6 min.)
- Love Hospital Trailer (ca. 1975, color, sound, 3 min.)
