= Mike L. Murphy =

American film director

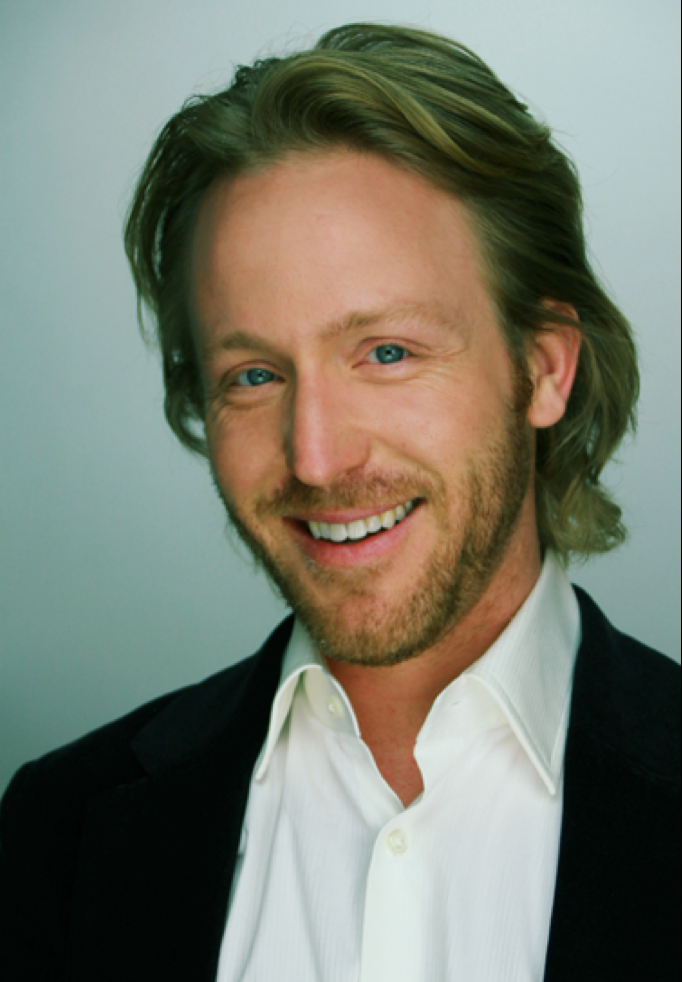
- Born: Micheal L. Murphy; January 29, 1975; Los Gatos, California, United States
- Occupations: Film maker Animation director Animator
- Employer: Quality Machining

Mike L. Murphy (born January 29, 1975, in Los Gatos, California) is an American animation director and animator in film and television.

== Background ==
Murphy grew up in Los Gatos, California, and left high school a year early after getting a tour of Walt Disney Feature Animation studios while they were making Aladdin. He subsequently attended California Institute of the Arts in Valencia, California.

== Career ==
Murphy's first film as director was his 2004 Night of the Broccoli, about a man whose dinner vegetables exact a revenge. This was followed by his 2005 film Get Lost, and then by his 2006 film Rose, which premiered at the Rhode Island International Film Festival, and won 1st place for cinematography. His works include the films Harry Potter and the Sorcerer's Stone, The Lord of the Rings: The Two Towers, and Iron Man. In 2010 he directed the animated sequences for 20th Century Fox's Diary of a Wimpy Kid. In 2011 he was the director and producer of the Young Storytellers Foundation "Bohemian Dream Party", a charity event to benefit arts education for Los Angeles–based youth. He also redesigned Mrs. Butterworth and directed her animation.

== Filmography ==
- Night of the Broccoli (2004)
- Get Lost (2005)
- Rose (2006)
