= Karl Montevirgen =

American experimental guitar composer

Karl Montevirgen (born August 10, 1969) is an American composer who specializes in improvisational, experimental guitar work. Karl Montevirgen's album "War Machines" was released in 2007 on the Black Phone label. Karl has organized the (Un-)mapping of the Electric Guitar event in Eagle Rock, California that brought his guitar works together with those of Michael Pisaro, Rick Cox, Chas Smith, Jeremy Drake and Michael Jon Fink. He has performed at the Earjam 3 in Pasadena's Furious Theatre Space curated by Julie Adler. His collaborative work with artist and filmmaker Chris Peters in their film "Captain Scurvy" has been put on exhibition at Berlin's Artbang 2008. Karl has participated in the so.cal.sonic sound. Commons Orchestra in Long Beach, California in 2005. Other venues that have featured his improvisational work have been "Line Space Line" and "Dangerous Curve Gallery" in downtown Los Angeles.
