= Young Kakit =

Chinese artist

Young Kakit (simplified Chinese: 杨嘉杰; traditional Chinese: 楊嘉傑; born 1958 in Hong Kong, China) is a Chinese contemporary artist. His work is Landscape: 100 New Sceneries.

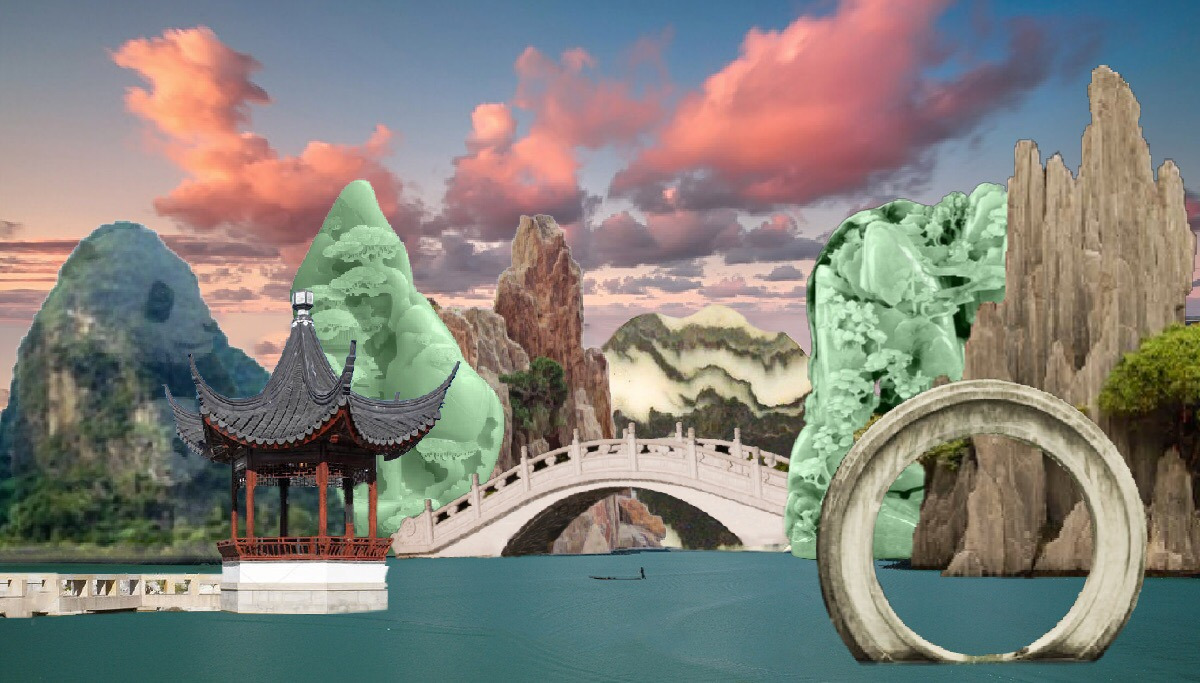
Chinese Garden, Heaven's Lake, China.

== Work and career ==
Young Kakit received BFA and MFA degrees from California Institute of the Arts in 1981 and 1983 respectively. His work has been exhibited in the Hong Kong Art Centre, the Whitney Museum of American Art and the New Museum of Contemporary Art. His work has also been published in New Arts in China, Art in America and Artforum. He is an active member of the Epoxy art group between 1990 and 1994.

Inspired by the beauty and aesthetics of traditional Chinese landscape paintings, but employing modern photomontage techniques in the art making process, landscape: 100 New Sceneries is a photographic creation of natural monuments around the world.
