= Joaquin "Kino" Gil =

American film director

Joaquin Gerardo Gil Quesada (born May 1, 1952) is a filmmaker (producer, director, writer, editor and special-effect/animation artist) known for the creation of "animation-rich" feature films, where live actors interact on animated, usually computer-generated imagery environments. He had worked on films such as Starship Troopers, Contact and Godzilla as part of Sony Imageworks before starting the creation of his own "niche" films in the year 2000.

A graduate of the Film M.F.A. program at California Institute of the Arts (1997), Kino studied visual arts with Jules Engel, Ed Emshwiller, Vibeke Sorensen and Michael Scroggins. His Electro-acoustic Music studies were under Morton Subotnick and Mark Waldrep. He has also a degree in Social Anthropology from the Universidad de Costa Rica (1971).

His earliest recorded work occurs in Costa Rica with the Centro Costarricense de Produccion Cinematografica, where he participates in the creation of the Center's first three documentaries on bio-diversity and conservation. Gil has written and registered with WGA West (Los Angeles, California) seven screenplays for film and video, and has two unpublished Steampunk novels as of May 2010, "Gatekeeper" and "Castle Griffon", as well as numerous artistic and technical articles for film, imagery and animation themes published on print and the Web.

Mr. Gil is the director and creator of the Vasst Training DVD: "Video Editing Master Class" Editing on the Right Side of the Brain" on sale on the Internet -

A creator of fantasy and science fiction, Joaquin wrote, produced, directed, edited and created the animation for the feature films "Zipacna" (2006) premiered at the Egyptian Theatre in Hollywood on May 9, 2006, (in limited distribution) and "The Outsider" (2008) winner of the Best Sci-Fi Film Heart Award from the Heart of England International Film Fest 2008 and the "Festival Choice Award" from the Paso Robles Digital Film Festival 2008.

Joaquin is also very active as an artist in the field of Abstract Animation. His stark B&W piece "Mecanismo" (2007) was a selected finalist in the 2008 "Punto Y Raya" animation festival from MAD/Actions, Spain.

== Personal life ==
Married to Giselle Calderon et author, educator and actress Gloria Rodriguez-Gil in 1998. Daughter

== Works ==
- Works Website
- 3D Short "By Night"
