= Cindy Im =

American actress

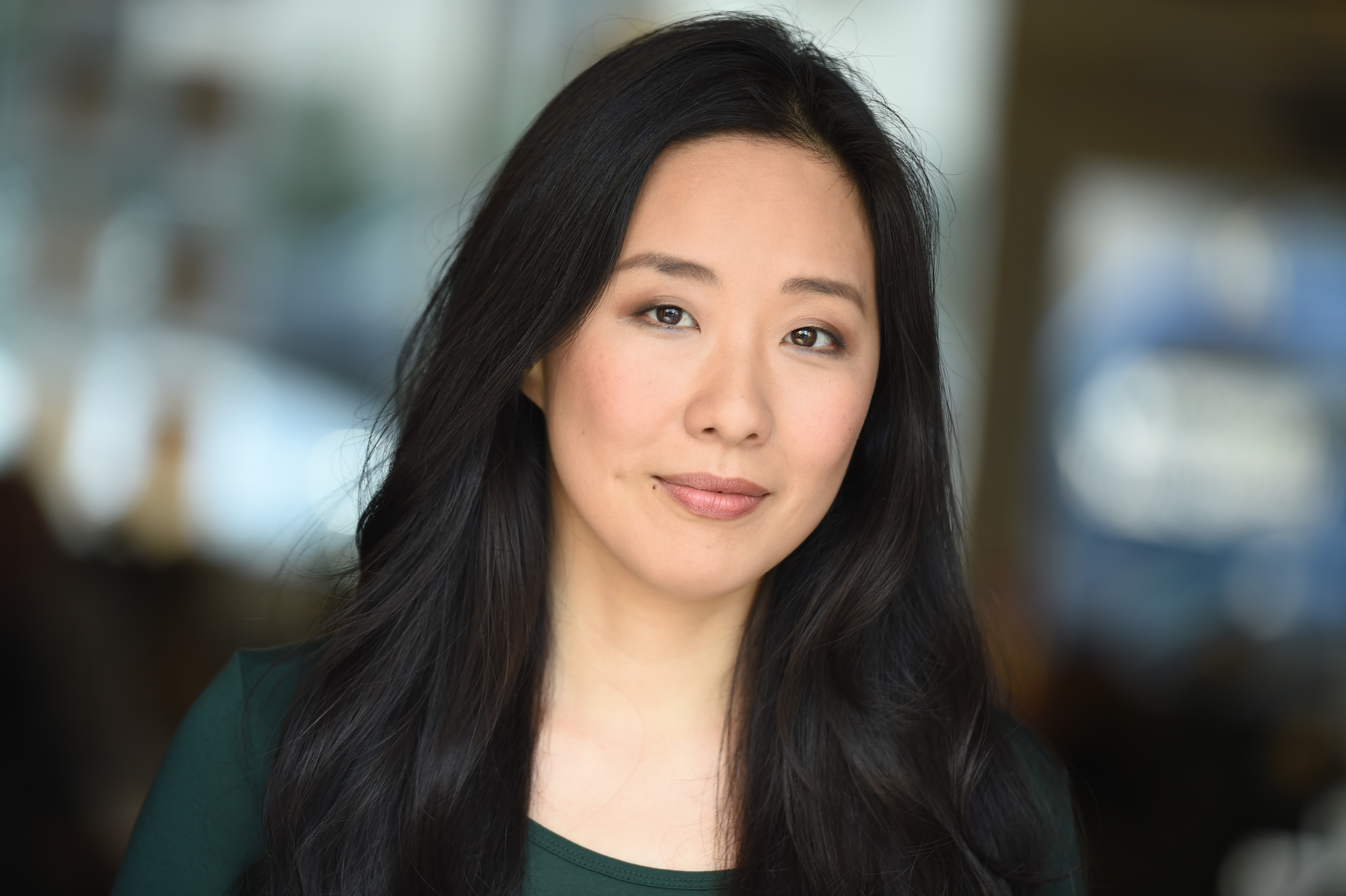
Cindy Im

Cindy Im is an American actress, most notable for her roles in Manifest, as Hannah in the world premiere of Hannah and the Dread Gazebo at the Oregon Shakespeare Festival, and as Lizzie Darcy in the world premiere of Lauren Gunderson and Margot Melcon's Miss Bennet: Christmas at Pemberley at Marin Theatre Company.

== Education ==
Im received a bachelor's degree from the University of California at Berkeley and an MFA in Acting from California Institute of the Arts.

== Career ==
Im has performed across the United States, as well as throughout France (most notably at the Théâtre National de la Colline in Paris). She has appeared on the stages of American Conservatory Theater, Goodman Theatre, California Shakespeare Theater, and La Jolla Playhouse. She played the role of Perdita in The Winter's Tale in the first Shakespeare production at the Oregon Shakespeare Festival with a primarily Asian cast in the lead roles.

Im is a recipient of the Fox Foundation Resident Actor Fellowship through Theatre Communications Group and the William and Eva Fox Foundation.

In 2014, Im portrayed both Viola and Sebastian California Shakespeare Theater's all-female production of Twelfth Night. KQED wrote "Cindy Im is a bright and passionate Viola, beautifully capturing the character’s keen intelligence, but also her fear of being discovered and her indignation on her master’s behalf".

Of Im's portrayal of Perdita in The Winter's Tale in 2016, Bohemian.com wrote: "As Leontes' abandoned daughter Perdita (Cindy Im, breathtakingly good) comes to adulthood in a foreign country, the forces of fate and soft-heartedness conspire to bring two broken families back together again. Rarely has The Winter's Tale made so much emotional sense, or been so devastatingly, lovingly and magically transformed into what we imagine Shakespeare, late in his life, intended: a thing of sweet, life-affirming beauty".

In 2018, Im portrayed multiple roles in American Conservatory Theater's Vietgone. The San Francisco Examiner wrote: "With Im, Hu and Tagatac excelling in supporting roles, it’s a fast-paced show, and director Jaime Castañeda keeps it firing on all cylinders".

== Performance history ==
Roles
Year	Title	Role	Producing Organization
2018	Manifest	DARPA Scientist	NBC/Warner Brothers
2018	Tigertail	Quiet Asian Woman	Netflix
2018	Vietgone	Huong, Thu, Translator, Flower Girl and others	American Conservatory Theater
2017	Hannah and the Dread Gazebo	Hannah	Oregon Shakespeare Festival
2017	Julius Caesar	Artimedorus	Oregon Shakespeare Festival
2016	Miss Bennet: Christmas at Pemberley	Lizzie Darcy	Marin Theatre Company
2016	The Winter's Tale	Perdita	Oregon Shakespeare Festival
2016	Great Expectations	Biddy	Oregon Shakespeare Festival
2014	The Orphan of Zhao	Princess's Maid and others	American Conservatory Theater, La Jolla Playhouse
