= Amanda Yates Garcia =

American writer

- Born: United States
- Occupation: Writer
- Writing career
- Genre: Non-fiction

Amanda Yates Garcia is an American witch, healer, and medium among other New Age practices, and is known as the "Oracle of Los Angeles". She is also a full-time witch and life coach. Yates Garcia promotes oneness with nature to save the world.

== History ==
She has been active since at least 2013 and resides in Los Angeles, California, U.S. She completed a bachelor's degree at City College of New York, as well as graduate school at California Institute of Arts. As of 2019 she was working on her PhD thesis.

In 2017 she appeared on the Tucker Carlson Tonight regarding her binding spell she had put onto Donald Trump to galvanize change symbolically in order to stop him from harming people; Carlson mocked her but she deflected his remarks.

She is the author of Initiated: Memoir of a Witch written in 2019. An interview with Garcia in The Believer described the book as "[A] feminist history of witchcraft, a work of critical theory, an activist manifesto, a personal mythology, and a memoir ...".
