= Gregg Wager =

American composer

Gregg Wager (born September 16, 1958 in Adrian, Michigan) is an American composer, pianist, and music critic. He studied composition at the University of Southern California and the California Institute of the Arts. His teachers included Morton Subotnick and Morten Lauridsen. His piano teachers included Yuriy Oliynyk, Doris Stevenson, and Chester Swiatkowski. In 1996, he earned a Ph.D. in musicology at the Free University Berlin.

As a critic, he specializes in contemporary classical music and postmodern music. From 1985 to 1991, he contributed regularly to the Los Angeles Times. In a 2001 article for the New York Times, "Going the Way of the Victrola," Wager advocated for the P2P community and the fall of the importance of the recording studio.

Wager's musical influences vary from traditional forms of American and classical music to minimalism, jazz, rock music, and even serialism. He especially is influenced by Karlheinz Stockhausen and the relationships between pitch and tempo, timbre and rhythm.

After serving as an adjunct professor at Purchase College and for a year as a guest lecturer at the Korea National University of Arts, in 2008 he enrolled in law school after not finding more permanent teaching positions. He earned a JD at McGeorge School of Law in 2014.

== Books ==
- Symbolism as a Compositional Method in the Works of Karlheinz Stockhausen (1998). ISBN 0-9665850-0-3

== Publications (selective list) ==
- "Symbolische Aspekte der Formel-Komposition." Neue Zeitschrift für Musik. No. 4, Jul./Aug. 2003: 42-4.
- "Going the Way of the Victrola." New York Times. Vol. 150, No. 51,661, 11 Feb. 2001: Sec. 2, 32+.
- "Tracing the Origins of Alabama Song: A look at the meaning of a song by Bertolt Brecht and Kurt Weill as interpreted by The Doors." Doors Collectors Magazine. Ed. Kerry Humphreys. Apr.-Oct. 1996: 15-20.
- "A Composer's 'Aura': The Musical Language of York Höller." Chicago Symphonic Times. Ed. John Henken. Fall 1995: 4-7.
- "Improvisational Tribute to Longo Works." Los Angeles Times. 8 Nov. 1989: F8.
- "A 'White Rose' Blooms From Troubled Earth." Los Angeles Times. 6 Nov. 1988, Sunday Calendar: 60+.
- "Post-Modern Music: 'Condominium of Babel.' " Los Angeles Times. 13 Feb. 1988, part VI: 5+.
- "Land Grab." L. A. Weekly. 11–17 July 1986: 16.
- "New Music America '85 Comes to L.A." Los Angeles Times. 27 Oct. 1985, Sunday Calendar: 50+.

== Musical Compositions (selective list) ==
- Piano Sonata #2 (2004-5)
- Astralis for guitar and orchestra (1992–99)
- String Quartet #2 (1993)
- In Space and Time for 27 players (1984–87)
- Adjacent Lines and Equal Parts for solo piano (1985)
- Image and Process for chamber orchestra (1982)
- Piano Sonata #1 (1981)
- String Quartet #1 (1979)
- 24 Two-Part Inventions (1977)

== Discography ==
- Adjacent Lines and Equal Parts, Menschenfreund Records. MF001 (1985).
