= José "Quique" Rivera =

Photographer, sculptor

- Born: 1986 (age 39–40); San Juan, Puerto Rico
- Known for: Stop-Motion Animation
- Notable work: Así De Grandes Son Las Ideas, El delirio del pez león
- Website: www.quiquerivera.com

José "Quique" Rivera is a contemporary photographer, sculptor, self-taught stop-motion animator, and filmmaker born in San Juan, Puerto Rico in 1986. He is currently based in Glendale, California and is the CEO and founder of Acho Studio, an animation studio in Los Angeles that focuses on stop-motion animation.

== Biography ==
Rivera has served on multiple juries at film and animation festivals, including the New Orleans Film Festival in 2013, where his film "El Delirio Del Pez León" won the Grand Juror Award the previous year. In 2015, Rivera returned to the University of Puerto Rico, Río Piedras Campus, where he received his Bachelor's degree in 2008, to serve as a visiting professor to instruct a two week animation seminar in the School of Communication. He has also worked as a workshop instructor at Atlantic University College. Rivera has had his films shown at more than seventy international film and animation festivals, and has had several exhibitions, most recent of which being an exhibition at the Museum of Latin American Art. He has collaborated with or been commissioned by brands including Disney, Dasani, PES film, and MTV. Recently, Rivera worked as the stop-motion supervisor on the television series Wandavision, creating the "YoMagic commercial" seen in season 1 episode 6.

== Education ==
Rivera attended the University of Puerto Rico, Río Piedras Campus where he received a Bachelor's degree in Audiovisual Communication with a minor in Sculpture in 2008, graduation Summa Cum Laude. Later, he moved from Puerto Rico to California to have a better chance at an animation career, and continued on to obtain a Master's degree in Experimental Animation from the California Institute of the Arts in 2014. While attending the California Institute of the Arts, Rivera received the LAIKA Annual CalArts Scholarship. Rivera also attended the Global Stone Workshop in Carrara, Italy in 2008 for marble sculpting, and attended Universidad de Málaga in Spain as a student of the International Student Exchange Program in 2007.

== Artworks ==
RIvera implements a mix of sculpture and stop-motion animation to present surreal narratives of real world circumstances and issues.

=== "Así De Grandes Son Las Ideas" ===
(This is How Grand Ideas Are) was Rivera's thesis work for the Master's program in Experimental Animation. It is a stop-motion film created alongside René Pérez Joglar in 2014, made to be a music video for Puerto Rican band Calle 13's song of the same title. The film took 70 days to complete, using figures made from plasticine, resin molds, silicone, wire, thread, and epoxy resin, alongside other recycled and reused objects such as food cans. The completed project consisted of over 7,200 still photographs taken from October 2013 to March 2014, that were then combined to create the stop motion film. The video has been screened at over 40 film festivals and earned awards such as the Best Animation award at both the Los Angeles Independent Film Festival and the Rincón Film Festival, and was nominated for a Latin Grammy for Best Music Video.

=== "El Delirio Del Pez León" ===
(Lionfish Delusion) 2012, is a neo-noir stop-motion film featuring two lionfish, made from silicone, aluminum wire, epoxy, cotton and fabric, and their battle of power and greed. The film won the Grand Jury's Animated Short Award at the New Orleans Film Festival, as well as Best Animation at both the Cinefiesta: International Short Film Festival and Rincón International Film Festival.

=== "Menuda Urbe" ===
(What a City), 2010, is a short stop-motion film created out of photos Rivera took in Puerto Rico alongside recycled objects and materials such as paper and wire, and was finished in California. The film shows a bird trying to escape a bustling city, but continually gets trapped by power lines, pollution, and money. Rivera also had a solo art show titled Menuda Urbe including still works inspired from the film in 2011.

== Exhibitions ==
Solo shows
| Exhibition | Organization | Location | Date |
|---|---|---|---|
| Floating Timeline | Museum of Latin American Art | Long Beach, California, United States | October 27, 2019- January 24, 2021 (extended from April 26, 2020) |
| Fabricando Tiempo: objetos, procesos y animaciones de Quique Rivera Rivera | Museo de Arte de Puerto Rico | San Juan, Puerto Rico | 2015 |
| Menuda Urbe | Galería Guatíbiri | San Juan, Puerto Rico | May 26, 2011 |
| Fábulas de la Selección Artificial | Galería Francisco Oller, Universidad de Puerto Rico, Recinto de Río Piedras | San Juan, Puerto Rico | October 8–30, 2009 |

Group shows
| Exhibition | Organization | Location | Date |
|---|---|---|---|
| Concrete Illusions | Abrazo Interno Gallery, Clemente Soto Velez Cultural & Educational Center, New York | Villa Victoria Center for the Arts, Boston, Massachusetts, United States | 2012-2013 |
| Equipaje compartido | Galería Nacional de Bellas Artes | Santo Domingo, Dominican Republic | 2012 |
| Fotorama | Galería Sietesieteocho | Guaynabo, Puerto Rico | 2012 |
| Carry-On: Puerto Rico Inspected | Villa Victoria Center for the Arts, Boston; Abrazo Interno Gallery, Clemente Soto Vélez Cultural & Educational Center, New York, Institute of Puerto Rican Arts & Culture (IPRAC), | Chicago, Illinois, United States | 2011-2012 |
| Puntociego | Galería Sietesieteocho | Guaynabo, Puerto Rico | 2011 |
| Certámen de Fotografía Contemporánea | Galería de las Artes, Universidad del Sagrado Corazón | San Juan, Puerto Rico | 2011 |
| Instalaciones, Construcciones y Ensamblajes, 5to Aniversario de Área | Área: Lugar de Proyectos | Caguas, Puerto Rico | 2010 |
| Aún: Ciudad en entredicho, Inaguración del proyecto Ciudadela | Plaxo Art | San Juan, Puerto Rico | 2010 |
| Propuestas en papel | Galería Francisco Oller, Universidad de Puerto Rico, Río Piedras Campus | San Juan, Puerto Rico | 2010 |
| Chiquitolina | Centro Curatorial La15 | San Juan, Puerto Rico | 2009 |
| Cruce súbito | Plaxo Art | Guaynabo, Puerto Rico | 2008 |
| Expo Graduandos 08 | Galería Francisco Oller, Universidad de Puerto Rico, Río Piedras Campus | San Juan, Puerto Rico | 2008 |

== Collections ==
Rivera does not currently have work on display in a museum or gallery since he works mainly in stop-motion animation and film, but has had work exhibited at the Museum of Latin American Art, the Museum of Art of Puerto Rico, the Galería Guatíbiri, and the Francisco Oller Gallery of UPR (University of Puerto Rico) Río Piedras.

== Honors and awards ==
Rivera has won multiple awards for both his personal films as well as group projects, and in 2016, Rivera received the United States Artist Fellowship award, a monetary award given to recognize artists and their work. Some of Rivera's most notable awards include the Best Animation Award at the 2015 Los Angeles Independent Film Festival, where he was also nominated for Best Music Video, and the Grand Jury Award at the 2012 New Orleans Film Festival. Other awards include, but are not limited to:

- 2015 Jury's Citation 2nd Prize at the 34th Annual Black Maria Film Festival, New York, United States
- Gold Award in Animation at the 2015 Fort Lauderdale International Film Festival College Film Competition, Florida, United States
- Second place in Animation at the 2015 Sunset Film Festival, Los Angeles, California, United States
- Platinum Award at the 2015 International Movie Awards, Jakarta, Indonesia
- Best Animation at the 2015 Fine Arts Film Festival, Los Angeles, California, United States
- Second Place in Animation at the 2015 Sunset Film Festival, Los Angeles, California, United States
- Best Animation at the 2014 Crystal Palace International Film Festival, London, United Kingdom
- Best Stop Motion Student Animation at the 2014 International Brazil Stop Motion Festival, Recife, Brazil
- Silver Award in both Programming and Best Animation sub-categories of the Internet Series Categories at the 2013 Adweek Watch Awards, New York, United States
- Best National Animation at the 2012 Cinefiesta: International Short Film Festival of Puerto Rico, Caguas, Puerto Rico
- Best National Animation at the 2012 Rincón International Film Festival, Rincón, Puerto Rico
- Best National Animation at the 2011 Cinefiesta: International Short Film Festival of Puerto Rico, Caguas, Puerto Rico

A group project Rivera worked on titled "Paper" commissioned by American Honda Motor Company won both Best Commissioned Animation at the 40th annual Ottawa International Animation Festival as well as a silver award for Product/Service Animation at the 2016 Clio Awards. The animation was also nominated for an Emmy Award under the Outstanding Commercial category.

Rivera has also received multiple nominations and honorable mentions, the most notable of which being the nomination of his film "Así de grandes son las ideas" for a Latin Grammy Award for Best Short Form Music Video.

== Bibliography ==
- California Institute of the Arts School of Film/Video. “CalArts School of Film/Video showcase 2015 : Experimental Animation program.” 2015. OCLC 922725100
- COMTEX News Network, Inc. 2015. “’Quique’ Rivera to Lead Workshops on Stop-Motion Animation.” EFE World News Service. January 8, 2015.
- Miami: ContentEngine LLC. 2021. “Puerto Rican Worked on the Latest Episode of WandaVision.” CE Noticias Financieras. February 14, 2021.
- SHOOT. 2015. “Visual Effects and Animation.” SHOOT 56, no.5 (October): 22.
- SHOOT. 2015 “2015's Best Creative Content Seen Through SHOOT's Lens.” SHOOT 56, no.6 (December):14-17.
- Urtiaga, Gabriela. 2019. Floating Timeline: Quique Rivera. Museum of Latin American Art.
