= Machine Project =

Arts organization and event space in Los Angeles, California, US

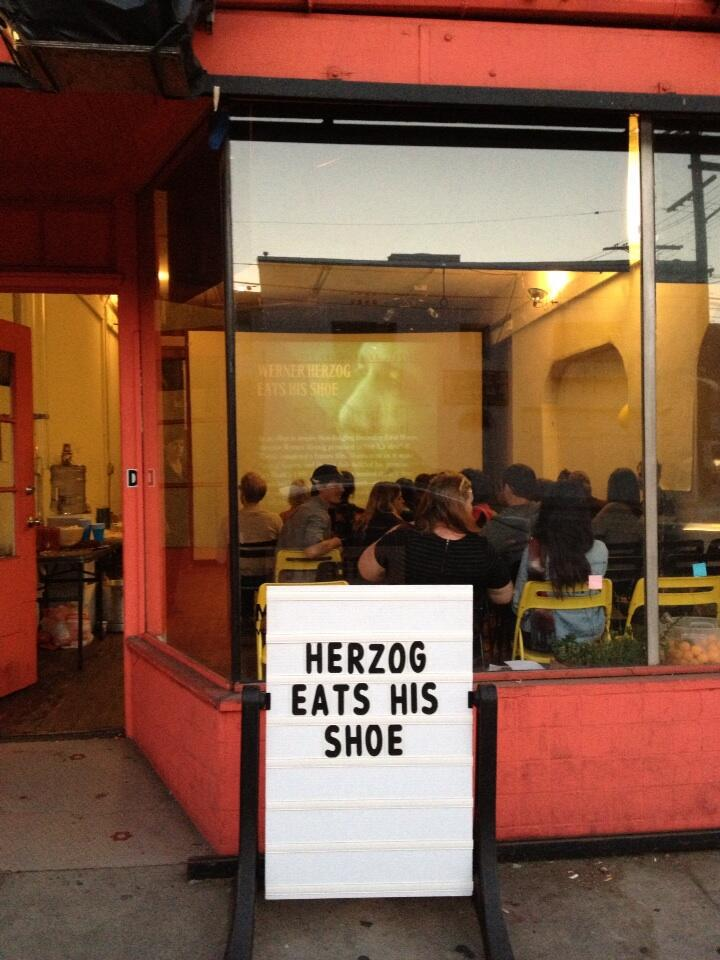
- Film screening at Machine Project on Alvarado Blvd. in Echo Park, Los Angeles.
- Established: 2003-2018
- Location: 1200 D North Alvarado Street Los Angeles, California United States
- Director: Mark Allen
- Website: www.machineproject.com

Machine Project was a Los Angeles based not-for-profit arts organization and community event space.

== History ==
Machine Project launched in 2003 with its inaugural show, 'Tom Jennings - Story Teller,' an installation produced by Tom Jennings, which was displayed from December 6, 2003 until January 24, 2004. Machine Project later collaborated with major art museums, including a one-day takeover of the Los Angeles County Museum of Art (LACMA) on November 15, 2008.

In 2014, Machine Projects installed a series of contemporary artworks around the historic Gamble House in Pasadena. This installation included a secret basement restaurant operated by Bob Dornberger whose menu was inspired by the building's architecture, and a massive sculpture of a vortex on the front lawn by Patrick Ballard that was also a puppet.

Machine Project announced its closure in January 2018.
