= California Institute of the Arts =

American private art school

- Other name: CalArts
- Former name: Los Angeles Conservatory of Music (1883–1961) Chouinard Art Institute (1921–1961)
- Type: Private art school
- Established: 1961; 65 years ago
- Founders: Emily Valentine; Nelbert Chouinard; Walt Disney; Roy O. Disney; Lulu May von Hagen
- Accreditation: WASC
- Endowment: $213.8 million (2022)
- President: Ravi Rajan
- Faculty: 400 (fall 2019)
- Administrative staff: 262 (fall 2019)
- Students: 1,353 (fall 2023)
- Undergraduates: 1,025 (fall 2019)
- Postgraduates: 492 (fall 2019)
- Doctoral students: 6 (fall 2019)
- Location: 24700 McBean Pkwy, Santa Clarita, California, United States; 34.3928°N 118.5673°W
- Campus: 60 acres (24 ha); Suburban
- Website: calarts.edu

The California Institute of the Arts (CalArts) is a private art school in Santa Clarita, California. It was incorporated in 1961 as the first degree-granting institution of higher learning in the US created specifically for students of both the visual and performing arts. It offers Bachelor of Fine Arts, Master of Fine Arts, Master of Arts, and Doctor of Musical Arts degrees. It is located about 30 miles (48 km) northwest of downtown Los Angeles.

The school was first envisioned by many benefactors in the early 1960s including Nelbert Chouinard, Walt Disney, Lulu Von Hagen, and Thornton Ladd.

== History ==
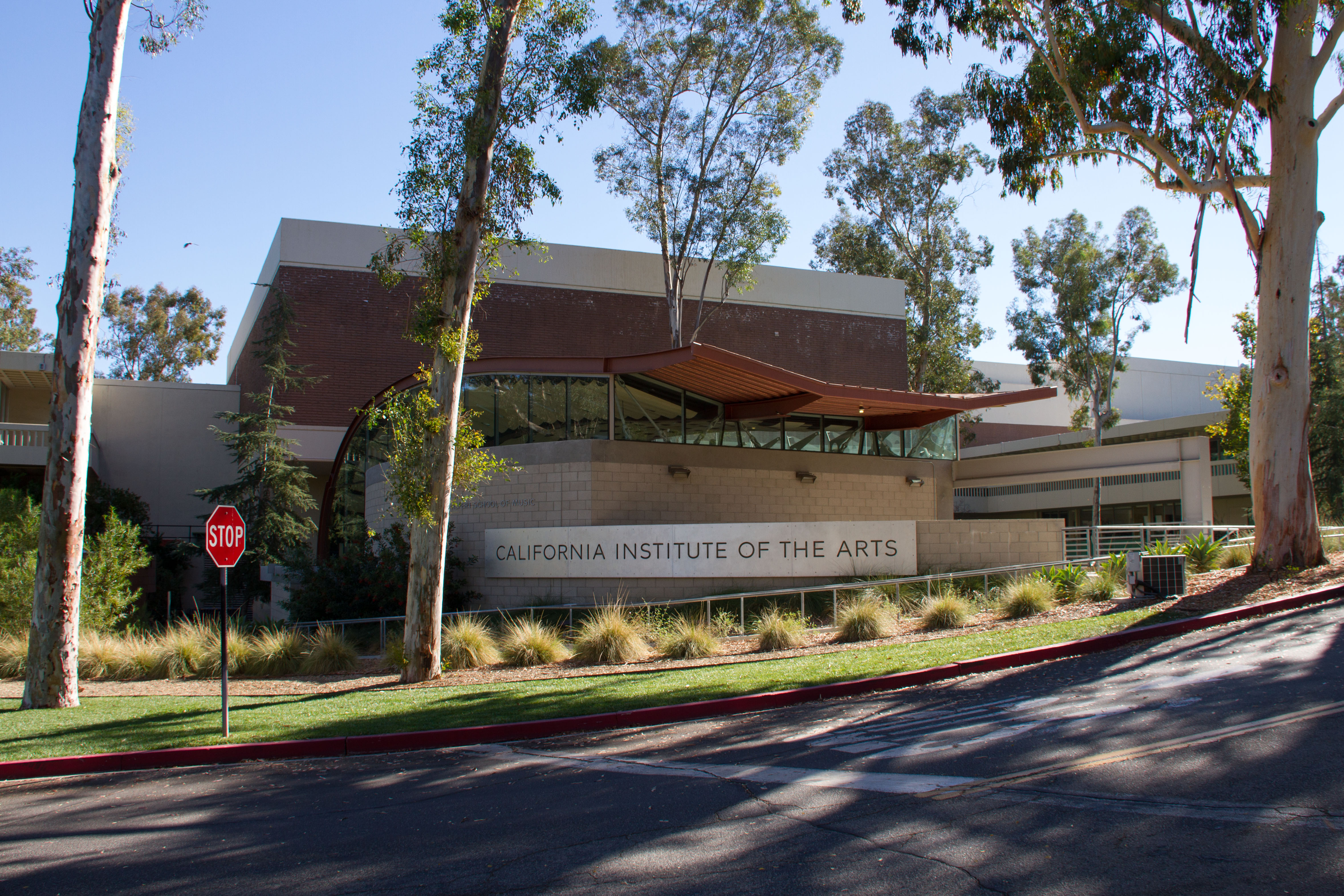
CalArts

CalArts was originally formed in 1961, as a merger of the Chouinard Art Institute (founded 1921) and the Los Angeles Conservatory of Music (founded 1883). Both of the formerly existing institutions were going through financial difficulties, and the founder of the Art Institute, Nelbert Chouinard, was terminally ill. Walt Disney was longtime friends with both Chouinard and Lulu May Von Hagen, the chair of the Conservatory, and discovered and trained many of his studio's artists at the two schools (including Mary Blair, Maurice Noble, and some of the Nine Old Men, among others). To keep the educational mission of the schools alive, the merger and expansion of the two institutions was coordinated, a process which continued after Walt's death in 1966. Joining him in this effort were his brother Roy O. Disney, Nelbert Chouinard, Lulu May Von Hagen and Thornton Ladd (Ladd & Kelsey, Architects).

Without Walt, the remaining founders assembled a team and planned on creating CalArts as a school that was a destination, like Disneyland, to be a feeder school for the various arts industries. To lead this project, they appointed Robert W. Corrigan as the first president of the institute. John Vincent and Mitchell Wilder were early considerations of the president of the new organization.

The original board of trustees at CalArts included Nelbert Chouinard, Lulu May Von Hagen, Harrison Price, Royal Clark, Robert W. Corrigan, Roy E. Disney, Roy O. Disney, film producer Z. Wayne Griffin, H. R. Haldeman, Ralph Hetzel (then vice president of Motion Picture Association of America), Chuck Jones, Ronald Miller, Millard Sheets, attorney Maynard Toll, attorney Luther Reese Marr, bank executive G. Robert Truex Jr., Jerry Wexler, Meredith Willson, Peter McBean and Scott Newhall (descendants of Henry Newhall), Mrs. Roswell Gilpatric, and Mrs. J. L. Hurschler.

In 1965, the Alumni Association was founded as a separate organization. The 12 founding board of directors members were Mary Costa, Edith Head, Gale Storm, Marc Davis, Tony Duquette, Harold Grieve, John Hench, Chuck Jones, Henry Mancini, Marty Paich, Nelson Riddle, and Millard Sheets.

The ground-breaking for CalArts' current campus took place on May 3, 1969, as part of the Master Plan for a new planned community in the Santa Clarita Valley of Los Angeles. However, construction of the new campus was hampered by torrential rains, labor shortages, and the Sylmar Earthquake in 1971. As a result, the first combined campus for the Institute started at the former Villa Cabrini Academy (now the home of Woodbury University) in July 1970. CalArts moved to its new campus in Valencia, now part of the city of Santa Clarita, California, in November 1971.

Founding CalArts president Corrigan, formerly the founding dean of the School of Arts at New York University, fired almost all the artists who taught at Chouinard and the Conservatory in his attempt to remake CalArts into his new vision. Only four Chouinard faculty members went on to teach at CalArts, including Louis Danziger, Emerson Woelffer, Matsumi Kanemitsu, and Paul McGuire. He appointed fellow academic Herbert Blau to be the founding dean of the School of Theatre and Dance, and serve as the institute's first Provost. Blau and Corrigan then hired other academics to found the original academic areas, including Mel Powell (dean of the School of Music), Paul Brach (dean of the School of Art), Alexander Mackendrick (dean of the School of Film), Maurice R. Stein (director of Critical Studies), and Richard Farson (dean of the School of Design), as well as other influential faculty such as Stephan von Huene, Allan Kaprow, Bella Lewitzky, Michael Asher, Jules Engel, John Baldessari, Judy Chicago, Ravi Shankar, Max Kozloff, Miriam Shapiro, Douglas Huebler, Morton Subotnick, Norman M. Klein, and Nam June Paik, most of whom came from a counterculture and avant garde perspective.

Corrigan held his position until 1972, when he was fired and replaced by then board member William S. Lund, Walt Disney's son-in-law, as the Institute approached insolvency. The period between 1972 and 1975 was extremely unstable financially, and Lund had to make significant operational reductions, including layoffs, reducing all faculty contracts to one-year, pausing degree programs, eliminating the School of Design, and folding degree programs into other Schools in order to keep the Institute alive.

In 1975, Robert J. Fitzpatrick was appointed president of CalArts. During his presidency, the Institute grew its enrollment and stabilized, renewed its accreditation, and added new programs for which it is known globally today, including Character Animation and Jazz. While President, Fitzpatrick also served as the director of the 1984 Olympic Arts Festival. He then founded the Los Angeles Festival, which grew directly out of the proceeds of the 1984 Olympic Games. After 1984, it was largely John Orders, assistant to the president/chief of staff, who coordinated the institute's operations in partnership with the other leaders. In 1987, Fitzpatrick resigned as president to take the position as head of EuroDisney (now Disneyland Paris) in Paris, France.

During the search for a President from 1987 to 1988, Nicholas England, the then dean of the School of Music, served as Acting President. In the fall of 1988, Steven D. Lavine, then the Assistant Program Director for the Arts and Humanities of the Rockefeller Foundation, was appointed president. By the time Lavine started his tenure, CalArts had developed a structural deficit of 16%, and during his time in office, Lavine grew enrollment and increased tuition significantly while remaining within the existing square footage of the campus. In 2003, he added the Roy & Edna Disney CalArts Theatre, part of the Los Angeles Music Center's new Walt Disney Concert Hall project, to the operations of the Institute.

Seven years into his tenure, President Lavine navigated the 1994 Northridge Earthquake, which closed the main building in Valencia at the start of the spring semester. Classes were held in rental party tents on the 60 acre grounds, and alternate teaching locations were scattered miles apart around Los Angeles County. The building was "red tagged" and not allowed to be used until millions of dollars of repairs were performed. Under the advisement of James Haire of American Conservatory Theater, Lavine was able to allocate emergency funding from Federal Emergency Management Agency. This funding provided the bulk of the financial assistance for structural repairs due to seismic activity. Additionally, private donations supported aesthetic renovations of curated spaces in the building. CalArts reopened the doors to its Valencia campus in the fall 1994 semester.

On June 24, 2015, Lavine announced he would step down as president in May 2017, after 29 years in the position. After an 18-month search (which included over 500 candidates), Board Chair Tim Disney and the CalArts board of trustees announced on December 13, 2016, that Ravi S. Rajan, then the dean of the School of the Arts at the State University of New York at Purchase, was unanimously selected as president to begin in June 2017.

Over the years, the institute has developed experimental interdisciplinary laboratories through extramural funding such as the CHANEL Center for Artists and Technology, the Center for Integrated Media, and the Cotsen Center for Puppetry.

== Academics ==
CalArts offers various undergraduate and graduate degrees in programs that are related to and combine music, art, dance, film, animation, theater, and writing. Students receive intensive professional training in an area of their creative aspirations without being cast into a rigid pattern. The institute's overall focus is on experimental, multidisciplinary, contemporary arts practices, and its stated mission is to enable the professional artists of tomorrow, artists who will transform the world through artistic practice. With these goals in place, the Institute encourages students to recognize the complexity of political, social, and aesthetic questions and to respond to them with informed, independent judgment.

=== Admission ===
Every program within the Institute requires that applicants send in an artist's statement, along with a portfolio or audition to be considered for admission. The institute has never required an applicant's SAT or other test scores, and does not consider an applicant's GPA as part of the admission process without the consent of the applicant .

	2019	2018	2017
Applicants	4,033	4,431	2,265
Admits	1,238	1,200	545
Admission rate	30.7%	27.1%	24.1%
Enrolled	529	523	235

=== Conception and foundation ===
The initial concept behind CalArts' interdisciplinary approach came from Richard Wagner's idea of Gesamtkunstwerk ("total artwork"), of which Walt Disney himself was fond and explored in a variety of forms, beginning with his own studio, then later in the incorporation of CalArts. He began with the film Fantasia (1940), where animators, dancers, composers, and artists alike collaborated. In 1952, Walt Disney Imagineering was founded, where Disney formed a team of artists including Herbert Ryman, Ken O'Brien, Collin Campbell, Marc Davis, Al Bertino, Wathel Rogers, Mary Blair, T. Hee, Blaine Gibson, Xavier Atencio, Claude Coats, and Yale Gracey. He believed that the same concept that developed WDI could also be applied to a university setting, where art students of different media would be exposed to and explore a wide range of creative directions.

== Campus life ==
=== Notable facilities ===
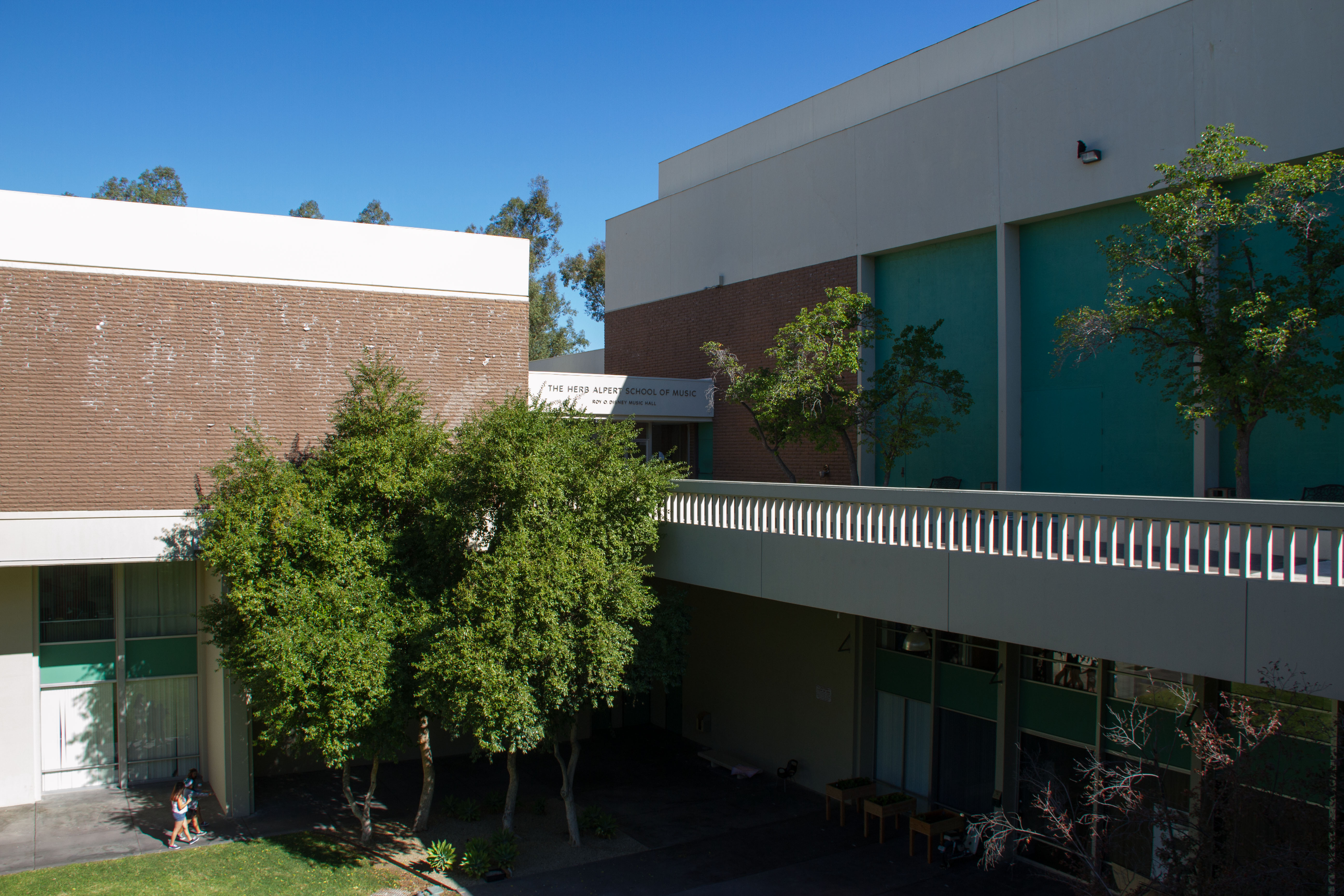

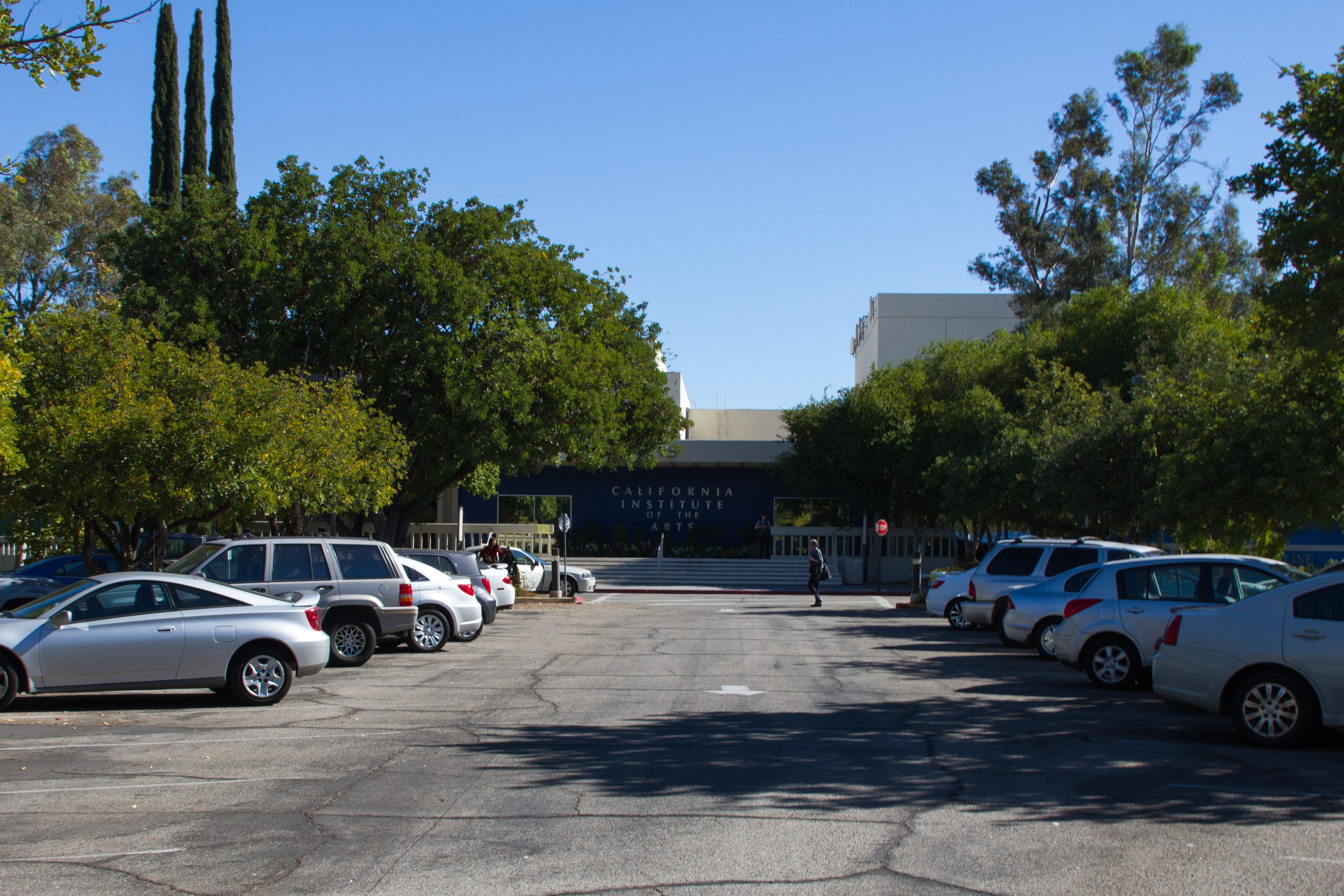
Main academic building

=== A113 ===
A113 is a classroom at CalArts where the character animation program (then called the Disney animation program) was originally founded. Many CalArts alumni have inserted references to it in their works (not just animation) as an homage to this classroom and to CalArts.

=== Downtown Los Angeles ===
In 2003, CalArts built a theater and art gallery in downtown Los Angeles called REDCAT, the Roy and Edna Disney CalArts Theater as part of the Walt Disney Concert Hall in the Los Angeles Music Center.

=== John Baldessari Art Studios ===
In 2013, CalArts opened its John Baldessari Art Studios, which cost $3.1 million to build, and features approximately 7,000 square feet of space for MFA Art students and program courses. In addition to debt, funding for the studios was partially raised by the sale of artwork donated by School of Art alumni, for whom each studio was then named.

== Notable people ==
CalArts' notable current and former faculty members include the artists John Baldessari, Judy Chicago, Charles Gaines, Martin Kersels, Thomas Lawson, Miriam Schapiro, and Allan Kaprow. The faculty in theatre arts has included Fran Bennett, Lee Breuer, Ron Cephas Jones, Lew Palter, Suzan-Lori Parks, and Janie Geiser. The faculty in dance has included Donald Byrd, Donald McKayle, Mia Slavenska, Rebecca Wright, George de la Peña and Bella Lewitzky. The faculty in music has included John Bergamo.

Notable alumni include artists Nayland Blake, Raven Chacon, Eric Fischl, Guillermo Gómez-Peña, Mike Kelley, Matt Mullican, and Catherine Opie and animator Siranudh Scott.

Notable alumni working in film and television include Alison Brie, Tim Burton, Don Cheadle, Sofia Coppola, Ed Harris, David Hasselhoff, Stephen Hillenburg, Paul Reubens, Katey Sagal. and Oliver Tree.

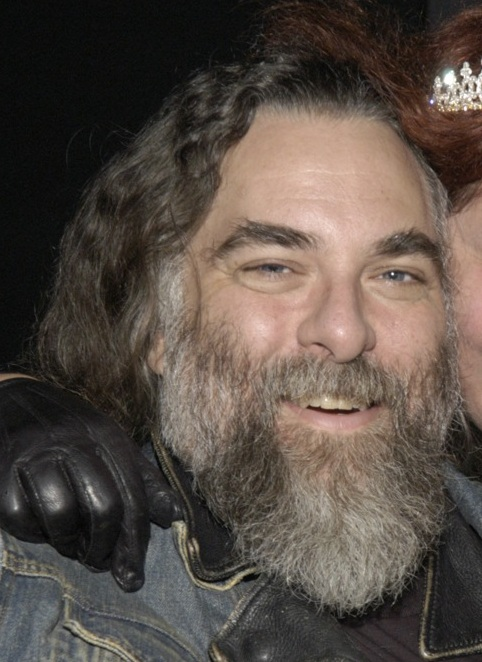
Mixed-media artist Nayland Blake (MFA 1984)

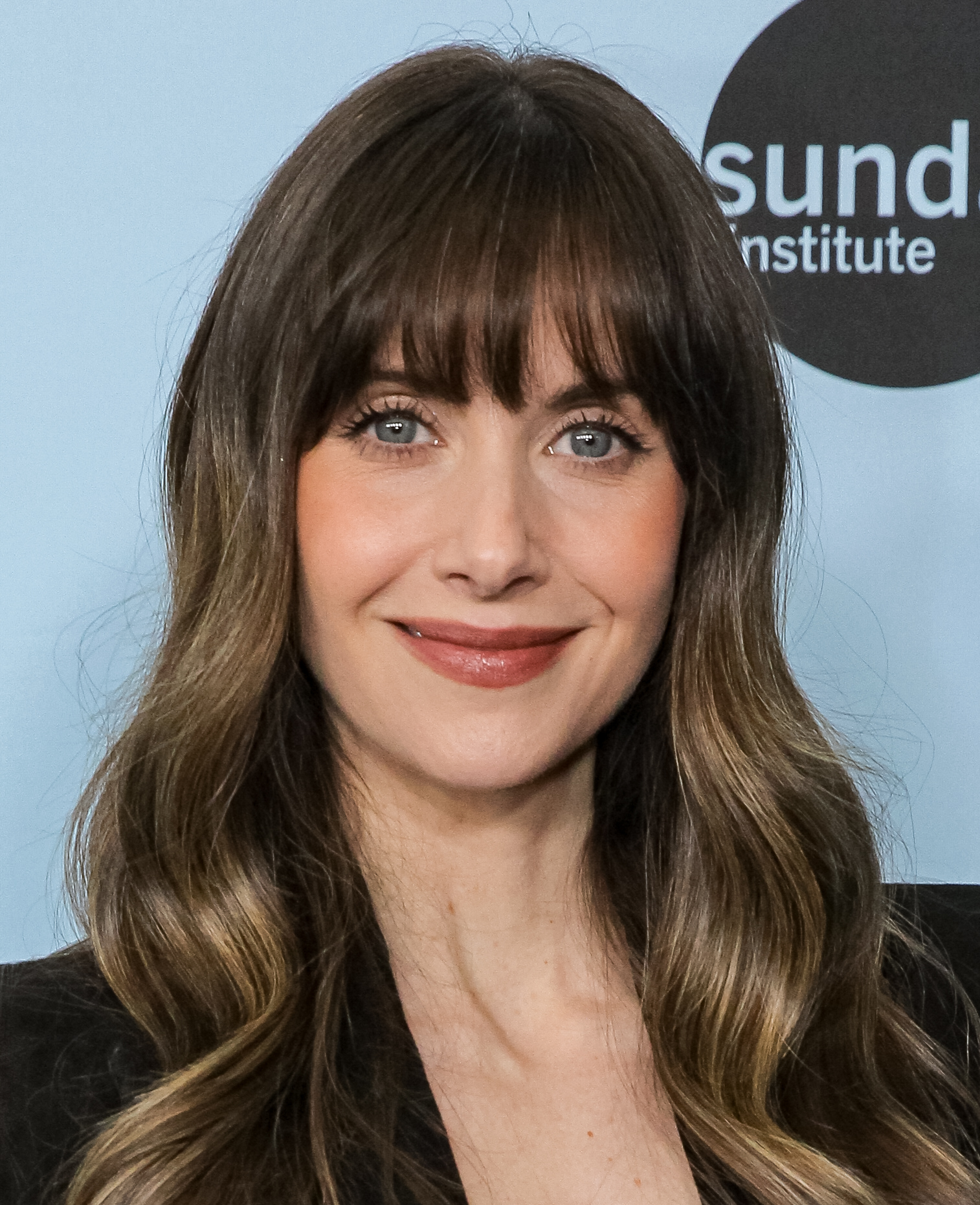
Actress Alison Brie (BFA 2005)

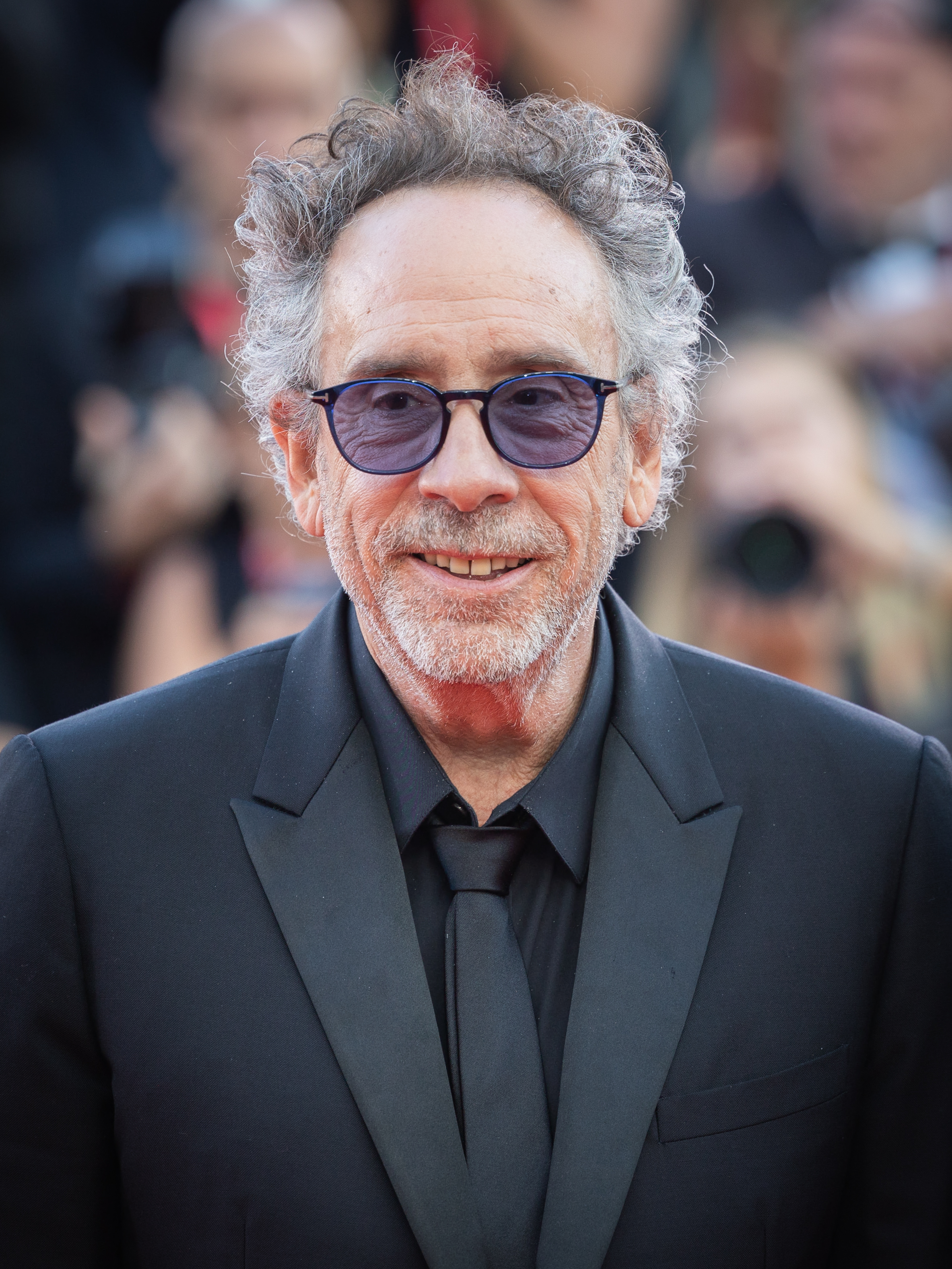
Film director and animator Tim Burton (1979)

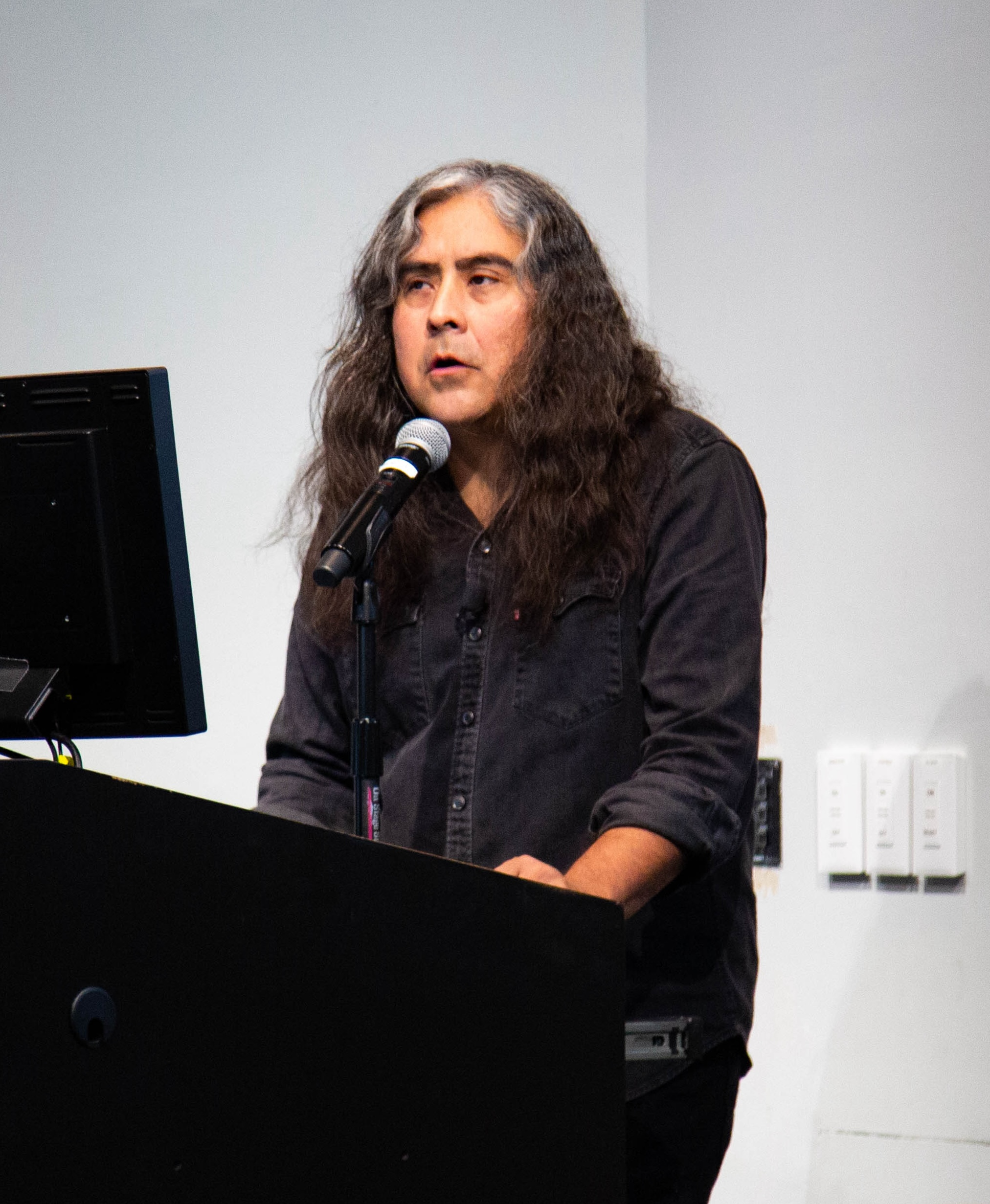
Composer, musician and artist Raven Chacon (MFA 2004)

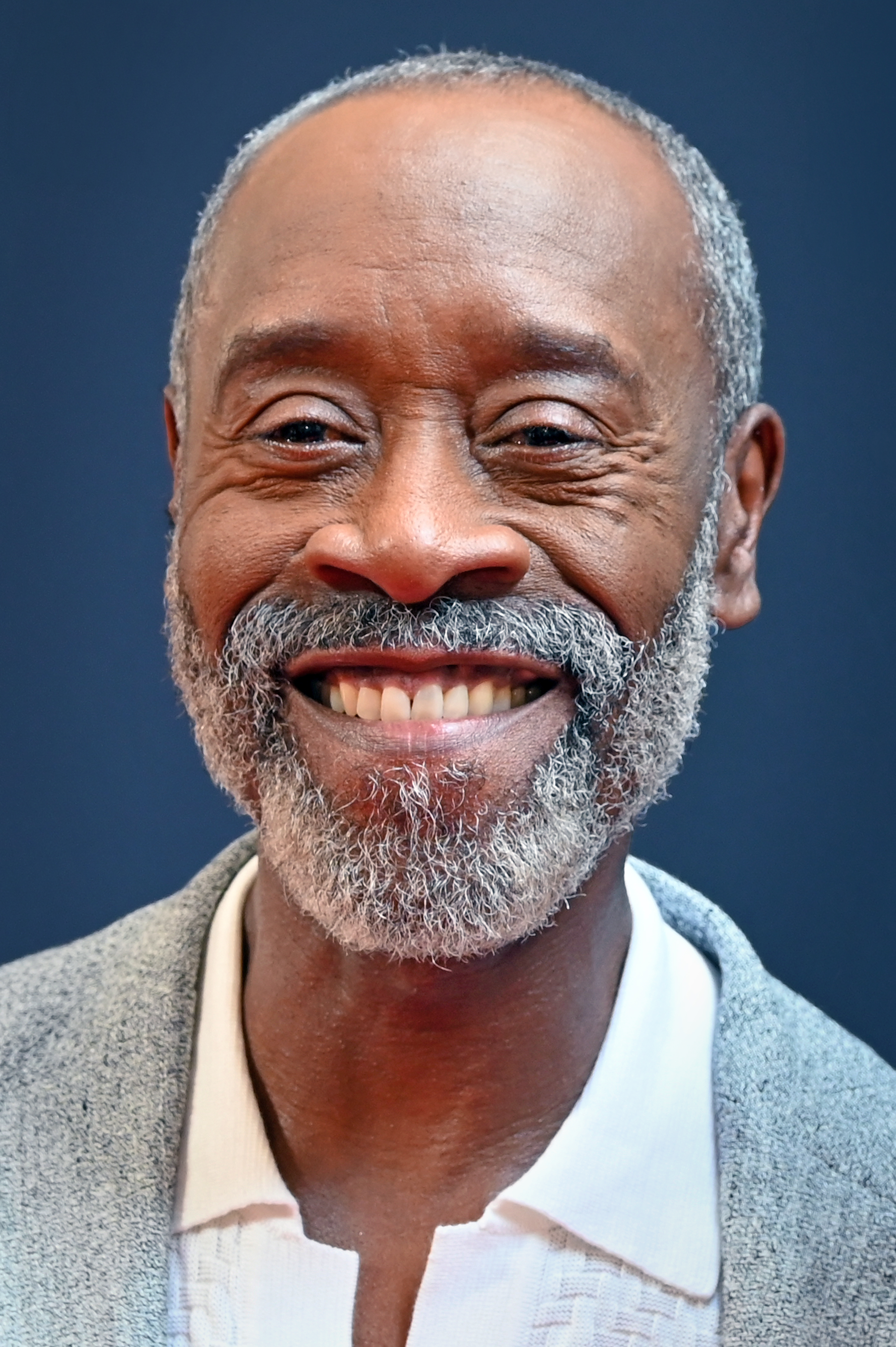
Actor Don Cheadle (BFA 1986)

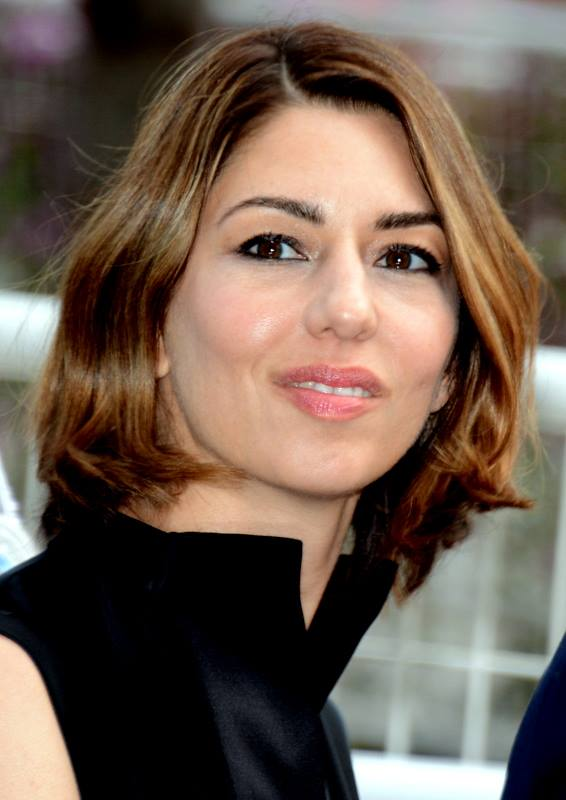
Filmmaker Sofia Coppola (1994)

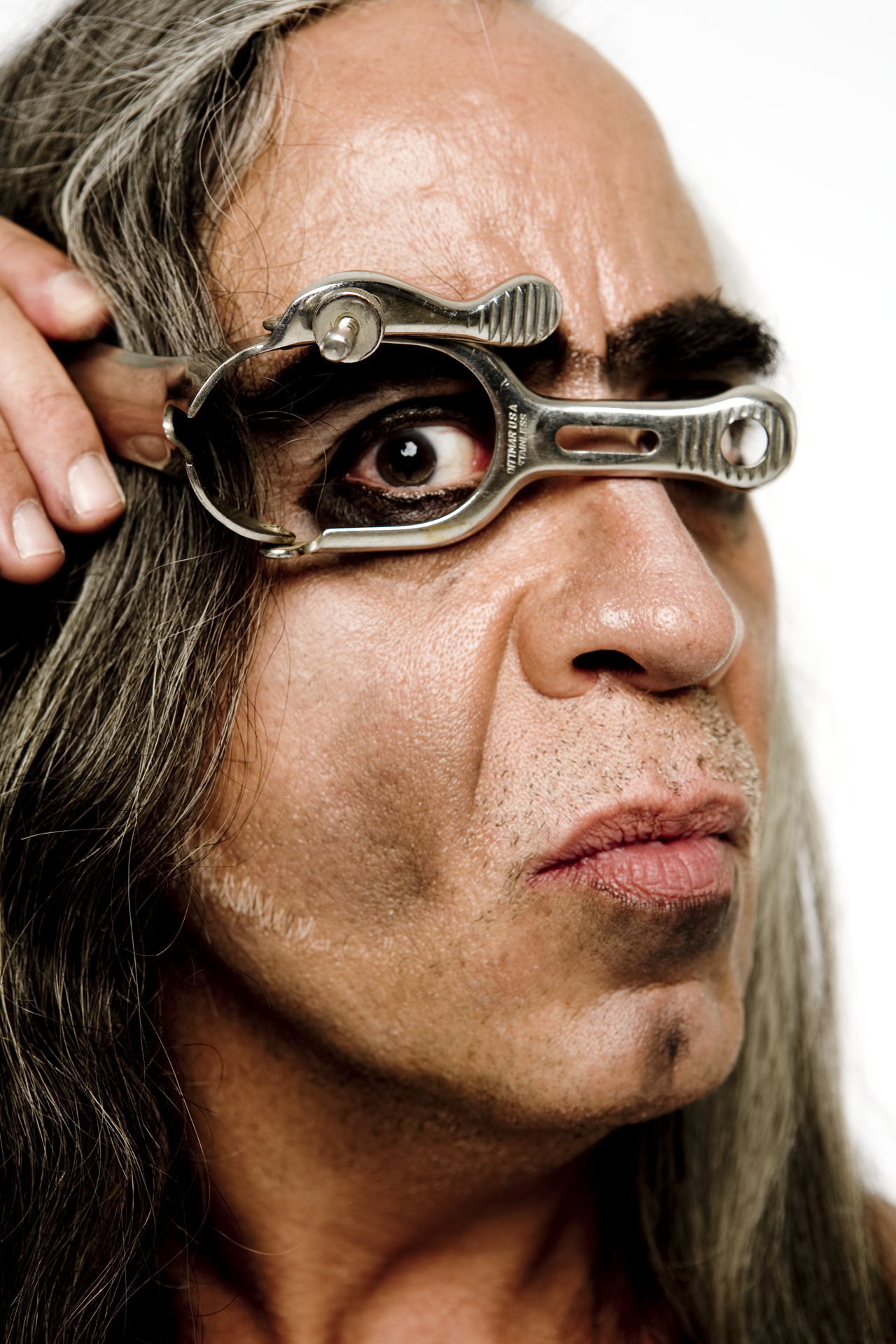
Performance artist Guillermo Gómez-Peña (BFA 1981, MFA 1983)

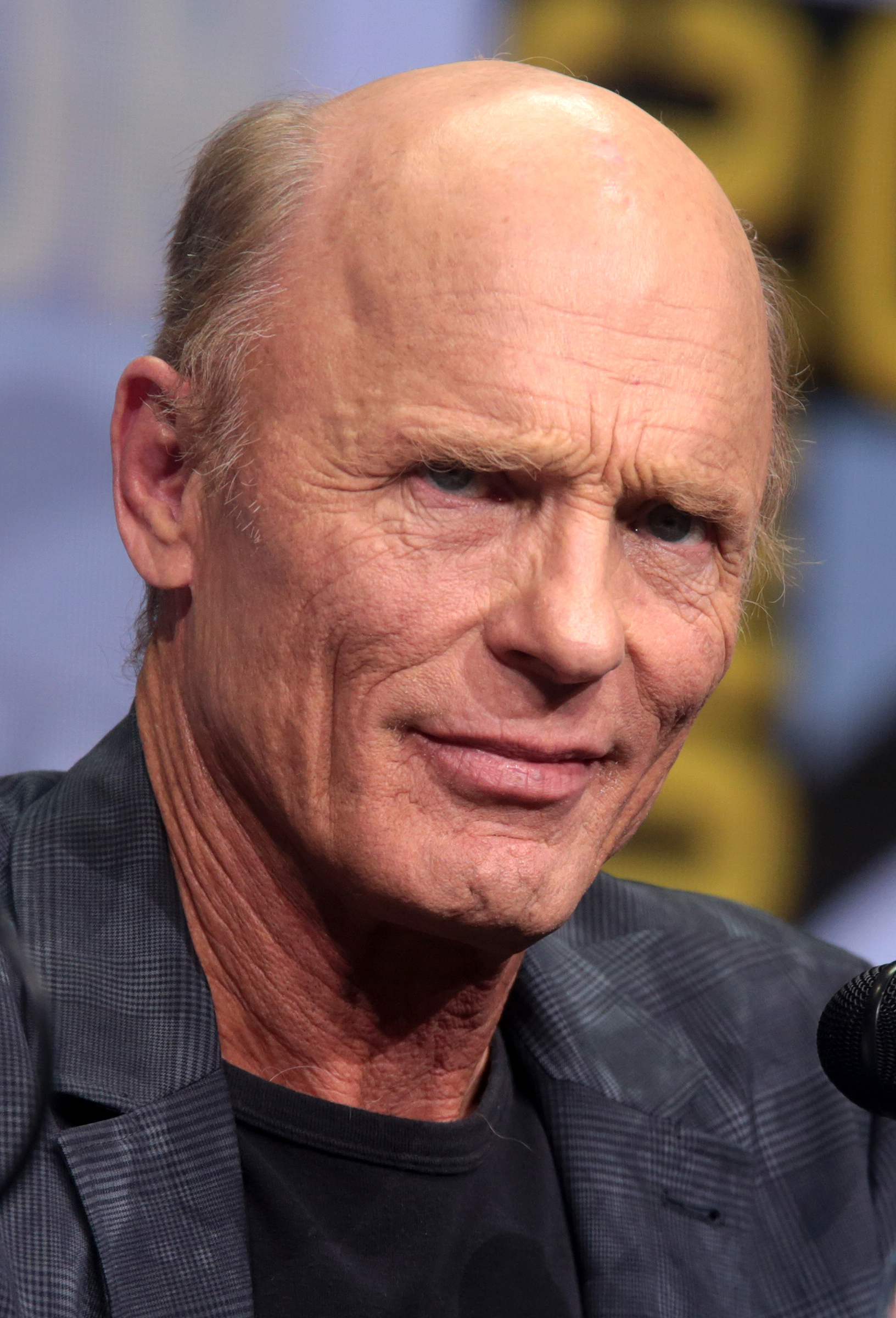
Actor Ed Harris (BFA 1975)

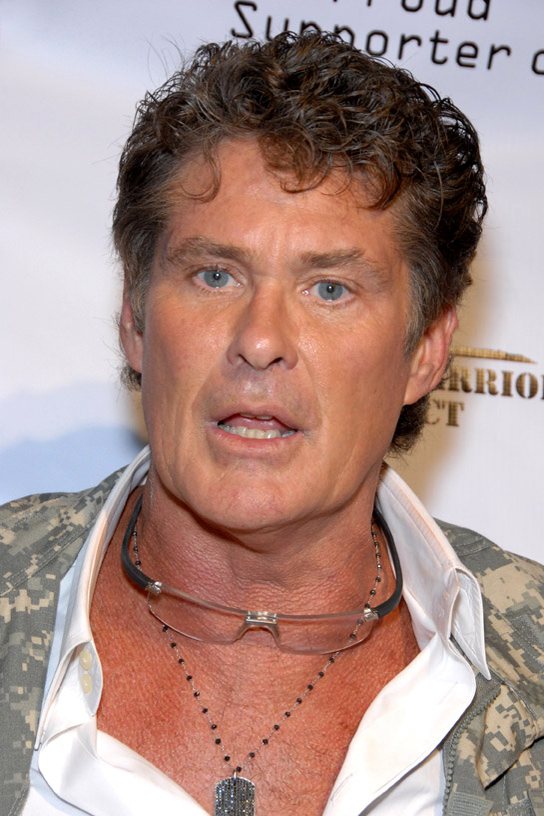
Actor David Hasselhoff (1973)

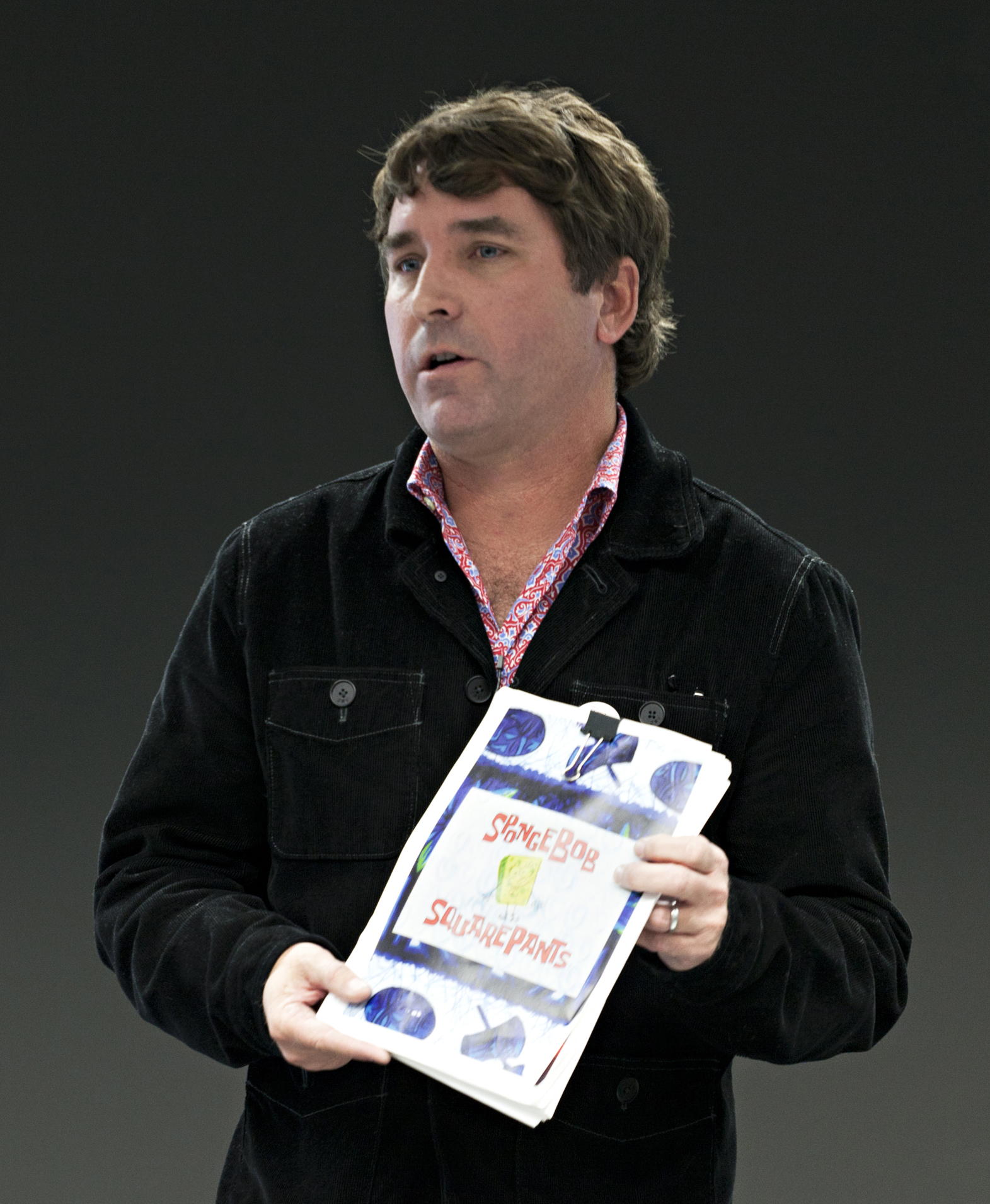
Animator Stephen Hillenburg (MFA 1992)

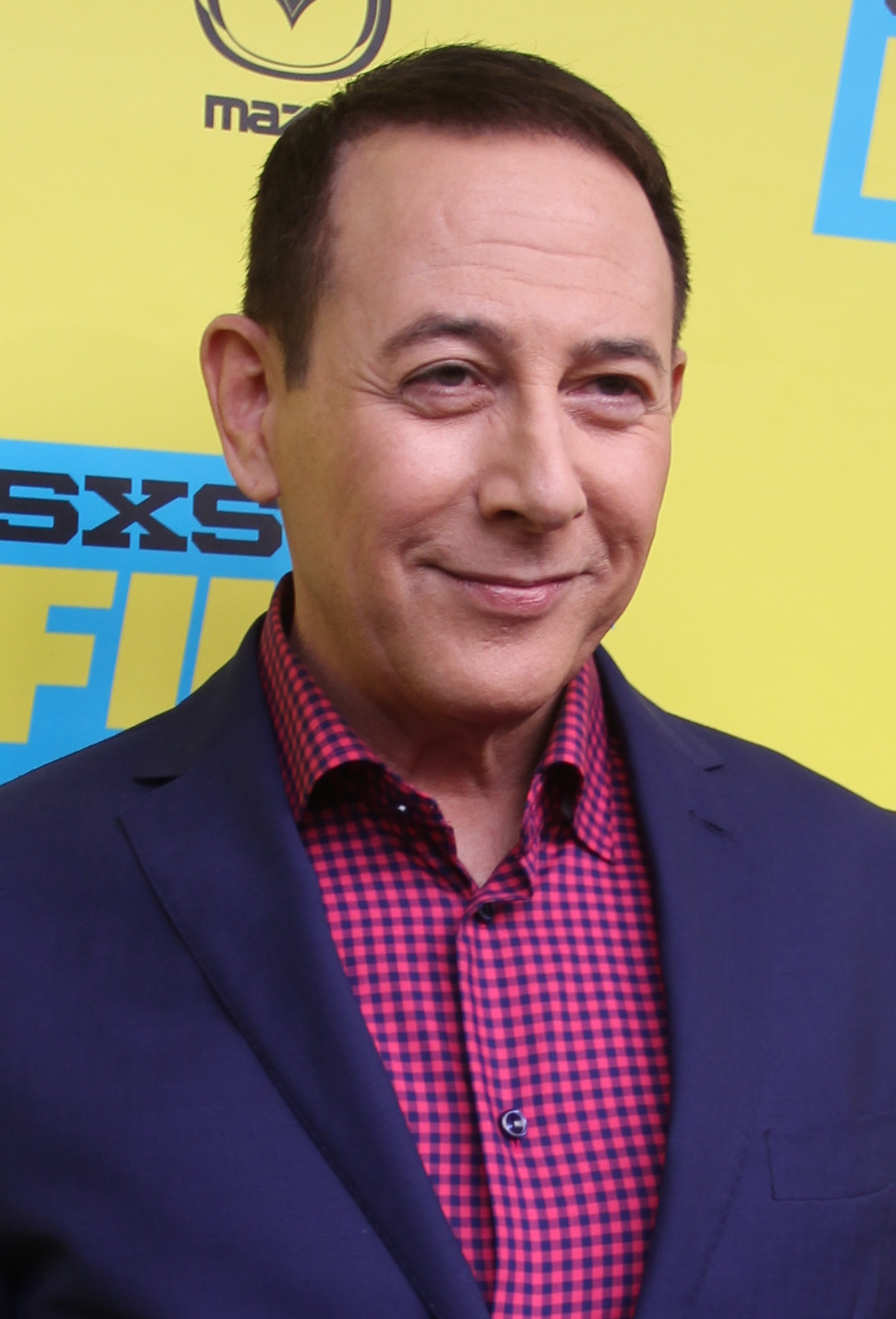
Actor and comedian Paul Reubens (BFA 1973)

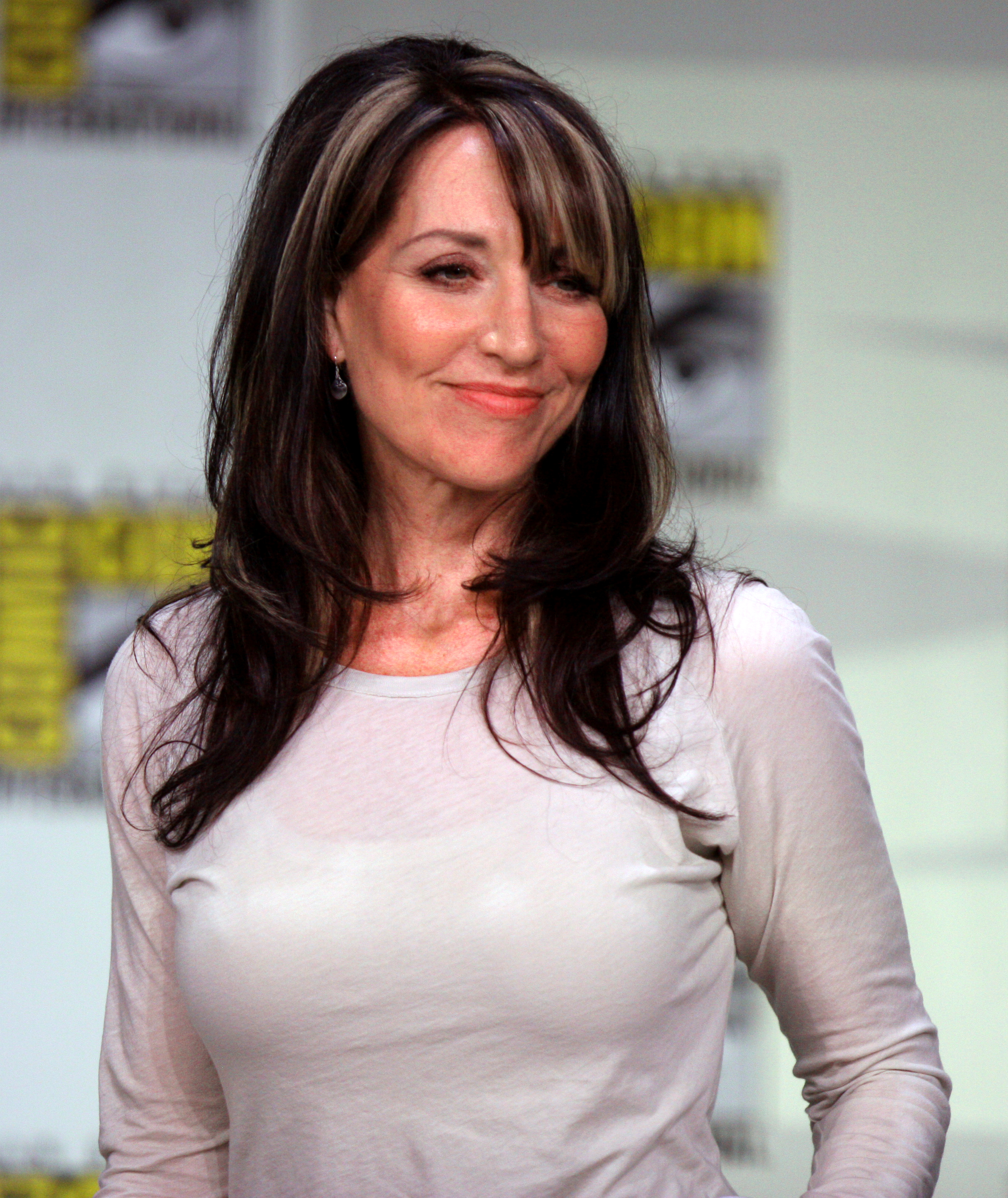
Actress Katey Sagal (1972)

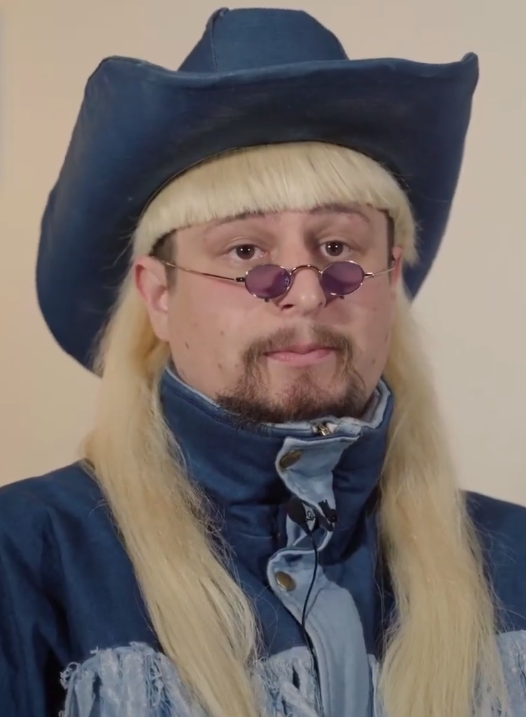
Composer, musician and artist Oliver Tree (BFA 17)

== Alpert Award in the Arts ==
The Alpert Award in the Arts was established in 1994 by The Herb Alpert Foundation and CalArts. The institute annually awards a $75,000 no-strings-attached fellowship to five artists in the fields of dance, film and video, music, theatre, and visual arts. Awardees have a residency at CalArts during the following academic year.

== Student outcomes ==
According to College Scorecard, the median income in 2020 and 2021 for graduates who matriculated in 2010 and 2011 was $43,071, with 48% of graduates making more than high school graduates.

British magazine Times Higher Education states the salary 10 years after graduation is $35,500. According to Payscale, graduates make $71,000 in early career and $113,200 in mid-career.

Center on Education and the Workforce estimates the return on investment 10 years after graduation with a bachelor's from CalArts is -$80,000; however, this metric appreciates to $630,000 40 years after graduation.

=== Graduation rates ===
According to College Scorecard, the graduation rate at Calarts is 65%.

== Reception and legacy ==
As of 2026, U.S. News & World Report's most recent rankings place CalArts as the seventh best overall graduate program for fine arts in the United States.

In 2020, U.S. News & World Report ranked CalArts as the fifth best graduate program for fine arts in the United States, tied with the Rhode Island School of Design and behind the UCLA School of the Arts and Architecture, School of the Art Institute of Chicago, Yale School of Art, and Virginia Commonwealth University School of the Arts. By specialty, CalArts was ranked third in Time-Based Media/New Media and ninth in Painting/Drawing, Photography, and Sculpture.

In 2011, Newsweek/The Daily Beast listed CalArts as the top school for arts-minded students; the ranking was intended to assess campuses that offer an exceptional artistic atmosphere.

CalArts' various schools are consistently featured in the top ten lists of the "best schools" of Art, Film, Animation, Theater, Music, and Dance of publications such as U.S. News, New York Times, The Hollywood Reporter, Variety, and various other news and trade publications.

During the early years of CalArts, the faculty and administration have or have had an affiliation with Yale University. This includes Robert Corrigan, Herbert Blau, Paul Brach, Mel Powell, Peter de Bretteville, Sheila Levrant de Bretteville, Yoko Matsuda, David Schwartz, William Douglas, Keith Godard, Craig Hodgetts, Alan Schoen, and Allan Vogel. More recently this connection includes Anoka Faruqee, Martin Kersels, Jack Vees, Libby Van Cleve, John Hogan, Samuel Messer, Taryn Wolf, and current president Ravi Rajan.

=== Animation industry ===
In February 2014, Vanity Fair magazine highlighted the success of CalArts' 1970s animation alumni and briefly profiled several (including Jerry Rees, John Lasseter, Tim Burton, John Musker, Brad Bird, Gary Trousdale, Kirk Wise, Henry Selick and Nancy Beiman) in an article illustrated with a group portrait taken by photographer Annie Leibovitz inside classroom A113.

In the late 1980s, a group of CalArts animation students contacted animation director Ralph Bakshi. As he was in the process of moving to New York, they persuaded him to stay in Los Angeles to continue to produce adult animation. Bakshi then got the production rights to the cartoon character Mighty Mouse. By Bakshi's request, Tom Minton and John Kricfalusi went to the CalArts campus to recruit the best talent from what was the recent group of graduates. They hired Jeff Pidgeon, Rich Moore, Carole Holliday, Andrew Stanton and Nate Kanfer to work on the then-new Mighty Mouse: The New Adventures television series.

In a 2002 interview, Craig "Spike" Decker of Spike and Mike's Festival of Animation criticized commercial aspects of the school, saying "A lot of animators come out of CalArts – they could be so prolific, but then they're owned by Disney or someone, and they're painting the fins on The Little Mermaid. You'll never see their full potential."

=== Film industry ===
A number of students of Alexander Mackendrick would go on to be Hollywood film executives. It is speculated because the course curriculum of Makendrick emphasized story and script analysis, that graduates are skilled as assessing successful film projects in the pre-production phase. This list of alumni would include David Kirkpatrick, Thom Mount, Sean Daniel, and Bruce Berman.

Graduates from the music school have gone on to be noted film and television composers. This includes: John Debney, Gary Chang, Drew Neumann, Marcelo Zarvos, Benjamin Wynn, and Jeremy Zuckerman. Dane Davis is a noted sound editor.

=== Art Film ===
The experimental documentary has become an important branch of non-mainstream film, especially at institutions like CalArts, where the School of Film/Video supports personal essays, political documentaries, lyrical and abstract films, and other experimental forms.

CalArts graduates such as Deborah Stratman, Travis Wilkerson, Bill Brown, Naomi Uman and Chie Yamayoshi represent a loose but influential community defined by aesthetic experimentation, observational nonfiction, and strong visual style.Their work often uses minimal budgets, long takes, found footage, and essayistic structure to explore subjects such as isolation, politics, and the texture of everyday life, while also helping expand the visibility of avant-garde filmmaking beyond major art centers. They are influenced by CalArts faculty such as James Benning and Thom Andersen.

=== Art ===
During the formative years of the art school, many of the teaching artists led different camps of art traditions. The two main traditions were the conceptualism students, which were led by John Baldessari, and the fluxus camp, which was led by Allan Kaprow. Kaprow's approach to art was a continuation from his tenure at Rutgers University. Other movements included Light and Space, which was closely related to the artists associated with the Ferus Gallery in the greater Los Angeles area.

In March 1972, CalArts hosted an on-campus exhibition called The Last Plastics Show, which was organized by faculty artists Judy Chicago, Doug Edge, and Dewain Valentine. This exhibition included notable artists such as, Carole Caroompas, Ron Cooper, Ronald Davis, Fred Eversley, Craig Kauffman, Linda Levi, Ed Moses, Barbara T. Smith, and Vasa Mihich.

In the autobiography Bad Boy: My Life On and Off the Canvas by CalArts alum Eric Fischl, he describes his experience as a student as follows: "CalArts had such a narrow idea of the New. It was innovation for its own sake, a future that didn't include the past. But without foundation, without techniques or a deeper understanding of history, you'd go off these wild explorations and end up reinventing the wheel. And then you'd get slammed for it."

Art critic Dave Hickey critiqued the art program of CalArts by suggesting that the variety of reference that students are exposed to is limited to a certain pantheon. He stated "I can go over to CalArts and ask them if they know who John Wesly is, and they would go, 'Huh? What discourse does he participate in?' I am in the art world only insofar as there are interesting things for me to write about. When that stops, or when I stop getting offers to write things, I'll be out." Additionally, Hickey mentioned the use of appropriation by students at programs like CalArts. In this, he referenced the VH1 show Pop-Up Video, by which he stated "Creators Tad Low and Woody Thompson should receive honorary MFAs for [Pop Up Video], because grad students worldwide are getting diplomas for just this sort of thing -- stealing (or as they say in art school, "appropriating") hackneyed pop images and scribbling on top of them à la granddaddy Marcel."

In the LA Weekly op-ed piece "The Kids Aren't All Right: Is over-education killing young artists?", published in 2005, curator Aaron Rose wrote about an observed trend he recognized in Los Angeles's most esteemed art schools and their MFA programs, including CalArts. He uses the example of Supersonic, "a large exhibition ... that features the work of MFA students from esteemed area programs like CalArts, Art Center, UCLA, etc." In his observation of the showcase, he says "... the work left me mostly empty and with a few exceptions seemed like nothing more than a rehash of conceptual ideas that were mined years ago." He went on to state that "these institutions are staffed with amazing talents (Mike Kelley and John Baldessari among them). Legions of creative young people flock to our city [Los Angeles] every year to work alongside their heroes and develop their talents with hopes of making it as an artist." He goes on to further state "What happens too often in these situations, though, is that we find young artists simply emulating their instructors, rather than finding and honing their own aesthetics and points of view about the world, society, themselves. In the beginnings of an artist's career, the power in his or her work should lie not in their technique or knowledge of art history or theory or business acumen, but in what one has to say."

Musician and CalArts alumnus Ariel Pink notes in an interview "Unlike other art schools, they didn't focus on skills of any kind, specific color theory or anything like that. They were the only art school that was totally focused on teaching artists about the art market. They were trying to make the next Damien Hirst. They're trying to make the next Jeff Koons. Those guys don't need to know how to paint or draw."

=== Music ===
In 1978, CalArts initiated the first annual music series called the Contemporary Music Festival on its campus. Music by composers such as John Cage, Paul Dresher, Morton Feldman, Milton Babbitt, and Lou Harrison, among others, was played at the first edition of the festival.

CalArts graduates have joined or started successful pop bands, including Maryama, Tranquility Bass, The Belle Brigade, The Weirdos, The Swords of Fatima / Buko Pan Guerra, Bedroom Walls, Dawn of Midi, Dirtwire, The Rippingtons, Fitz and the Tantrums, Fol Chen, London After Midnight, No Doubt, Mission of Burma, Radio Vago, Oingo Boingo, Acetone, Liars, Suburban Lawns, The Mae Shi, The Suburbs, Touché Amoré, and Ozomatli.

Danny Elfman and Grant-Lee Phillips never officially enrolled at CalArts, but participated in the school's world music courses. Elfman would later gain recognition for his composition work with CalArts alum Tim Burton, and Phillips would go onto a career in music.

Thurston Moore and Kim Gordon, members of the band Sonic Youth, made remarks in an interview with VH1 about the band Liars, of which the members Angus Andrew and Julian Gross are CalArts alumni. Moore's initial remarks were: "There's this whole world of young people who [think] everything's allowed. What Liars are doing right now is completely crazy. I saw them the other night and it was really great. It's really out-there". Gordon then stated "I'm not so crazy about the way [the Liars' They Were Wrong, So We Drowned] sounds. It's like 'how lo-fi can we make it?' But I think the content is really good". In reference to CalArts and Gordon's statement, Moore commented: "They're art kids. They came out of CalArts and that's the kind of sensibility you have when you come out of these sort of places." In a 2005 interview, Moore discussed the book Jack Goldstein and the CalArts Mafia and his conversation with Gordon after reading the book. During their conversation, Moore asked Gordon why she had chosen to attend Otis College of Art and Design instead of CalArts, a school she had always wanted to attend since she grew up in Los Angeles. Gordon explained that she was unable to afford CalArts' high tuition. Moore went on to emphasize that the book did not mention the economic feasibility of attending CalArts and that this financial barrier can create a division between those who can afford highly regarded academic art education and those who pursue DIY art.

=== Jazz Studies ===
The jazz program at CalArts originated from bassist Charlie Haden and pianist David Roitstein’s belief that jazz should be taught as a living, creative practice rather than simply a repertoire to master. Developed during 1982–83 and formally launched in 1983, the program emphasized small ensembles, improvisation, original composition, and helping students discover their own musical identities. Haden and Roitstein established an approach in which jazz traditions and standards served as a starting point rather than a destination. The goal was not to abandon fundamentals but to use them as tools for creating new music and developing an individual artistic voice. A defining extension of that philosophy arrived in 1990, when Roitstein established the annual CalArts jazz recording project with support from Capitol Records and EMI Music. By recording students’ original compositions at Capitol Studios in Hollywood, the project linked composition, performance, and professional recording experience while creating an ongoing record of the program’s musical development.

Over the decades, faculty members including James Newton, Wadada Leo Smith, Albert Heath, Joe LaBarbera, Darek Oleszkiewicz, Larry Koonse, Alphonso Johnson, and Bennie Maupin broadened the program’s artistic reach across jazz traditions and experimental music. Its alumni—including Scott Colley, Ralph Alessi, Ravi Coltrane, Willie Jones III, Steph Richards, and James Brandon Lewis—demonstrate a legacy extending well beyond its founding generation. Haden remained associated with CalArts for more than three decades, until his death in July 2014, and the school continues to honor his influence through the Charlie Haden/CalArts Artist in Residence series.

=== Theater ===
CalArts’ Theater School evolved through a succession of leaders who each reshaped its balance of experimentation, craft, repertory training, and professional engagement. Herbert Blau, while founding provost rather than Theater dean, established the school's foundational postmodern and experimental spirit, privileging interdisciplinary inquiry, ensemble creation, and resistance to conventional conservatory structures. Lou Poulter is remembered for bringing a stronger Irish-theater influence into the early school's culture. Robert Benedetti, dean from 1973 to 1981, consolidated serious actor and director training while preserving CalArts’ experimental mandate, joining practical craft to adventurous performance-making. Libby Appel then introduced a more repertory-oriented, Shakespearean conservatory tradition, emphasizing textual rigor and classical performance discipline. Ruben Sierra, who came from Seattle Group Theatre, expanded the school's multicultural, community-facing, and entrepreneurial ambitions, envisioning closer connections between CalArts students, working artists, and Los Angeles theater. Susan Solt strengthened producing and new-work development, including through the Center for New Theater, helping students connect their artistic work to professional realities. Finally, Travis Preston extended the school's experimental legacy through the Center for New Performance, emphasizing devised, interdisciplinary, international, and technologically adventurous work.

CalArts theater faculty have had connections with the “Tulane Mafia”, which is a tongue‑in‑cheek label for a network of drama scholars and practitioners around Tulane University in the late 1950s–1970s whose work helped reshape contemporary theater scholarship and training. This included the school's first president Robert Corrigan, in addition to Monroe “Doc” Lippman, Richard Schechner, Earle R. Gister, and Ted Hoffman. They were known for experimental, intellectually aggressive approaches to drama and for placing Tulane at the center of emerging performance studies and new theater movements

In his book, Survival of the Richest, media theorist and MFA directing program graduate Douglas Rushkoff described his time while a theater student at CalArts. He saw CalArts as an institution that offered numerous opportunities for interdisciplinary collaboration; however, despite the creative atmosphere, the theater school was rooted in tradition, adhering to the classical approach to drama with a focus on crisis, climax, and resolution.

Rushkoff, influenced by the experimental theater of the 1970s and 1980s (i.e. Happenings, Fluxus), had a different perspective on theater. Rushkoff believed in blurring the line between performer and audience, and questioned the traditional theater model, which he viewed as imposing a sense of inevitability and confirming established order. He saw this as cultural propaganda, creating problems in the first act and solving them in the last.

In addition to his dissatisfaction with the traditional theater model, Rushkoff was troubled by the high cost of theater productions. After attending a performance of Bertolt Brecht's The Threepenny Opera at the Ahmanson Theatre in 1989 and noticing the high cost of the least expensive ticket, he decided to leave the theater behind in favor of the Internet. He believed that interactivity and digital platforms, such as the Web and hypertext stories, would provide users with multiple pathways and the freedom to choose their own adventures. Even in video games with clear-cut goals (i.e. Super Mario, World of Warcraft), players could derive satisfaction from exploring the game world rather than focusing solely on achieving the official story objectives.

== "CalArts style" animation ==
A pejorative term, "CalArts style", gained prominence in the late 2010s to describe an animation style allegedly overused on popular American television channels such as Cartoon Network and Disney Channel. The term had reportedly been in use within the animation industry since the early 1990s; its spread outside of the industry is attributed to animator and Ren & Stimpy creator John Kricfalusi. In a now-deleted blog post from 2010 about CalArts alumnus Brad Bird's 1999 animated film The Iron Giant, Kricfalusi criticized what he saw as young animators subconsciously copying superficial aspects of well-respected animators' work (specifically, late 1950s to 1970s Disney movies) without learning underlying animation skills. As the decade progressed, the term came to refer to a cartoon aesthetic different from the one Kricfalusi described. Works that have been said to exemplify this version of the "CalArts style" not only include Adventure Time, Gravity Falls, Regular Show, Star vs. the Forces of Evil, We Bare Bears, Amphibia, Clarence, Inside Job and Over the Garden Wall, which were all from CalArts graduates Pendleton Ward, Alex Hirsch, J.G. Quintel, Daron Nefcy, Daniel Chong, Matt Braly, Skyler Page, Shion Takeuchi, and Pat McHale respectively, but also the works of many non-CalArts animators, such as Rebecca Sugar's Steven Universe, Ben Bocquelet's The Amazing World of Gumball, Dana Terrace's The Owl House, Owen Dennis' Infinity Train, Natasha Allegri's Bee and PuppyCat, Justin Roiland and Dan Harmon's Rick and Morty, The Houghton Brothers' Big City Greens, Ian Jones-Quartey's OK K.O.! Let's Be Heroes, Noah Z. Jones' Fish Hooks, Enrico Casarosa's Oscar-nominated Luca, and Domee Shi's Academy Award-nominated Turning Red.

Detractors claim that because of CalArts' importance to American animation, it often inspires other styles of illustration. American animator Rob Renzetti questioned the use of the term, saying that it has been applied so broadly as to be functionally meaningless as criticism, and is instead just name calling. Adam Muto, executive producer on Adventure Time, has also said the term over-simplifies the process of animation design, and is too vague. Gavia Baker-Whitelaw on The Daily Dot wrote that many animation fans that deride the "CalArts style" do so only when it is associated with shows that appear to promote, in their views, "Tumblr culture" that favors progressive views.

== See also ==
- Afterall
- Black Clock
- East of Borneo
- Pixar
- The 1 Second Film
- The Pictures Generation
- Womanhouse
- Student Academy Awards
