= Janet Sternburg =

American writer and photographer

Janet Sternburg (born January 18, 1943, in Boston, Massachusetts) is an American writer of essays, poetry and memoir, as well as a fine art photographer. Sternburg is the editor of The Writer On Her Work, the first book of commissioned essays on what it means to be a contemporary woman who writes. It has been continuously in print since 1980, and a twentieth anniversary edition was published by W.W. Norton in 2000. Sternburg lives in Los Angeles and San Miguel de Allende, Mexico. Her most recent book is White Matter: A Memoir of Family and Medicine. She is married to Steven Lavine.

== Early life and education ==
Sternburg was raised in Roxbury, Massachusetts. She studied at the New School for Social Research, graduating in 1967 with a B.A. degree in philosophy.

== Career ==
Sternburg first worked at NET, the national educational television service where, in 1969, she produced a feature-length documentary, El Teatro Campesino, on the Chicano theatre troupe that had performed in the agricultural fields of central California in support of the farm workers strike led by Cesar Chavez. The film was broadcast on public television.

In the early 1970s Sternburg turned her attention to the confluence of women and creativity, a shift in direction that influenced the rest of her professional life. She conceived, commissioned and edited a compendium of contemporary and diverse female voices, The Writer On Her Work (1980). A sequel to The Writer On Her Work, subtitled New Essays In New Territories, was published in 1991. For this second volume Sternburg commissioned essays from women around the world. Poets & Writers magazine devoted a cover story to both books, calling them "landmarks". The second book was selected for 500 Great Books by Women.

Interest in Virginia Woolf's novels and essays led Sternburg to produce, co-direct and write the short film, Virginia Woolf: The Moment Whole, featuring Marian Seldes as Woolf. In an interview Sternburg said, "Woolf's work has a powerful sense of experience in the world. I felt that the person who had written her novels could not have been the ethereal creature that many people have imagined." The Woolf film was broadcast on public television.

Through the 1970s and 80s, Sternburg continued to publish essays and poems. She served as director of Writers in Performance at the Manhattan Theatre Club from 1971 to 1980. In an article about the series, journalist David Kaufman wrote, "Sternburg's background as a writer, a filmmaker, and director of films for public television, lent a unique blend of administrative and programming expertise with literary and creative insights–a mixture that would shape the series' future and mold it into the important force it has become."

In 1980 she became Senior Program Officer at the New York Council for the Humanities, co-editing a book, Historians and Filmmakers: Toward Collaboration, intended to break barriers between artists and scholars. From 1988 to 1994 Sternburg served as Senior Program Advisor to The Rockefeller Foundation, fostering intercultural film and video projects and co-curating the exhibition "Re-Mapping Cultures" at the Whitney Museum with John G. Hanhardt.

In 1988, Sternburg married Steven D. Lavine who had recently been appointed president of California Institute of the Arts. In January 1994, the Northridge earthquake severely damaged the CalArts campus. For Sternburg, the experience served as a profound object lesson in the fragility of all things, leading her to write the book Phantom Limb: A Meditation on Memory. The book has been described as "part moving account of greater love in the face of her mother's death, part medical inquiry into neurology, and part spiritual meditation on the struggles and sufferings that living visits on each of us." Her most recent book, White Matter: A Memoir of Family and Medicine (September, 2015) is the second in a projected trilogy. A story of family secrets and mental illness, White Matter spans one hundred years and the lives of five sisters and one brother, interwoven with science and history.

White Matter was chosen for a Publishers Weekly "Big Indie Book of the Fall". Forbes Magazine suggested that in writing White Matter "Sternburg uses all the skills at her disposal, the sensitivity, precision and lyricism of a poet, the hard edges of a photographer, the intelligence and scholarship of an academic, to plumb the many facets of this story and its legacy on her and her family."

== Photography ==
In 1998, Sternburg began making photographs with disposable cameras, using their technical limitations to see "the layers of time and space that are present in a single moment." Her photographs have been exhibited in solo shows in New York, Los Angeles, Korea, Mexico, Berlin, Freiburg, Heidelberg and Munich, and are in the collection of The Fisher Museum at the University of Southern California. Portfolios of her photographs have been published in Aperture magazine and Art Journal. In his essay, "The Lyrical View", German cultural critic Joern Jacob Rohwer writes: "[Sternburg's] vision captivates audiences with intellectual and emotional depth, precision of observation, and an unmistakable sense of the moment." Her continuing exploration of the relationships between word and image led to the publication of Optic Nerve: Photopoems. In this book, she combined poems with photographs "which do not act as an adjunct to the poem, but in a subtle way complement and finish each piece." In 2017, a monograph of her photographic work, Overspilling World: The Photographs of Janet Sternburg was published by DIstanz Verlag with a Foreword by Wim Wenders who writes: "Photographers don't have eyes in the back of their head. Janet Sternburg does. This book makes you understand the act of seeing and the reflection that might lead to a photograph in a whole new way." Her newest book is I've Been Walking: Janet Sternburg Los Angeles Photographs, published also by Distanz Verlag (Berlin). The images were taken during the COVID lockdown, when Sternburg walked through her city at a time when it appeared to be frozen but where she found traces of ongoing life.

== Awards and affiliations ==
Sternburg was a board member of PEN Center USA from 1988 to 2002. Since 1974, she has been awarded residencies at The MacDowell Colony, The Millay Colony, Blue Mountain Artist Residency, and the Djerassi Resident Artists Program. She has received grants from the American Embassy in Germany and the National Endowment for the Humanities. In 2003, she was selected as one of 40 artists recognized by Utne Reader in an article titled "Movers and Shakers: The Most Exciting Soulful Artists of 2003." In 2016 she was co-recipient of the REDCAT AWARD, given to individuals who exemplify the creativity and talent that define and lead the evolution of contemporary culture

== Bibliography ==
- Overspilling World. Janet Sternburg, with texts by Wim Wenders, Catherine Opie et al. (Distanz Verlag, 2016). ISBN 978-3-95476-133-3
- Phantom Limb: A Meditation on Memory (Foreverland Press, 2013). ASIN: B00C4EW0GM
- The Fifth String, play (2012).
- Optic Nerve: Photopoems (Los Angeles: Red Hen Press, 2005). ISBN 1597090190
- Phantom Limb, ed. Tobias Wolff (University of Nebraska Press, American Lives Series, 2002). ISBN 0803242964
- The Writer on Her Work, Volume 2: New Essays in New Territory (New York: W. W. Norton, 1991). ISBN 0393308677
- Historians and Filmmakers: Toward Collaboration, co-editor with Barbara Abrash. (New York: The Institute for Research in History, 1983). ISBN 0913865036
- The Writer on Her Work (New York: W.W. Norton, 1980). ISBN 0393320553
