= Mitchell Wilder =

American art museum director

Mitchell A. Wilder
- Born: August 20, 1913; Colorado Springs, Colorado
- Died: April 1, 1979 (aged 65)
- Burial place: Fort Worth, Texas
- Education: McGill University, Montreal, Quebec, Canada
- Occupations: Director of art museums and art schools, museum program consultant
- Years active: 1935-1979
- Employer(s): Colorado Springs Fine Arts Center, Abby Aldrich Rockefeller Folk Art Museum, Chouinard Art Institute, Amon Carter Museum of American Art
- Honours

Mitchell (Mitch) Armitage Wilder (August 17, 1913 - April 1, 1979) was an American mid-20th century arts administrator, scholar, and photographer. Between 1935 and 1961 he was the founding curator or director of three art museums: the Taylor Museum of the Colorado Springs Fine Arts Center, the Abby Aldrich Rockefeller Folk Art Museum at Colonial Williamsburg, and the Amon Carter Museum of American Art in Fort Worth, Texas. Additionally, as director of the Chouinard Art Institute, Wilder facilitated the incorporation of that school for animators into the California Institute of the Arts.

At each institution, Wilder worked for patrons who had the money needed for ambitious projects: in Colorado Springs, Alice Bemis Taylor; at Colonial Williamsburg, John D. Rockefeller Jr.; in Los Angeles, Walt Disney; and in Fort Worth, Ruth Carter Stevenson. Along the way, Wilder built lifelong relationships with artists, scholars, and other arts administrators that led to many acquisitions, exhibitions, and publications.

== Early years ==
Wilder was born in 1913 to Charles T. Wilder and Maude Mitchell Wilder. Charles Wilder, who died when Mitch was only six, had been vice president and editor of the Colorado Springs Gazette. Wilder attended Colorado Springs public schools and Northside School in Williamstown, Massachusetts to prepare for college. As a teenager, he began to correspond with Frederick H. Douglas, curator of the Indian Art Department of the Denver Art Museum about a museum career and, in the summers, worked as a field assistant for the Laboratory of Anthropology in Santa Fe, since incorporated into the Museum of Indian Arts and Culture. He became the protégé of the Colorado Springs philanthropist Alice Bemis Taylor, a collector of Native-American and Spanish-American arts, who paid for Wilder to enroll in the Fine Arts Program at McGill University in Montreal. When he graduated in 1935, Taylor made him curator of the Taylor Museum, still under construction.

== Professional life ==
=== Colorado Springs Fine Arts Center ===
Wilder began his work as curator of the Taylor Museum in a temporary office. The museum itself was to be a major component of the newly founded Colorado Springs Fine Arts Center, designed by the Santa Fe architect John Gaw Meem, and funded by Taylor. When the new building opened, in 1936, the first exhibition highlighted Taylor's collection of Pueblo and Navajo crafts. Working closely with Taylor, Wilder expanded the scope of the collections, began publishing related scholarly works, and organizing programs including lectures and film series. The museum's first publications were George Kubler's The Rebuilding of San Miguel at Santa Fe in 1710 and The Religious Architecture of New Mexico In the Colonial Period and Since the American Occupation. In his preface to latter book, Kubler wrote "Many of the photographs were made for this book by Mr. Wilder, without whose friendly collaboration the text would be much less complete."

The Museum of Modern Art recognized the national significance of the collection Wilder curated by including five Taylor native American works in its landmark 1941 exhibition Indian Art of the United States. The exhibition was organized by Frederic H. Douglas, with whom Wilder had corresponded about a museum career as a teenager, and Rene D'Harnoncourt, director of the Museum of Modern Art. In addition to D'Harnoncourt, two of MOMA's trustees named in the catalog would later figure in Wilder's career: Abby Aldrich Rockefeller and Walt Disney.

Just two years later, 1943, MOMA exhibited Religious Folk Art of the Southwest, which featured "... the outstanding collection of Spanish-American art in the Taylor Museum of the Colorado Springs Fine Arts Center, whose curator, Mitchell A. Wilder prepared the exhibition." The catalog of the exhibition also noted that the "... exhibition notes were prepared largely from material supplied the Museum by Mr. Wilder."

On becoming Director of the Fine Arts Center in 1945, while continuing as curator of the Taylor Museum, Wilder demonstrated his vision and his contacts with other museum directors by organizing the exhibition New Accessions USA, which showed recent acquisitions by 29 art museums. In Wilder's words, the exhibition was "the first attempt by any institution of the country to demonstrate comprehensively the direction of collecting among American museums in the field of contemporary American painting." Among the museums lending to the exhibition were the Boston Museum of Fine Arts, the Art Institute of Chicago, the Cleveland Museum of Art, the Dallas Museum of Art, the Detroit Institute of Arts, the Los Angeles County Museum, the Metropolitan Museum of Art, the Museum of Modern Art, the San Francisco Museum of Art, the Virginia Museum of Fine Arts, and the Whitney Museum of American Art.

=== Abby Aldrich Rockefeller American Folk Art Collection Museum ===
In 1953, Colonial Williamsburg announced the appointment of Wilder as a vice president and Director of the Division of Presentation. The next year, the President of Colonial Williamsburg announced John D. Rockefeller Jr. had provided approximately one million dollars for the construction outside the restored colonial area of a new building designed especially to house and exhibit his late wife's collection of American Folk Art. When it opened to the public in 1957, the museum was the first American museum dedicated entirely to American folk art. Wilder's particular responsibility was to oversee the construction of the building and the installation of the collection, which included works that had previously been on loan to the Museum of Modern Art and the Metropolitan Museum of Art. He edited the catalog of the collection, working closely with Nina Fletcher Little, Edith Gregor Halpert, and other scholars, collectors, and dealers of American art. As part of a notice announcing "new and unusual building", Art in America included excerpts from Wilder's published remarks at the museum's opening, including his wish to tell "the role Abby Aldrich Rockefeller played in the transfer of American folk art from the attic and antique shop to the art museums."

=== Chouinard Art Institute ===
In 1958 Walt Disney installed Wilder as director of the Chouinard Art Institute in Los Angeles. Founded by Nelbert Chouinard in 1923, this was one of the top five art schools in the U.S. Disney had been sending his animators to Chouinard for fine arts training since 1929. To develop the talent needed to produce ever more sophisticated films, Disney envisioned "a multi-disciplined school . . . where the graphic arts, music, drama, and film could all be gathered under one roof." Wilder spent twenty years administering just such a school, The Colorado Springs Fine Arts Center. During his three years at Chouinard, Wilder was able to announce key changes that transformed the 35-year-old art school, which had only been accredited by the National Association of Schools of Art and Design in 1955, into a full-fledged academic institution, accredited by the Western Association of Schools and Colleges. This accreditation led to various changes: the appointment of an academic dean, implementation of a novel curriculum, an animated filmmaking course, a class in Japanese art, and implementation of merit based scholarships.

Wilder involved himself in the broader southern California arts scene, judging scholastic art competitions; appearing as a guest on a local telecourse about art, music, and dance; and talking to high school students about a career in the arts.

In 1960, Wilder worked closely with Richard Fargo Brown, curator of the Los Angeles County Museum, to bring an exhibition of 700 objects from the Abby Aldrich Rockefeller American Folk Art Collection Museum to California. This was the first traveling exhibit from the Williamsburg museum where Wilder had been the founding director.

=== Amon Carter Museum of American Art ===
Fort Worth's Amon Carter Museum of American Art opened in January 1961, without a director, but with a board of trustees, led by its president, Ruth Carter Stevenson, the daughter of Amon Carter, who had died in 1955. The trustees included Richard Fargo Brown, director of the Los Angeles County Museum; architect Philip Johnson—who had designed the building; Rene D’Harnoncourt, director of the Museum of Modern Art; C. R. Smith, CEO of American Airlines; and the Houston collector John de Menil.

Six months after the museum's opening, the board announced it had selected Mitchell Wilder to be its director. Even before arriving in Fort Worth, Wilder outlined his program for the museum:

The program of the Amon Carter Museum of Western Art shall be directed to the study, documentation, and presentation of the historic and contemporary culture of the American West. The program shall be expressed in publications, exhibitions, and special projects contributing to the educational resources of the city, state, and nation. Within the broad understanding of the subject, the subject shall not be restricted regionally nor chronologically.

Wilder's accomplishments during the 18 years he directed the Carter Museum were summarized by the Dallas Morning News Art Editor, Janet Kutner, in the obituary she published on April 3, 1979, two days after Wilder's death. Kutner highlighted:

- Enlarging the museum's purpose to encompass the wider field of western hemisphere art,
- Organizing landmark exhibits of national importance, including The Far North, a 1973 survey of Northwest Coast Indian art that premiered at Washington, D.C.'s National Gallery, and The Face of Liberty, a Bicentennial exhibition that included works by Benjamin West, John Singleton Copley, and Thomas Jefferson,
- Setting standards for art research and scholarship,
- Publishing more than 35 catalogs of major exhibitions,

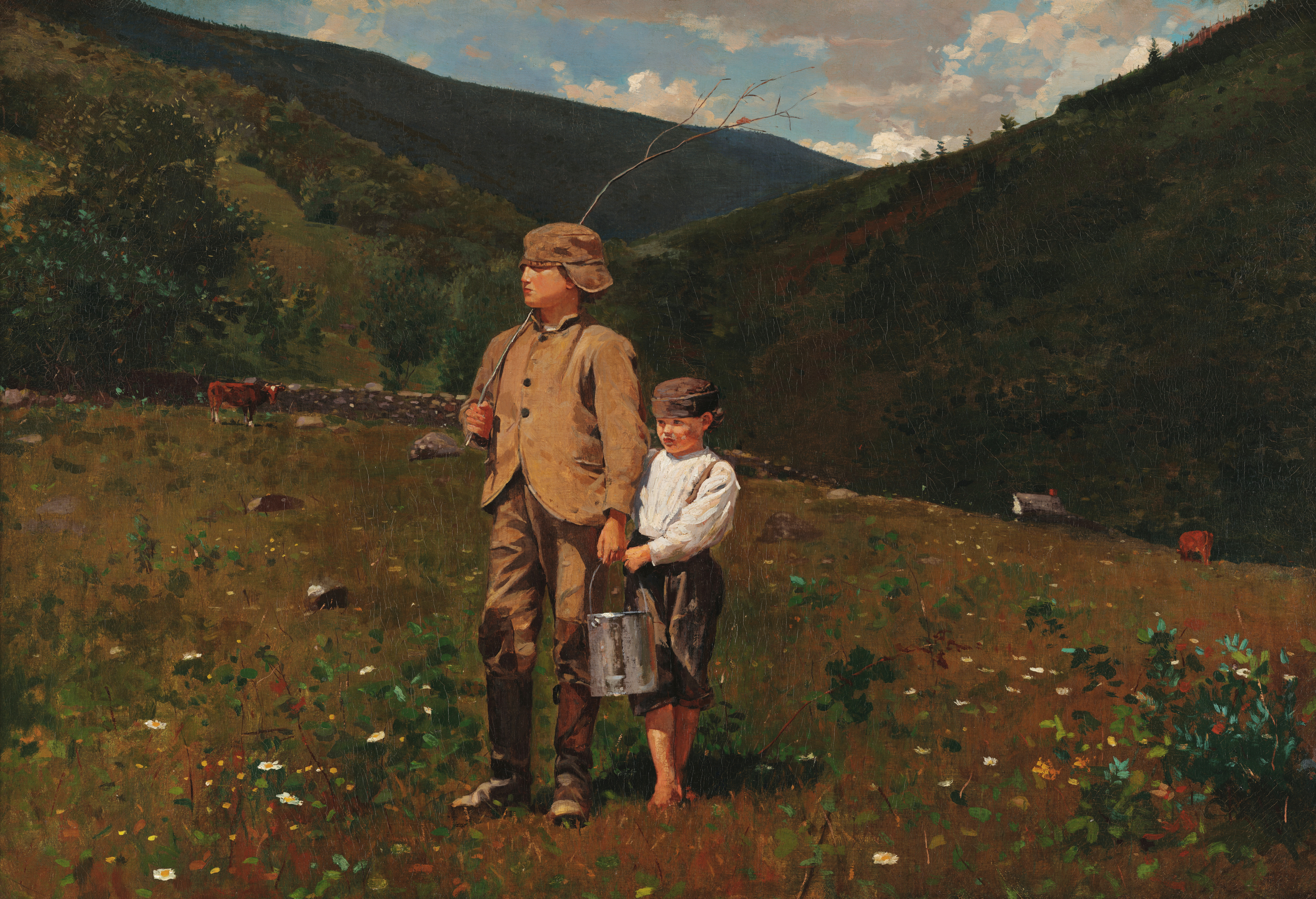
Crossing the Pasture (1871–72; Amon Carter Museum of American Art).

- Acquiring outstanding examples of American painting such as Winslow Homer's Crossing the Pasture, Martin Johnson Heade's Thunderstorm Over Narragansett Bay, Stuart Davis' Blips and Ifs, and works by George Caleb Bingham, Albert Bierstadt, John Marin, Arthur Davies, Marsden Hartley, and Georgia O'Keeffe, and
- Establishing a photography collection that included more than 300,000 images at the time of his death.

For Wilder, the program of an art museum was built around four activities: collecting, research, exhibitions, and publications. In recognition of his emphasis on the importance of exhibition publications the Texas Museum Association created the Mitchell A. Wilder Publication Design Award Competition to promote “the highest standards of graphic design and media production.”

Learning of Wilder's death in 1979, Daniel J. Boorstin, the Librarian of Congress at the time and formerly Director of the Smithsonian Museum of History and Technology, wrote to his widow "He was an ornament to the world of museums and did more than he could ever imagine to promote the understanding of American culture . . . those who have shared his hopes for American culture will not forget him.

== Honors ==
- 1941: Advisor to U.S. Department of State, Cultural Affairs Division, with Robert Woods Bliss, president American Federation of Arts, Washington D.C.; Stephen Carlton Clark, Vice President, Metropolitan Museum of Art, New York; John E. Abbott, executive Vice President, Museum of Modern Art, New York; George Biddle, painter and sculptor, New York; Rene d’Harnoncourt, general manager, Indian arts and crafts board, office of Indian Affairs, Washington, D.C.; Grace McCann Morley, Ph.D. director, San Francisco Museum of Art; Daniel Catton Rich, director of Fine Arts, Art Institute of Chicago; George C. Vaillant, Ph.D. director, University of Pennsylvania.
- 1967: Member, Advisory Board on Environmental Planning, Bureau of Reclamation, Department of the Interior, with Rene D’Harnoncourt, Director Museum of Modern Art, New York; Dr. John D. Entenza, Director of the Graham Foundation for Advanced Studies in Fine Arts, Chicago; Martin Friedman, Director Walker Art Center, Minneapolis; J. B. Jackson, editor of Landscape Magazine in Santa Fe; Dr. David Scott, Director of the Smithsonian's National Collection of Fine Arts, Washington D.C.

== Publications ==
- Santos The Religious Folk Art of New Mexico. The Taylor Museum. Colorado Springs. 1943
- Editor, Catalogue of the Abby Aldrich Rockefeller Folk Art Collection, Williamsburg, Virginia, 1957
- Articles on American art, folk art, and museum topics in HOLIDAY, The ATLANTIC, ART IN AMERICA, IMAGE (England), MUSEUM (UNESCO), LITURGICAL ARTS
- Preparation and editing of gallery guides and exhibition catalogues and weekly radio program for Colorado Springs Fine Arts Center (1945-1953)
