= Ravi Rajan =

American artist and academic administrator

Ravi Rajan FRSA
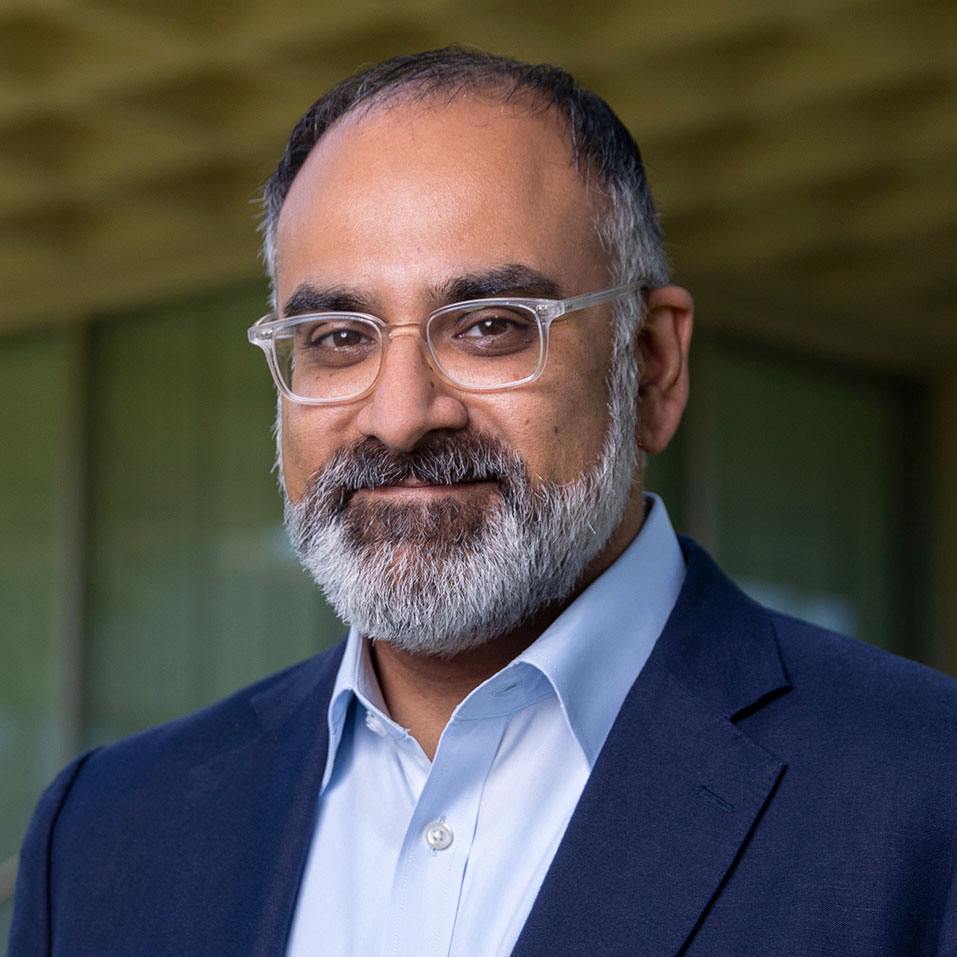

4th President of the California Institute of the Arts
- Incumbent
- Assumed office October 13, 2017
- Preceded by: Steven Lavine

Personal details
- Born: Seattle, Washington, U.S.
- Education: University of Oklahoma (BA); Yale University (MMus)

Academic work
- Discipline: Music, Art
- Sub-discipline: Education
- Institutions: Norman Public Schools; Rockefeller University; State University of New York at Purchase

Ravi S. Rajan is an American musician, artist, and academic administrator working as the fourth president of the California Institute of the Arts.

== Early life and education ==
The son of immigrants from India, Rajan was born in Seattle and raised in Norman, Oklahoma. His father, a physicist working for the Atomic Energy Establishment in Mumbai, quit his job and came to the U.S. to study atmospheric sciences at Colorado State University then the University of Washington, eventually bringing his wife and eldest daughter. His mother, who was initially not allowed to finish High School, stayed in Mumbai taking care of their two daughters, the younger of which became quite ill and died. After her death, she brought her older daughter to Colorado to once again have the family live together. She then worked to support the family, and eventually taught herself to become a computer programmer for the City of Norman and the State of Oklahoma before retiring. Rajan attended the Norman Public Schools and graduated from Norman High, then earned a Bachelor’s degree in music education from the University of Oklahoma and a Master’s in Music from Yale University.

== Career ==
Rajan began his career as a music teacher in the Norman Public Schools. After graduating from Yale, Rajan moved to New York City, where he worked as a designer for Rockefeller University, was a freelance trumpet player, and offered private lessons.

As a trumpet player, Rajan has performed in various musical ensembles in large orchestral, big band, and chamber settings, as well as for theatre on and off Broadway. He was a member of the Tony Awards Nominating Committee.

Rajan was previously dean of the school of the arts, and before that, director of Art+Design and associate dean of the arts at State University of New York at Purchase.

As a producer and designer of large-scale projects and installations, he has worked in major museums, biennials, theaters, festivals, galleries, and venues around the world, for artists including Alfredo Jaar, Stephen Petronio, and Laura Poitras.

In 2010, Rajan was elected a Fellow of the Royal Society of Arts.

In 2026, CalArts students loudly booed Rajan during graduation ceremonies, interrupting his commencement speech. Reasons for the students' protest included labor disputes, the non-renewal of several faculty contracts, and alleged mismanagement of an ongoing budget crisis, which faculty described as a school becoming "richer in paperwork and poorer in pedagogy." Rajan and Charmaine Jefferson, chair of the board of trustees, attempted to calm students and allow Rajan to finish his speech, but were unsuccessful. Rajan has also faced criticism for eliminating creative programs and his support of corporate-sponsored AI adoption at the school.

== Service ==
Rajan is and has been a volunteer leader for many causes that support the arts, education, and social justice including Americans for the Arts; the Asian American Arts Alliance; American Brass Chamber Music Association (ABQ); the National Association of Independent Colleges and Universities; the Association of Independent California Colleges and Universities; the Association of Independent Colleges of Art and Design; the National Association of Schools of Art and Design; the Vermont College of Fine Arts; the Senior College and University Commission; the American Theater Wing; and Yale University.
