= Robert Fitzpatrick (art executive) =

American art executive (1940–2024)

2nd President of the California Institute of the Arts
- In office 1975–1988
- Preceded by: Robert W. Corrigan
- Succeeded by: Steven Lavine

Member of the Baltimore City Council from the 2nd district
- In office 1971–1975
- Preceded by: Clement J. Prucha
- Succeeded by: Nathan Irby

Personal details
- Born: 1940; Toronto, Ontario, Canada
- Died: September 30, 2024 (aged 84); New York, U.S.
- Children: Michael Fitzpatrick

Robert Fitzpatrick (1940 – September 30, 2024) was a Canadian-born American art academic and executive, businessman, and politician.

== Early life and education ==
Fitzpatrick was born in Toronto in 1940. He studied at a Jesuit seminary before heading to Johns Hopkins University to pursue a degree in medieval French.

== Career ==
In 1972, Fitzpatrick was elected as Baltimore, Maryland's youngest city council member while also serving as a professor of medieval French literature and dean of students at Johns Hopkins University. Time Magazine named him one of its "200 Faces for the Future" in 1974.

In 1975, Fitzpatrick was appointed president of California Institute of the Arts (colloquially known as CalArts), where he remained for 12 years. CalArts is an arts institute in Valencia, California, offering undergraduate and graduate arts degrees in visual arts, music, theatre, film and video, dance, animation, and creative writing. In 1987 he resigned as President of CalArts to take the position of head of EuroDisney in Paris.

During his tenure at CalArts, Fitzpatrick served as the director of the 1984 Olympic Arts Festival in Los Angeles, California. He was also the founder and director of the Los Angeles Festival, which grew directly out of the 1984 Olympic Games.

From 1987 to 1993, he served as CEO of Euro Disney Resort, overseeing the creation of the $4 billion theme park and resort: Euro Disneyland, 7 resort hotels, and a dining, entertainment and shopping district (Festival Disney). The resort opened in April 1992, and Fitzpatrick left the company following year.

In 1996, Fitzpatrick became the dean of the School of the Arts at Columbia University in New York City, serving there for two years. He joined the Museum of Contemporary Art in Chicago as its Director and CEO in 1998, holding the longest tenure of any director to date. During his tenure, MCA was awarded the Arts Presenters/MetLife Foundation Award for Excellence in Arts Access.

In February 2008, Fitzpatrick left his position at MCA in order to join the London-based (and Christie's-owned) gallery Haunch of Venison as its international managing director, where he oversaw the opening of Haunch New York, housed at Rockefeller Center. He stepped down from that post in March 2009.

== Personal life and death ==
Fitzpatrick was the father of Michael Fitzpatrick, the titular "Fitz" of the neo soul band Fitz and the Tantrums.

Robert Fitzpatrick lived, studied and worked in Arizona, Texas, the deep south, Baltimore, Los Angeles, Paris, New York, and Chicago. He died in New York on September 30, 2024, at the age of 84.
