= Maryama =

Iranian-American singer and songwriter

Maryam Mirbagheri مریم میرباقری
- Also known as: MARYAMA
- Born: Iran
- Genres: Rock; Soundtrack; Soul
- Occupations: composer, songwriter, Entrepreneur
- Instruments: Vocal, Guitar, Piano, Setar
- Website: maryama-music.com

Maryam Mirbagheri (Persian: مریم میرباقری; born February 18), known professionally as Maryama, is an Iranian-American musician, music executive and entrepreneur based in Los Angeles.

== Early life and education ==
Maryama was born and raised in Iran. Her parents used to live in the United States until they decided to move back to Iran. She later moved to California to study Jazz voice and composition at the American River College and obtained her Bachelor's and master's degrees in Fine Arts in Music Composition and Film Music from the California Institute of the Arts.

== Musical career ==
Maryama started to take guitar lessons starting at an early age and started her first musical band during middle school, and she eventually ended up in Iranian underground music scene. Maryama studied guitar with the Iranian rock stars Ardayan Anzabipour and Homayoun Majdzadeh who were the leaders of the metal band Kahtmayan. After moving to California, she has performed in several jazz festivals and concerts such as Fajr International Music Festival, The Capital Jazz Festival, the Monterey Jazz Festival, and The Columbia Jazz Festival. Maryama also served as the lead singer for ARC Jazz band and performed at the Sacramento Music Festival for 2 consecutive years. During her time in ARC, she studied with the jazz musician Joe Gilman. During her time at CalArts she performed and studied with Pirayeh Pourafar, Ulrich Krieger, Joe LaBarbera and Miroslav Tadić. Mirbagheri scored the music for AT&T sponsored VR experience Pippa's Pan directed by Celine Tien and short film Hereafter directed by Freddy Tang.

In the recent years, she has rose to prominence by scoring the music for award-winning films Forbidden to see us scream in Tehran and The Gift directed by notable Iranian Director Farbod Ardebili. In order to avoid confusions amongst her fans, Mirbagheri has two Spotify artist accounts one under her stage name Maryama which features her singer-songwriter projects and one under her full name Maryam Mirbagheri which features her instrumental film scores and soundtracks.

== Awards ==
Her 2014 single In Zendegist and 2017 single Sufi were both nominated for the Hollywood Music Media Award. She has won the Jazz Downbeat Award with ARC vocal jazz ensemble. Her 2017 debut album named Where the Mermaids Are was mixed and mastered by GRAMMY award-winning producers Marc Urselli and Scott Hull. In 2018, Maryama won the California Video Music Award for Where the Mermaids Are.
