= Earle R. Gister =

Acting teacher (1934–2012)

- Born: March 30, 1934; Racine, Wisconsin, U.S.
- Died: January 22, 2012 (aged 77)
- Occupation: Acting Teacher
- Spouse: Glynda Gister

Earle R. Gister (March 30, 1934 – January 22, 2012) was an American acting teacher and was a pioneer in professional theatre training from the mid-1960s. Earle Gister was renowned for his specialty and passion for the plays of Anton Chekhov.

== Life and career ==
Earle Robert Gister was born and raised in Racine, Wisconsin. After earning his B.A. in history at Carleton College, class of 1956, and a two year stint in the United States Army, he attended Tulane University in New Orleans where he was an editor of the Tulane Drama Review. He credited the foundation of his acting technique to his studies with such people as Robert W. Corrigan, whom he first met at Carleton, the extraordinary faculty at Carnegie Mellon University in the mid-60s and the creativity of the remarkable students he had the privilege of teaching. Robert Corrigan was a mentor to Gister and invited him to Carnegie Mellon University when he was appointed to head the Drama Department in 1962. When Corrigan left Carnegie Mellon University a few years later, Gister took over as head of the department until 1975. After leaving Carnegie Mellon University, Gister went to the City College of New York where he headed the Aaron Davis Center for the Arts as its inaugural Director.

Lloyd Richards who was the dean of the Yale School of Drama, invited Gister to Yale to be his associate dean of the Drama School, which was a position he held from 1979 to 1999. Earle Gister worked as a master acting teacher. Earle was named the first Lloyd Richards Adjunct Professor of Drama in 1994. Following Richards, Stan Wojewodski Jr., took over the stewardship of the Yale School of Drama from 1991 to 2002. For a total of 19 years Earle Gister was Associate Dean of Academic Affairs and Chair of the MFA Acting Program at the Yale School of Drama. In 1999, Gister retired from the Yale School of Drama.

In 1991 Gister shared a Tony Award with the Yale School of Drama and the Yale Repertory Theatre. He was a member of the National Theatre Conference starting in 1967, a founding member of the League of Professional Theatre Training Programs since 1972. He was on the Tony Award nominating committee member starting in 1980, and a member the first grants award panel in theater for the National Endowment for the Arts.

Earle Gister was a Co-founder of the League of Professional Theatre Training Programs, advisor to the National Endowment for the Arts, and co-chair of the training panel of the Theatre Communications Group. Gister has played a significant role in the nurturing and development of most of the major theatre training programs in the United States.

Earle Gister also was the co-founder, with Lynne Melillo Bolton, of White Heron Theatre Company in New York City. He made his New York directing debut with a production of Anton Chekhov's The Seagull, presented by White Heron at Second Stage Theatre. After Mr. Gister's death, Ms. Bolton moved White Heron to Nantucket, where, with new partner Michael Kopko, she has established it as a professional Equity theater that produces classical works and develops new plays for the world stage.

== Professional History ==
James Bundy, dean of the Yale School of Drama and artistic director of Yale Repertory Theatre, is quoted in Playbill.com saying of Gister, "I can vividly recall his galvanic effect on so many actors, his insightful and soulful readings of the given circumstances of great plays, his deeply thoughtful notes and advice, and his love of ice cream. It is astonishing to think of the breadth of talent that Earle brought to Yale and nurtured here, and it is worth remembering that for years, when he was asked to name the greatest strength of the School of Drama, his inevitably generous reply was, 'the students.'"

Gister taught at Carnegie Mellon University, the City College of New York and the Yale School of Drama. He was the Associate Dean and Chairman of the Acting Department at the Yale School of Drama, and the Chairman of the Drama Department at Carnegie Mellon University.

== Board Memberships and Affiliations ==
- Teacher and Board Member-The Actors Center
- Board Member (past)-Leonard Davis Center
