= Norman High School =

Coordinates: 35.218429°N 97.456177°W

Location
- 911 W. Main Street; Norman, Oklahoma 73069; United States

Information
- Type: Co-Educational, Public, Secondary
- Motto: Norman High School expects excellence, responsibility, and respect among all members of the learning community.
- Established: 1891
- School district: Norman Public Schools
- Authority: Oklahoma State Department of Education
- Principal: Hallie Wright
- Faculty: 127
- Teaching staff: 106.48 (on an FTE basis)
- Grades: 9–12
- Enrollment: 2,132 (2023-2024)
- Student to teacher ratio: 20.02
- Colors: Orange and black
- Athletics conference: OSSAA Class 6A-Division I District 1
- Sports: Baseball, Basketball, Cheer, Cross Country, Football, Golf, Pom, Softball, Soccer, Sports Medicine, Swimming, Track & Field, Volleyball, Wrestling, and rugby.
- Mascot: Tigers
- Newspaper: The Tiger Tribune
- Yearbook: The Trail
- Website: www.normanpublicschools.org/o/nhs

Norman High School is a four-year public high school in Norman, Oklahoma, with a steady enrollment of approximately 2,000 students. It is accredited by North Central Association, the Oklahoma State Department of Education and the Oklahoma Secondary School Activities Association. The school year consists of two 15-week semesters with a 6 class flexible schedule, consisting of 52 minute periods. Norman High School is part of the Norman Independent School District No. 29 of Cleveland County, Oklahoma, more commonly known as Norman Public Schools (NPS). Norman High was ranked as one of the top 1,400 high schools in the United States in 2009.

== History ==
Norman High School's history began in 1890 with the construction of the township's first high school, located at what was then the west side of the city. The institution was the only educational facility in Norman, tutoring students from elementary through high school. In the early 1900s, the original high school building burned down following an attempt to condemn the school. After the fire, Norman lacked an official high school building for 15–19 years. During this time, students were taught in homes, businesses, churches and other facilities. The second structure to house Norman High was located off of Porter Avenue and was used until 1954 when the current building was constructed, leaving the old building to become Central Mid-High, and eventually, Longfellow Middle School.

In 2014, students and community members staged a protest amid allegations that the school mishandled a rape investigation and "punished the victims for being victims." The school expelled the alleged rapist, and when charges were formally brought against him, a spokesperson for Norman Public Schools released a statement that the school district's leadership was "pleased that charges were filed." Court proceedings resulted in a 10-year prison sentence, of which eight were suspended.

== Academics ==
Curriculum highlights include:

=== CareerTech ===
Students interested in technical and career-specific skills to prepare for such careers as automotive, child care, computers, construction, cosmetology, industrial technology, health care, or landscaping may Dual Enroll in one- or two-year programs at Moore Norman Technology Center, affiliated with the Oklahoma Department of Career and Technology Education.

=== Dual enrollment ===
Juniors and seniors may take courses at local colleges and universities, including the University of Oklahoma, Rose State College, and Oklahoma City Community College.

=== Communications ===
Norman High's student newspaper, The Tiger Tribune (formerly TigerTalk) has received multiple awards for its student journalism. In 2009, The Tiger Tribune was awarded the OIPA Sweepstakes award, the highest honor awarded for high school newspapers in Oklahoma. Media students also have the ability to study broadcasting, production, and videography in association with local Public-access television channel 18.

=== Yearbook ===
Students in yearbook produce The Trail yearbook, which has also received state and national level awards.

The Norman High School Trail yearbook placed in the top three Division 1 yearbooks in the state at Oklahoma Scholastic Media's Fall Media in 2013.

At the National Scholastic Press Association Conference in Boston, the 2012–13 Edition of The Trail won first place in the Best in Show competition for yearbooks that are 275–324 pages.

=== Special education ===
Norman Public Schools provides comprehensive services to many qualifying students.

=== Fine and performing arts ===
Norman High offers a wide array of courses allowing for an in-depth exploration of the arts, including drawing and painting, photography, debate, acting, music, and modern dance.

==== Music ====
The music department encompasses the marching band, three concert bands (Wind Ensemble, Symphonic Band, & Concert Band), two concert orchestras (Symphonic and Philharmonia), and several choirs.

=== Alternative education ===
An alternative high school program offers a different approach to learning with a nontraditional curriculum in a more structured environment.

=== Guidance and counseling ===
A team of five counselors provides support and services to students in areas including course placement, personal adjustment, and college and career counseling. The counselors offer students the opportunity to individualize their education plans to better suit their needs starting next school year as part of the IEP (Individual Education Plan) program.

=== Advanced course offerings ===
Norman High provides students with Advanced Placement (AP) coursework in a variety of subjects including Computer Science, Psychology, Studio Art, English Literature & Composition, English Language & Composition, United States History, Government, Human Geography, Biology, Chemistry, Physics C, Calculus AB and BC, and Spanish.

Also available are the two-year, mentored AEGIS English and AEGIS Math programs. Students can apply at the end of their sophomore year, and 20–25 students are selected for each program.

=== Graduation requirements ===
- English – 4 units
- Math – 3 units (Algebra I or greater)
- Science – 3 units
- World History – 1 unit
- U.S. History – 1 unit
- U.S. Government – 1/2 unit
- Oklahoma History – 1/2 unit
- Electives – 8 units
- Fine Arts – 2 unit

Total – 23 units

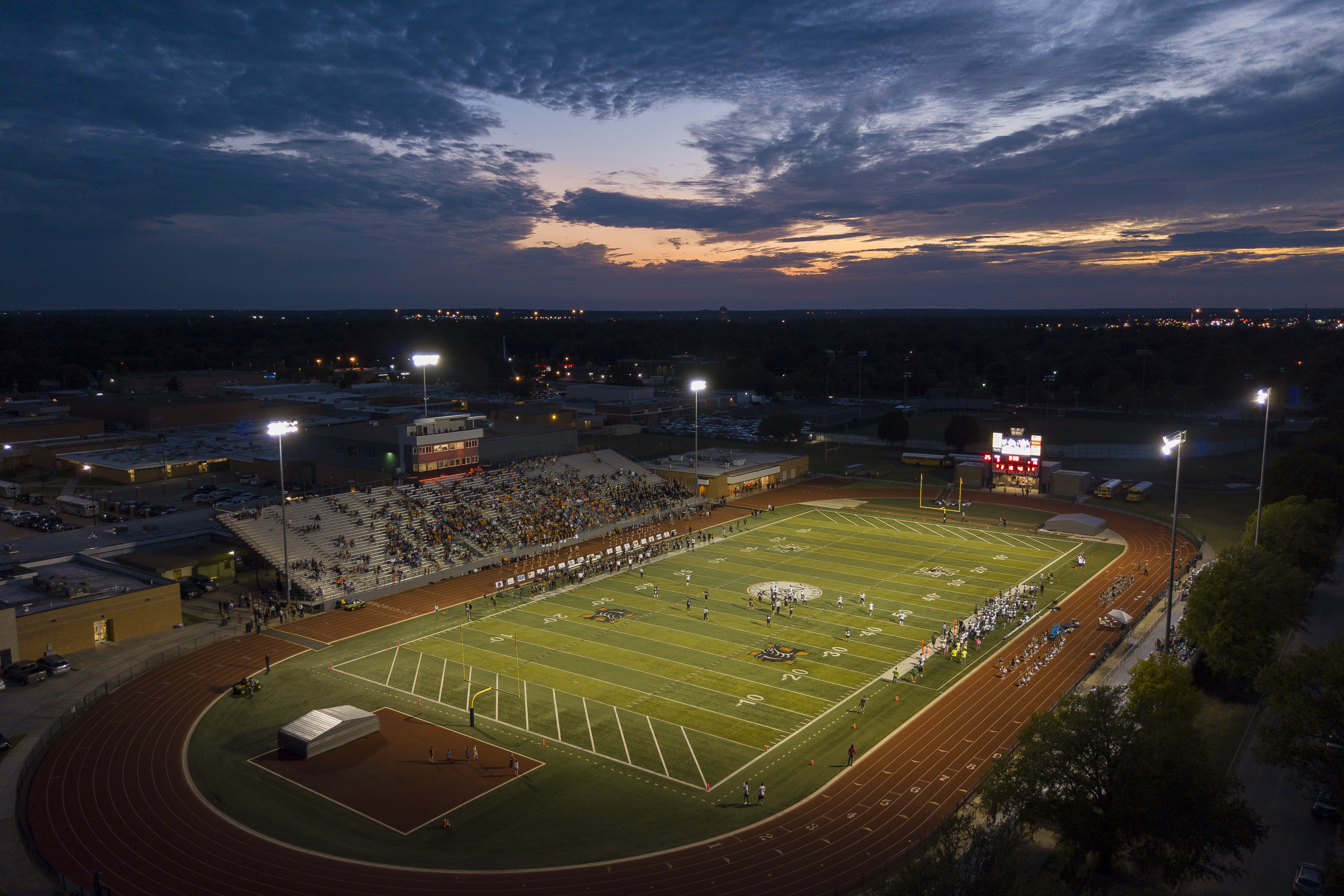
Norman High School football field and track in 2017. Left in the background is Norman High School.

== Athletics ==
Norman High School has a rich tradition in athletics, having won a state championship in women's basketball in 2005, men's basketball in 1955, 1963 and 1970, 1990 (28–0), 1999 and 2026; women's soccer in 2004 and 2005; boys' soccer in 1986, 1993, 1997, and 1999; football in 1992; baseball in 1958 and 1995; girls' basketball in 1995; boys' cross country in 2011; and girls' cross country in 2017.

=== Awards ===
The Tiger Tribune, the monthly student newspaper, won the OSM/OIPA All-Oklahoman award in 2008, 2009 and 2010. At the 2010 OSM/OIPA Spring Media Monday the newspaper won the All-Oklahoman award. In 2009 the newspaper won the coveted OSM/OIPA Sweepstakes award, the highest award given by OSM/OIPA. Along with the Sweepstakes and the All-Oklahoman awards, the newspaper won the Spirit Award at the annual Spring Media Monday of 2009.

The Norman High Botball robotics team did very well at the Oklahoma Botball Regional competition as well as at the National competition from 2002 to 2007, including two national championships in 2005 and 2006 under the leadership of John W. Romanishin '07, now a researcher in the MIT Distributed Robotics Laboratory. The team also won the Global Competition in 2018.

The speech and debate team lost the state championship in speech and debate for the first time in 1998. It then won the state championship in 2000, 2001, 2002, 2004, 2006, 2008, 2014, 2016, and 2017. They also regularly send teams of four to five students to the National Debate Tournament held in June by the National Forensic League, sending a record 14 students in the summer of 2006. The National Speech and Debate Association champion in Lincoln-Douglas debate for 2015, Nicky Halterman, was from Norman High School.

Norman High has produced numerous National Merit Scholars and Presidential Scholars.

In 1989 Norman High School was awarded the Oklahoma Blue Ribbon award of excellence.

== Notable alumni ==
=== Basketball ===
- Jimmy McNatt, '36, All-American for OU, played in first-ever NCAA Final Four in 1939, starred for AAU's Phillips 66ers in the 1940s
- Kellen McCoy, '05, All-American for Weber State, professional for ETB Wohnbau Baskets in Germany, and then with Borås Basket in Sweden. McCoy is currently the head coach of girls basketball at Norman North High School in Norman, Oklahoma.

=== Football ===
- Scott Blanton, '91 Washington Redskins kicker
- Ryan Broyles, '07 University of Oklahoma
- George Kittle, '12 University of Iowa, San Francisco 49ers tight end
- Mossis Madu, '06 University of Oklahoma, Tampa Bay Buccaneers
- Tyrell Peters, University of Oklahoma, NFL linebacker
- Zac Selmon, '03, Wake Forest tight end, Mississippi State athletic director
- Press Taylor, '06 Marshall University, Philadelphia Eagles assistant coach
- Zac Taylor, '02 Nebraska Cornhuskers: 2006 Big 12 Conference Offensive Player of the Year, Miami Dolphins assistant coach, head coach of the Cincinnati Bengals
- J. T. Thatcher, University of Oklahoma, Oakland Raiders

=== Baseball ===
- Cade Horton, Minor League
- Jake Jewell, Major League Baseball player
- Daniel McCutchen, Major League Baseball player
- John Russell, '79, Major League Baseball player, former manager of the Pittsburgh Pirates
- Joe Simpson, '70, Major League Baseball player and announcer

=== Arts and entertainment ===
- Dean Cameron (Eikleberry), '80, actor
- Greg Coolidge, '87, actor/writer/director/producer
- Christopher Cousins, actor
- James Garner (Bumgarner), actor
- Denise Masters Jones, '87, singer and a founding member of the Christian band Point of Grace
- Megyn Price, '88, actress
- Ravi S. Rajan, ‘93, artist and academic
- Milena Govich, '95, actress

=== Government and law ===
- Lucy Koh, '86, United States Circuit Judge, first federal district court judge of Korean descent in the United States, and first Korean American female federal circuit judge in the United States
- Stephanie Byers, ‘81, former Kansas State Legislator, first transgender Native American elected to a state legislature in the United States.

=== Academia ===
- Keith Johnson, '76, phonetician at the University of California, Berkeley PhonLab

=== Other ===
- Bruce Friedrich, '87, animal rights activist and author
