= Chie Yamayoshi =

American video artist

Chie Yamayoshi is a Los Angeles-based video artist and filmmaker.

Yamayoshi was raised in Japan, where she worked as a TV director and newscaster. After leaving commercial industry and starting an avant-garde art-making practice, Yamayoshi moved to the US under the Japanese Government Overseas Programme for Artists. She received an MFA in Film and Video from CalArts, and a MFA in Studio Art from UC, Irvine.

She has shown her work prolifically and internationally including Laguna Art Museum, UCLA Hammer Museum of Art, REDCAT Theater, Los Angeles Contemporary Exhibitions, Art Chicago, Collectif Jeune Cinéma in Paris, "Kino Pavasaris" at Vilnius in Lithuania, A Street in Poznan, Poland, and Gallery Suzuki at Kyoto, Japan.
