= Steven Lavine =

Steve Lavine
- Born: Steven Lavine; Sparta, Wisconsin, U.S.

Academic background
- Education: Stanford University (BA); Harvard University (MA, PhD)

3rd President of the California Institute of the Arts
- In office 1988–2017
- Preceded by: Robert Fitzpatrick
- Succeeded by: Ravi Rajan

Steven D. Lavine is an American academic administrator who was the president of the California Institute of the Arts. He stepped down from that position in June 2017, after 29 years in the post.

== Early life ==
Lavine was born in Sparta, Wisconsin.Lavine grew up in Superior, Wisconsin. His father was a house call doctor, and his mother was a gifted pianist, reciting compositions of Sergei Rachmaninoff and Pyotr Ilyich Tchaikovsky at home. Lavine cites artistic works like Bob Dylan's debut album and Alain Resnais' film Hiroshima mon amour as early influences in developing his interests in the arts.

He earned a Bachelor of Arts degree from Stanford University, followed by a Master of Arts and PhD in English and American literature from Harvard University. While at Stanford, he was influenced by his professors H. Bruce Franklin, and Larry Friedlander.

== Career ==
Through the professional recommendation of Martin Friedman, then-director of the Walker Art Center, Lavine was put in contact with CalArts's Board of Trustees. In 1988, he was appointed its president, after serving as associate director for arts and humanities at the Rockefeller Foundation.

In 1991, with Ivan Karp, Lavine co-edited "Exhibiting Cultures: The Poetics and Politics of Museum Display".

=== CalArts ===
As the third president of CalArts, Lavine oversaw the naming of The Sharon Disney Lund School of Dance, The Herb Alpert School of Music, and REDCAT, the Roy and Edna Disney CalArts Theater that opened in the Walt Disney Concert Hall in downtown Los Angeles.

== Personal life ==
Lavine is married to writer and artist Janet Sternburg.
