= Maurice R. Stein =

American sociologist (1926–2023)

Maurice Robert Stein (September 19, 1926 – August 18, 2023) was an American sociologist and innovator in higher education. Stein is co-recipient of the 1987 Robert and Helen Lynd Lifetime Achievement Award bestowed by the American Sociological Association's Community and Urban Sociology Section, while his pedagogical innovations have been highlighted of late by Harvard University's Jeffrey Schnapp in Schnapp's studies in the digital humanities (see, for example, the interactive companion site to Stein's Blueprint for Counter Education). Retired from Brandeis University from 2002, Stein resided with his spouse, Phyllis Stein (née Rosenstein), at their home in Cambridge, Massachusetts, and was a long-time member of the Harvard Institute for Learning in Retirement.

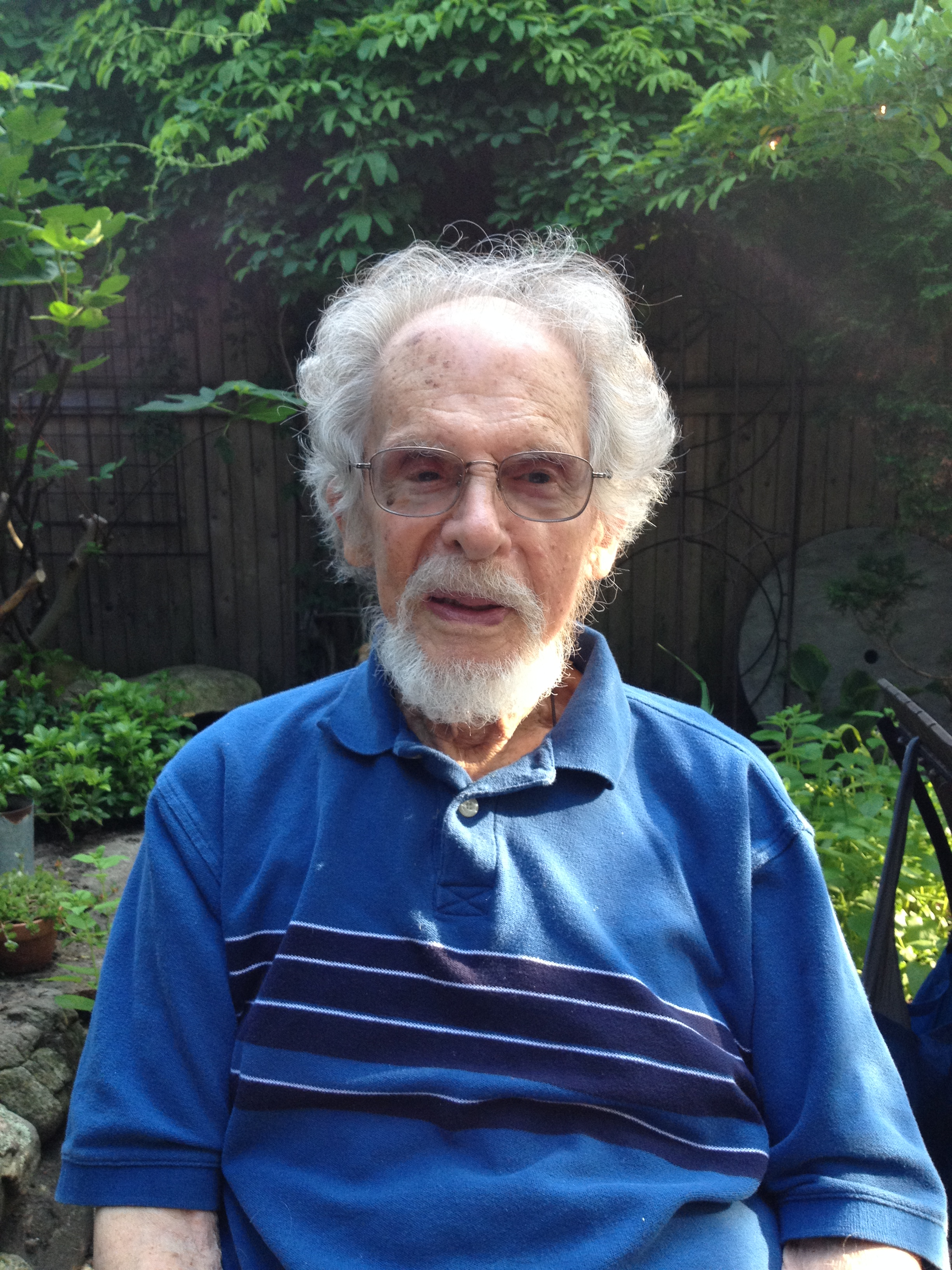
Maurice Stein, June 2017

== Early life and education ==
Stein was born on September 19, 1926 in Buffalo, New York, where he was raised in the Jewish community. After a tour of duty in the Second World War, he earned his B.A. at the University of Buffalo, where he led the fieldwork and co-authored the methodological appendix for Alvin W. Gouldner's famous study, Patterns of Industrial Bureaucracy (1954) Stein received his doctorate in sociology from Columbia University in 1958 on the strength of a dissertation which would become a classic in sociology, The Eclipse of Community (1960).

== Main works in sociology ==
Stein's principal contribution to sociology is perhaps best captured in his contribution to Reflections on Community Studies (1964) as well as the aforementioned studies. A student of Erik Erikson and colleague of such figures as Morrie S. Schwartz, Stein's co-edited Identity and Anxiety (1960) received acclaim and wide circulation, while his co-edited Sociology on Trial (1963), dedicated to C. Wright Mills, and his contribution to The Critical Spirit (1967), a festschrift for Herbert Marcuse, together reflects Stein's critical approach to sociology and to social, political, cultural, and aesthetic theory generally.

== Pedagogical innovation ==
Never a conventional sociologist, Stein actively joined in support of sixties student, anti-war, and other later liberation movements, helped found the graduate program in sociology at Brandeis University and later served as chair of the department from 1966-1969, co-authored Blueprint for Counter Education (1970), and served as founding dean of the School of Critical Studies at the California Institute of the Arts. Influenced by such sources as the Bauhaus, Black Mountain College, and Buddhism, as well as by his participation in the early years of the then-experimental curriculum at Brandeis University (founded in 1948), Stein pioneered use of peer teaching, subaltern texts, and meditation practices over twenty-five years of teaching the course "The Sociology of Birth & Death" to thousands of Brandeis undergraduates. These practices are just a few of the highlights of a career that spans fifty years dedicated to higher education.

== Blueprint exhibition ==
Originally published in 1970, Stein and Miller's Blueprint for Counter Education was a pedagogical project that proposed a process-based approach to education. It included a publication, a set of posters designed as to be a portable learning environment, a reading list and a checklist. It is considered one of the defining pedagogical projects of the Vietnam war era.. It has been featured in the following exhibits and installations: "Information" Museum of Modern Art (MOMA), New York NY, Summer 1970; "Blueprint for Counter Education in its time" MOMA PS1, Queens NY, September 2015; "Hippie Modernism: The Search for Utopia" Walker Arts Center, Minneapolis MN, Winter 2015-2016; "Blueprint for Counter Education in its time" Carpenter Center for the Visual Arts, Harvard University, Cambridge MA, April 2016; "Hippie Modernism: the Search for Utopia" Cranbrook Museum, Dearborn MI, Spring 2016; "Learning Laboratories: Architecture, Instructional Technologies and the Social Production of Pedagogical Space around 1970" BAK (Basis Voor Actuele Kunst), Utrecht Netherlands, Winter 2016-2017; "Land Grant" Krannert Art Museum, University of Illinois, Champaign IL, 2016; "Blueprint for Counter Education Vassar College Library, Poughkeepsie NY, September 2017; "Hippie Modernism: The Search for Utopia" Berkeley Art Museum, Berkeley CA, Spring 2017; Rose Art Museum, Brandeis University, Waltham MA, March 2018; Victor Papenek, The Politics of Design, Vitra Design Museum, Weil am Rhein, Germany, September March 2018; forthcoming: Education Shock, Learning, Politics and Architecture in the 1960s and 70s, HKW, Haus der Kultureen der Welt, Berlin, Germany, January 2021.

== Death ==
Stein died in Cambridge, Massachusetts on August 18, 2023, at the age of 96.
