= Carole Holliday =

American film director

- Occupations: Animator; Artist

Carole Holliday is an American animator, storyboard artist, director, and founder of Crowded Metro Films. She initially wanted to be a theatre actress, but went into animation instead to avoid compromising her Christian faith. She graduated from California Institute of the Arts with a BFA in animation. Combining her love of theatre and drawing, she found a passion in story boarding. Holliday worked as an animation assistant on several films, such as Oliver and Company (1988) and The Little Mermaid (1989), before she began a career in story boarding on A Goofy Movie (1995). She was also a story artist on the DreamWorks feature film The Prince of Egypt (1998) and Disney's feature films Tarzan (1999) and The Jungle Book 2. Additionally, she worked as a character design supervisor on the Disney short John Henry (2000). In 2004, she moved up to directing Donald’s Gift with DisneyToon Studios as part of Mickey's Twice Upon a Christmas

She directed her own live action short film Witt’s Daughter (2008) which won the Best Narrative Short Award at the 2009 GI film festival. She has done storyboard revisions on Disney Television Animation's Sofia the First (2015) and has been working on Elena of Avalor story books.

== Education ==
California Institute of the Arts, BFA in Animation

== Filmography ==
- 1985: The Pound Puppies (Hanna-Barbera - Character Design)
- 1986: My Little Pony n’ Friends (Sunbow Productions - Model Design)
- 1987: The Ice Goose Comet (Bakshi Animation - Mighty Mouse - Character Design)
- 1988: Oliver & Company (Disney - Disney Theatrical Feature - Animating Assistant)
- 1989: The Little Mermaid (Disney - Disney Theatrical Feature - Animating Assistant)
- 1991: Rover Dangerfield (Hyperion Pictures - Feature Films: Warner Brothers - Character Animation)
- 1993: Wish Upon a Starfish (Disney Television Animation - Little Mermaid - Character Animation)
- 1995: A Goofy Movie (Disney - Feature Films: Disney – Animator, Character Design, Storyboards)
- 1998: The Prince of Egypt (DreamWorks Animation - Feature Films: DreamWorks - Additional Story)
- 1999: Tarzan (Disney - Disney Theatrical Feature - Story)
- 2000: John Henry (Disney - Character Design Supervisor)
- 2001:
  - Tarzan and the Race Against Time (Disney Television Animation - The Legend of Tarzan – Story boards)
  - Tarzan and the Protégé (Disney Television Animation - Legend of Tarzan, The - Storyboards)
- 2003: The Jungle Book 2 (Disneytoon Studios - Storyboards)
- 2004:
  - Winnie the Pooh: Springtime with Roo (Disneytoon Studios - Storyboard Artist)
  - Mickey, Donald, Goofy: The Three Musketeers (DisneyToon Studios - Storyboard Artist)
  - Donald's Gift (DisneyToon Studios – Story, story director, screenplay)
  - Home on the Range (Disney - Character Design)
- 2006: Bambi II (DisneyToon Studios - Storyboard Artist)
  - Brother Bear 2 (DisneyToon Studios - Storyboard Artist)
- 2009: Tinker Bell and the Lost Treasure (DisneyToon Studios - Disney Fairies - Storyboard Artist)
- 2011: Tom and Jerry & the Wizard of Oz (Warner Brothers - Storyboards)
- 2015: Buttercup Amber (Disney Television Animation - Sofia the First - Storyboard Revisions)

=== Storybooks ===
Elena of Avalor, Sofia the First, Mickey Mouse Clubhouse, Superbooks, Alpha and Omega, 3-2-1 Penguins!

=== References ===
7. Carole Holliday podcast interview Ink and Paint Girls
