= Norman Public Schools =

School district in Oklahoma

Coordinates: 35.2174°N 97.4524°W

Location
- 131 South Flood Avenue; Norman, Oklahoma 73069 United States

District information
- Type: Public, Primary, Secondary, Co-Educational
- Motto: Our mission is to prepare and inspire all students to achieve their full potential.
- Superintendent: Dr. Nick Migliorino
- Schools: 24

Students and staff
- Students: 16,000+
- Teachers: about 1,200

Other information
- Website: www.normanpublicschools.org

Norman Public Schools (formally known as Independent School District Number 29 of Cleveland County, Oklahoma) is a public school district serving parts of Norman, Oklahoma, United States. There are over 15,000 students enrolled in the district. The district consists of 17 elementary schools, four middle schools, and three high schools.

The majority of the district is in Cleveland County, and the majority of Norman is in this school district. The district extends into McClain County, where it includes portions of Goldsby and Newcastle.

== High schools ==
There are three high schools in the Norman Public Schools district:

- Norman High School
- Norman North High School
- Dimensions High School

== Middle schools ==
The middle schools in the district are named for famous American writers. The middle schools are as follows:

- Alcott Middle School
- Irving Middle School
- Longfellow Middle School
- Whittier Middle School

== Elementary schools ==
Sixteen of the elementary schools in the district are named for presidents of the United States, while one school's name was inspired by its close proximity to Lakeview. The elementary schools are:

- Adams Elementary School
- Cleveland Elementary School
- Eisenhower Elementary School
- Jackson Elementary School
- Jefferson Elementary School
- Kennedy Elementary School
- Lakeview Elementary School
- Lincoln Elementary School
- Madison Elementary School
- McKinley Elementary School
- Monroe Elementary School
- Reagan Elementary School
- Roosevelt Elementary School
- Truman Elementary School (grades 3–5)
- Truman Primary Elementary School (preK-2nd grade)
- Washington Elementary School
- Wilson Elementary School
