= John P. Hogan =

John P. Hogan can refer to:

- John Paul Hogan (1919–2012), American chemist
- John Philip Hogan (1881–1961), American civil engineer
