= Nelbert Chouinard =

American artist (1879–1969)

- Born: Nelbertina Murphy; February 9, 1879; Montevideo, Minnesota, U.S.
- Died: July 9, 1969 (aged 90); South Pasadena, California, U.S.
- Education: Pratt Institute
- Website: www.chouinardfoundation.org

Nelbert Chouinard (born Nelbertina Murphy; 1879–1969) was an American artist who founded the Chouinard Arts Institute (1921) in Los Angeles, California. The Institute had a great influence on artists and art education, creating progressive educational pathways that helped incubate artists who, in turn, defined many directions in the arts—from visual art and design, to fashion and costume design, animation and motion pictures. Her partnership with Walt and Roy Disney created the foundation for what is today the California Institute of the Arts.

== Education ==
Nelbert Murphy began her art education at Windom Institute in her hometown of Montevideo, Minnesota. She was a 1904 graduate in fine art, from the Pratt Institute in New York.

== Career ==
=== Teaching ===
After graduating from Pratt, she began her teaching career in the Orange, NJ public school system. She spent her summers at home in Minnesota working with the Handicraft Guild in Minneapolis where she taught leather craft art under the guidance of Earnest Batchelder. When her parents relocated from Minnesota to South Pasadena, California, in 1909, Nelbert Murphy joined them and taught at Throop Polytechnic, now Caltech, with Ernest Batchelder. Her progressive art pedagogy, influenced by John Dewey's philosophy, was honed further in teaching posts starting in 1916 in El Paso, TX and in 1917 in Washington D.C. In 1918 the now Nelbert Chouinard moved back to South Pasadena and was recruited to become a founding faculty member of the art institute being formed by Harrison Gray Otis and the Los Angeles Museum of History, Science, and Art. Upon opening, the school was called the Otis Art Institute.

=== Founding the Chouinard Arts Institute and CalArts ===
Dissatisfied with the traditional pedagogical model being formed at Otis, in 1921 Mrs. Chouinard founded the Chouinard Art Institute in a building on the south side of MacArthur Park, which was around the corner from the former Otis mansion where she had helped establish the art school for the county. Early on, Walt Disney recognized Mrs. Chouinard's Dewey-influenced progressive and future-looking approach to art pedagogy as revolutionary to the training of artists, and hired the Institute directly to train his animation artists. The school quickly became known by its distinguished roster of alumni as one of the greatest art schools in the world. Throughout the 1930s and 1940s, through the Great Depression and World War II, Mrs. Chouinard managed to keep the school going with the financial help of Mr. Disney. By 1962, Mrs. Chouinard, in failing health, was unable to continue at the helm and the school continued to struggle financially. Mr. Disney, who by that point was a Chouinard Art Institute board member and long-time believer in her efforts, was asked by Mrs. Chouinard and the other members of the board to take on the directorship in order to continue the school. He agreed under the condition that he could expand the progressive pedagogy for which Mrs. Chouinard was known, merge it with the Los Angeles Conservatory of Music (started in 1883) which followed a similar progressive philosophy, and expand it to include all the art forms, with a focus on experimentation and the exploration of new forms of arts. Under Disney's new vision, the school merged with the Conservatory, and was renamed California Institute for the Arts (CalArts). The choice of CalArts as a name was intentional, to draw connection to the progressive educational beginnings of the Throop Polytechnic, where Mrs. Chouinard started teaching in California, which had become the California Institute of Technology.

== Personal life ==
Nelbert Murphy married Horace "Burt" Chouinard, widower and retired Spanish–American War army chaplain, in 1916. The couple lived briefly in El Paso, Texas and later in Washington, D.C. When Horace Chouinard died of cancer only two years later, Nelbert M. Chouinard moved back to South Pasadena, California where she lived for the rest of her life. She was known thereafter as "Mrs. Chouinard", never remarried, and always wore her wedding ring.
