= Robert W. Corrigan =

American academic

Robert Willoughby Corrigan (September 23, 1927 – September 1, 1993) was an American academic and the founding editor of the Carleton Drama Review, which later became TDR: The Drama Review.

Robert Willoughby Corrigan was born in Portage, Wisconsin, on 23 September 1927. His father was an Episcopal bishop. The younger Corrigan earned a bachelor's degree at Cornell University in 1950, followed by a master's degree from Johns Hopkins University two years later. In 1955, Corrigan completed a doctorate in comparative literature from the University of Minnesota. He founded the Carleton Drama Review later that year shortly after joining the faculty of Carleton College. When Corrigan began teaching at Tulane University in 1957, the academic journal went with him and was renamed the Tulane Drama Review. Richard Schechner became chief editor of the journal when Corrigan took a position at Carnegie Mellon University in 1962. Corrigan was the inaugural dean of the New York University School of the Arts, established in 1965. In 1970, he was named the president of the California Institute of the Arts, three years after he began teaching there. Corrigan resigned from CalArts in May 1972, and later taught at the University of Michigan, as well as the University of Wisconsin–Milwaukee, where he served as dean of the School of Fine Arts. Corrigan assumed the deanship at the School of Arts and Humanities at the University of Texas at Dallas in 1984, where he remained until his August 1992 resignation. He died in Dallas on 1 September 1993, of Shy–Drager syndrome.
