= Underskirt =

Underskirt may refer to the following:

- Half slip, a modern undergarment worn by women beneath a dress or skirt to help it hang smoothly
- Petticoat, an undergarment to be worn by women under a skirt, dress or sari
