= Vosbury =

Vosbury is a surname. Notable people with the surname include:

- C. Edward Vosbury (fl. 1899–1907), American architect
- Cole Vosbury (born 1991), American singer, songwriter, producer, and musician

== See also ==
- Vosburg, town in South Africa
