= Michele Taylor (disambiguation) =

Michèle Taylor (fl. from 2012) is an American politician and diplomat.

Michele Taylor or Michelle Taylor may also refer to:

- Michele Martin Taylor (born 1946), American fine art painter
- Michele Anne Taylor (born 1965), or Michele Anne Harris, American who disappeared in 2001
- Feminista Jones (Michelle Taylor, fl. from 2013), American social worker and writer
- Michelle Taylor (runner) (born 1967), American sprinter and runner, winner of the 1987 4 × 400 meter relay at the NCAA Division I Outdoor Track and Field Championships
- Michelle Taylor, convicted and then acquitted of the murder of Alison Shaughnessy in London in 1991
