= Roberson Mansion =

Historic house in New York, United States

- U.S. National Register of Historic Places
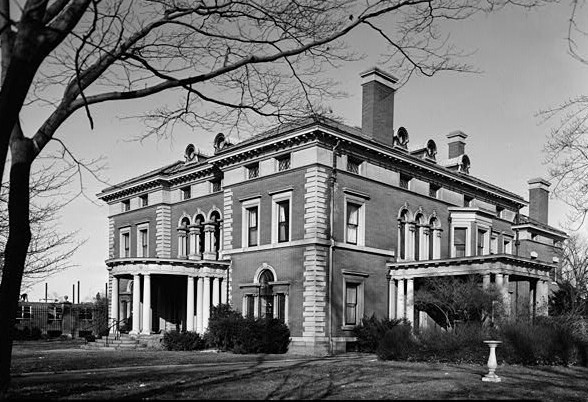
- Alonzo Roberson House

- Location within New York Location within the United States
- Interactive map showing the location for Roberson Mansion
- Location: 30 Front St., Binghamton, New York
- Coordinates: 42°5′39″N 75°55′8″W
- Built: 1904
- Architect: C. Edward Vosbury
- Architectural style: Late 19th And 20th Century Revivals, Federal
- NRHP reference No.: 80002591
- Added to NRHP: March 25, 1980

The Roberson Mansion, part of the Roberson Museum and Science Center, is a home in Binghamton, New York. It is an Italian Renaissance style house, designed by Binghamton architect C. Edward Vosbury and built in 1904, and completed in 1907, for Alonzo Roberson Jr. and his wife Margaret Hays Roberson. It was built with all of the then modern conveniences: an elevator, central heat, combination gas and electric lighting, a dumb waiter, an intercom system, and a private bath for each bedroom.

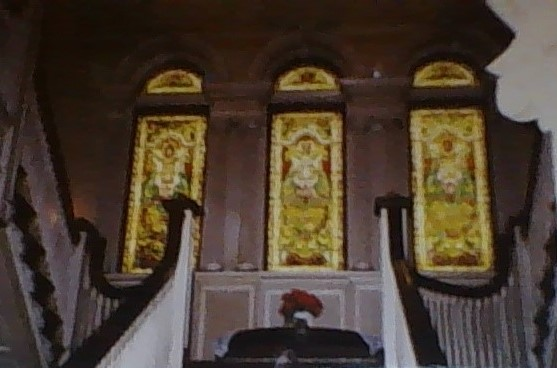
Stained glass windows at the top of the main staircase

The New York City interior design firm, Pottier & Stymus designed the interior decorations. Townsend & Fleming landscape firm from Buffalo was hired to do the grounds. Titchener Iron works designed and manufactured the wrought iron fence surrounding the grounds. Estimated cost for the entire project was $107,500.

It is said to be very similar to the McKinnon House in Utica, built in 1899, which Vosbury also designed.

The mansion is supposedly haunted by the ghost of its former owner, Alonzo Roberson. His spirit is believed to still roam around and apparitions have been seen in the elevator and along the upper corridors.

It was listed on the National Register of Historic Places in 1980.
