= Dan Wynn =

American photographer (1920–1995)

Dan Wynn (1920–1995) was an American editorial, portrait, and advertising photographer and film director. During his career, his work was published in many American magazines, including Esquire, New York, Travel + Leisure, Seventeen, Time, Newsweek, Harper's Bazaar, McCall's and Woman's Day. He also provided covers for books, record albums, and international magazines (sometimes with himself as his model).

== Life and work ==
Born in Chicago in 1920, his family moved to Los Angeles when he was twelve. He attended the Chouinard Art Institute alternating his education at the University of California. Serving in the US Army Air Force during World War II, Wynn learned how to take pictures and run a photo lab and, back in Los Angeles after the war, he attended the Art Center School: while still a student, there he won the Condé Nast Photo Contest.

Wynn moved to New York in 1947 and got his editorial start at Seventeen, where he quickly became successful shooting fashion. He went on to shoot major accounts for top advertising agencies including Revlon (with Kay Daly) and memorable campaigns for clients as diverse as International Paper, Van Raalte and Maidenform (the famous "I dreamed I was ... in my Maidenform bra" ), and Ford cars, while continuing his photojournalist work covering events such as Le Mans auto racing .

Wynn's portraiture and photo essays included entertainers (Jimmy Durante, Dolly Parton), artists (Salvador Dalí) musicians (Duke Ellington, Luciano Pavarotti, Louis Armstrong), television personalities (Carol Burnett, Sid Caesar), movie stars (Robert De Niro, Katharine Hepburn, Dustin Hoffman, Al Pacino), film directors, (Alfred Hitchcock, Billy Wilder, Frank Capra, François Truffaut), fashion models (Suzy Parker and Jane Fonda in the early days of her career) and such national figures as president and Mrs. Lyndon Johnson, Rose Kennedy, Norman Mailer, Gloria Steinem and the very young Bill Gates (for a Newsweek cover). With Malcolm Forbes, Wynn traveled the world photographing their trip in Forbes' private plane.

Wynn was a long-standing member of ASMP (American Society of Media Photographers). His photography was recognized with numerous awards from the New York Art Directors Club, Communication Arts and the American Institute of Graphic Arts, and in 1976 his photographs were included in The Family of Man photography exhibit at the Philadelphia Museum of Art.

Dan Wynn's photography has been acquired by the National Portrait Gallery for their permanent collection and has been seen in New York City at the Bonni BenRubi Gallery among others, and the Museum at the Fashion Institute of Technology. Wynn's editorial spreads of beautiful people and places in international cities, pubs, vineyards, and restaurants brought him into contact with food writer James Beard. He first photographed Beard in 1963, and remained Beard's semi-official photographer until the latter's death, providing photographs for book covers, Beard's various articles, recipes and food columns. In the process, he became one of America's most renowned food photographers.

Dan Wynn died in 1995 at age 75. Peter Kump, the founder of the James Beard Foundation, dedicated an obituary to Wynn in the foundation's newsletter in April 1995, and pledged his commitment to keeping Wynn's photography as a part of the foundation's heritage.
