= Roberta Griffith =

American artist (born 1937)

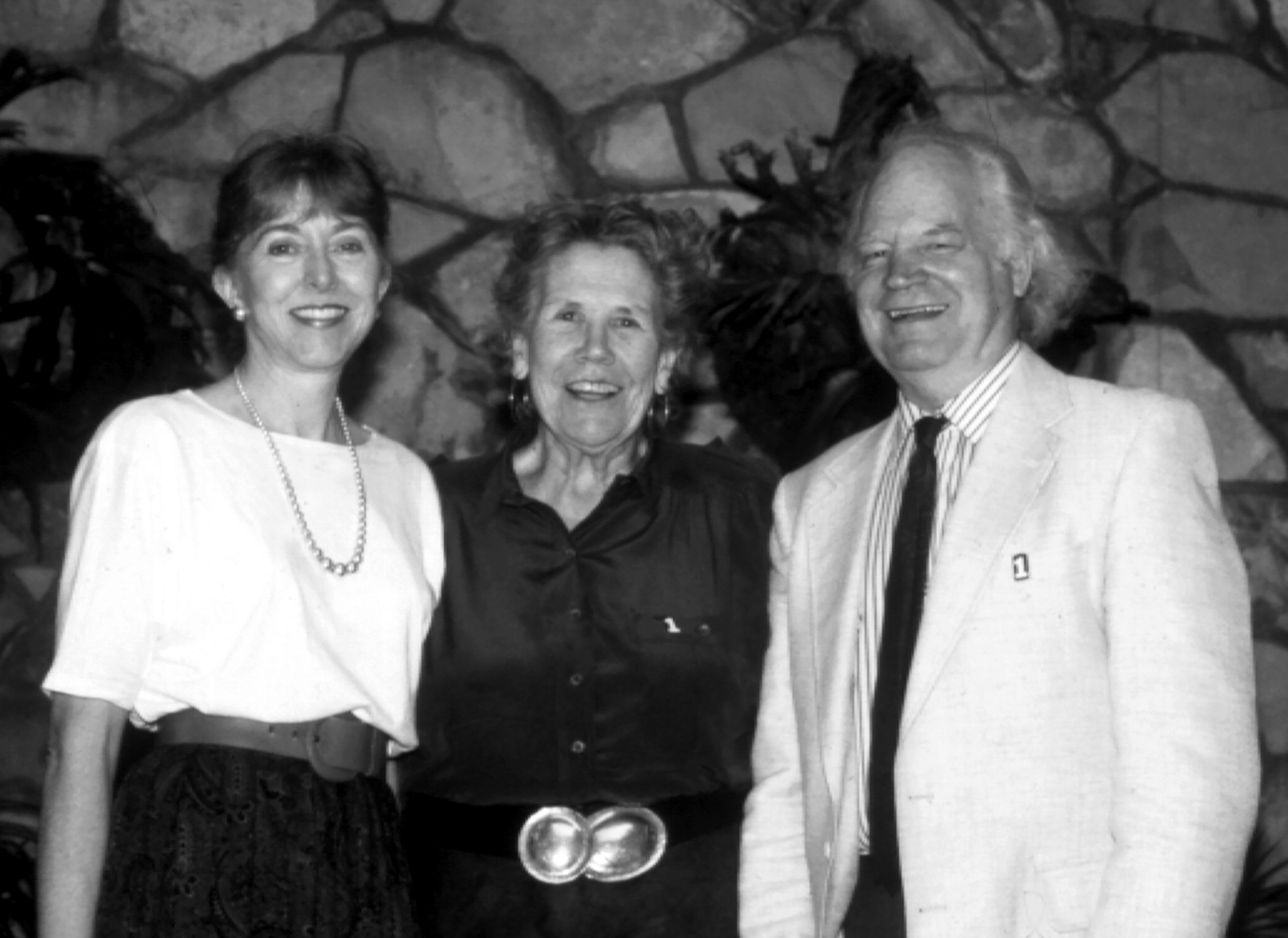
- Roberta Griffith (left), with Vivika and Otto Heino (1989)
- Born: Roberta Jean Griffith; 1937 (age 88–89); Hillsdale, Michigan, U.S.
- Education: University of Michigan, Chouinard Art Institute, Southern Illinois University
- Occupations: artist, professor
- Employer: Hartwick College (1966–2008)

Roberta Jean Griffith (born 1937) is an American contemporary artist working in ceramics, painting, drawing, and glass. She is Professor Emerita of Art at Hartwick College in Oneonta, New York; where she taught art from 1966 until 2008. She resides in Hawaii and New York state.

== Early life and education ==
Born in Hillsdale, Michigan in 1937, Griffith began drawing and painting in early childhood, winning a competition for a self-portrait when she was ten years old. Her mother and father, a psychologist and steel vendor respectively, supported her interest in art from a young age. Griffith studied drawing and painting at the University of Michigan, withdrawing after two years. She later earned a BFA from the Chouinard Art Institute in Los Angeles, CA in 1960 and an MFA degree from Southern Illinois University in Carbondale, IL in 1962.

== Work ==
Griffith’s work combines materials into mixed media installations to tell stories. Griffith has stated that she seeks “to evoke associations of places and their cultural manifestations that [she has] come across through research and world travel, as well as allude to human foibles, human mortality, the cyclical nature of life and death, and universal natural or man-made shortcomings."

== Exhibitions ==
The first solo show of Griffith's paintings was at the Aspen Gallery in Aspen, Colorado in 1958. Individual exhibitions of her work have appeared at the Yager Museum at Hartwick College in Oneonta, NY (1967, 1969, 1994, 2003) 2 Rivers Gallery at the Roberson Museum and Science Center in Binghamton NY (1977), Lycoming College Art Gallery in Williamsport, PA (1981), John Grosvenor Gallery at the State University of New York at Cobleskill (1982), Center Galleries in Albany, NY (1984, 2001), The Art Center Gallery at Endicott College in Beverly, MA (1985), and Winifisky Gallery at Salem State College in Salem, MA (1992). Griffith has had solo exhibitions at the Kauai Museum in Lihu’e (2010) and the Honolulu Museum of Art in Honolulu (2017). She has had individual exhibitions at Spanish institutions including the Celler D’en Climent in Gerona (1963), L’Escola Massana in Barcelona (1964), Ateneo de Madrid in Madrid (1964), Camarote Granados Gallery in Barcelona (1974), and the Museu de Ceramica in Barcelona, Spain (1999).

== Collections ==
Griffith’s work has been collected by public institutions in the United States, including The American Museum of Ceramic Art in Pomona, CA and Honolulu Museum of Art, where she was a featured artist in Artists of Hawai’i 2013; the Everson Museum of Art in Syracuse, NY; the Daum Museum of Contemporary Art in Sedalia, MO, and the Roberson Museum and Science Center in Binghamton, NY. Griffith’s work is also housed in international collections, including the Museu de Ceramica, Barcelona, Spain; CLAY Keramikmuseum in Grimmerhus, Denmark; the Yingge Ceramics Museum in New Taipei City, Taiwan; and the Yixing Ceramics Museum in Yixing, China.

== Grants and awards ==
Griffith received a Fulbright Grant to study art in Spain between 1962 and 1964 and a National Endowment for the Humanities summer institute grant in 1991. She received the National Society of Daughters of the American Revolution’s American Heritage Award for Women in the Arts in 2018.

== Literature ==
Roberta Griffith (2003) was published in collaboration with the artist to accompany a retrospective exhibition at the Yager Museum. Griffith is the North American correspondent for Revista Ceramica (Madrid, Spain) and a regular contributor.
