= Michele Martin =

Michel, Michelle or Michele Martin may refer to:

- Michele Francisca Martin (born 1946), American fine art painter, a/k/a Michele Martin Taylor
- Michel Martin, American journalist and correspondent for NPR and WNET since 1980s
- Michelle Martin (born 1967), Australian world champion squash player
- Michelle Martin Dutroux, wife (1989–2003) and accomplice of Belgian serial killer Marc Dutroux
