= Alice Beasley =

American quilter (born 1945)

- Born: 1945 (age 80–81); Tuskegee, Alabama, U.S.
- Education: Marygrove College (BA); University of California, Berkeley (JD)
- Occupations: Quilter, textile artist, journalist, civil rights attorney
- Known for: Quilting
- Website: www.alicebeasley.com

Alice Beasley (born 1945) is an African-American quilter and textile artist, and a former journalist and civil rights attorney.

== Early life and education ==
Alice Beasley was born in 1945, in Tuskegee, Alabama. Her family moved to Michigan when she was four years old; she grew up in Detroit.

Beasley attended Marygrove College in Detroit, earning a bachelor's degree in journalism in 1962. She worked for The Detroit News as an entertainment reporter. She later moved to the San Francisco Bay Area where she worked at the San Francisco Chronicle for approximately one year as a features reporter. Beasley attended University of California, Berkeley, earning her J.D. degree, with a specialty in civil rights litigation and constitutional law, in 1973.

== Career ==
Beasley started her own law firm with two friends after graduating from Berkeley. During her law career, she worked for the NAACP legal defense fund.

She began making art as a respite from her day job as an attorney. As she was "facile with fabric and also liked to draw," she wondered if she could create portraits with fabric. She started quilting in 1988, her inspirations ranging from Modigliani, Vermeer, and Rembrandt to Chuck Close and Hung Liu. She began her career as a full-time quilt artist after her retirement from the legal profession in January 2007.

She has had her work displayed at the Joyce Gordon Gallery, Berkeley Art Center, Myrtle Beach Art Museum, the American Folk Art Museum, the Smithsonian Anacostia Museum, The Textile Museum in Washington D.C., Los Medanos College, the Clinton Presidential Center, the Quilt National, the California Heritage Museum, Rutgers University Art Museum, the Featherstone Center for the Arts in Massachusetts, and abroad in Spain, France, Japan, Namibia, and Croatia.

The De Young Museum in San Francisco holds her work in their collection, as does the San Francisco Arts Commission and the County of Alameda. One of her works, A Meditation on Time, is in the permanent collection of the United States Embassy in Chad. She has done commissions for the Richmond California Housing Authority, Stanford University, and the Highland Hospital in Oakland.

She is a Juried Artist Member at the Studio Art Quilt Associates, and a member of the African American Quilt Guild of Oakland.

Beasley is known for her appliqué quilts, which she creates using commercial and hand-printed fabrics. Much of her work contains social or political commentary. Some of her work is not intended to be explicitly political in nature, but has been described as "highly politicized". On the topic of one of her portraits which depicts a young Black man, Beasley once said, “Frankly, anytime you are showing the humanity of a Black man these days, you are necessarily entering into a narrative that requires a movement just to expound the simple proposition that Black lives matter.”

Some of her artworks depict or commemorate historical figures, including Miles Davis, Thelton Henderson, Martin Luther King Jr., Trayvon Martin, Barack Obama, Betty Reid Soskin, and Ida B. Wells. Other artworks reference historical events and movements, like Shelby County v. Holder, the Rwandan Civil War, and the African-American women's suffrage movement, as well as subjects in contemporary politics, such as the National Rifle Association of America, anti-Black racism, Black life in the United States, climate change, pollution, the impact of social media, and essential workers during the COVID-19 pandemic. One example of Beasley's commentary pieces is From Russia With Love (2017), which depicts Vladimir Putin and Donald Trump as the two embracing figures from The Kiss by Gustav Klimt. She has also created still lifes, landscapes, works about her family history, and portraits from her imagination.

== Personal life ==
Beasley was married to Dave Cohn from 2007 until his death in 2016. She lives in Piedmont, California, near Oakland.

== See also ==
- African-American art
- Black Lives Matter art
- Quilts of Gee's Bend
- Souls Grown Deep Foundation
