= Guy Dill =

American sculptor

Guy Girard Dill (born May 30, 1946, in Jacksonville, Florida) is an American sculptor noted for monumental bronze and marble abstractions. He is the younger brother of painter Laddie John Dill (born 1943). Guy Dill lives in Los Angeles, California.

== Early life and education ==
Dill grew up in Malibu, California, in "a colony of blacklisted writers." His mother was a portrait painter, who "always surrounded us with her friends who were writers, producers and actors."

From 1963 to 1967, Dill served in the United States Coast Guard. As he later recalled, "Vietnam was in full swing and the Coast Guard was my opportunity not to go into combat." Looking past the Coast Guard, he planned to continue as a sailor. "I'd gotten my captain's papers, and my plan was to start a company of charter schooners."

But in 1966, while still in the Coast Guard, he "started going to Chouinard ...to go to visit my brother there...It was life drawing class at night and I loved the environment. I loved the smell of oil paint and turpentine, and there was something very earthy about all of it, and there was always a live model there. And after coming in from being at sea for thirty days and driving into downtown Los Angeles the highlight was always to go in and visit my brother in class. After the second time the instructor said, 'Well, if you're going to come in, then you better bring a drawing pad.'" Dill ultimately enrolled at Chouinard and received a BFA with Honors in 1970.

In a 1972 interview with Art and Artists, Dill reflected that his years as a sailor and "the deck gear and the size and power of the sailing ships" influenced his interest in sculpture and the subject of his work.

== Venice studio ==
Dill put down roots in the Venice neighborhood of Los Angeles, "then a hippie enclave with lots of cheap, available real estate—a perfect place for free-spirited artists to cut their collective teeth...'There was a new crop of young artists known as the Venice Mafia,' says Dill. 'We were young, we were doing original work. There was a sense that something important was happening. It was exciting.'"

"The '70s were great," Dill recalled. "At one point all of us would hang out on the beach and then go back to our studios. We'd inevitably see each other at night. We were all good friends, and yet we had no collective identity—we were all individual artists."

Dill came to own a 12,500 square foot studio in Venice "just a couple of blocks from the beach," consisting of "two lofty steel framed sheds...'Most artists in this area were building at some point,' he says. 'We didn't think of it as architecture, just something to keep out the cold, add a bathroom or a place to cook. Frank [Gehry] learned from artists adding gutting, and exposing the structure, rather than going through a long, agonizing process of ground-up design and construction.' In the early 1970s, Guy joined his brother in New York, but found it too constricting, and returned to his studio and his well-loved Mustang."

== Career ==
It was art dealer Irving Blum, the gallerist who introduced Andy Warhol's work to the West Coast at the Ferus Gallery in Los Angeles, who discovered Dill, giving him a coveted spot in a group show. Another big break was his inclusion in the show Ten Young Artists: Theodoron Awards at the Solomon R. Guggenheim Museum in New York in 1971.

In his initial years as a sculptor,

Dill spent a long time...developing a feel for materials before he went on to experiment with glass, aluminium, steel, wood and concrete. He charts a progression in his work where he moved from lighter to heavier objects and back again: cardboard to timber; string to rope and cable. Dill was also interested in what he saw as the intrinsic energy of material and objects and in the tension, reliance and separateness of these objects and materials: in juxtaposing sheet steel with cable and wood, for example, and in the dependence or independence of his sculptures from the spaces in which they are displayed.

Dill's sculptures can be seen in scores of public and corporate spaces, the greatest number in Southern California, but also as far afield as Stockholm, Tokyo, and Doha. His public sculptures in the Greater Los Angeles area include Espejos Abstractos (1987), From the Belgian Suite (1999), and Pablo at the Beach (2013) in Beverly Hills, Harmic Arch (1989) in Venice, and Echo Echo (1996) in Culver City.

His work is in the collections of numerous museums including the Smithsonian American Art Museum, the Solomon R. Guggenheim Museum, the Museum of Modern Art, LACMA, the Norton Simon Museum, the de Young Museum, and the Stedelijk Museum.

== Positions and awards ==
Dill has served as Head of the Sculpture Department, UCLA (1978-82); on the Artists Advisory Council of the Museum of Contemporary Art, Los Angeles (1981-82); on the Advisory Council for the Arts, Cedars-Sinai Medical Center, Los Angeles (from 1985, ongoing), as the Harman Eisner Artist in Residence, Aspen Institute (2010); on the Board of Trustees of the International Sculpture Center (2015); and on the Advisory Board of the California Heritage Museum in Santa Monica, California (from 2012, ongoing).

Awards received by Dill in the course of his career include the Theodoron Award from the Solomon R. Guggenheim Museum in 1971; first prize in the American Show of the Art Institute of Chicago, 1974; two fellowships from the National Endowment for the Arts, in 1974 and 1981; and in 2000, the Stars of Design Lifetime Achievement for Art Award from the Pacific Design Center in West Hollywood, California.

== Personal life ==
Although Dill and his brother both became artists, Dill says there was never any sibling rivalry between them.

I had no competition with Laddie. I always loved him. We were great friends growing up. We had no father figure in our life, so growing up with my mother it was a very close family, my sister, my brother and I. And we're still close. And other people have put competition in our way...like an Orange County newspaper where this guy was actually trying to make up these stories where we were in competition, there was sibling rivalry. We undid him, we undid the guy, the sonofabitch. I mean...it just is so unfair to try to do that to people who love each other that much...[Laddie] did what he did, and I do what I do, and it's coincidental that we're both artists. But we've shared studios, we've been in the same exhibitions together.

Regarding his wife of many years, Mary Ann, Dill told an interviewer,

One thing that happened early in our marriage is that I was able to draw her figure but never was I able to successfully include her face....I think I have such esteem for her that I can't do her justice. Maybe I just can't do her justice because she's one of the finest people I'll ever know and she's certainly one of the most different from me that I'll ever know. I'm attracted to my opposites in women—[she's] Sagittarius, I'm Gemini.

== Bibliography ==
- California Sculpture Show, catalogue of international touring exhibition (California, France, W. Germany, England, Norway), Los Angeles: California/International Arts Foundation, 1984.
- Contemporary American Painting and Sculpture, Fifteenth Exhibition, catalogue of exhibition at the Krannert Art Museum, March 10—April 21, 1974, Urbana: University of Illinois Press, 1974.
- Frank, Peter. Guy Dill: Bronze, Marble, Works on Paper, exhibition catalogue, Bobbie Greenfield Gallery, 2005.
- Guy Dill, A Decade, exhibition catalogue, Katzen American University Museum, College of Arts & Sciences, 2006.
- Ten Young Artists: Theodoron Awards, unpaginated catalog of an exhibition held September 24-November 7, 1971, at the Solomon R. Guggenheim Museum, New York.
- Webb, Michael. Venice, CA: Art and Architecture in a Maverick Community, Harry N. Abrams, 2007.
