= Dylan Mattingly =

American composer and musician

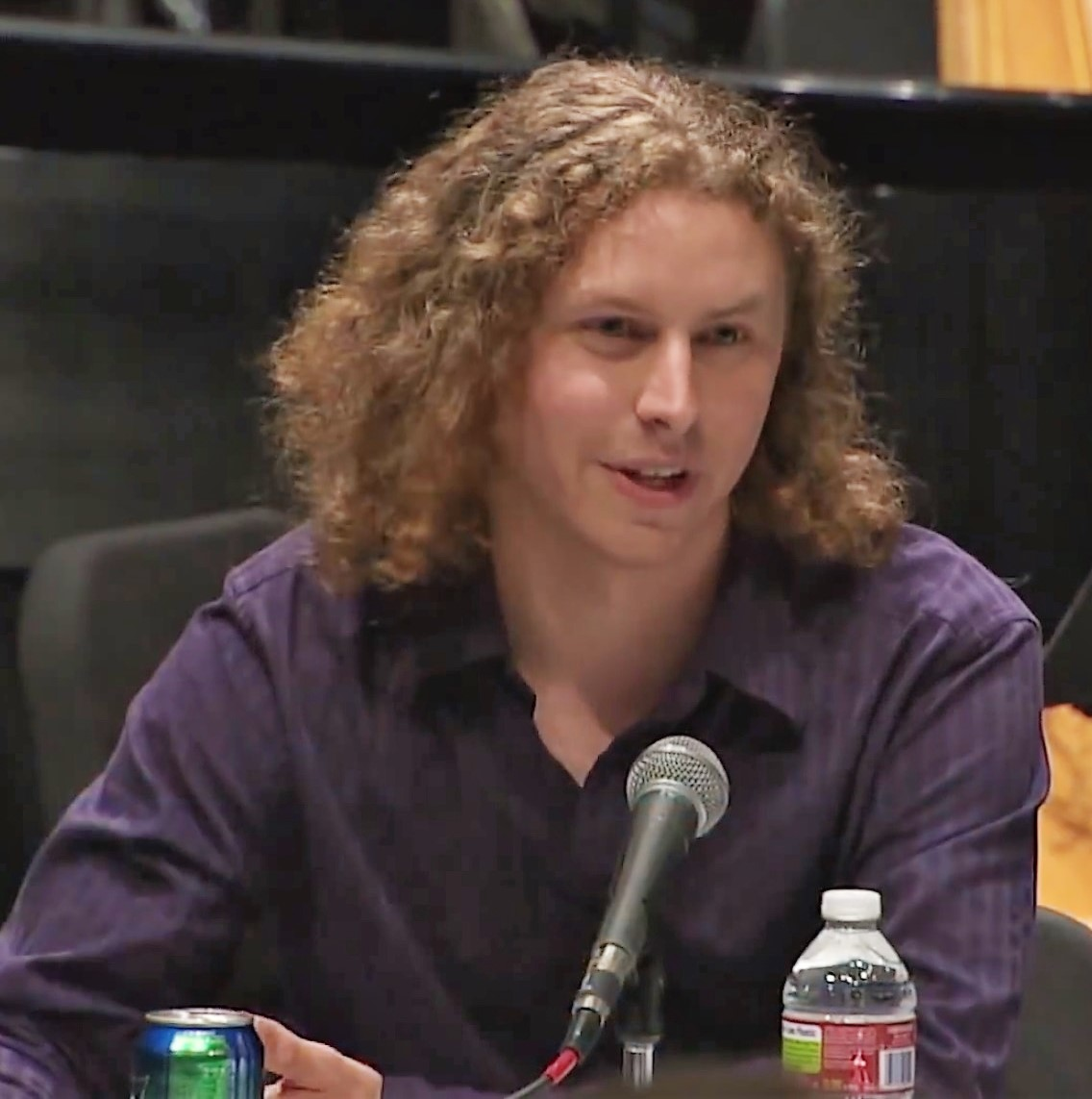
- Mattingly at the 2012 Cabrillo Festival of Contemporary Music

Background information
- Born: March 18, 1991 (age 35); Oakland, California, United States
- Genres: post-minimalism, post-rock, contemporary classical
- Occupation: Composer
- Instruments: cello, guitar, bass, piano, voice
- Website: www.dylanmattingly.com

Dylan Mattingly (born March 18, 1991) is an American composer from Berkeley, California.

== Early life ==
Mattingly was born on March 18, 1991, in Oakland, California. He is a member of the Los Angeles-based musical family of the Allers/Altschulers, which includes Modest Altschuler, Eleanor Aller, Leonard Slatkin, and Judith Aller, among others. His grandmother was the painter Gladys Aller. His father is the poet George Mattingly.

Mattingly holds a BA in Classics and a BM in Music Composition from Bard College & Conservatory of Music, where he studied with George Tsontakis, Joan Tower, John Halle and Kyle Gann. He holds an MM in Music from the Yale School of Music where he studied with Martin Bresnick, Christopher Theofanidis, and David Lang.

== Career ==
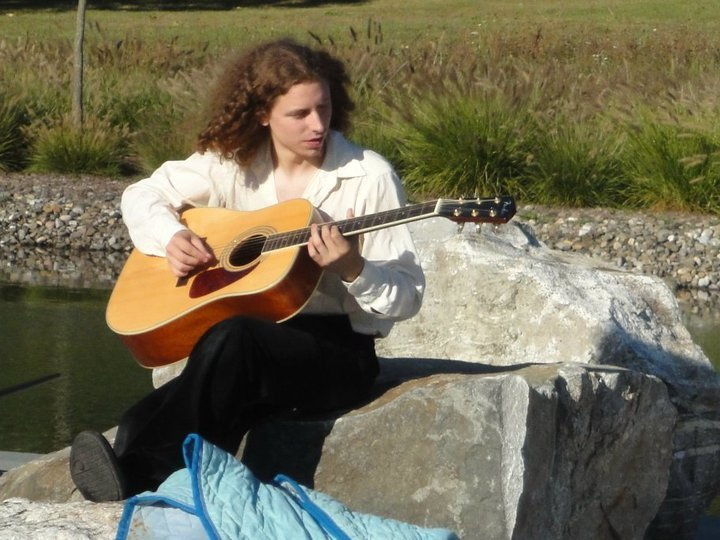
Mattingly at Bard College in 2011

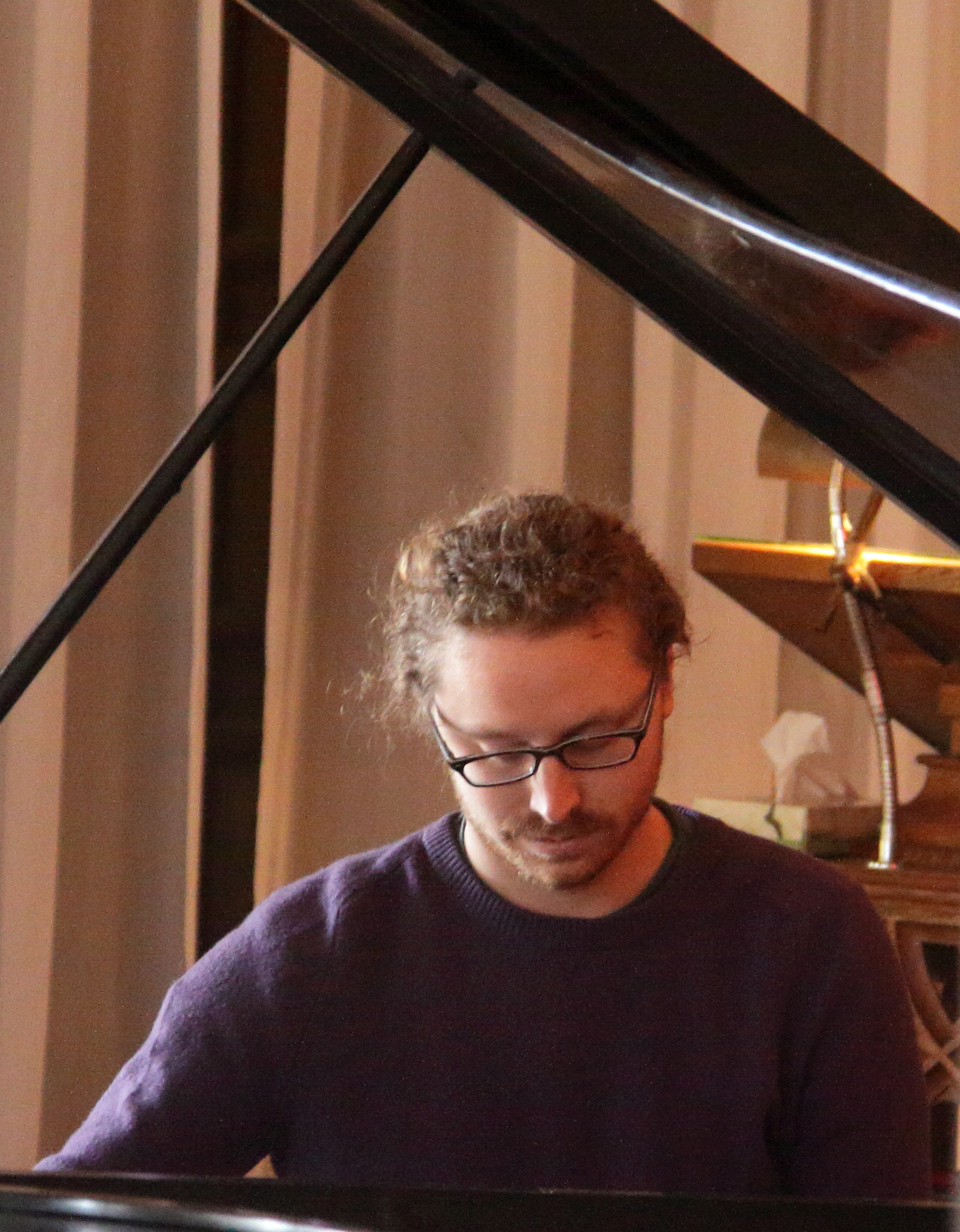
Dylan Mattingly playing piano at the Chapel of the Chimes during the Pauline Oliveros memorial, 2016.

Mattingly was the co-director of Formerly Known as Classical in San Francisco for two years—a youth-run new music organization which played only music written within their lifetimes, and is currently the co-artistic director and cellist of Contemporaneous, a new music ensemble based in New York “dedicated to performing the most exciting music of this generation.” Contemporaneous has released an album on INNOVA Records, entitled Stream of Stars—Music of Dylan Mattingly.

Various performance groups have featured Mattingly's work, including the Los Angeles Philharmonic, Cabrillo Festival Orchestra, and the Berkeley Symphony. Several solo artists and small ensembles have performed his work as well, including Soovin Kim, Ignat Solzhenitsyn, Sarah Cahill, Geoffrey Burleson, Mary Rowell, Other Minds, Symphony Parnassus, the Da Capo Chamber Players, and the Del Sol String Quartet.

Mattingly has received commissions from the Los Angeles Philharmonic Orchestra, the Albany Symphony Orchestra, the Ojai Music Festival, Zofo Duet, & the Norfolk Chamber Music Festival (2016); pianists Sarah Cahill & Kathleen Supove (2015); Cabrillo Festival of Contemporary Music & Contemporaneous (2014); The Berkeley Symphony, Del Sol Quartet, John Coolidge Adams and Deborah O’Grady for the Cabrillo Festival Orchestra (2012).

Stranger Love, a six hour opera for 28 musicians, 8 singers, and 6 dancers, written together with a writer Thomas Bartscherer, premiered in May, 2023 at Walt Disney Concert Hall. It was directed by Lileana Blain-Cruz, conducted by David Bloom and performed by Contemporaneous ensemble.

== Works ==
- Stranger Love, together with Thomas Bartscherer, premiered May, 2023. Six hour opera for 28 musicians, 8 singers, and 6 dancers.
- Sunt Lacrimae Rerum (these are the tears of things), co-commissioned by the Los Angeles Philharmonic and the Ojai Music Festival, premiered September 19, 2021. For two harps and two retuned pianos.
- Gravity and Grace, commissioned by the Los Angeles Philharmonic, for organ and two retuned pianos. Premiered June 1, 2019.
- Goodbye Sonnet, for high voice, electric guitar, and vibraphone, premiered September 2019.
- La Vita Nuova (and other consequences of Spring), commissioned by Colin Davin and Emily Levin, premiered June, 2017, for guitar and harp, 15'
- After The Rain, commissioned by F-Plus, premiered January 6, 2017. for clarinet, vibraphone, and violin, 8'
- Ecstasy, commissioned by the Norfolk Chamber Music Festival, premiered August, 2016, for SATB Choir, oboe, clarinet, trumpet, vibraphone, piano, 2 violins, viola, cello, bass, 8'
- Delphinium, commissioned by the Albany Symphony, premiered in June, 2016, for soprano, flute, oboe, clarinet, vibraphone, harp, violin, viola, cello, bass, 6'
- Magnolia, commissioned by ZOFO, premiered May 10, 2016, for piano four hands, 6'
- Achilles Dreams of Ebbets Field, commissioned by Kathleen Supové, premiered November 21, 2015 at the DiMenna Center, New York, NY, for solo piano, 105'
- Seasickness and Being (in love), commissioned by the Los Angeles Philharmonic, premiered May 26, 2015 at Disney Hall, Los Angeles, CA, for chamber orchestra, 15'
- Y E A R, commissioned by Sarah Cahill and the Ross McKee Foundation in honor of Terry Riley's 80th birthday, January 29, 2015, for solo piano, 15'
- Sky Madrigal, commissioned by the Cabrillo Festival of Contemporary Music, August 2014, for orchestra, 15'
- The Bakkhai, commissioned by Contemporaneous and the Bard College Classics Program, December 2013, for 3 sopranos, tenor, 2 oboes, cello, bass, re-tuned piano, 2 percussion, 30'
- Gone, Gone, Gone, commissioned by the Del Sol Quartet, December 2012, for string quartet, 15'
- Invisible Skyline, commissioned by the Berkeley Symphony, December 2012, for orchestra, 30'
- I Was a Stranger, commissioned by John Adams and Deborah O'Grady for the Cabrillo Festival of Contemporary Music, August 2012, for orchestra, 10'
- Atlas of Somewhere on the Way to Howland Island, commissioned by Contemporaneous, September 2011, for chamber orchestra, 36'
- A Way A Lone A Last A Loved A Long the Riverrun, commissioned by Contemporaneous, May 2010, for bassoon, violin, cello, bass, percussion, 15'
- Lighthouse (Refugee Music by a Pacific Expatriate), commissioned by Contemporaneous, March 2010, for amplified string quintet, 12'
- Nobody, Not Even the Rain, Has Such Small Hands, for the Da Capo Players, December 2009, for flute, clarinet, violin, cello, piano, 9'
- Dreams and False Alarms, August 2009, for two pianos, one tuned down a quarter-tone, 20'
