= Laddie John Dill =

American artist

Laddie John Dill (born Long Beach, CA, 1943) is an American artist. Dill calls his work "light sentences". Dill received a BFA degree from Chouinard Art Institute, Los Angeles, in 1968. He is the older brother of sculptor Guy Dill.

== Education ==
Dill was educated at the Chouinard Art Institute in California, where he graduated with a BFA degree with honors in 1968. After he graduated, he worked as a printing apprentice to Robert Rauschenberg, Jasper Johns, Roy Lichtenstein. and Claes Oldenberg.

== Work ==
Dill is associated with the California "Light and Space Movement". His work has been widely exhibited in museums and galleries, including those in New York, Paris, Seoul and other locations nationally and internationally. His first solo exhibition took place in 1971 at the Sonnabend Gallery. Dill is known for his glass, sand and light slab paintings from the 1960s and 1970s. He also produced, starting in the 1970s, works with luminescent tubes charged with neon, mercury and argon gasses. He has described these works as "light sentences," referring to language, and as "light plains".

== Awards and honors ==
Dill has received two grants from the National Endowment for the Arts, a Guggenheim fellowship, and a grant from the Pollock-Krasner Foundation.

== Collections ==
Dill's work is held in the permanent collections of the Laguna Art Museum, the Santa Barbara Museum of Art, MOCA Los Angeles, the Smithsonian American Art Museum, among others.
