= Chouinard Art Institute =

Former art school in Los Angeles, California

The Chouinard Art Institute was a private art school in the Westlake neighborhood of Los Angeles, California, United States. It was founded in 1921 by Nelbert Murphy Chouinard. In 1961, Walt and Roy Disney guided the merger of the Chouinard Art Institute and the Los Angeles Conservatory of Music to establish the California Institute of the Arts. Chouinard continued to operate until the new campus opened in 1970.

== History ==
Founded by artist and educator Nelbert Murphy Chouinard in 1921 with the goal of creating a renowned art school on the West Coast, the school grew during the subsequent decades and in 1935 it was recognized by the California state government as a non-profit educational facility. In 1929, Walt Disney began driving his inexperienced animators to the school for Friday night classes, a tradition that would continue for many years. Several years later Disney hired a Chouinard teacher named Donald Graham to teach more formal classes on studio property. Chouinard would later be used by Disney as a breeding ground for artists for Snow White and the Seven Dwarfs. In the early 1950s Mrs. Chouinard had a stroke and could not run the school; in gratitude for letting his animators study there, Walt Disney supported the school financially and took over administrative duties. He also attempted to expand the school into what he called a "City of the Arts". This eventually led to the merger of Chouinard and Los Angeles Conservatory of Music into the California Institute of the Arts in 1961. Chouinard officially closed when its successor began operations in 1970.

== Legacy ==
The Chouinard Art Institute building is situated at 743 Grand View Street in the Westlake district of central Los Angeles. Today it is used by the Western Day Care School, a child-care center.

Dave Tourjé, who became fascinated by the institute's history after buying and restoring Nelbert Chouinard's 1907 home in South Pasadena, California, helped to establish the Chouinard Foundation, which produced a 2001 retrospective exhibition and gave art classes, first in its own building and then under contract with the City of Los Angeles Department of Recreation and Parks. Since 2009, when funding for the art classes ran out, Tourje has focused on keeping the Chouinard name alive, including a Chouinard Foundation website with archival material.

Produced and directed by Gianina Ferreyra in 2013, the 51-minute documentary film Curly addresses the school's history from 1921 to 1972, including interviews with artists Larry Bell, Laddie John Dill, Llyn Foulkes, Joe Goode, Ed Ruscha, and Peter Shire, among others.

== Notable alumni ==
- Manuel Gregorio Acosta (1921–1989), painter and illustrator
- Terry Allen, singer and painter
- Gladys Aller (1915–1970), painter
- John Altoon (1925–1969), painter
- Pete Alvarado (1920–2003), animator and comic book artist
- Robert Alvarez, animator
- Charles Arnoldi, painter, sculptor, and printmaker
- Norio Azuma (1928-2004), painter and abstract serigraph artist
- Ralph Bacerra (1938–2008), ceramist
- Don Bachardy, portrait artist
- Elaine Badgley Arnoux (1926–2023), portrait artist
- Milo Baughman (1923–2003), modern furniture designer
- Larry Bell, artist and sculptor
- Ted Berman (1919–2001), animator
- Ed Benedict (1912–2006), animator, designer
- Marjorie Best (1903–1997), costume designer
- Mary Blair (1911–1978), painter, animator
- Preston Blair (1908–1995), animator
- Robert Blue (1946–1998), pin-up artist
- Harry Bowden (1907–1965), painter
- Michael Bowen (1937–2009), painting, performance art
- Cory Buckner, architect
- Timothy J. Clark, painter
- Mary Corse, painter associated with the Light and Space movement
- Richard Cromwell (1910–1960), actor
- Alice Estes Davis, costume designer
- Ernest de Soto (1923–2014), master lithographer
- John DeCuir (1918–1991), art director
- Guy Dill, sculptor
- Donfeld (1934–2007), costume designer
- Boyd Elder (1944–2018) Experimental & album cover artist
- Jules Engel (1909–2003), animator and painter
- Jim Evans, graphic designer, illustrator, painter
- Lilly Fenichel (1927–2016), painter
- Sandra Fisher (1947–1994), painter
- Llyn Foulkes, painter
- Gyo Fujikawa (1908–1998), children's book author and illustrator
- Hisao "Hy" Fujita (1937-), graphic designer, illustrator, photographer
- S. Neil Fujita (1921–2010), graphic designer.
- A.C. Gamer (1899-1964), effects animator
- Bob Givens (1918–2017), animator
- Harper Goff (1911–1993), artist and art director
- Jack Goldstein (1945–2003), painter
- Joe Goode, painter
- Rick Griffin (1944–1991), artist and cartoonist
- Roberta Griffith, painter and ceramist
- Frederick Hammersley (1919–2009), painter
- Laverne Harding (1905–1984), animator
- Edith Head (1897–1981), costume designer
- Larry Huber, animator
- Arnold Hylen (1907-1983), graphic designer, illustrator, photographer, writer
- Robert Irwin, installation artist
- Willie Ito, animator
- Elois Jenssen (1922–2004), costume designer
- Ollie Johnston (1912–2008), animator, one of Disney's Nine Old Men
- Chuck Jones (1912–2002), animator of Looney Tunes and Merrie Melodies
- Corita Kent (1918–1986), artist
- Bob Kurtz, animator
- Abe Levitow (1922–1975), animator
- John J. Lloyd (1922–2014), art director and production designer
- Bud Luckey (1934–2018), animator
- Bob Mackie, fashion and costume designer
- Mara McAfee (1929–1984), painter and illustrator
- John McGrew (1910-1999), animator
- Bill Melendez (1916–2008), animator
- Peter Menefee, costume- and stage-designer
- Reid Miles (1927–1993), graphic designer and photographer
- Ron Miyashiro, painter, jewelry maker, and assemblage artist
- Jimmy T. Murakami (1933–2014), animator
- Patrick Nagel (1945–1984), artist
- Maurice Noble (1911–2001), background artist
- Milicent Patrick (1915–1998), artist, actress, and animator
- Virgil Partch (1916–1984), cartoonist
- Walter Peregoy (1925–2015), artist
- Danny Pierce (1920–2014), painter, printmaker and sculptor
- Sally Pierone (1921–2018), artist
- Noah Purifoy (1917–2004), sculptor
- Milton Quon (1913–2019), animator
- Elsa Rady (1943–2011), ceramist
- Wolfgang Reitherman (1909–1985), animator, one of Disney's Nine Old Men
- Allen Ruppersberg, artist
- Edward Ruscha, painter
- Herbert Ryman (1910–1989), artist and Disney imagineer
- Retta Scott (1916–1990), Disney's first female animator
- Rod Scribner (1910–1976), animator
- Millard Sheets (1907–1989), painter
- Peter Shire, sculptor, furniture designer, and ceramist
- Ken Shutt (1928–2010), American sculptor
- William E. Smith (artist) (1913-1997), printmaker, instructor, sign designer
- Dan Spiegle (1920–2017), comic book artist
- Buck Taylor (1938-), painter and actor
- Michele Martin Taylor, painter
- Frank Thomas (1912–2004), animator, one of Disney's Nine Old Men
- Morton Traylor (1918–1996), fine artist, designer, and serigrapher
- John Van Hamersveld, graphic artist and illustrator
- Roy Williams (1907–1976), Disney animator and gagman
- Dan Wynn (1920–1995), photographer
- Jack Zander (1908–2007), animator

== Nelbert Chouinard Award winners ==
This award is given by a Chouinard peer committee to alumni or individuals associated with Chouinard Art Institute who have embodied the spirit of Nelbert Chouinard as artists and by contributions to their community. Awardees must have elevated the profile of their particular art form, broken through ceilings or set industry trends to be considered. In addition, the committee reviews each nominees past leadership roles, exhibition(s), award(s), publication(s) and if they have given back to their community philanthropically, as a teacher or as a volunteer.

- Alice Estes Davis '50, costume designer
- Don Bachardy '60, 2016, portrait artist
- Leo Monahan '58, 2018, paper sculptor
- Larry Bell '59, 2019, artist and sculptor
