= Slip (clothing) =

Woman's undergarment worn beneath a dress or skirt

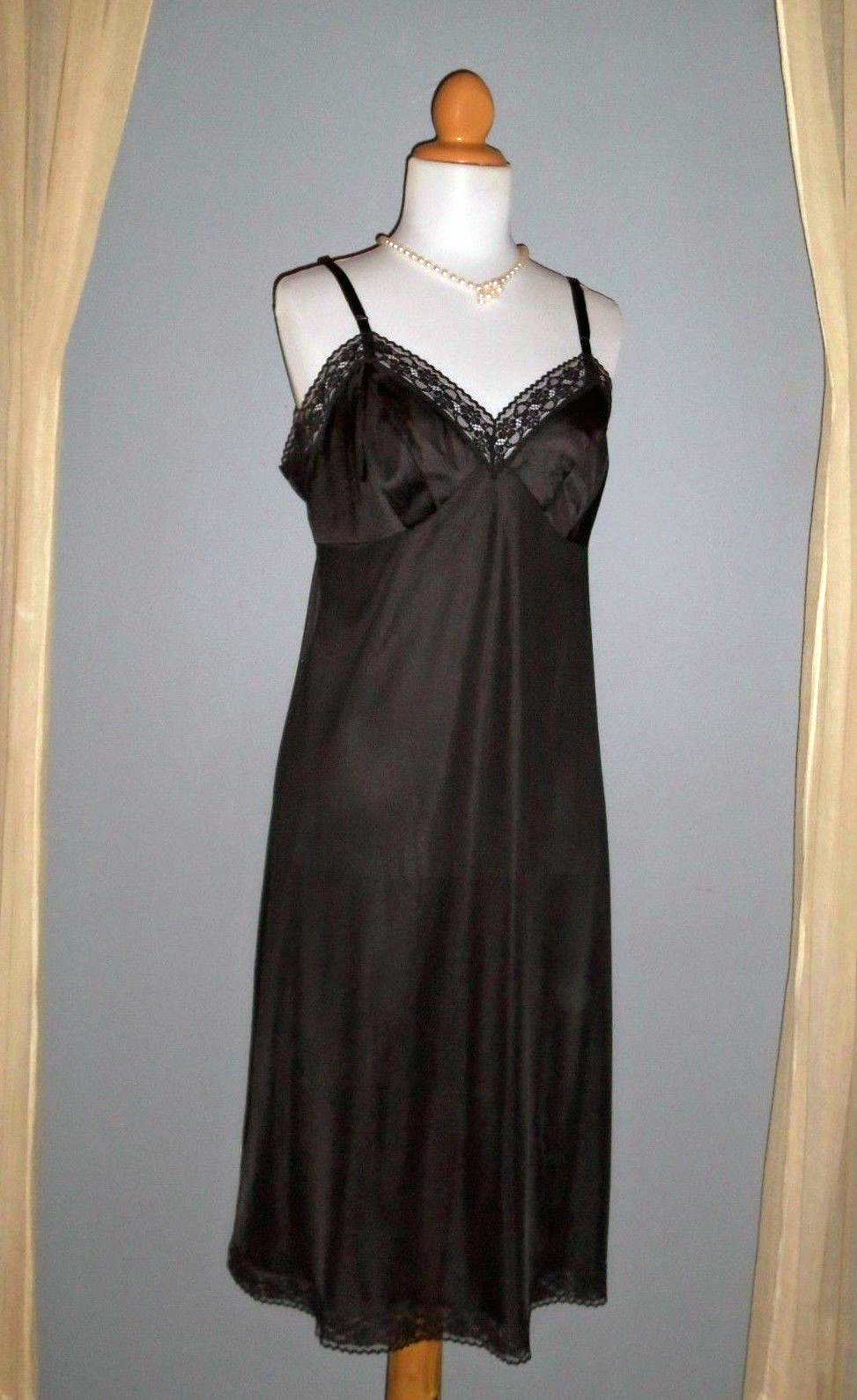
A modern Vanity Fair full slip

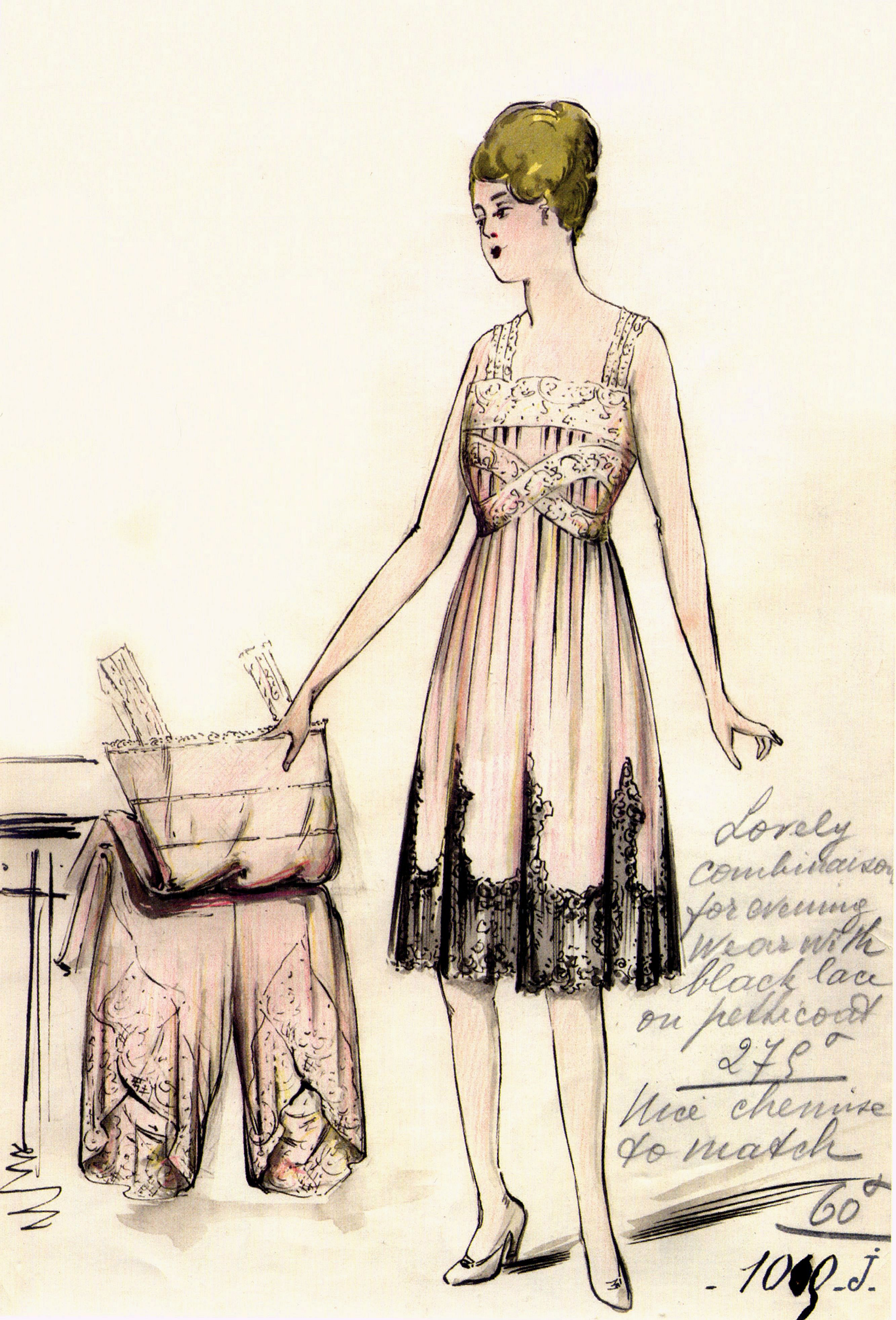
Design of a slip in 1916 by the House of Worth.

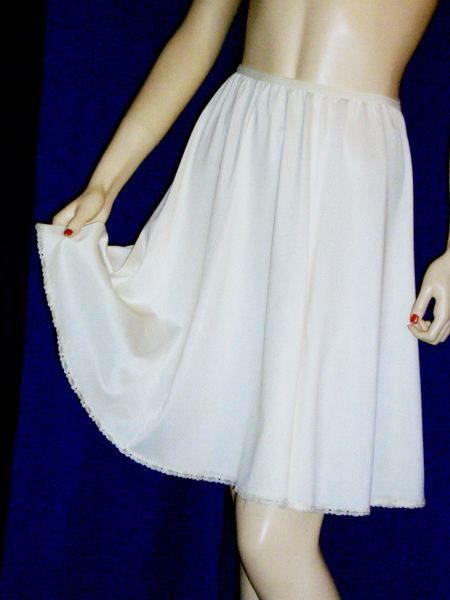
A modern-day half slip

A slip is a woman's undergarment worn beneath a dress or skirt. A full slip hangs from the shoulders, usually by means of narrow straps, and extends from the breast to the fashionable skirt length. A half slip (or waist slip) hangs from the waist. The word petticoat may also be used for half slips.

== Purposes ==
Slips serve various purposes. They help a dress or skirt hang properly, especially when static cling might otherwise cause the dress to wrap around the wearer's legs. They protect the skin from chafing against coarse fabrics such as wool; conversely, if the outer garment is made of fine fabric, a slip protects it from sweat. A slip may be worn for warmth, especially if the dress or skirt is lightweight and thin, whereas in very warm or humid climates, a slip made entirely from cotton may be desired. Slips are often worn to prevent the show-through of intimate undergarments such as panties or a brassiere. A slip may also be used to prevent a silhouette of the legs showing through clothing when standing in front of a bright light source.

== Types ==
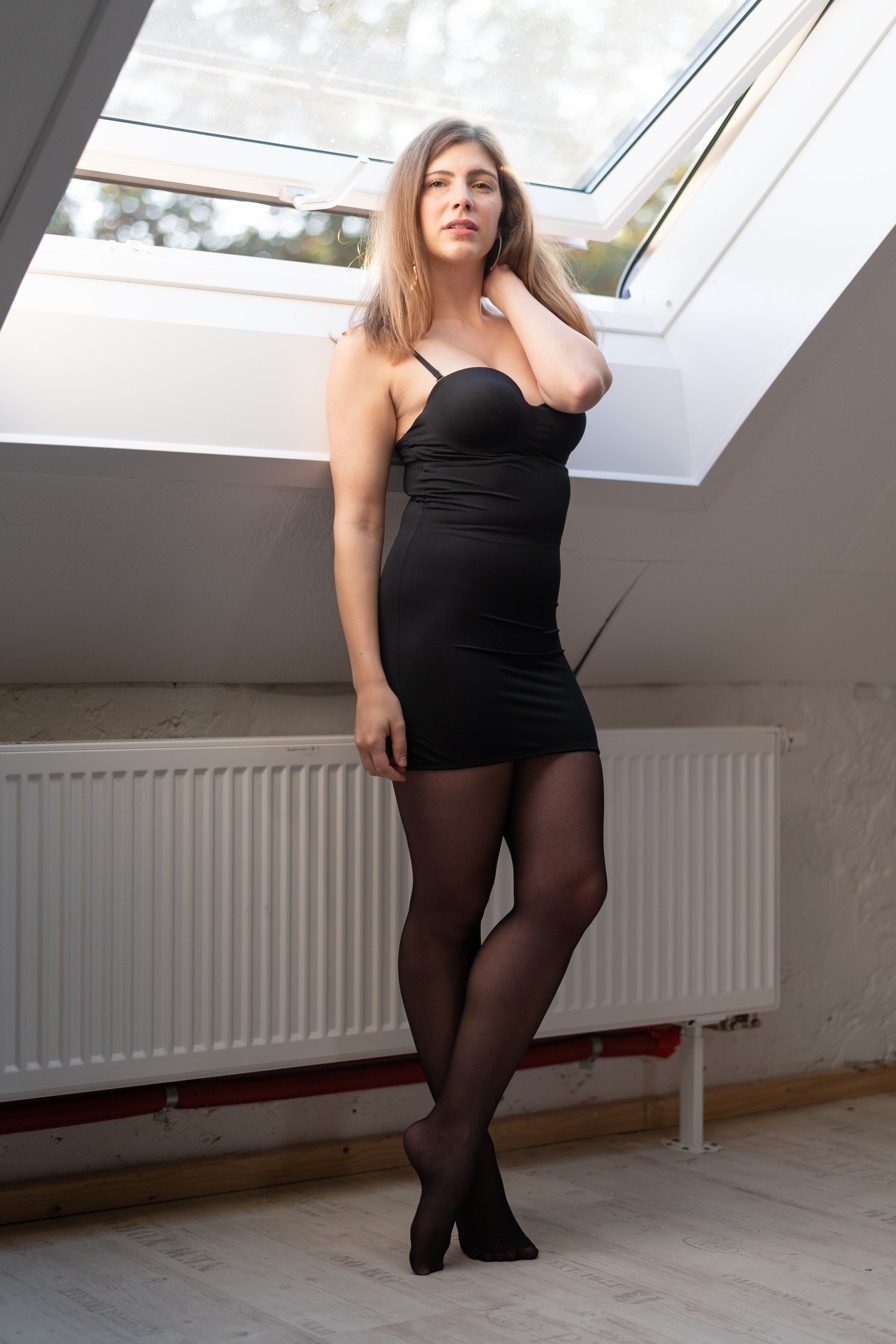
Modern full slip with integrated padded bra that may be also worn as a dress.

Slips fall into two major categories. A full slip hangs from the shoulders by straps that extend down to the top of the breast area, with a skirt below the bust. Full slips come in a variety of lengths; some extend down to the upper thigh, some to just above the knees, or just below the knees, while others go down to just above the ankles.

A waist slip, "half slip", or "underskirt", is held on to the body around the waist by means of an elastic waistband. The waist slip is also available in the same lengths as the aforementioned full slip. Waist slips that extend down to just above the ankle are often called formal slips, or maxi slips. Mini slips are yet another size option for waist slips. They were first introduced in the 1960s to wear under a mini skirt. American Maid manufactured waist slips that had vents and a rear zipper in addition to the elastic waistband. These slips were made of half nylon and half dacron polyester. As an alternative to the full slip, a waist slip with a matching camisole can be worn to provide full coverage.

There is also similar garment designed to be worn under thin or light-colored slacks, called trouserslips or pettipants. In addition to pants, a pettipant may also be worn under a dress or skirt, and like slips, they are mainly made of nylon or as a layer of luxury, in silk.

== Decorations and fabric ==
Many slips have floral lace at the hem, vents or sideslits. Some of the older slips have decorations, such as a butterfly or flowers sewn into the fabric of the slip, and a pillowtab was also added to the waistband of a waist slip.

The vast majority of modern slips are made entirely of nylon, while others are made from polyester, rayon, acetate, silk or in some cases cotton. Still, there are others made of blends, and the label of the garment might read, for example, "40% nylon, 35% rayon, 25% polyester". Nylon slips are often shiny in appearance, and are very smooth to the touch, while polyester slips can even be more shiny with a real slippery feel, especially charmeuse or "satin" slips. Although charmeuse slips have very attractive eye appeal, they are not as durable as nylon slips, and often tear very easily, especially when wet.

Most of the slips made since the late 20th century are plain and lacking in detail. Intricate decorations and lace designs are almost completely absent from modern-day slips.

== History ==
Slips made in the 1940s were mainly made entirely of rayon due to the war effort. In the late 1940s, some nylon slips began to appear on the market, and the vast majority of slips made in the 1950s were nylon. In the 1960s, slips were offered in a much greater variety of colours, including multi-coloured slips. Slips with a floral print design were also made available. Some of the most well known slip brand names of the past are: Lorraine, Dior, Velrose, Shadowline, Wondermaid, Warner's, Kayser, Maidenform and Van Raalte. There are well established slip/lingerie manufacturers still in operation today such as Vanity Fair, Vassarette, Farr West and Sliperfection.

With the rise of athleisure and comfort dressing, slips were worn less, because they were unnecessary with the popular clothing.

== Other usages ==
In men's formal wear, a slip is an under-waistcoat, usually white, worn with morning dress beneath the waistcoat and showing as a v-shape in the neckline.

The word "slip" has come to refer to a number of other undergarments in various languages. In German, French, Dutch and Italian the word “slip“ is commonly used for panties. (This is a false friend, as is the use of "le smoking" to describe a tuxedo jacket.) "Slip" is also sometimes used for the brief style of men's underwear.

Since the 1980s, dresses closely based on slips have become very popular. These are called slip dresses, and are meant to be worn on the outside.

In modest wear fashion, abaya inner slips are commonly used to ensure comfort, coverage, and a smooth silhouette. These slips help maintain the proper drape of the abaya while preventing the garment from clinging to the body. They also provide an additional layer, which can help with modesty, preventing any transparency or outlining of undergarments. Inner slips for abayas are typically made from lightweight, breathable fabrics such as cotton or satin, offering a comfortable fit throughout the day.
