= Gladys Aller =

American painter

- Born: July 13, 1915; Massachusetts
- Died: March 5, 1970 (aged 54); Los Angeles, California
- Resting place: Forest Lawn, Hollywood, CA
- Education: Chouinard Art Institute, Otis Art Institute, Arts Students League
- Known for: Watercolors, oils
- Notable work: "Portrait of Helen"
- Style: Southern California Watercolor, Ash Can School, Abstract Expressionism
- Spouse: Eugene "Jimmy" Farber

Gladys Aller (July 13, 1915 – March 5, 1970) was an American painter.

== Family ==
Gladys Aller was born in Massachusetts. Until applying for a passport in her forties, she thought she was born on July 14. Her father, Simeon Aller, being superstitious about Friday the 13th, had always told her she was born the day after. Her family was involved in music and the movie industry. Her father was a Jewish Russian emigre who moved with his brother, Joseph Aller, to Hollywood in 1920 to work in the film industry. Her uncle Joseph ran the darkroom for D. W. Griffith while her father sold raw film to the studios for Dupont. Her uncle Modest Altschuler was the conductor and founder of the Russian Symphony Orchestra while her uncle Gregory (Grisha) Aller and her cousin Eleanor Aller were both cellists and her cousin was pianist Victor Aller. Her cousin Boris Leven was an art director.

== 1915-1940 ==
She was the youngest member admitted to the California Watercolor Society at the age of 14. At 15 she left high school to attend the Otis Art Institute (now called the Otis College of Art and Design). She also studied in Los Angeles at Chouinard Art Institute. In 1933 she went to New York City to study at The Art Students League of New York with George Grosz, Richard Lahey, and John Sloan.

Her watercolor "Portrait of Helen" was purchased by the New York Metropolitan Museum in 1937. In the Metropolitan Museum of Art Bulletin 35.11 in 1940, Harry B. Wehle wrote, "The West Coast has in recent years produced a particularly promising crop of water colorists, including Millard Sheets, Dong Kingman, George Post, Alexander Nepote, Milford Zornes and Gladys Aller."

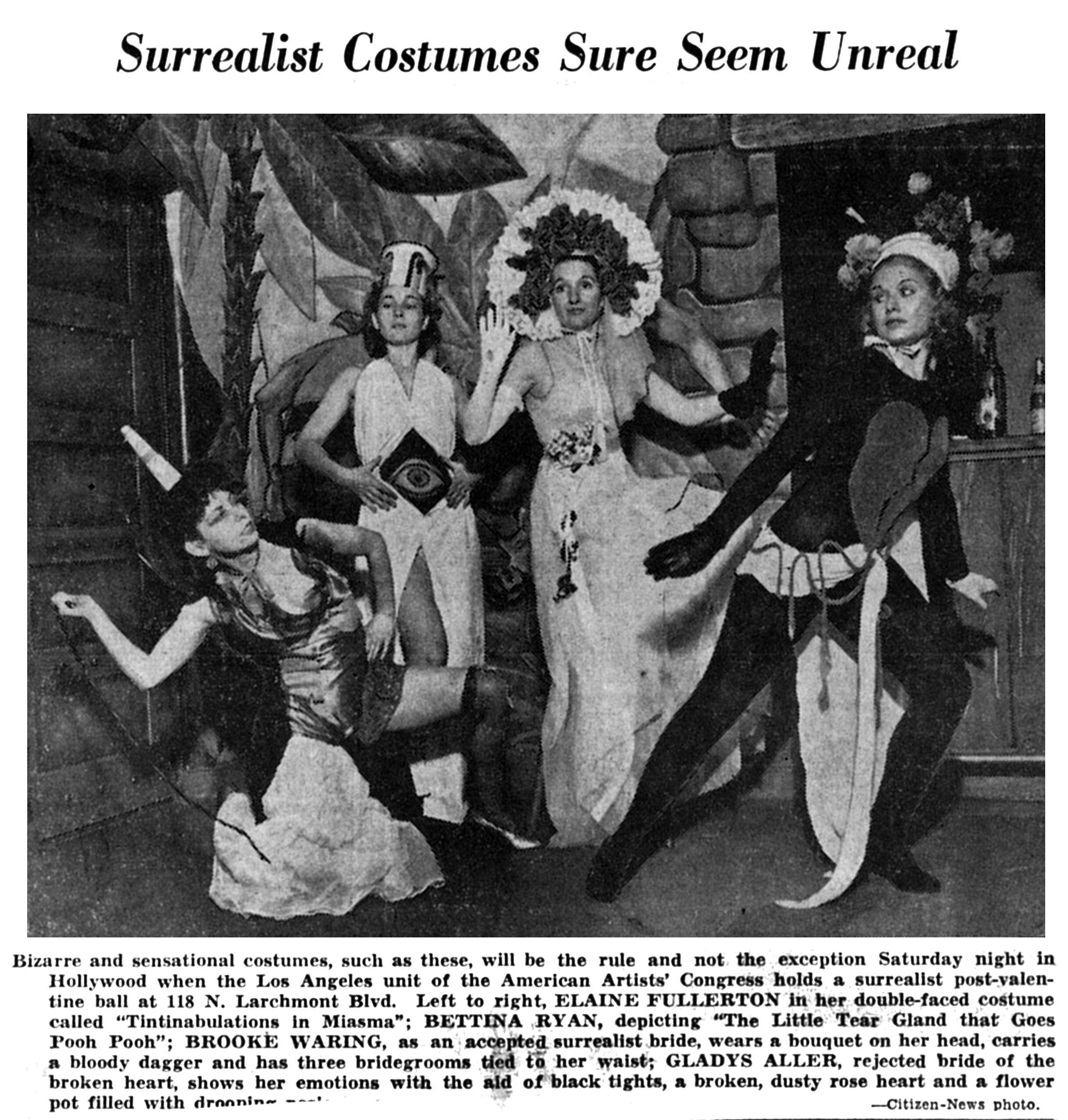

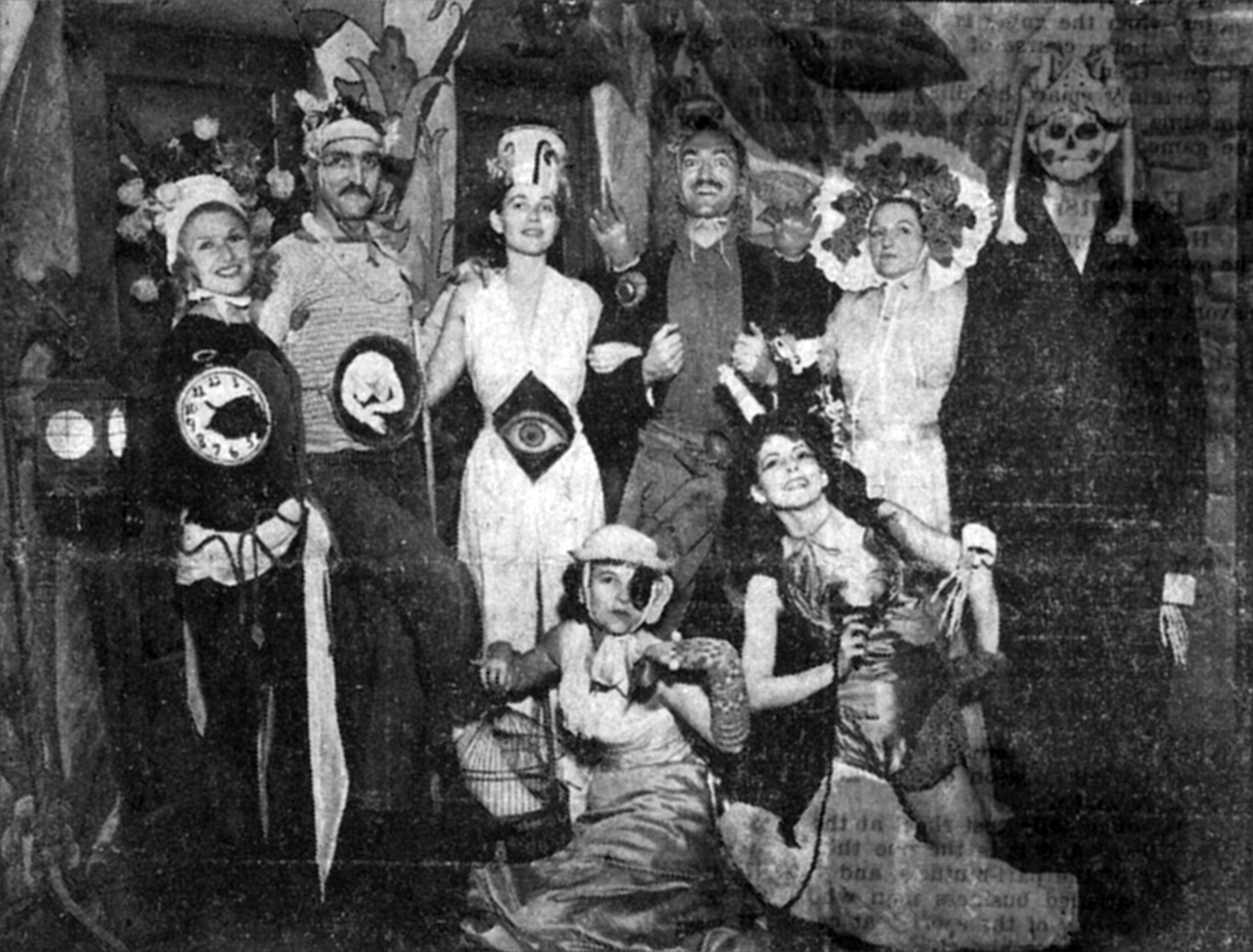

== 1940-1970 ==
On July 14, 1941, she married orthodontist Dr. Eugene "Jimmy" Farber, DDS, and moved with him to Los Angeles.

In the 1960s Gladys Aller, now known as Gladys Farber, became politically active, starting with "SOS - Stamp Out Smog" which led to the Clean Air Act. She was one of the original members of Women Strike for Peace working for nuclear disarmament and the Test Ban Treaty. She helped organize, and traveled on, a trip to the Soviet Union in the midst of the Cold War which they called "Women's Peace Plane to Moscow" in 1963. She subsequently became active in the anti-Vietnam War movement.

Artistically, in the 1950s and 1960s, her work moved away from figurative watercolors and oils and towards abstract expressionism from the earlier influences of the Ashcan School, the Southern California watercolor school, Diego Rivera and the Mexican Mural Movement, and German Expressionism. She worked in the studio of LA artist Sueo Serisawa. A close group of women painters gathered in that studio in the 1960s, often combining art with politics. Mary Clarke, Lucy Adelman (who was later one of the founders of the Womanspace Gallery and subsequently the ArtSpace Gallery), and Wallace Albertson were some of the other painters in the group.

== Sources ==
- Dimand, Maurice S., and Avery C. Louise. "Notes." The Metropolitan Museum of Art Bulletin 35.8 (1940): 165-67. Web.
- Edan Hughes, "Artists in California, 1786-1940"

Southern California Artists (Nancy Moure); California Arts and Architecture list, 1932; Who's Who in American Art 1938-62.
