= Timothy J. Clark (artist) =

American painter

- Born: June 30, 1951 (age 75); Santa Ana, California
- Education: Art Center College of Design, Chouinard Art Institute, CalArts, Cal State Long Beach
- Notable work: Paintings, Drawings and Portraits in Watercolor and Oil
- Movement: 21st Century New Realism
- Website: tclarkart.com

Timothy J. Clark (born June 30, 1951) is an American artist best known for his large watercolor paintings of urban landscapes, still lifes, and interiors, and for his oil and watercolor portraits. His paintings and drawings are in the permanent collections of more than twenty art museums.

== Early life ==
Clark was born and raised in Santa Ana, California. He attended the Art Center School of Design where he worked with Harry Carmean in 1969. He graduated from the Chouinard Art Institute in Los Angeles (CFA '72) and the California Institute of the Arts (BA 1975) where he worked with Harold Kramer, Emerson Woelffer, and Donald W. Graham. Clark received his master's degree from California State University, Long Beach in 1978 where he worked with Joyce Tremain.

== Career ==
Clark merges the atmosphere of the landscape with still life and interiors in monumental watercolor paintings. Most recently, he has returned to his lifelong love of Hispanic culture, creating a new series of extremely large watercolors from eleven of Spain's autonomous regions, Portugal, and across the Americas. These works celebrate a rich Hispanic visual heritage through the vigorous and highly personal artistic responses that are the trademarks of his work. Other Clark subjects of note are his iconic bicycles, lemons, and urban landscapes. These paintings, curated by Senior Curator Marcus Burke, were exhibited in American Travelers: A Watercolor Journey Through Spain, Portugal and Mexico Featuring the Works of Timothy J. Clark, at the Hispanic Society Museum in New York City in 2022. [32][33][34]

Also known for his portraits in charcoal, watercolor and oil, Clark's solo exhibition, Family Reunion: Portraits by Timothy J. Clark, was curated by Lisa Farrington, Ph D. for Howard University in Winter 2022.[31] Clark's commissioned oil portraits include those of Sir Eldon Griffin, MP; Chief Judge Sandra L. Lynch, US Court of Appeals for the First Circuit, Moakley Federal Courthouse, Boston, MA[22]; and Judges Sandra L. Lynch, O. Rogeriee Thompson, and Juan R. Torruella for Boston University School of Law. His watercolor portraits of artists Faith Ringgold and Will Barnet were acquired by the National Portrait Gallery.[1][23]

== Exhibitions ==
- In 2008, a mid-career retrospective exhibition of Clark's work was organized by the Pasadena Museum of California Art and guest-curated by Mr. Jean Stern. More than forty drawings, oils and watercolors created over four decades were shown at the Pasadena museum from January - April, at the Butler Institute of American Art in Youngstown, Ohio from June - August, and the Whistler House Museum of Art in Lowell, Massachusetts August - October.
- “Expressive Luminescence” at the Nevada Museum of Art, Reno (2010 – 2011)
- “Timothy J. Clark” at the Laguna Art Museum, Laguna Beach, California, (2012 – 2013);
- “In the Presence of Sacred Light” at LUMA (the Loyola University Museum of Art), Chicago, (2015)
- “Timothy J. Clark: Masterworks on Paper” at the Fort Smith Regional Art Museum in Arkansas (2018 – 2019)[5]
- 2022 Howard University, Family Reunion: Portraits by Timothy J. Clark

Paintings by Clark have also been exhibited in international exhibitions at the Allied Museum in Berlin, Germany, the Topkapi Museum in Istanbul[24], and in a solo exhibition at the Rosenfeld Gallery in Juarez, Mexico.

== Collections ==
Clark's paintings, drawings and portraits are in over twenty-five museum and public collections in the United States including:

- Arkansas Art Center
- Boston Federal Courthouse
- Boston University School of Law
- Butler Institute of American Art, Youngstown, Ohio
- El Paso Museum of Art, Texas
- Farnsworth Art Museum, Maine
- Fort Smith Regional Art Museum, Arkansas [36]
- Hilbert Museum of Art, Chapman University, Orange, California
- Hispanic Society Museum & Library, New York [32]
- Howard University Gallery of Art, Washington, D.C. [31]
- Laguna Art Museum, California [7]
- Library of Congress, Works on Paper, Washington D.C.
- Loyola University Museum of Art (LUMA), Chicago [9]
- Museum of the City of New York
- National Portrait Gallery, Smithsonian Institution, Washington D.C.
- Polk Museum of Art, Lakeland, Florida
- Springfield Museum of Art, Missouri
- University of California Institute and Museum of Art, Irvine
- Whistler House Museum of Art, Lowell, Massachusetts

== Author, and television host ==
In 1987, Clark wrote the book Focus on Watercolor in cooperation with the Metropolitan and Whitney Museums in New York. The book served as a companion to the thirteen-part PBS series of the same name released in 1989 for which Clark served as writer and on-air host. The series aired on PBS stations throughout North America and received an Emmy nomination.

== Artist educator ==
Clark has taught and lectured at institutions including Yale University's Continuity and Change Program is Rome, the National Academy, the Art Students League of New York, and the University of Hawaii at Hilo.[1] From 2003 – 2013, he served on the Alumni Board for the California Institute of the Arts (CalARTS).

In January 2017, Clark accepted a five-month appointment as Interim Executive Director at the Art Students League of New York. While there, he established new programming in animation with Mark Osborne, a fashion program with Bil Donovan, and hosted panel discussions with Wayne Thiebaud and Philip Pearlstein. His panel with Dr. Michael White dealt with the crossover in composition between painter and musician.

A book, “Timothy J. Clark”, was published by Pomegranate Communications in 2008. With a biographical essay by Mr. Jean Stern, formerly Director of the Irvine Museum in Southern California, and a critical essay by art historian and author, Dr. Lisa E. Farrington, the book also served as a catalog for Clark's retrospective.

Clark's work is represented by Lois Wagner Fine Art in New York City and Harmon-Meek Galleries in Naples, Florida.

== Personal life ==
In 1991, Clark married Marriott Small, an executive in book publishing. Her image is often seen in Clark's interiors. Her organizational skills and inspiration have supported a refinement in his vision. The couple maintain homes in Southern California, Maine, and New York City.

== Selected bibliography ==
"American Travelers: A Watercolor Journey Through Spain, Portugal and Mexico Featuring the Contemporary Works of Timothy J. Clark," Hispanic Society Museum & Library, New York, New York, exhibition catalog, 2022

"Family Reunion: Portraits by Timothy J. Clark", Howard University, Washington D.C., exhibition catalog, 2022

"In Living Color: Timothy J. Clark’s Poetic Realism", by Leo J. Donovan, America Magazine, June 6, 2013

"Timothy J. Clark," by Janet Blake, Curator, Laguna Art Museum exhibition brochure, 2012

"Timothy J. Clark," by Stern, Farrington; Published by Pomegranate Communications, Petaluma, California, January 2008

"Luminaries at the League, Now All Over Town," by Holland Cotter, New York Times, September 9, 2005

"His Art and Soul," by Brad Bonhall, Los Angeles Times, March 27, 2000
