= Peter Menefee =

American costume designer

Pete Menefee
- Occupations: Costume designer, performer, dancer

Pete Menefee is an American dancer, performer, and costume- and stage-designer who has worked in Hollywood since the 1960s. He has been nominated for four Emmy Awards, winning three times, the most recent being in 2002 in the "Outstanding Costumes for a Variety or Music Program" for the opening ceremony of the 2002 Winter Olympics, held in Salt Lake City, Utah. The other two were in 1980 and 1988. He was nominated in 1987.

== Early life ==
Menefee was born in San Diego, California. He grew up in San Diego and in Hawaii. His father was a doctor in the United States Navy.

He was educated at San Diego State University and at the Chouinard Art Institute. He began taking dancing lessons at age ten. Although he did not like ballet, it was a requirement for the San Diego Civic Light Opera, which he had joined. He studied under Gladys Bowen for around six years.

Menefee began his career as a professional dancer; his first performance was as Harvey Johnson in the 1963 film version of the stage musical Bye Bye Birdie at the age of 18.

At the age of 21, he was one of the twelve chimney sweeps who appeared in the 1964 Disney movie Mary Poppins, supporting Dick Van Dyke as Bert. He was only in the rooftop scene and the street scene; he had left to film for My Fair Lady prior to the scene inside the Banks house.

Menefee went on to work in television, appearing in television specials, featuring among others Ann-Margret, Nancy Sinatra, and Petula Clark. He was also performer and choreographer for Where The Action Is for Dick Clark, and was a frequent performer on ABC's The Hollywood Palace. He appeared in five movies alongside Elvis Presley, including Viva Las Vegas, Girls! Girls! Girls!, Clambake, and Kissing Cousins. He also worked a lot with Peter Foy, who was known for his flying effects on stage.

In 1980, Menefee survived the MGM Grand fire in Las Vegas, Nevada.

== Personal life ==
Menefee was in a relationship with Tom Hatten for over fifty years. Hatten died in 2019, aged 92.
