= Roberson Museum and Science Center =

Museum in Binghamton, New York

Roberson Museum
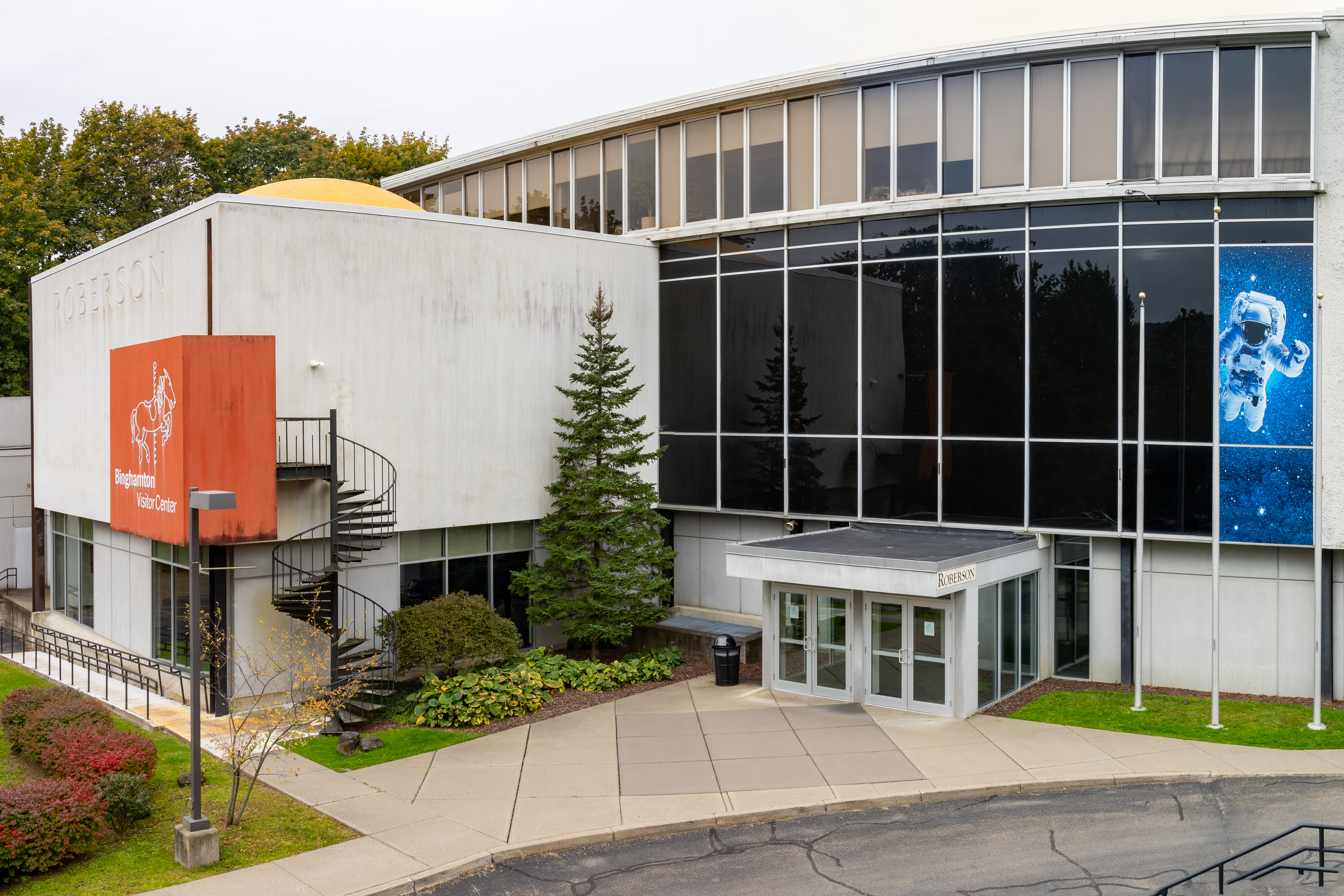
- The main entrance of Roberson Museum
- Interactive fullscreen map
- Established: 1954
- Location: 30 Front Street, Binghamton, NY 13905
- Coordinates: 42°5′39″N 75°55′8″W
- Website: https://roberson.org/

Roberson Museum is located in Binghamton, New York. The museum's exhibits focus on art, regional history, science, and natural history.

== History ==
Roberson Memorial, Inc. was established by the will of Alonzo Roberson in 1934. Following the death of his widow Margaret, the Roberson Memorial Center opened to the public in 1954 for use as a community educational center.

The centerpiece of the museum is the 1906 Roberson Mansion, which was designed by local architect C. Edward Vosbury. A major addition to the building was constructed in 1966, designed by Richard Neutra, which increased exhibition space, added offices, and included a planetarium. The museum was further expanded in 1984 in order to enlarge collections storage and create a new collections preparation area.

The Roberson Museum is an accredited member of the American Alliance of Museums and a member of the Association of Science and Technology Centers.

== Exhibitions ==
Roberson features a number of permanent and temporary exhibits that display the works of local and regional artists, present local history, and educate visitors on scientific topics.

=== Permanent exhibitions ===
- Roberson Family History - Showcases some unique items from the Robersons that offer insight into the lives of the family, the mansion, and the A. Roberson & Son lumber company.
- Haudenosaunee: People of the Longhouse - Tells the story of the Haudenosaunee Confederacy, their impact on the region prior to colonialism, and their continued stewardship today through objects, art, and interactive displays.
- Model Train Layout - The region’s largest public model train display. The layout depicts the 1950s era, with regional landscapes including Binghamton, Johnson City, Owego, Endicott, and parts of Northern Pennsylvania.
- Nature Trek - Over 150 mounted specimens on display in representations of the region’s deciduous and transitional forests, wetlands, meadows, and backyard habitats.
- The Legacy of Link - Celebrates Edwin Albert Link, a pioneer in aviation, underwater archaeology, and submersibles.
