= Tom Hatten =

American actor

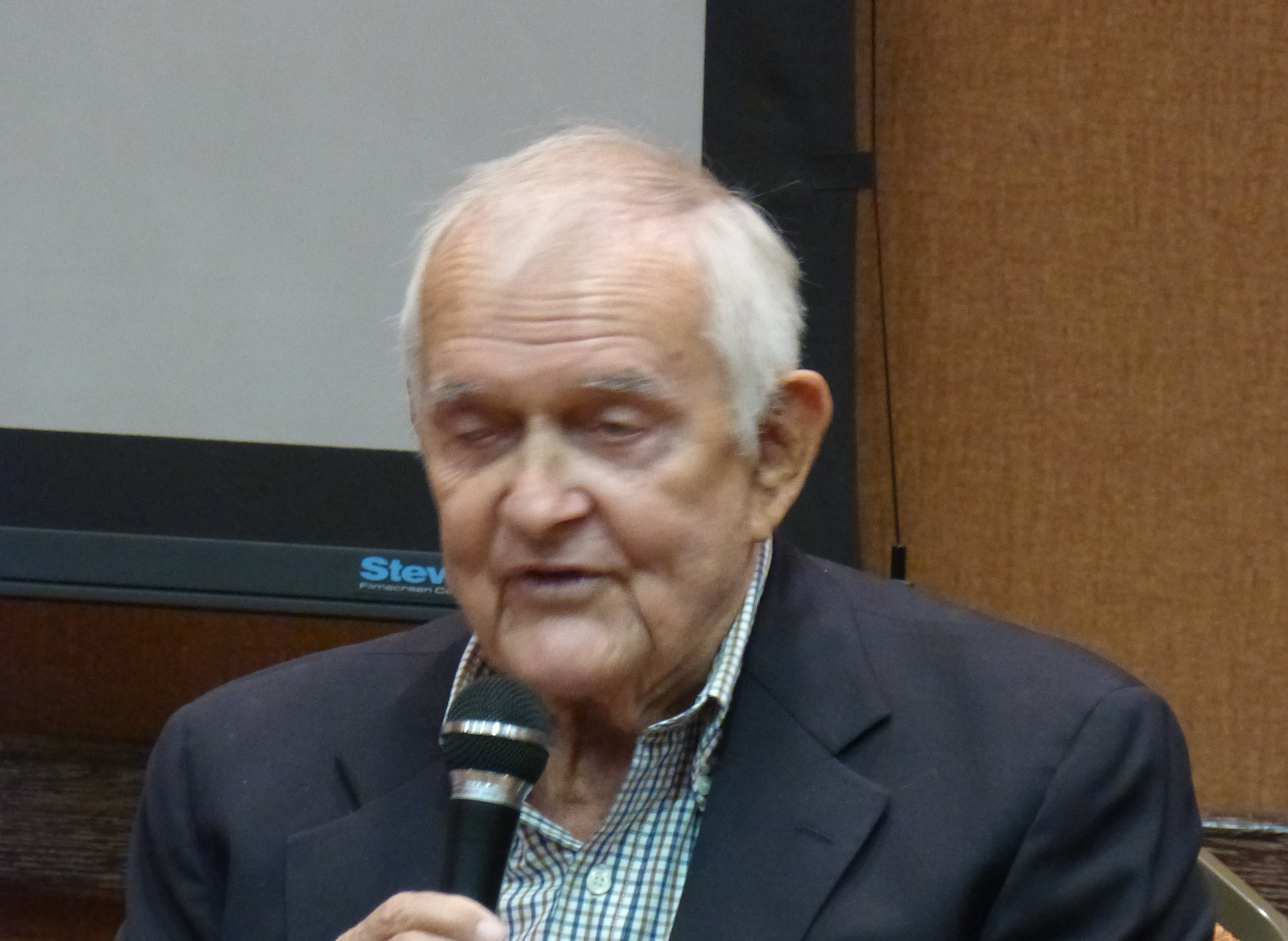
- Hatten in 2013
- Born: November 14, 1926; Jamestown, North Dakota, U.S.
- Died: March 16, 2019 (aged 92); California, U.S.
- Occupations: Actor; TV kids' show host; radio broadcaster

Tom Hatten (November 14, 1926 – March 16, 2019) was an American radio, film and television personality and actor, known as the long-time host of The Popeye Show (originally The Pier Point 5 Club) and Family Film Festival on KTLA Channel 5 in Los Angeles from the 1960s until the 1980s. Hatten was one of those television "pioneers"—from the 1950s and 1960s programs done "live"—no matter what mistakes happened. He also appeared in dozens of musicals, films and television shows.

== Early life ==
Hatten was born in Jamestown, North Dakota. He served in the United States Navy during World War II and used the GI Bill to study acting at the Pasadena Playhouse. He graduated cum laude in 1950.

== The Popeye Show ==
In 1952, Hatten started working as a broadcaster at KTLA in Hollywood. He was a newscaster and announcer when the station launched the afternoon children's show, The Pier 5 Club, with Hatten as Skipper Tom in September 1956.

The demise of The Pier 5 Club came in 1964 when Hatten left KTLA. In 1976, however, he returned to the station and revived the series as Popeye and His Friends, which ran until 1988.

Following the end of the Popeye program, Hatten was host of KTLA's Family Film Festival.

== Family Film Festival ==
The Family Film Festival was a weekend-afternoon feature on KTLA 5 between 1978 and 1992, with Hatten screening a classic film, often from the 1940s, 1950s or 1960s. During breaks in the show, he would offer anecdotes about the film's history or its actors, or conduct brief interviews with a cast or crew member. Many Gen X men and women, born throughout the 1970s, were introduced to the films of Jerry Lewis, The Little Rascals, and Pippi Longstocking, as well as animated films like Gay Purr-ee, Hoppity Goes to Town, The Phantom Tollbooth, Once Upon a Time and Star Blazers through Hatten's Family Film Festival.

== Career ==
Hatten's acting credits include portraying a corrupt US Army general in the comedy film Spies Like Us (1985), with Dan Aykroyd and Chevy Chase. He appeared as Captain Murdock in several episodes of the television show Gomer Pyle, U.S.M.C. and had a minor role as an officer in three episodes of Hogan's Heroes. Hatten provided the voice of the character Farmer Fitzgibbons in the animated film The Secret of NIMH.

On stage, in 1959, Hatten performed in a Los Angeles production of The Billy Barnes Revue concurrently with hosting the Popeye TV show. He portrayed Horace Vandergelder in the West Coast Opera Theatre's production of Hello, Dolly! in 1991. He also appeared in a touring production of the musical Annie as President Franklin Delano Roosevelt.

For nearly 20 years, Hatten worked as an award-winning entertainment reporter for KNX 1070 News radio in Los Angeles, filing regular reports on the movie industry, new films, and celebrity news. He left the station in 2007.

Hatten served on the board of the National Student Film Institute and was a frequent presenter at its annual film festival.

== Personal life ==
Hatten was in a relationship with costume and set designer Peter Menefee for over fifty years.

== Death ==
Hatten died on March 16, 2019, at the age of 92.

== Filmography ==
Year	Title	Role	Notes
1965	I Saw What You Did	Gerald Nyes	
1965	A Very Special Favor	Therapy Group Member	Uncredited
1967	Easy Come, Easy Go	Lt. J.G	Uncredited
1969	Sweet Charity	Man in Tandem	Uncredited
1975	Promise Him Anything	O'Brien	TV movie
1982	The Secret of NIMH	Farmer Fitzgibbons	Voice
1985	Spies Like Us	General Miegs	
2004	Bravura	Mr. Casey	Short, (final film role)
