= Modest Altschuler =

Cellist, orchestral conductor, and composer

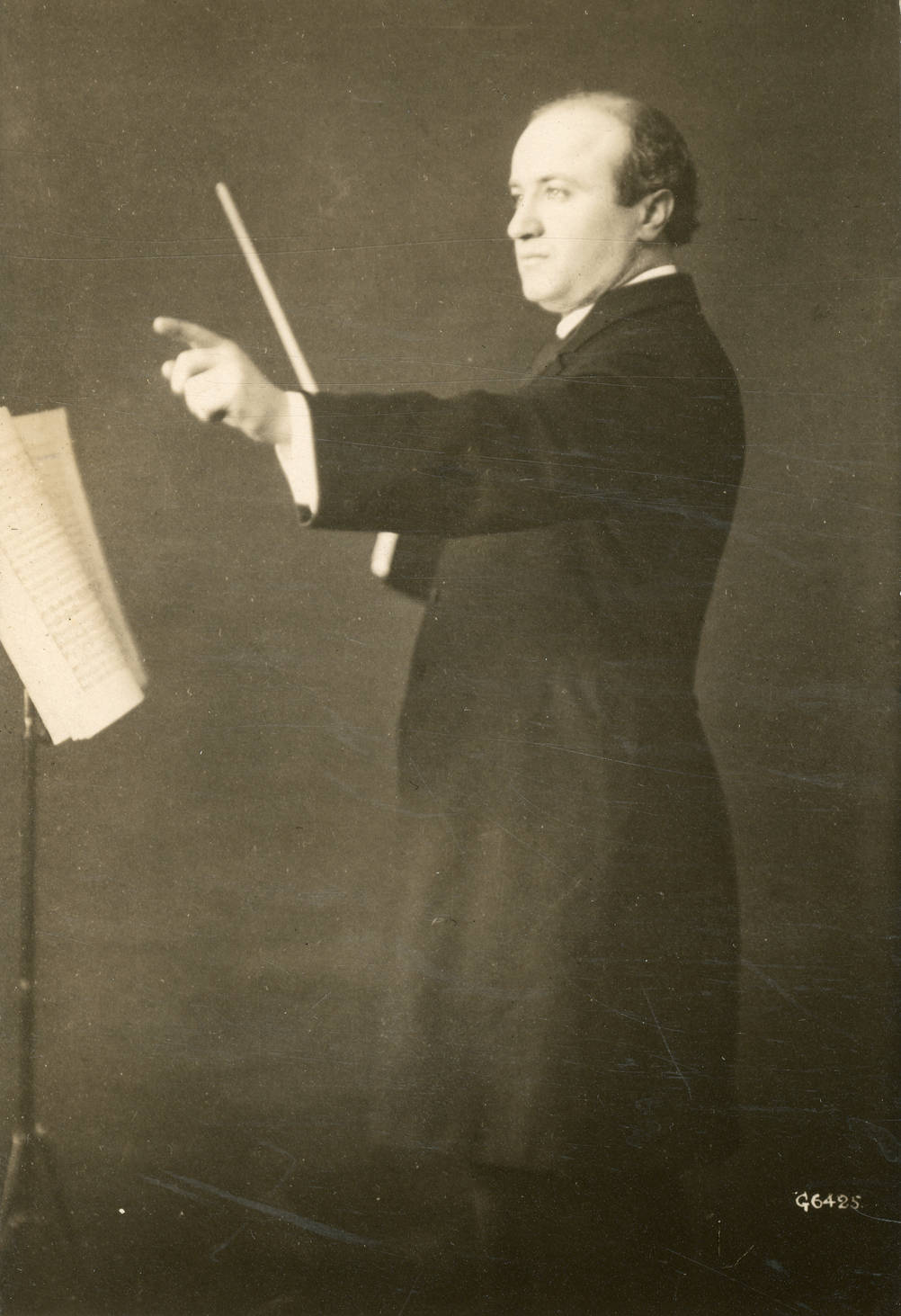
- Altschuler, 1911

Background information
- Born: February 15, 1873; Mogilev
- Died: September 12, 1963 (aged 90) Los Angeles
- Genres: Classical
- Occupations: Cellist, orchestral conductor, and composer
- Instrument: Cello
- Label: Columbia
- Formerly of: Russian Symphony Orchestra Society

Modest (Moisei Isaacovich) Altschuler (February 15, 1873 – September 12, 1963) was a cellist, orchestral conductor, and composer.

He was born in Mogilev, then part of the Russian Empire, now in Belarus, into a Jewish family. He studied at the Moscow Conservatory and emigrated to the United States in 1893.

In 1903 Altschuler organized the Russian Symphony Orchestra Society of New York City, which for two decades toured the United States featuring performances and compositions by leading contemporary Russians. Among the Orchestra's notable premieres were Sergei Prokofiev Prokofiev's Piano Concerto No. 1 in D-flat major, Op. 10, which was performed at Carnegie Hall in New York on December 10, 1918 and Mussorgsky's Prelude to Khovanshchina, which Altschuler presented at Carnegie Hall on February 25, 1905. The Orchestra was among the first established orchestral ensembles to record for the gramophone; Columbia discs of short pieces by Tchaikovsky, Eduard Lassen and others date from 1911 and 1912. Their most important disc was the first recording of Mikhail Glinka's orchestral fantasy Kamarinskaya, complete on two sides, recorded on 26 June 1911. Nathaniel Shilkret, a member of the Orchestra, notes in his autobiography that soloists in the Orchestra included Mischa Elman, Josef Lhevinne, Sergei Rachmaninoff, and Vassily Safanov. Shilkret also noted that the Orchestra "played for the great ballerina Pavlova and her partner Mordkin [1910]."

Despite his rigorous classical training, Altschuler was not averse to modernist experimentation. The Symphony's March 1915 New York premiere of Alexander Scriabin's Promethee: Le Poeme de Feu (Prometheus: The Poem of Fire) with Marguerite Volavy as pianist, featured a newly invented device, the chromola, which rendered musical tones in color.

After disbanding the orchestra on the eve of the first World War, Altschuler moved to California, where he built a notable reputation as a teacher and performer. With help from his cousin, film executive Joe Aller, he composed and performed in film scores, including The Sea Hawk (1924), Dawn to Dawn (1933), It's All in Your mind (1938), Buffalo Bill Rides Again (1947), and Song of My Heart (1948), He was also active in southern California's musical community. In 1926, he organized the Glendale Symphony Orchestra.

Altschuler founded a musical dynasty which includes his niece Eleanor Aller, his grand-nephew symphony conductor Leonard Slatkin, cellist Frederick Zlotkin, violinist Judith Aller, singer/songwriter Jody Cormack and composer Dylan Mattingly. Aller and her husband Felix Slatkin were principals in the Hollywood String Quartet one of America's most accomplished classical ensembles in the period 1947-1961.

Modest Altschuler died in Los Angeles on September 12, 1963.
