= First Presbyterian Church (Utica, New York) =

Historic church in New York, United States

- U.S. National Register of Historic Places
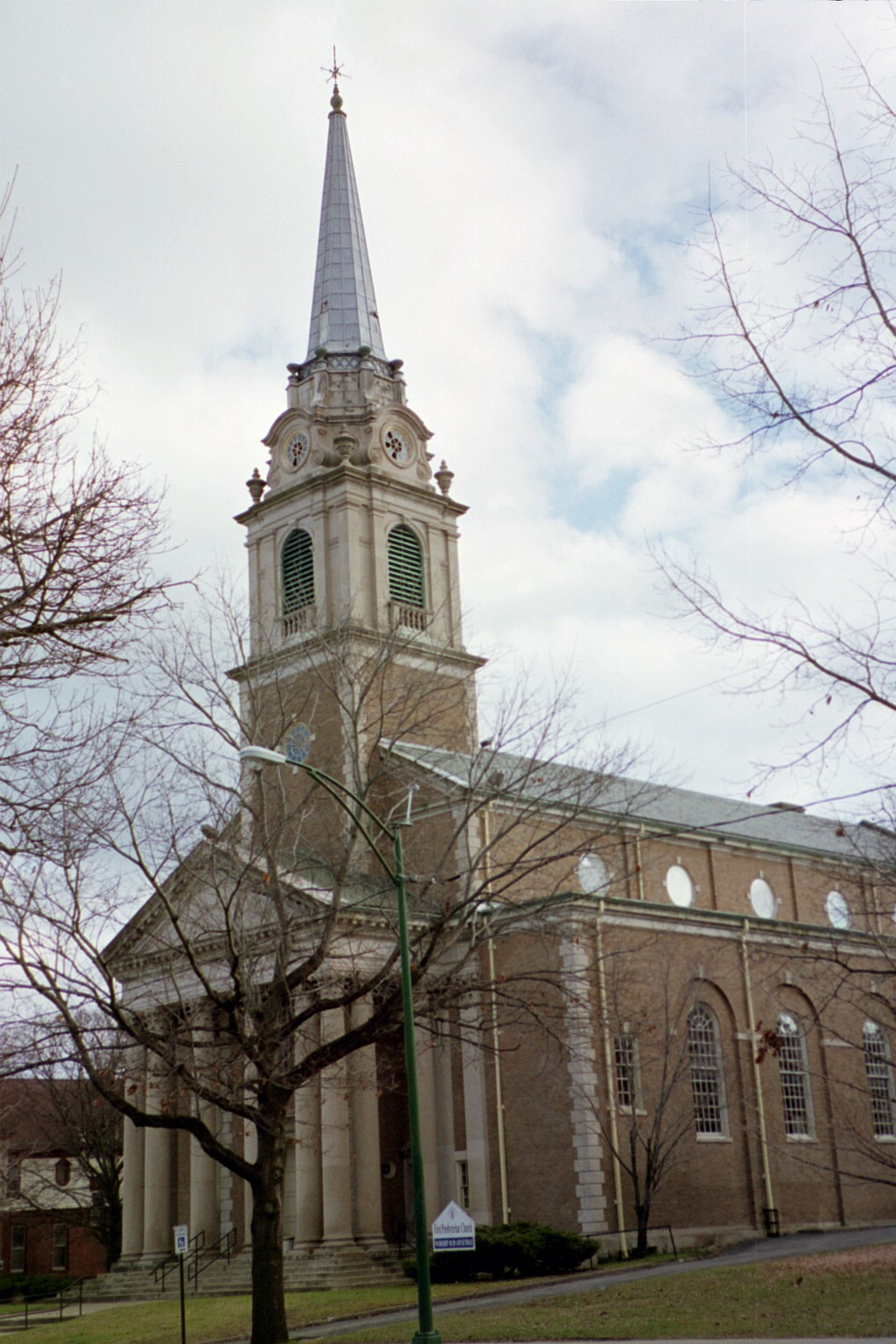

- Location within New York Location within the United States
- Location: 1605 Genesee Street, Utica, New York
- Coordinates: 43°5′29″N 75°15′1″W
- Built: 1899 (McKinnon House); 1920 (church)
- Architect: C. Edward Vosbury (McKinnon House); Ralph Adams Cram (church)
- Architectural style: Colonial Revival, Beaux Arts
- NRHP reference No.: 88002172
- Added to NRHP: November 3, 1988

The First Presbyterian Church is a historic church building in Utica, New York, United States. The church and its related McKinnon House were added to the National Register of Historic Places in 1988. The structures are notable for their early twentieth century design and architecture.

The church was designed by Boston architect Ralph Adams Cram and built in 1922. The McKinnon House was designed by Binghamton architect C. Edward Vosbury and built in 1899.

1961 saw the joining of the Church and the Church House with the construction of a number of classrooms, Fellowship Hall, and a modernized kitchen, and the installation of a Casavant Freres organ.

== Ministries ==
The church facility hosts several ministries, including:

- The Seeds of Hope Food Pantry - First Presbyterian Church maintains a well-stocked food pantry, which provides nutritional food and food products to individuals and families living in the region around the church. The pantry is a partnership of New Hartford First Methodist, New Hartford Presbyterian, Our Saviour Lutheran, and Utica First Presbyterian Churches. The pantry is open on Tuesdays and Thursdays from 9:30 to 11:30 am.
- The Clothes Closet - The Clothes Closet provides free, clean, serviceable clothing for those who have a need for such items. Most sizes are available for adults, children, and infants. The closet is open on Thursdays from 9:00 to 11:00 am, and is open every Wednesday morning to accept donations.
- Free community Thanksgiving dinner - Prepared and served on Thanksgiving Day every year since 1978. For individuals who are homebound and unable to come to the church, arrangements can be made in advance to have a complete meal delivered. Dinner is served from 12:00 noon to 2:00 pm on Thanksgiving Day.
- Universal Pre-K at First Church and First Nursery School of Utica - First Presbyterian Church assists the Nursery School by providing scholarship grants for some students. Classrooms and offices are located within the facilities of First Church. Universal Pre-K classes have an average enrollment of 80 students, attending for five half-day sessions a week. First Nursery School of Utica classes for 3-year old children are held three mornings a week.

== History ==
Long before Utica was incorporated as a city in 1832, it was a small village known as Fort Schuyler. Having been carved from unbroken wilderness fifteen years before, it was there that First Presbyterian Church was organized, the oldest church in what was to become Utica. First Church was a sister to Whitesboro Presbyterian Church, being one and the same at the beginning of 1793 and known as "The United Society of Whitestown." On February 18, 1794, this society was received into the Presbytery of Albany, being then farther west than any other Presbyterian church.

The Rev. Bethuel Dodd was appointed and installed as the society's first pastor on August 21, 1794. Officiating in both congregations, Dodd spent two thirds of his time in Whitestown and one third in Fort Schuyler, his support shared by both churches.

The Fort Schuyler congregation, legally incorporated as a church in 1804, assembled first in the village schoolhouse on Main Street and was later granted the use of Trinity Episcopal Church on Broad Street until a worship place could be constructed. In 1807 a church was built on lower Washington Street. Used for twenty years, it was divided and moved to make way for a building of a larger structure. Dedicated in 1827, the new church was constructed of brick and included a spire 215 feet high. In 1813, the Utica congregation called the Rev. Henry Dwight as its first full time pastor. The corporation then took the name of "The First Utica Presbyterian Society", which remains the church's legal name to this day.

Following a disastrous fire in 1851, the imposing structure of Old First Church was built in the Romanesque Revival style on the northeast corner of Washington and Columbia Streets. This building served as a worship place for nearly 70 years. In 1919 it was decided to break with tradition and move "uptown" to what was then considered suburban Utica.

In May 1921, the Society purchased the MacKinnon-Borst estate, its present property, as the site for a new sanctuary. While the committee took stock of the possibilities of the MacKinnon house (currently used as the Church House, and also referred to as "Molly's House" as a venue for coffeehouses and other events), worship was held in temporary quarters on Oneida Square.

Ralph Adams Cram, architect for the Cathedral of St. John the Divine in New York City, was chosen to design the new church. A major requirement of the plans was to reuse the walnut pews from the Washington Street church, a factor which would determine many of the dimensions of the new church. Some of the decorative woodwork in Brewer Chapel came from the old building and temporarily graced the Oneida Square storefront which was used as a transitional sanctuary.

Groundbreaking for the new building occurred in July 1922, followed by the laying of the cornerstone in December. Occupancy and dedication took place on Sunday, May 11, 1924, followed by four weeks of special events. The total cost of the building of the church was somewhat over $275,000, most of which was raised at two worship services in May 1922.

The structure now called the Church House was built in 1899 as a lavish private residence by Robert MacKinnon. It cost MacKinnon $150,000 to build and $50,000 - $75,000 to operate. A few years later, MacKinnon was forced into bankruptcy and in 1911 the home was purchased for $40,000 by Charles A. Borst and his wife Grace Olmstead Borst. After his unexpected death in 1918, Mrs. Borst was forced to sell the house for $50,000 to a group of entrepreneurs who planned to turn it into an apartment house. Before the new owners had occupied the building, the church became interested in the property and the resale price climbed overnight to $65,000.

1961 saw the joining of the Church and the Church House with the construction of a number of classrooms, Fellowship Hall, and a modernized kitchen, and the installation of a Casavant Freres organ.

Throughout its history, First Presbyterian Church has had a strong mission emphasis. It has produced at least 17 missionaries and 24 ministers. The first Home Missionary Society was established in 1843 and in 1877 the women's Missionary Society was organized.

As of February 2020, the church building was for sale.
