= California Heritage Museum =

Heritage museum in Santa Monica, California

- Former name: Santa Monica Heritage Museum
- Location: 2612 Main Street, Santa Monica, California
- Coordinates: 34.0020°N 118.4839°W
- Executive director: Tobi Smith
- Website: californiaheritagemuseum.org

The California Heritage Museum is located in Santa Monica, California in the landmarked Roy Jones house on Main Street.

== History ==
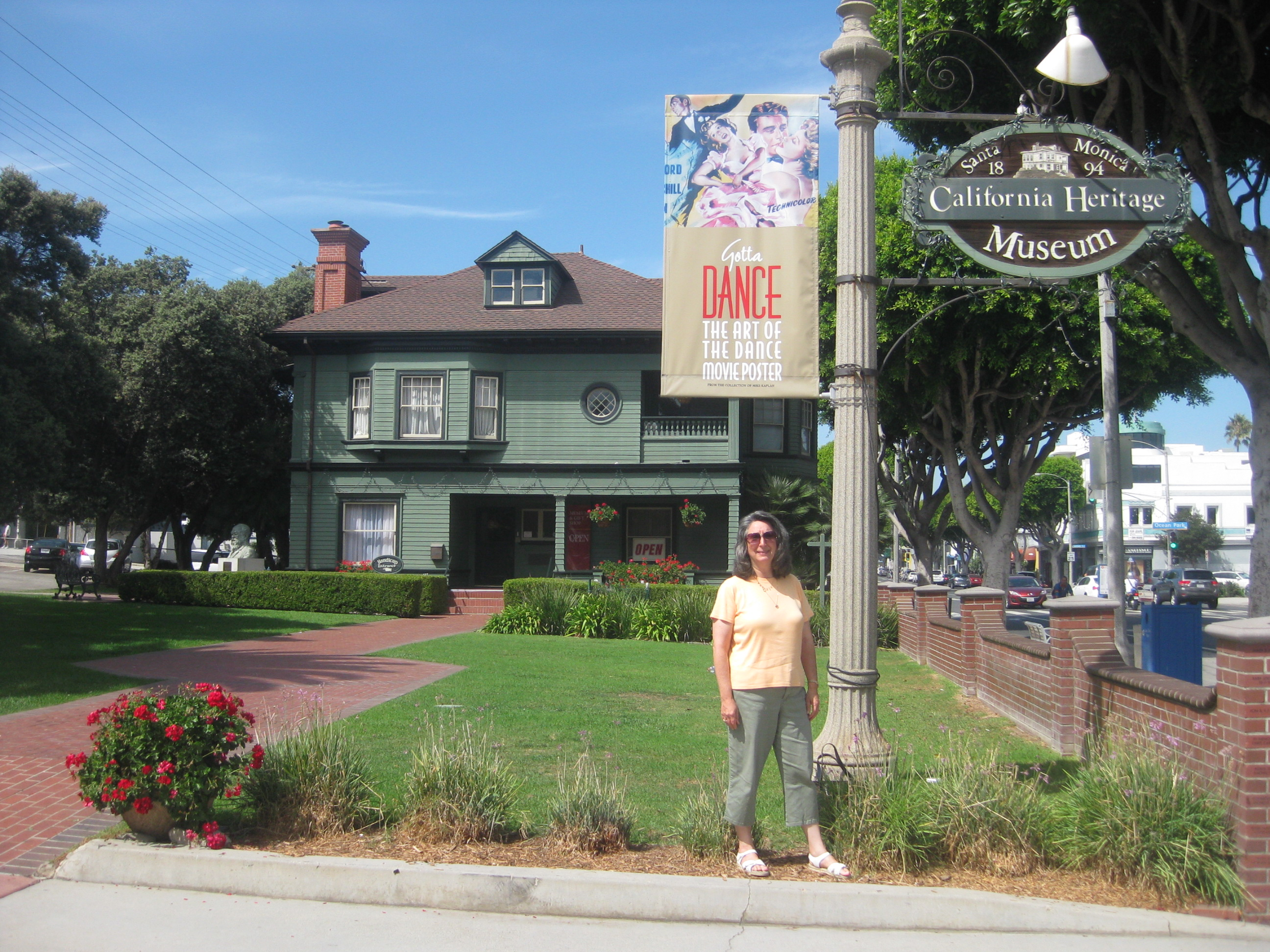
Front of the California Heritage Museum in Sept. 2012.

The property itself is a landmarked house known as the First Roy Jones House and it was moved to this location in 1977 from 1007 Ocean. The house was landmarked in 1979 and the museum opened a year later.

It was originally named the Santa Monica Heritage Museum and changed its name in the '90s tto the California Heritage Museum.

The museum has regular exhibits on subjects like surfing, skateboard, and Native American culture that highlight subject matters relevant to Santa Monica and California.

The property's ample parking lot and grounds are often used to participate and host community based events including a weekly food truck bazaar.

== First Roy Jones House, 1984 ==
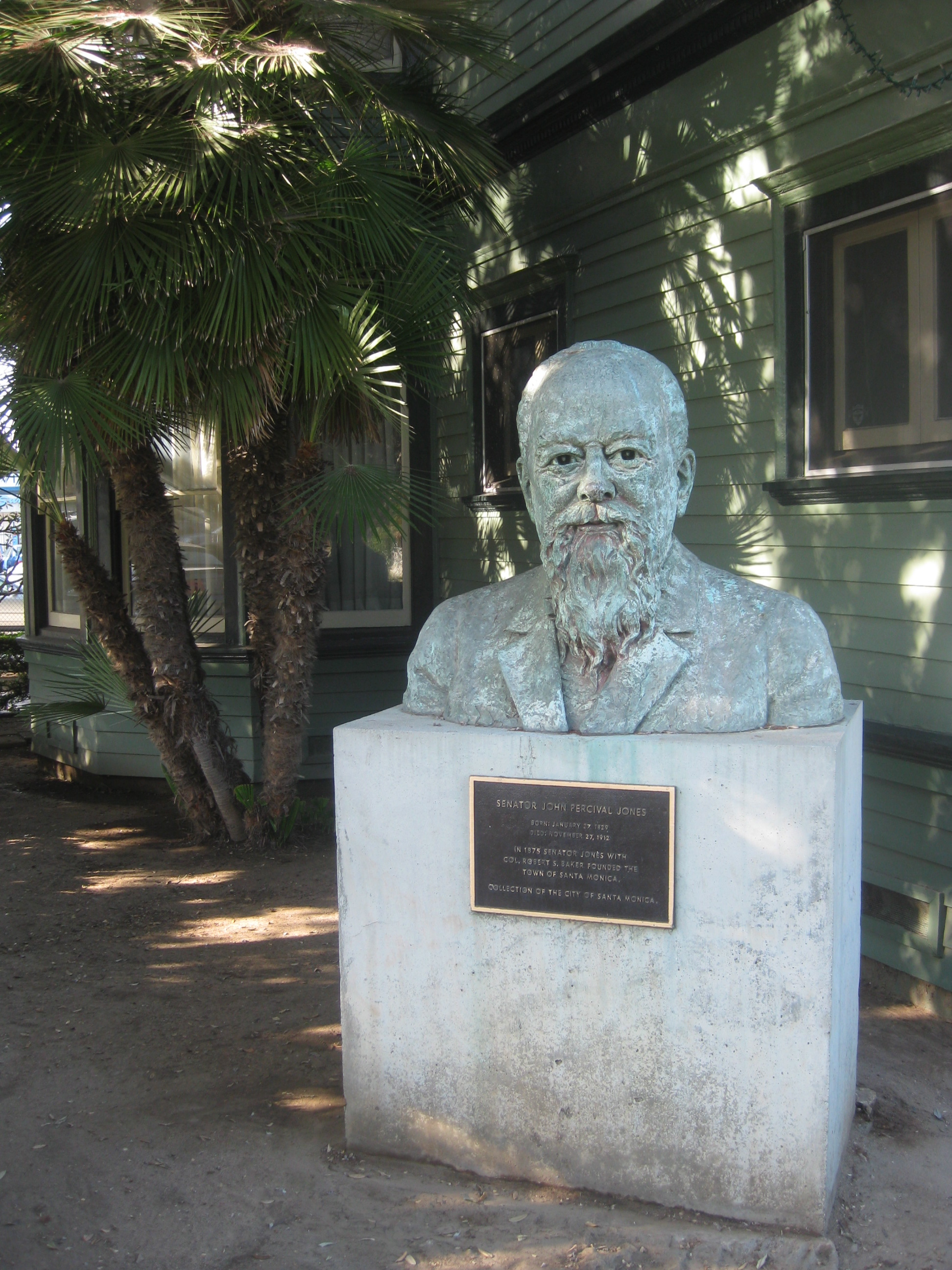
John Percival Jones bust on the Cal Heritage Museum property

Santa Monica was founded by Nevada Senator John Percival Jones in 1895. His son, Roy Jones became the Founder of the Bank of Santa Monica. Roy Jones was influential in the early development of the city and helped create the Ramina Corporation, one of the biggest early developers of California.

Architect Sumner P. Hunt was the architect chosen to build the house. The house originally cost between $3,000 - $5,000 and is the earliest known piece of American Colonial Revival style design of Sumner P. Hunt.

The building was officially landmarked in 1979, with the California Heritage Museum opening in 1980.

The house was originally located at 1007 Ocean and was moved to the current location by the Santa Monica Heritage Museum Foundation in 1977.

== Exhibits ==
In 2012, the museum hosted Gotta Dance: The Art of the Dance Movie Poster. In 2024, the Museum hosted an exhibit Dogtown and the Legendary Z-Boy, with original Z-Boy Nathan Pratt serving as guest curator. Pratt, with help from the Skateboarding Hall of Fame was able to collects boards, photographs and artwork representative of the time period where skateboarding was being discovered in Dogtown.
