= Michele Martin Taylor =

Fine art painter

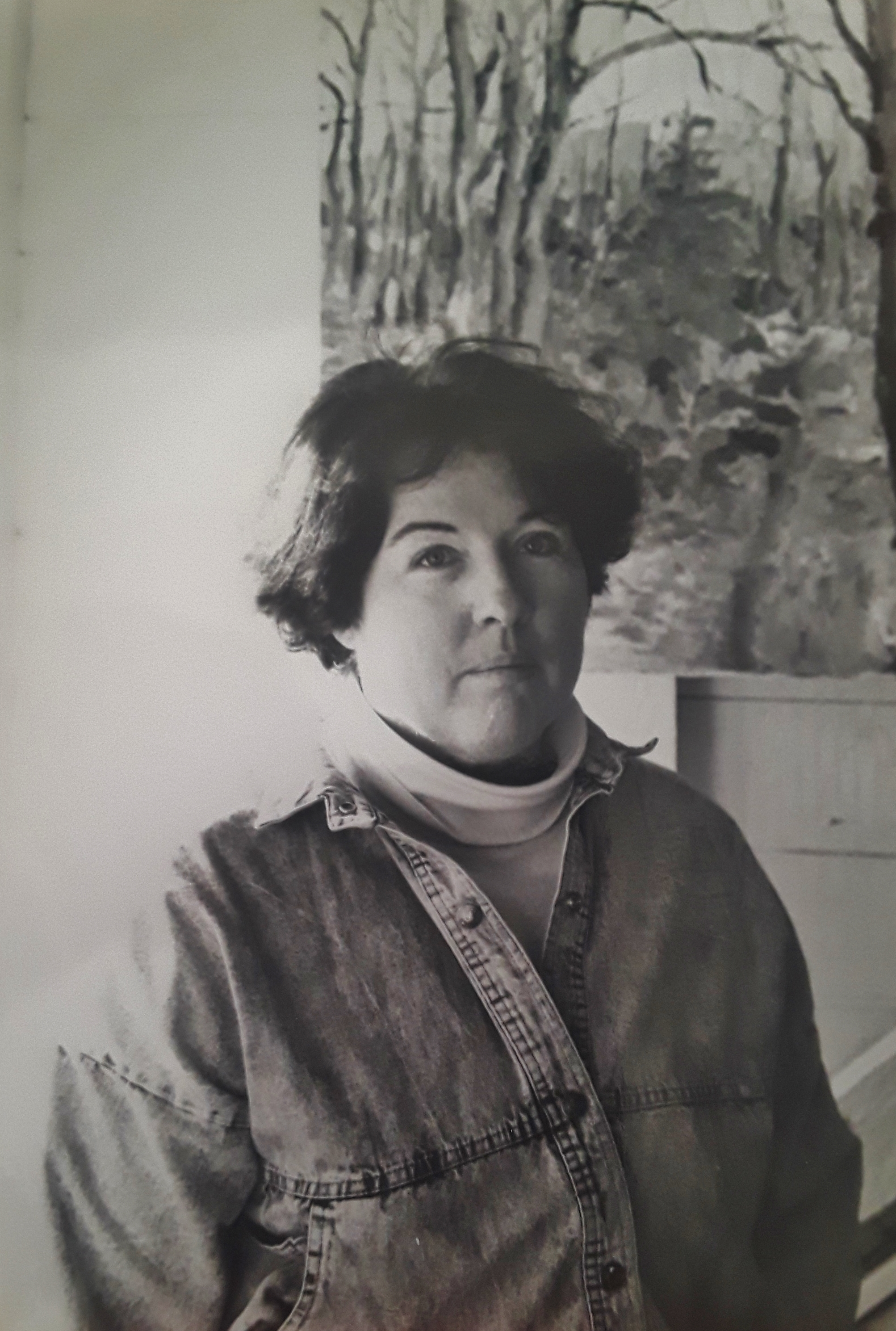
- Artist Michele Martin Taylor in her studio.
- Known for: Painter

Michele Martin Taylor (born Michele Francisca Martin in 1946 in Los Angeles, California), is an American fine art painter. She is best known for her Post-Impressionist works in oil, watercolor and intaglio. Her subjects are often gardens, water and verdure, but also portraits, figural studies and interiors.

== Biography and career ==
Taylor studied drawing and painting at the Chouinard Art Institute, Los Angeles California, California State University, Northridge, California. and Oregon State University, Corvallis, Oregon, where she received a Bachelor of Arts degree in fine art, painting and printmaking, and a Bachelor of Science degree in art education. During her formative academic years, she studied with Saul Bernstein, John Henry Rock, and Mark Sponenburgh In 1978, Taylor pursued post-graduate independent study in Paris, France, under Gordon Gilkey, with specific concentration on the works of post-impressionist Pierre Bonnard, focusing on the usage of colour.

During the 1980s, Michele Martin Taylor exhibited at regional American Northwest art museums, including the Portland Arts Museum, Oregon, (1982), Bellevue Arts Museum, Washington (1982), and Seattle Art Museum, Oregon (1984). During this period, she also exhibited her work at major Portland, Oregon art galleries, among them, The Lawrence Gallery and Fountain Gallery Exhibitions of paintings created during this period were noted in the Oregon press. Many of these achievements were chronicled in 1984 in her vetted listing in Who's Who in American Art (16th edition).

In the early 1990s, Taylor moved to Camp Hill, Pennsylvania, where she opened her own art gallery in Carlisle PA, and showed work there, in other national venues, and continuing to exhibit in Oregon. Her work was featured in Architectural Digest, and she was commissioned to paint the portrait of former Pennsylvania Lt. Governor Mark Singel to hang in the state Capitol.

In 1997, Michele Taylor established an art gallery, Taylor & Sons Fine Art, on Pennsylvania Avenue in Washington, D.C. There she exhibited her own and other mid-career artists’ works, and organized art related neighborhood events. She also undertook to mentor and develop emerging artists.

In 2002, Taylor, with artist Andrei Kushnir, opened an art gallery in Ellicott City, MD. She continued to exhibit her own works in one-artist exhibits at this venue. In 2004, Taylor and Kushnir opened a second art gallery in the East Village, Manhattan, where they exhibited their own works as well as other New York artists.

In 2007, Taylor exhibited new paintings in a one-artist show titled "A Quiet Life, Modern Post-Impressionist Paintings," at American Painting Fine Art, in Washington, DC. In 2008, Taylor was commissioned to paint the portraits of important Ukrainian Americans, which were included in an exhibit of notable persons of Ukrainian descent at the Ukraine House museum, in Kyiv, Ukraine. In 2010, Taylor exhibited new paintings of irises and lupines from Oregon's famed Schreiner's Iris Gardens in a show titled "A Painted Garden," at American Painting Fine Art, Washington, D.C.

== Exhibitions and collections ==
Taylor's work has been featured in the gallery and museum exhibitions throughout the United States, including in Portland, Oregon; Seattle, Washington; Los Angeles, California; Honolulu, Hawaii; New York, New York; Washington, D.C.; Boston, Massachusetts; and Harrisburg, Pennsylvania. Her paintings have also been exhibited in U.S. Embassies abroad, as well as in venues in Germany, France and the Netherlands.

Michele Martin Taylor's art has been widely received and is included in the collections of the Emperor and Empress of Japan, The Portland (Oregon) Art Museum, District of Columbia's Public Art Collection, the Mayo Clinic Foundation, The Marriott Corporation, and the private collection of Supreme Court Justice Sandra Day O'Connor. Over 1,200 of Michele's original works are included in public and private collections throughout the world. Her work is in the Yaquina River Museum of Art, Portland (Oregon) Art Museum, and City of Lake Oswego Art Collection, The Smithsonian Institution Libraries Collections database includes extensive files with Taylor's exhibition announcements, newspaper and/or magazine clippings, press releases, brochures, reviews, invitations, illustrations, resumes, artist's statements, and exhibition catalogs:

== Critical evaluation ==
In a review of one of Taylor's exhibitions, the art critic stated "[a] window into the soul, this seems the most appropriate characterization of the quiescent, almost ethereal work of painter Michele Taylor….Taylor's strong knowledge of the oil medium and skilful execution of impressionist canon meld beautifully and effectively with her sensitive consideration of mood and feeling. By doing so, she breathes new life into a form of painting much imitated and overblown by many contemporary artists."

== Recognition ==
In 1983 Taylor was honored by Oregon State University for outstanding achievement in the arts (one of four artists chosen between 1960 and 1983) as an Oregon State University Distinguished Alumni. Also in 1983, Schreiner's Iris Gardens, of Salem, Oregon, named a new hybrid iris "Michele Taylor" in honor of her iris garden paintings.

== Gallery ==
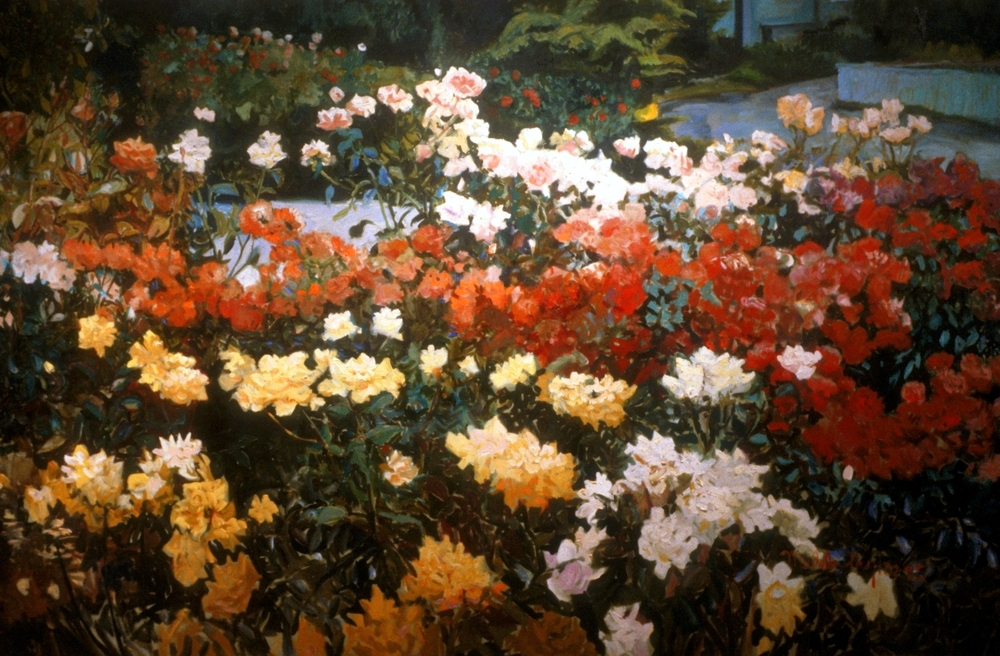
PDX Roses, 50" x 80" Oil on Canvas, Lattice Corp., Portland, Oregon

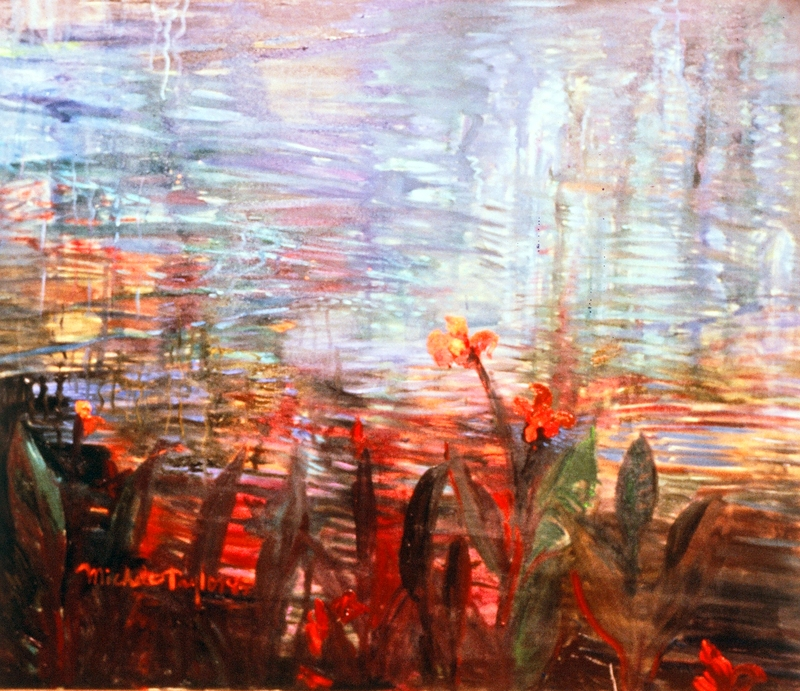
Cana Reflections, 50" x 60" Oil on Canvas, 1983, Weil, Gotshal and Manges

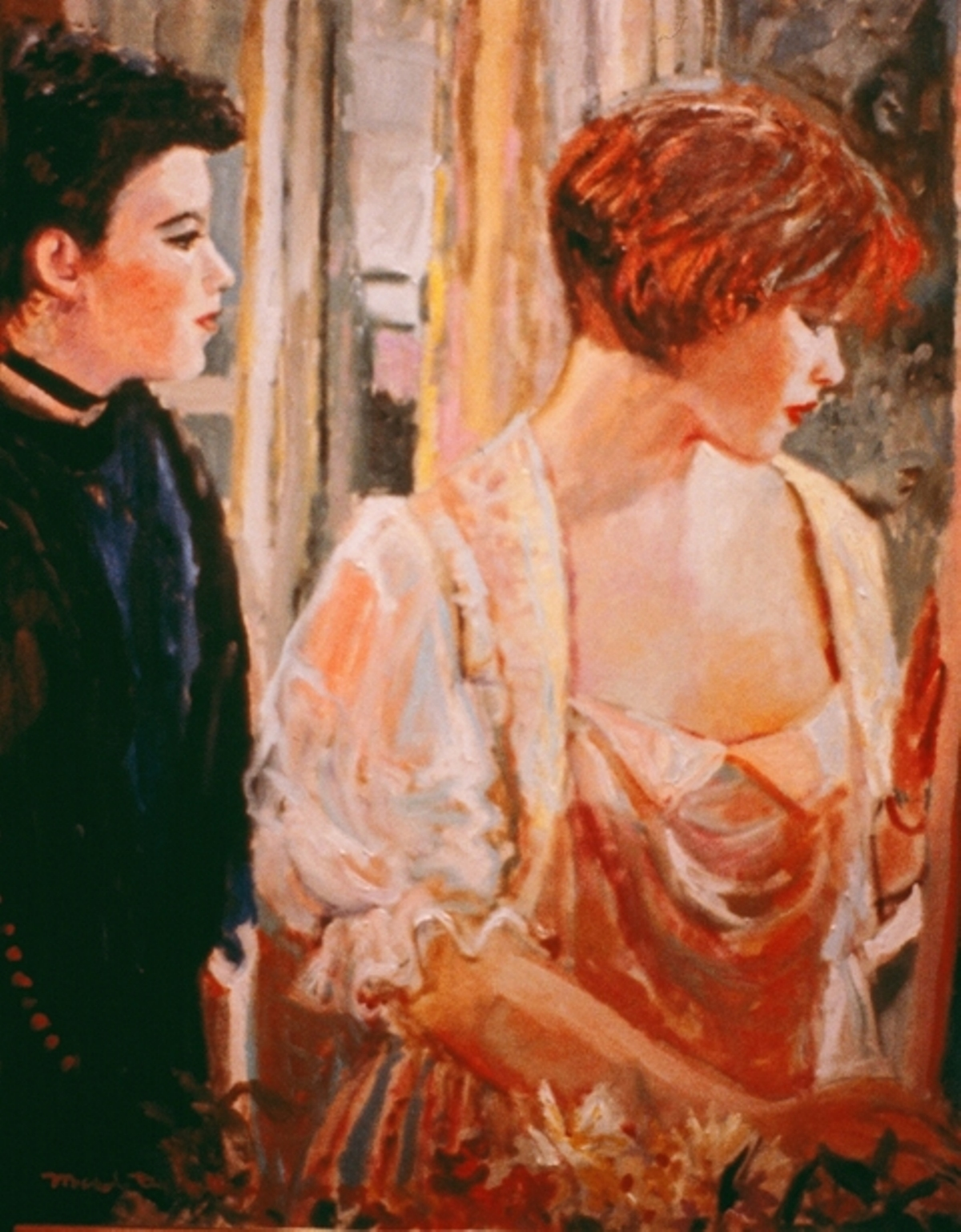
At the Window, the Cousins, 40" x 30" Oil on canvas, 1984, Private Collection

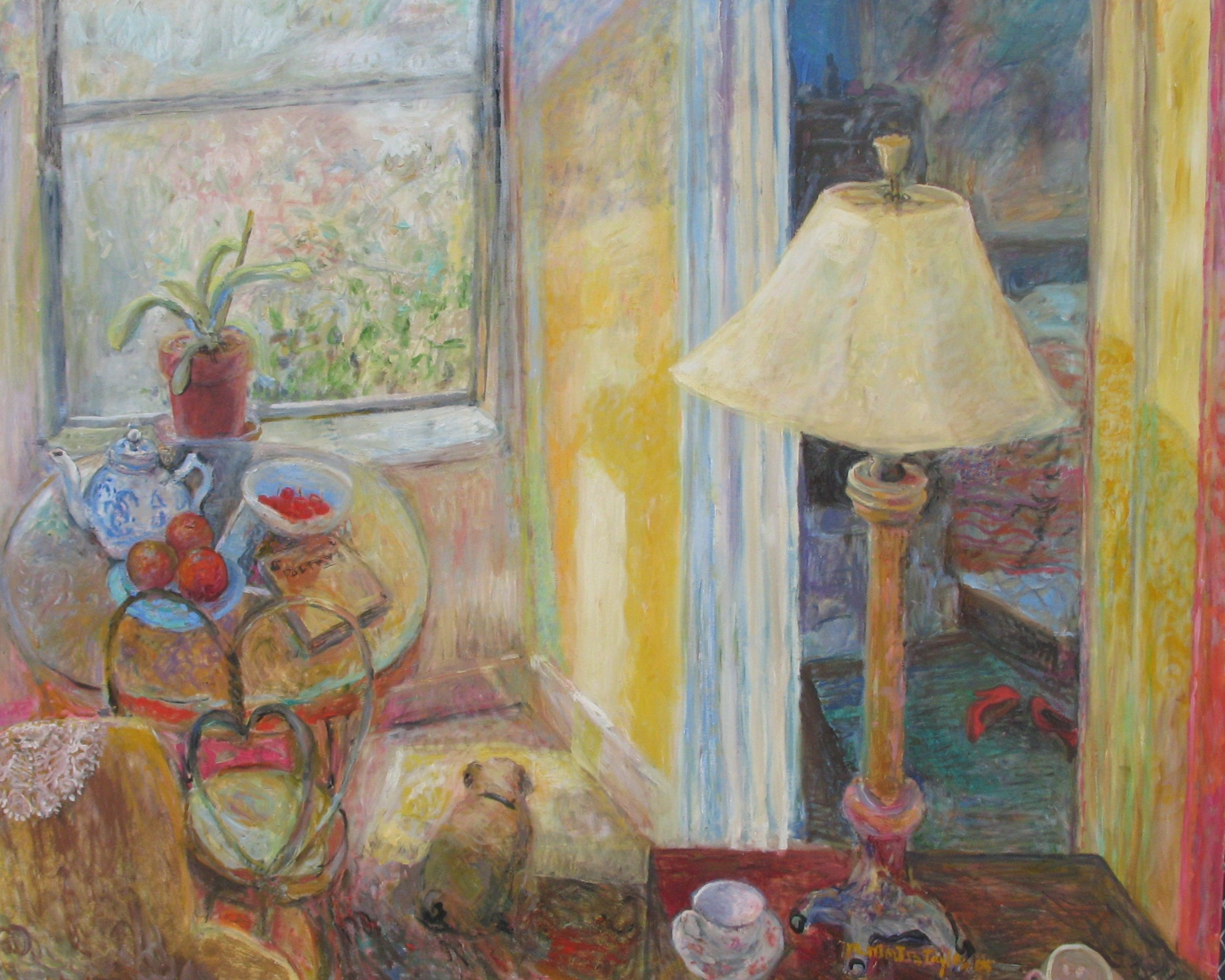
East Village Sunlight, 50" x 60" Oil on Canvas, 2008, Private Collection
