= Van Raalte =

Van Raalte is a Dutch surname.

People with the surname include:

- Albert van Raalte (1890–1952), Dutch conductor
- Albertus van Raalte (1811–1876), Dutch Reformed clergyman and founder of Holland, Michigan
- Dirk Van Raalte (1844–1910), American soldier and politician
- Henri Benedictus Van Raalte (1881–1929), English-born Australian artist and printmaker
- Herman van Raalte (1921–2013), Dutch football player
- Jan van Raalte (born 1968), Dutch football player and manager
- Noel van Raalte (1888–1940), British racing car driver

== See also ==
- Benjamin Van Raalte House, a historic building in Holland, Michigan
- Raalte, a town in the Dutch province of Overijssel
