= C. Edward Vosbury =

American architect

- Born: C. Edward Vosbury
- Occupation: Architect

C. Edward Vosbury was an architect in Binghamton, New York, noted for his design of mansions.

Vosbury was a native of Windsor, in Broome County, New York. He studied in New York City, Boston, and Paris. He "established a reputation for designing elegant and well-organized residences for wealthy Binghamtonians. Vosbury was the architect of many of the large houses in the Front Street-Riverside Drive area, Binghamton's most prestigious Edwardian neighborhood."

His works include:

- McKinnon House, Utica, 1899 (listed on the National Register of Historic Places)
- Roberson Mansion, 30 Front Street, Binghamton, 1904 (also an NRHP, said to be very similar to the McKinnon House)
