= Black Clock =

American literary magazine

- Discipline: Literary journal
- Language: English
- Edited by: Steve Erickson

Publication details
- History: 2004-2016
- Publisher: California Institute of the Arts (United States)
- Frequency: Semi-annual

Standard abbreviations
- ISO 4: Black Clock

Indexing
- ISSN: 1941-9465

Links
- Journal homepage

Black Clock was an American literary magazine that published twenty-one issues over twelve years. Edited by Steve Erickson, the magazine was "dedicated to fiction, poetry and creative essays that explore the frontier of constructive anarchy...Black Clock is audacious rather than safe, visceral rather than academic, intellectually engaging rather than antiseptically cerebral, and not above fun. Produced by writers for writers, Black Clock encourages risk and eschews editorial interference."

From its inception in 2004 until its demise in 2016, Black Clock featured work by Don DeLillo, Lydia Davis, David Foster Wallace, Jonathan Lethem, Richard Powers, Joanna Scott, Dana Spiotta, Rick Moody, Maggie Nelson, Greil Marcus, Samuel R. Delany, Miranda July, Geoff Dyer, Brian Evenson, Darcey Steinke, Lynne Tillman, Michael Ventura, Mark Z. Danielewski and William T. Vollmann among others. Work appearing in Black Clock was anthologized in best-of-the-year collections and nominated for O. Henry and Pushcart prizes, and two excerpted novels went on to win National Book Awards.

Issue	Season	Contributors
1	Summer 2004	Wearing Not My Veil, Arielle Greenberg; Modernhaus Projekt-H, 1933 (Unbuilt), Peter Gadol; Rules For Flagellants, Rick Moody; The Eternal Helen, Heidi Julavits; Rain On Concrete, Joanna Scott; Tsunami, Bradford Morrow; 'T Zuid, Nicholas Royle; A Conversation, Samuel R. Delany; Charting The Sensual And Cerebral Worlds, Or A Samuel R. Delany Pantheon, Anthony Miller; Dark Afterthoughts On Fiction And The Self, Rebecca Goldstein; Debbieland, Aimee Bender; Toyota Widow, Mary Caponegro; And The Word Was, Bruce Bauman; Oblivion, David Foster Wallace; The National Anthem, Jonathan Lethem; Private, I, Arielle Greenberg.
2	Fall 2004/ Winter 2004	Mariana's Song, Heather Miles; Masked Marauders, Greil Marcus; Perfidia, Lewis Shiner; Damballah Rising, Michael Ventura; The Magnetic Field, David Toop; Revolution Blues, Andrew Hultkrans; Another Lost Angel (Is This Thing On?), Samantha Dunn; Otis Redding's Lonely Hearts Club Band, Jonathan Lethem; The White Albums, Heidi Julavits; Zimmerman's Last Dream, Bruce Bauman; The Fear Of God Sessions, Rick Moody; Direction (While Listening To Bob Dylan's Desire), Heather Miles; The Dust Blows Forward 'N' Sand Blows Back, Geoff Nicholson; Here Is The Church, Shelley Jackson; Crashing, Chris Roberts; There But For Grace Is God, Sean Howe; Later, Lynne Tillman; Bon Scott: The Choir Years, Brian Evenson; The Young Untold, Miranda July; John Cage's Secret Halls And The Human Beat Box, Ben Marcus; Aurochs And Angels, Arion Berger; Boulevard Of Broken Dreams, David L. Ulin; Bones Of The Back, Darcey Steinke; Unmasked Marauders, Greil Marcus; Critical Karaoke, Ange Mlinko, Greil Marcus, Daphne Brooks, Joshua Clover, Oliver Wang and Ann Powers; Paul Is Dead, Steve Erickson; The City of the Dead Girl, Emily White.
3	Spring 2005/ Summer 2005	Everyone In The Room Is A Representative Of The World At Large (The Siamese Sextuplets), Catherine Wagner; Cranes, Richard Powers; Milk, Darcey Steinke; Searching For Emily, Lee Montgomery; Jumper Cables (Back Story): The Marigolds, Ron Loewinsohn; Endangered, Rachel Resnick; Girl In A Blue Chair, Maureen Howard; Celestial Militia, Larissa Szporluk; Terra Pax, Joanna Scott; Some Language, Some Nudity, Geoff Nicholson; Operation Hagen, William T. Vollmann; ___________-American, Jose Felipe Alvergue; The Girl And The Fire And The Buick, 1954, Randy Michael Signor; The Shadow Upon Us, Russell Swenson; Redeemed En Route, Ben Ehrenreich; Annals In Plagiary, Joseph McElroy; Impending And Oncoming, Heather Miles; The Third River, Emily White; Alien Encounter, Janet Sarbanes; The Orange Eats Creeps, Grace Krilanovich; The Other Mary, Michael Ventura; Everyone In The Room Is A Representative Of The World At Large, Catherine Wagner.
4	Fall 2005/ Winter 2006	Floating Wick In Petrol, Rachel Zucker; From The Vaults, Richard Meier; Guilty Pleasures And Lost Causes, Steve Erickson; A Strange Up-Flinging, Michael Ventura; Prog Rock Confessional, Rick Moody; An Orchestra Of Light That Was Electric, Jonathan Lethem; Humiliation, Tom Lutz; The Futile Charm Of The Bob-Oisie, Glen David Gold; The Friday Nights Of Terry Melcher, Sean Howe; Remembering Andrea Dworkin, Joanna Scott; Hot Pussy And The Cool Of The Innocent, Albert Mobilio; A Memory Of Columbo, Geoffrey O'Brien; Woman In The Distance, Don DeLillo; The Powell Divide, Geoff Nicholson; The Cake, Chris Roberts; Hurdy Gurdy Man, Steve Erickson; An Enthusiasm (Grentheos, Possessed By A God), Mady Schutzman; The Vidiot, Jon Wagner and Tracy Biga MacLean; Narrative, After Buñuel, Janet Sternburg; This Corrosion, Howard Hampton; Damn It, I'm A Doctor, Anthony Miller; Kabloona, Kenneth Turan; Broken Seashells, Ron Drummond; How Can I Tell You, Arion Berger; The Imaginary War, Grace Krilanovich; Reptile Pleasures, Joy Nicholson; The Nine Billion Songs Of Pop, Eric Weisbard; A Made Man, David L. Ulin; Shame, Robert Polito; Sudor, Samantha Dunn; Joe Meek And The Twelfth Of August 1966, Jon Savage; Without A Trace, Howard A. Rodman; On A Realization: Music, David Toop; Monogamist, Rachel Zucker; Looking At The Law, Richard Meier.
5	Spring 2006/ Summer 2006	Below The Line, Dwayne Moser; For Guadalupe (And For Michael): One, Hannah Bleier; Theseus At Los Angeles, Yxta Maya Murray; My Cruel Summer, Joy Nicholson; Modus Operandi, Lisa Teasley; Good Life, Howard A. Rodman; The Victor Muet Mansion, 6601 Callia Lily Canyon Road, Brentwood: A Brief History, Tom Carson; Off Ramp, A.J. Albany; The People Upstairs, Jenna Blough; Touching Tables, Lynell George; Monster Eyes, Jonathan Lethem; Alt.Country, Alan Rifkin; Broken Sleep, Bruce Bauman; Cowboys, Todd Collins; The Moon Reaches Down For Me Like The Fist In A Siquieros Painting, Lou Mathews; Her Royal Highness, Susan Straight; Nicola, Jenny Burman; Mr. Peanorse And The Nice Family, Benjamin Weissman; Sway, Rachel Resnick; Los Angeles By Gaslight, Carlos Ruiz Zafón; Welcome To Esplandian, David Martino; American Modern, Peter Gadol; Writing About LA And Why I Failed, Mary Yukari Waters; In Her Own Words, Francesca Lia Block.
6	Fall 2006/ Winter 2007	Too Little, Michael Burkard; Interview Nineteen: A Very Small Casket, Kristin Aardsma; Paradoxes From Leona's/I Love You To Death E Pluribus Unum, Lindsay Bell; Off Into The Sea/The Waste Land, Aaron Belz; Dear Inaudible, Laynie Browne; The Sun Is Shattering/The Found Face Girl, Michael Burkard; Trapeze Act/Can You Die Of Eating Pancakes, Mairéad Byrne; Moon River Anthology, Tom Carson; Thanksgiving/The Decorating Issue, Shana Cleveland; A Heap Of Triangles, John Colasacco; Postcard To December/Postcard To Assonance, Sean Cole; Dear Twin Falls — (1)/Dear Twin Falls — (2), Ryan Collins; The Magic Mountain, John Steven Cummins; Threnodies, Robert Eisele; Diminishing Emergence, D. G. Eng; The Third One, Monica Ferrell; Dusk, Annie Finch; Spilt From / Split Form Of Teaching "Tintern Abbey" (2 Poems), Lisa Fishman; Three Grotesques, Richard Foerster; Echo Light, Kate Gale; Cinderelly, Lara Glenum; Scrape Grace, Johannes Gorransson; I Step Into My Thoughts Of Death/Deer Sonnets, Chris Green; The Girl With The Map To The Stars/Traif, Arielle Greenberg; Sappho's Fragments, Eloise Klein Healy; Once More, This Time With Feeling..., Jen Hofer; Instrumental, Karen Holden; Fablesque, Anna Maria Hong; We Are Walking Into The Sunset, Joy Katz; Goth Plaint, Caroline Knox; Faust's Dog/Urinals, Wayne Koestenbaum; Truth #73, Sue Kurek; Insects, Vermin, Pests, Patrick Lawler; Haven't You, Haven't You/Bad Dream, Lyn Lifshin; [And He Sees Me Fostered, Forced.], Maggie Lopez; From "So I Began", Lisa Lubasch; 64, Sarah Manguso; From Tsim Tsum, Sabrina Orah Mark; With The Moon, Heather McHugh; Innocuous/The Nature Of New Noises, Heather Miles; Eruch Jessawala Says, Stephen Paul Miller; Art Hotels And The Global Café, Ange Mlinko; Emergency Ruin, Albert Mobilio; Swimmeret, Caroline Morrell; Hope Of Understanding, Thomas Mowe; Insomniac, Brighde Mullins; Blue Poems, Maggie Nelson; Wherein A Surrogate's Amelioration/Wherein A Surrogate's Fruition 2, Danielle Pafunda; Dreams Involving Euthanasia, Lisa Pepper; Confidential/Paris Hilton Calls On Jesus, Robert Polito; Sense, Kristin Prevallet; From The World, Srikanth Reddy; Red, Stephanie Rioux; Poem For The Brooklyn Bridge, Matthew Rohrer; Stoic Wreck, James Shea; Poem With A Line From James Dickey Near The End, Martha Silano; Dear Bruce Springsteen,, Laurel Snyder; Song Of Tom, Janet Sternburg; Scholar/Where Geography Stops,, Stephanie Strickland; Soapsuds Slid Off, Novica Tadić; One Story And A Slap/O Give Me A Home, Karen Tepfer; Slavic Skin., Steven Teref; Turning As A Kind Of Shouting, Tom Thompson; Buell Wesley Frazier, Tony Trigilio; James Schuyler/To Tim Dlugos, David Trinidad; The Door Is Fallen Down, Jean Valentine; Christine, Kathrine Varnes; From Working Stiffs, Michael Ventura; For Alan Dugan, Rebecca Wolff; Before Your Death, Jean Valentine.
7	Spring 2007/ Summer 2007	On Typing (After Rachel Zucker's "Sunday Morning"), Arielle Greenberg; More Sex, Lynne Tillman; Blindfold, Matias Viegener; A Girl Called Casanova, Yxta Maya Murray; On A Saturday Afternoon, Aimee Bender; My Mother, Marie Christ (b. Hope Springs, TN, 1951 - d. Memphis, July 4, 1985), Tom Carson; Ice Cream, Sandi Tan; Howlin' With The Woofdog, Wanda Coleman; Room 721, Janet Fitch; Late Blooming, Lisa Teasley; Durga Rising, John Mandel; Respect, Seth Greenland; Manson Girl, Joy Nicholson; Warlock, Grace Krilanovich; Evening At The Cryo-Crystal Circus Hotel, Rachel Resnick; Sex And The Spirits, Francesca Lia Block; Your Filthy Mouth/What Not To Say When Asked Why You Are A Lesbian, Danielle Aquiline; Here I Come, Arielle Greenberg; Apology, Tara Ison; Pretending, John Haskell; Invisible Box, Brian Evenson; Gothic, Arion Berger; Billy Jean And Connie Cheaters, Todd Collins; In The Valley Of The Nest Of Spiders, Samuel R. Delany; Responsible Hedonism, Janet Sarbanes; Menagerie, Margaret Wappler; Index For A Lost Autobiography, Geoff Nicholson; Sunday Morning, Rachel Zucker.
8		City Center, Nolan Chessman; Mook, Michael Ventura; A Walk Around The World, Geoff Nicholson; The Dark Ride, Alex Austin; I Once Was Lost, Mady Schutzman; The Best England Ever, Yxta Maya Murray; The Messenger (The Crossing), Geoffrey O'Brien; What Happened Was, Chris Kraus; Heathen, Lisa Teasley; Katmandu, Tom Carson; Keep The Change, Lynda Leidiger; Bad Science, Mark Bibbins; Lillian Lakes Loop, Rosemary Griggs; Piercings, Mary Miller; Wonderland, Lewis Shiner; The Buchanan Museum, George Melrod; Pursuit Of Happiness, Gregory Hayes; Night In Ypsilanti, Christine Hume; Berserkers, Arion Berger; The Messengers (This Will Never Return), Geoffrey O'Brien; Archaeology, Susan Straight; Big Pickle, Randy Michael Signor; The Sting Of Irrelevancy, Joanna Scott; The Turtles Swarmed Beneath Me, And Everything Was Green, Nolan Chessman.

== See also ==
- List of literary magazines
