= David Lazar (author) =

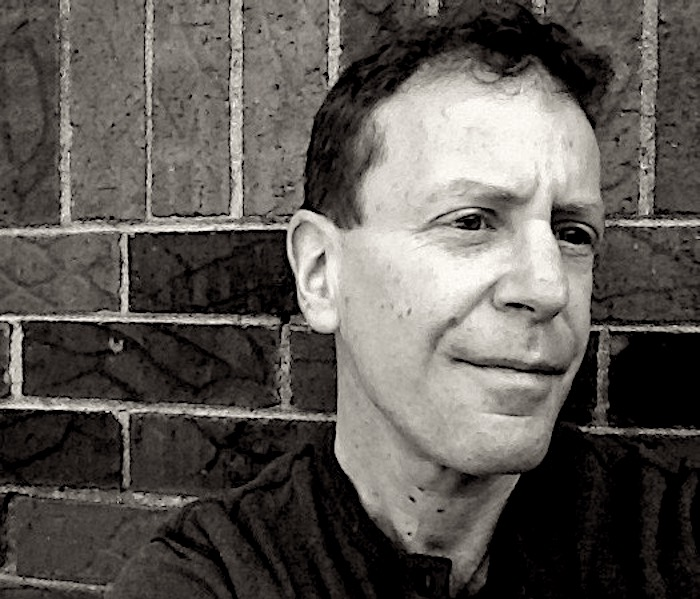
- Born: January 28, 1957 (age 69); Brooklyn, New York
- Education: Bennington College, Syracuse University, Stanford University, University of Houston
- Occupations: Essayist, editor, and professor
- Writing career
- Literary movement: Creative Nonfiction
- Website: lazar.org

David Lazar (born January 28, 1957) is an American writer and editor, primarily known as an essayist. Born in Brooklyn, NY, he has been involved in the development of "creative nonfiction" in the United States, creating graduate programs, writing theoretically about the essay, and mentoring and publishing many subsequent writers of note.

== Early life ==
Lazar was born in Brooklyn, New York to Leo Lazar (Lazarowitz) and Rhoda Lazar (née Statlend) and went to public schools, graduating from Abraham Lincoln High School in Brooklyn. He graduated from Bennington College, and completed master's degrees at Stanford University and Syracuse University, before finishing his PhD in Creative Writing and Literature at the University of Houston in 1989, with, according to Phillip Lopate, the first doctorate in nonfiction writing in the U.S.

== Career ==
In 1990, at Ohio University, where Lazar taught for sixteen years as an Assistant, Associate, then Full Professor, he established the nonfiction writing programs at the undergraduate, M.A. and PhD levels, one of the few doctoral programs in nonfiction writing in the U.S. at the time. He also became, for eight years, Associate Editor of the Ohio Review, editing the special issue On Mentorship. When the Ohio Review was shuttered, he founded the literary magazine Hotel Amerika in 2001, which continues toward its twentieth year. In addition to inclusions in Best American Essays, Best American Poetry, Best American Short Stories and the Pushcart Anthology, Hotel Amerika has published special issues devoted to Transgenre literature, published in 2009, the Aphorisms issue, and its Epistolary issue. Lazar is also the co-editor, with Patrick Madden, of 21st Century Essays, a book series published by Ohio State University Press focused entirely on the essay, the only such series in the U.S. Titles in the series have included works by Phillip Lopate, Nicole Walker, Nicholas Delbanco, Catherine Wagner, Sophfronia Scott, Lina Ferreira, Paul Crenshaw, Chris Arthur, and many others. In 2006, Lazar began teaching at Columbia College Chicago, where he is currently Professor of Creative Writing. He created the MFA and undergraduate programs in nonfiction writing at Columbia College.

== Publications ==
David Lazar has published four books of essays: Celeste Holm Syndrom (2020, University of Nebraska Press), The Body of Brooklyn (2003, University of Iowa Press), Occasional Desire: Essays (2013, University of Nebraska Press) and I'll Be Your Mirror: Essays and Aphorisms (2017, University of Nebraska Press). His books of prose poetry include Powder Town (2008, Pecan Grove Press) and Who's Afraid of Helen of Troy (2016, Etruscan Press). Forthcoming from University of Nebraska Press are Stories of the Street, prose poems and mini-essays with photographs of found texts, and Double Indemnities, epistolary essays in collaboration with women writers.

As editor, he has published four highly regarded nonfiction anthologies: Don't Look Back (Ohio State University Press, 2020),Truth in Nonfiction (2008, University of Iowa Press), Essaying the Essay (2013, Welcome Table Press), and, with Patrick Madden as co-editor, After Montaigne: Contemporary Essayists Cover the Essays (2014, University of Georgia Press), which won the Independent Publishers and Foreword Indiefab Book of the Year awards for the essay. With Kristen Iversen, he has edited Don't Look Now: Things We Wish We Hadn't Seen, essays by writers on what they wish they hadn't seen, to be published by Ohio State University Press.

Lazar has published his essays and prose poetry in the forthcoming Cambridge History of the American Essay,The Southwest Review, Black Clock, Gulf Coast, North Dakota Quarterly, Denver Quarterly, River Teeth, Essay Daily, The Normal School, The Bellingham Review and many anthologies, including Bending Genre, The Science of Story, Like Thunder: American Poets Respond to Violence, Short Flights 2, After Montaigne, etc.

Lazar's work was included in The Contemporary American Essay, edited by Phillip Lopate.

== Awards ==
- Lazar was awarded a John Simon Guggenheim Fellowship in General Nonfiction for 2015.
- His essays have been named "Notable Essays of the Year" ten times by Best American Essays.
- He was awarded an Individual Artist Fellowship by the State of Ohio.
- At Ohio University, he was named Outstanding Professor in the College of Liberal Arts.
- In 2021, he was long listed for the PEN Diamonstein Spielvogel Award, along with Barbara Ehrenreich, Vivian Gornick, Lucy Sante and Wayne Koestenbaum.
