= Mantis (Marvel Comics) =

Marvel Comics fictional character

- Mantis; Art by Tom Raney

Publication information
- Publisher: Marvel Comics
- First appearance: The Avengers #112 (June 1973)
- Created by: Steve Englehart (writer); Don Heck (artist)

In-story information
- Species: Human mutate
- Team affiliations: Guardians of the Galaxy; Avengers; Knowhere Corps
- Partnerships: Swordsman; Kang the Conqueror; Vision
- Notable aliases: Willow; Lorelei; Mandy Celestine; Celestial Madonna
- Abilities: Regenerative healing factor; Energy projection; Astral projection; Chlorokinesis; Precognition; Pyrokinesis; Empathy; Expert martial artist

Mantis is a character appearing in American comic books published by Marvel Comics. Created by writer Steve Englehart and artist Don Heck, the character first appeared in The Avengers #112 (June 1973). Mantis has been depicted as a member of the Avengers and the Guardians of the Galaxy, as well as the mother of Sequoia.

Pom Klementieff portrayed the character in the Marvel Cinematic Universe in the Marvel Cinematic Universe films Guardians of the Galaxy Vol. 2 (2017), Avengers: Infinity War (2018), Avengers: Endgame (2019), Thor: Love and Thunder (2022), The Guardians of the Galaxy Holiday Special (2022), and Guardians of the Galaxy Vol. 3 (2023). The character has also appeared in the animated series Guardians of the Galaxy, where she was voiced by Jennifer Hale, and several video games.

== Creation ==
In an interview, Englehart commented on the character's creation: "I wanted someone to shake up the Avengers, so I came up with a femme fatale, but right after I did, I also came up with the Avengers-Defenders Clash, and I needed to use my femme as a solid team player, not a disrupter. I found that interesting – a character I'd created for a purpose who now had no purpose, and as a young writer exploring my parameters, I started letting her tell her own story – meaning, every issue I'd tell my overall Avengers story, with my various character developments, and things then would happen that she had to react to. Those reactions – or what I conceived her reactions to be – revealed her character for me, step-by-step, as the worlds I was definitely creating grew bigger and bigger, and in that way the femme fatale became the Celestial Madonna."

In the book Marvel Comics: The Untold Story by Sean Howe, Englehart described how Mantis was introduced to force her male teammates to act as adults.

She was introduced to be a slut. I've always been a big fan of sex, and I would see these grown-up super-hero guys fight super-villains, then they'd meet a woman, they'd blush and stammer. They were like big teenage boys, which always seemed dumb to me, because I was accepting them as grown-up men, so why didn't they act like grown-up men?

— Steve Englehart, in Sean Howe, Marvel Comics: The Untold Story, part 2, chapter 6

== Publication history ==
Mantis first appeared in The Avengers #112 (June 1973), drawn by Don Heck and created by writer Steve Englehart, beginning the "Celestial Madonna" saga. After leaving Marvel Comics, Englehart carried Mantis's tale through three other companies: moving from Marvel to DC to Eclipse to Image and finally back to Marvel.

In DC Comics' Justice League of America #142, she appears as Willow. Asked where she came from, Willow replies, "This one has come from a place she must not name, to reach a place no man must know." (Mantis refers to herself in the third person as "this one") By the end of the issue, she leaves to give birth.

In the Eclipse Comics series Scorpio Rose #2, the character calls herself Lorelei. By this time, she has given birth to a son. What would have been issue #3, a "lost" Lorelei/Scorpio Rose story was later published in Coyote Collection #1 from Image Comics, the character's fourth company. Lorelei is later mentioned in Englehart's 2010 novel The Long Man (page 355, mass market paperback edition).

== Fictional character biography ==
Mantis is the half-Vietnamese, half-German daughter of Gustav Brandt (Libra) and was born in Huế, Vietnam. In her childhood, her father leaves her in Vietnam at the Temple of the alien Priests of Pama, a sect of the Kree. The Kree believe that Mantis may become the Celestial Madonna and mate with the eldest Cotati on Earth to become the mother of the Celestial Messiah Sequoia, "the most important being in the universe".

Mantis excels in her martial arts studies, but upon reaching adulthood, she is mind-wiped and sent into the world to gain life experience. She becomes a sex worker and barmaid in a Vietnamese tavern, where she meets Swordsman. She helps him regain his self-respect and follows him when the former villain attempts to rejoin the Avengers. She becomes an ally of the Avengers when the Swordsman rejoins the group.

With the Avengers, Mantis has many adventures. She battles the original Zodiac, and learns that Libra is her father and that she was raised by the Priests of Pama. Mantis becomes taken with Vision, and—although rejected by the android—neglects Swordsman. Alongside the Scarlet Witch and Agatha Harkness, she was abducted by Kang. She was revealed as the Celestial Madonna and witnessed the death of the Swordsman at the hands of Kang, only realizing the depth of her love for the Swordsman after he dies. Mantis then formally joins the Avengers and is revealed to be the Celestial Madonna. She marries a Cotati inhabiting the reanimated body of Swordsman, leaving the Avengers and the Earth to mate with him.

After she bears her child Sequoia, she takes the name "Mandy Celestine" and lives with him for a year in Willimantic, Connecticut before leaving him to the Cotati and leaving for space with the Silver Surfer. The Silver Surfer falls in love with Mantis. Mantis developed green skin and increased durability during her pregnancy; she grows bitter with her life and the way she was forced to abandon her child. This comes to a head when Mantis is caught in an explosion and presumed dead by Silver Surfer. She survives, but splits into multiple versions of herself, representing conflicting aspects of her psyche that could no longer co-exist inside her mind.

Aside from mentions by Silver Surfer, Mantis does not reappear until the 1995 storyline "The Crossing". In "The Crossing", Mantis returns as the villainous bride of Kang the Conqueror with the intention of bringing death to the Avengers, her father Libra, and her Cotati husband. The storyline was controversial, so much so that Kurt Busiek, in Avengers Forever limited series, retconned the Mantis who appeared in the story as being a Space Phantom imposter.

Mantis in action, taking on a larger, stronger foe with characteristic bravado and self-narration. Art by Sal Buscema and Joe Staton.

Eventually, Mantis reappears in the Steve Englehart written Avengers: Celestial Quest limited series. She returns to Earth and merges with her remaining fragmented portions of her personality after the first four are killed by a clone of Thanos. The final Mantis merges with them to become a "complete" Mantis for the first time since her dispersion. Thus reformed, she and a group of the Avengers go into space to stop "Thanos" from killing her son, Quoi, who by this time is a rebellious teenager desperate to leave the isolation of the Cotati home-world and travel the stars.

After the defeat of Ultron and the Phalanx, Mantis takes up residence on Knowhere with the rest of the Guardians of the Galaxy, and becomes their counselor.

During the Secret Invasion storyline, it was discovered that Star-Lord had Mantis use her mental powers to manipulate the members of the Guardians of the Galaxy to join the team against their will. Overhearing Mantis and Star-Lord converse about their deception, Drax shares this knowledge with the rest of the team, causing most of them to leave. Mantis is promoted to field status by Rocket Raccoon.

Mantis rescues Peter Quill from a group of pursuing Spartax soldiers. Though she refuses to join his new incarnation of the Guardians, she helps him track down the source of mysterious "time quakes" that have been plaguing him in the wake of the Age of Ultron storyline.

During the "Empyre" storyline, Mantis returns to Earth upon being contacted by Black Panther about the Cotati invasion and plans to reason with her son.

== Characterization ==
=== Powers and abilities ===
Mantis has attained a mastery of meditational disciplines, giving her an unusual amount of control over her body, including autonomic functions like heartbeat, bleeding, and breathing, as well as awareness of pain, allowing her to more quickly heal injuries through sheer force of will and affording almost superhuman reflexes and reactions. She also had psychic empathy, a telepathic power that allowed her to sense the emotions of others.

Mantis gained additional abilities as a result of communion with the Prime Cotati. Her empathic ability enabled her to communicate with the plant-like Cotati and with plant life. She has the power of astral projection. Mantis had the ability to separate her physical and astral forms, projecting her consciousness from her body, allowing her to travel interplanetary distances. She also had the ability to transfer her astral form to any place where plant life exists. She could form and inhabit a plant-like simulacrum of her human body for herself out of the destination planet's local vegetation. Her fighting skills remained intact, and her empathic abilities were heightened to a superhuman degree and extended to the planet's flora and biosphere. She could control the vegetation within her vicinity.

During her confrontations with a powerful Thanos clone, she displayed superhuman strength, a talent to simultaneously inhabit multiple simulacra, and the ability to project strong blasts of energy. She has not been seen using these powers since.

As of her appearance in Annihilation Conquest: Star-Lord, Mantis also appears to have gained telepathic and precognitive abilities, and apparently now labors under a constant awareness of future events. During the series, Mantis displayed pyrokinesis. She can remain invisible to the Phalanx and extend her power to cloak others.

Additionally, Mantis was trained by the Priests of Pama to become a grandmistress of the martial arts, demonstrated as capable of defeating opponents as skilled as Captain America (although he was distracted while fighting a dragon). She could also instinctively sense weak points in an opponent and with her skills in pressure points, knock out beings as powerful as the thunder god, Thor.

=== Personality ===
In her first appearances, Mantis represents the "Dragon Lady" archetype, that of a mysterious Eastern seductress whose sexuality causes tension among the male Avengers. She is assertive and confident in her powers, and while she appeared somewhat arrogant at first (as illustrated by her breakup with Swordsman when she chose Vision over him), she renounced her pride after Swordsman's tragic death. Mantis is highly intelligent, with her deductive skills rivaling those of Vision's; in Vision's own words, she has a "remarkable mind".

She almost always refers to herself in the third person as "this one", "she", and occasionally "Mantis", which has to do with her upbringing at the Temple of the Priests of Pama (her husband the Cotati Elder, who spent a significant part of his life at the Temple, also referred to himself as "this one" instead of "I"). This speech mannerism is of importance for her, for when the Silver Surfer asked her to stop speaking in the third person, she refused to comply.

=== Costumes ===
She wears a green-and-yellow dress, a hairstyle which mimics insectile antennae, and goes barefoot.

== Reception ==
=== Accolades ===
- In 2011, Comics Buyer's Guide ranked Mantis 99th in their 100 Sexiest Women in Comics" list.
- In 2015, Entertainment Weekly ranked Mantis 43rd in their "Let's rank every Avenger ever" list.
- In 2019, Comic Book Resources ranked Mantis 10th in their "10 Most Powerful Telepaths In The Marvel Universe" list.
- In 2019, Sideshow ranked Mantis 6th in their "Top 10 Bug-Themed Comic Book Characters" list.
- In 2020, Scary Mommy included Mantis in their "Looking For A Role Model? These 195+ Marvel Female Characters Are Truly Heroic" list.
- In 2022, The A.V. Club ranked Mantis 86th in their "100 best Marvel characters" list.

== Other versions ==
=== Heroes Reborn ===
An alternate universe version of Mantis appears in Heroes Reborn. This version is the subject of Kang the Conqueror's love, causing him to attack the 20th century and the Avengers to show that he is worthy of her love. Mantis recognizes her love for Kang after he is killed by Loki.

=== House of M ===
An alternate universe version of Mantis appears in House of M. This version is a member of Shang-Chi's Dragons.

=== Old Man Quill ===
An alternate universe version of Mantis appears in Old Man Quill.

== In other media ==
=== Television ===
- Mantis appears in Guardians of the Galaxy, voiced by Jennifer Hale. This version is a member of the Universal Believers. In the episode "Knights in Black Helmets", Mantis is killed after failing to control the power of a Nova Corps helmet.
- Mantis appears in Lego Marvel Super Heroes - Guardians of the Galaxy: The Thanos Threat, voiced again by Jennifer Hale.

=== Marvel Cinematic Universe ===
Mantis appears in media set in the Marvel Cinematic Universe (MCU), portrayed by Pom Klementieff. This version is the daughter of Ego the Living Planet and half-sister of Peter Quill who initially serves the former before helping to stop him and joining the Guardians of the Galaxy. She first appears in Guardians of the Galaxy Vol. 2 and makes subsequent appearances in Avengers: Infinity War, Avengers: Endgame, Thor: Love and Thunder, and Guardians of the Galaxy Vol. 3 as well as The Guardians of the Galaxy Holiday Special. Additionally, an alternate reality variant of Mantis appears in the What If...? episode "What If... Thor Were an Only Child?".

=== Video games ===
- Mantis appears as a playable character in Guardians of the Galaxy: The Universal Weapon.
- Mantis appears as a playable character in Lego Marvel's Avengers, voiced by Ali Hillis.
- Mantis appears as a playable character in Marvel Future Fight.
- Mantis appears as a playable character in Marvel Avengers Alliance.
- Mantis appears in Marvel Avengers Academy, voiced by Mel Gorsha.
- Mantis appears in Guardians of the Galaxy: The Telltale Series, voiced by Sumalee Montano.
- Mantis appears as a playable character in Lego Marvel Super Heroes 2, voiced by Arina Ii.
- Mantis appears in Marvel's Guardians of the Galaxy, voiced by Emmanuelle Lussier-Martinez.
- Mantis appears in Marvel Snap.
- Mantis appears as a purchasable outfit in Fortnite: Battle Royale.
- Mantis appears as a playable character in Marvel Rivals.

=== Miscellaneous ===
Mantis, based on the MCU incarnation, appears in Guardians of the Galaxy – Mission: Breakout!, portrayed again by Pom Klementieff.
