= Lisa Teasley =

American writer and artist

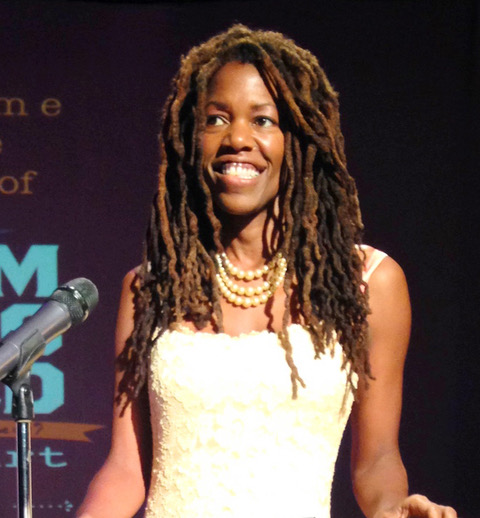
- Born: July 22, 1964 (age 62); Los Angeles, California, U.S.
- Occupation: Author
- Writing career
- Genre: Literary Fiction
- Notable works: "Fluid," Dive, Heat Signature, Glow in the Dark

Lisa Teasley is an American writer and artist. Her first book, the story collection Glow in the Dark (2002) won the Gold Pen and Pacificus Foundation awards. Her second and third books, the novels Dive (2004) and Heat Signature (2006), address gender, race, intercultural and justice issues. Teasley’s fourth book is the story collection Fluid (2023). She is the writer and presenter of the BBC television documentary “High School Prom” (2006), and the librettist of the opera The Passion of Nell, for Long Beach Opera, 2026. She was the Senior Editor, Fiction for the Los Angeles Review of Books from 2016-2021. She lives in Los Angeles and Mendocino.

== Early life and education ==
Lisa Teasley was born and raised in Los Angeles, California, to Larkin Teasley and Violet Teasley. Her father was African-American and former CEO of the largest black-owned insurance company Golden State Mutual in the U.S., her mother was Panamanian and an accessories designer. Teasley studied English literature and Creative Writing at UCLA. She studied art on summer scholarship at Otis/Parsons. Her first job was a paid internship with the Los Angeles Times, and then she worked as a researcher for Forbes magazine.

== Visual art ==
Lisa Teasley is also a visual artist. As a painter, she has had a one-woman show at the Watts Towers Art Center, with John Outterbridge as director and curator. Her group shows include Brockman Gallery, the Los Angeles County Museum of Art's Rental & Sales Gallery, and the Pittsburgh Center for the Arts. Teasley was a member of the former art collective HowDoYouSayYaminAfrican?, aka the Yams, who debuted their first film at the 2014 Whitney Biennial.

== Bibliography ==
- Fluid: Stories, Cune Press, 2023, paperback
- Glow in the Dark, Cloth, 2002, Cune Press
- Dive, Cloth, 2004, Bloomsbury
- Heat Signature, paperback, 2006 Bloomsbury
- Dive, paperback, 2006, Bloomsbury
- Glow in the Dark, paperback, 2006, Bloomsbury

== Anthologies ==
=== Short stories ===
- Flash Fiction America, WW Norton, 2023
- The Passenger: California, Europa Editions and Iperborea, 2022
- Joyland, Retro Volume 1, No. 3, 2013
- Women on the Edge, Toby Press, 2005
- Shaking the Tree, Norton, 2003
- Brown Sugar 4, published by Simon & Schuster, 2005
- Brown Sugar 3, Simon & Schuster, 2004
- Brown Sugar 1, Atria, 2001
- Step Into a World: A Global Anthology of the New Black Literature, Wiley, 2000
- In The Tradition: An Anthology of Young Black Writers, Harlem River Press, 2000

=== Essays ===
- Because I Said So, HarperCollins, 2005
- An Ear to the Ground, Cune Press, 1997

=== Poetry ===
- Beyond the Frontier, Black Classic Press, 2002

== Awards and honors ==
- Gold Pen 2002
- Pacificus Foundation 2002

== Literary Journals ==
=== Alta Journal ===
- Issue 28, Summer 2024, "Wendy Carmel, Carmel Wendy"

=== Black Clock ===
- Issue 5, Spring Summer 2006, “Modus Operandi”;
- Issue 7, Spring Summer 2007 “Late Blooming;
- Issue 10, Spring Summer 2009, “Joie de Vivre”;
- Issue 12, Spring Summer 2010, “Beach Volleyball is Church”;
- Issue 13, Fall/Winter 2010, “Mixed Tape” greatest hits issue “Joie de Vivre”;
- Issue 21, Spring Summer 2016, “Bang” (The Elephant Talker)

=== Kweli Journal ===
- Fall 2022, "Glossolalia"

=== The Markaz Review ===
- Issue 22, June 2022, “Death is Beautiful”

=== Parabola Magazine ===
- Fire Issue, 2021, "Lost and Found in the Fire"
- Belonging Issue, 2022, "The Only Black Person in the Room"
- Reality Issue, 2024, "A Brief Look at the Infinite"
- The Way of Magic Issue, 2024, "Curses"

=== Red Canary Magazine ===
- Winter 2023, "The Numerologist"

=== Zyzzyva ===
- Issue 99, 2013, “Full Circle”
