= Patrick Madden =

Patrick Madden may refer to:

- Paddy Madden (born 1990), Irish footballer
- Patrick Madden (essayist), writer and professor
