= Andy Hill (American music producer) =

American composer

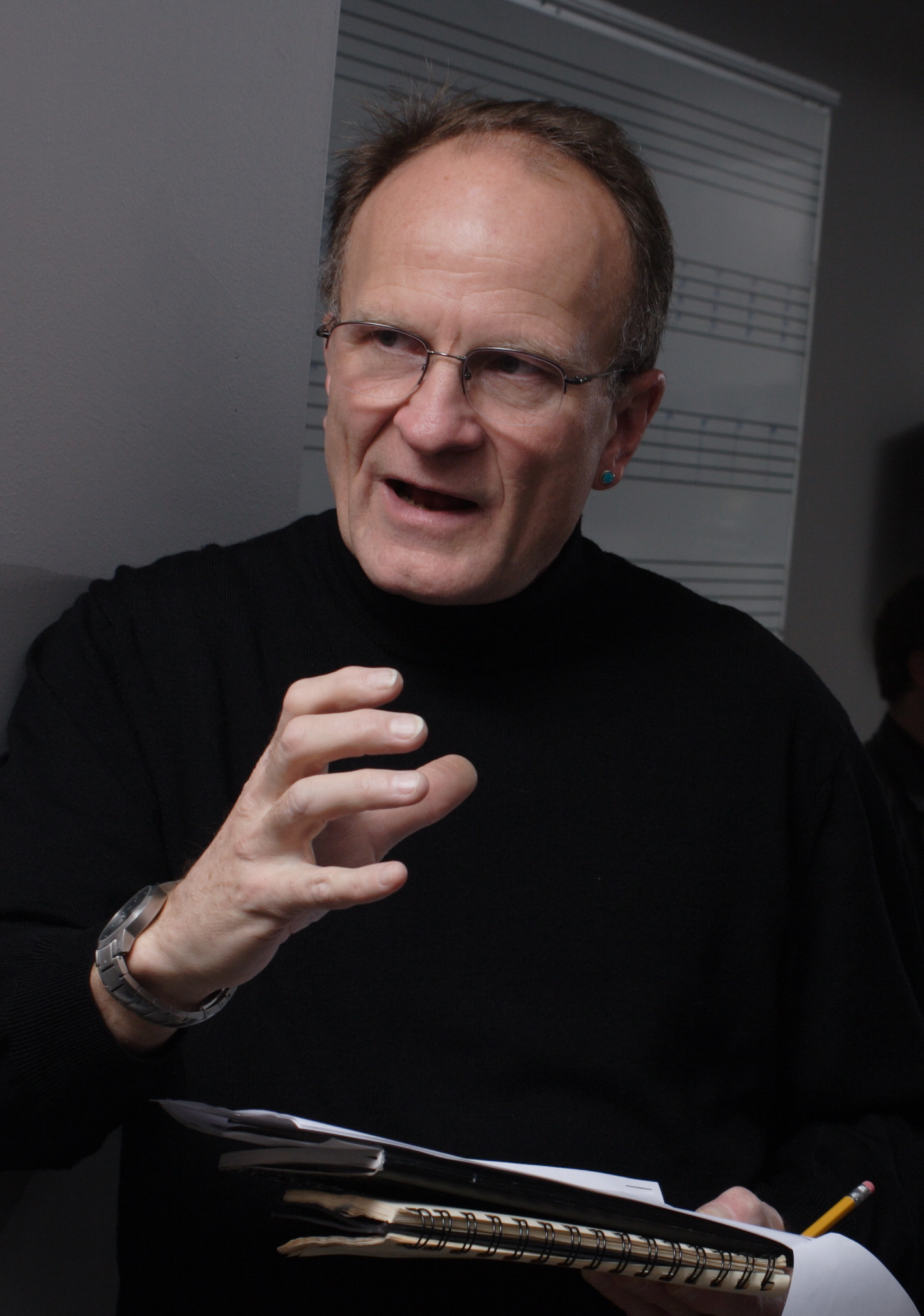
- Andy Hills talking
- Born: 1951 (age 74–75); Chicago, Illinois, U.S.
- Other name: A.W. Hill
- Education: New York University Tisch School of the Arts; University of South Wales (PhD)
- Occupations: Music supervisor, record producer, music educator, novelist

Andy Hill (born 1951) is an American music supervisor, record producer, and music educator. Under the name A.W. Hill, Hill has written four novels, Nowhere-Land, The Last Days of Madame Rey, Enoch's Portal, and Ministry, and a screenplay based on the life of Nikola Tesla. His film music textbook, Scoring The Screen: The Secret Language of Film Music, first published in 2017 (Rowman and Littelfield) will see its second edition published by Bloomsbury in January 2026.

== Biography ==
Andy Hill was born in Chicago, Illinois, United States, and educated at New York University's Tisch School of the Arts and received his doctorate in Film Musicology from the University of South Wales. From 1987 to 1996, during the period now referred to as the Disney Renaissance, he served as vice-president of music production for The Walt Disney Studios (division), overseeing music production on a roster of films which included The Lion King, Beauty and the Beast, and Sister Act, and working closely with composers and songwriters such as Alan Menken and Hans Zimmer. Films for which Hill supervised music under the aegis of the Disney music department earned nine Academy Awards in the categories of Best Original Score and Best Original Song for a Motion Picture. Subsequent to his term at Disney, Hill opened Andy Hill Film + Music under the auspices of Modern Music and supervised projects which included Message In A Bottle, Ed Wood, James and the Giant Peach and Happy Feet, winning a Grammy Award in 2000 as producer of the Best Musical Album for Children for Elmo In Grouchland.

From 2006 to 2011, Hill directed the graduate program in Music Composition for the Screen at Columbia College Chicago. His students have earned music credits on films such as Life of Pi, How To Train Your Dragon, and Perfume: The Story of a Murderer and found work with such notable composers as John Powell, Mychael Danna, Jeff Danna, Johnny Klimek, and Javier Navarrete.

In the fall of 2011, Hill was engaged to prepare and oversee the launch of graduate composition programs at Berklee Valencia, the international extension of the Berklee College of Music, with classes commencing in September 2012 in Valencia, Spain. Following matriculation of the first class of Berklee degree candidates and a pilot semester, he spent an additional six months in Spain and Morocco working on a portfolio of songs with an enigmatic producer known only as The Old Guitarist. In September 2013, Hill relocated to Belgium to take a post as executive soundtrack producer and director of international business development for Galaxy Studios, with the goal of bringing more high-level film scoring to the Flanders region and the musical stewardship of the Brussels Philharmonic. Concurrently, he launched Cinemuse VOF as a company under Belgian law, for music supervision and scoring services within the EU. In late 2015, Cinemuse, and Hill, relocated to Nashville, Tennessee, where his principal activities were teaching, lecturing, and mentoring aspiring film composers through his Cinemuse Composer Coaching service. In 2019, he relocated to Sofia, Bulgaria, where he served for six years as dean of the Film Scoring Academy of Europe, named by the Hollywood Reporter in 2022 and 2023 as one of the 20 Best Music Schools in the world before taking up his current post as Executive Dean for Creative Arts at Strayer University.

Hill's comprehensive study of landmark film scores, Scoring the Screen: The Secret Language of Film Music, was published in August 2017 by the Hal Leonard Corporation. In 2020, Hill received his PhD in Film Musicology from the University of South Wales. His dissertation was entitled BARDS OF THE SILVER SCREEN: Music and Meaning In Cinema.

== Writing career ==
Hill is also an American writer of speculative fiction and mystery. He grew up in the Midwest but began writing under the influence of Southern California and has been linked by novelist/ essayist Alan Rifkin to the tradition of "California fabulist literature." Hill has published three literary thrillers featuring Los Angeles cult investigator Stephan Raszer (Stee-vun Ray-zer), a tracker of missing persons and an expert in emerging religions in the present age of neo-millennialism and conspiracy theory. Raszer's preoccupation, as well as his author's, is in "what draws otherwise rational people to believe in unbelievable things...and act upon them." With his son, Nathanael, he authored a YA novel of speculative science-fiction entitled The Switch, published in 2017 by Curiosity Quills Press. His latest novel is Ministry, described by its author as a "post-apocalyptic romance," and was published in 2023 by TouchPoint Press. Ministry depicts a world ravaged by environmental catastrophe and ruled over by a God-like AI whose fiercest adversary is a young woman charged by her father with restoring "the soul of the world."

In 2003, Hill met Dorris Halsey, then 77, who became his agent. Halsey, who had been agent for Aldous Huxley and Henry Miller introduced the writer to those in her circle, including Dr. Mani Lal Bhaumik, with whom Hill developed the memoir Code Name God and for whom he edited a primer on cosmology, The Cosmic Detective, and Laura Huxley, with whom he briefly collaborated on a film adaptation of her late husband's novel, The Island. Halsey died in 2006, and her protégé Kimberley Cameron now helms the renamed Kimberley Cameron Agency. He has also written feature articles for the L.A. Weekly and short fiction for Susie Bright's Best American Erotica 2004 and the Absinthe Literary Review, which awarded him its Eros & Thanatos prize for The Grotto. Hill is represented for motion picture projects by Steve Fisher at APA.

=== The Stephan Raszer Investigations ===
Written in a neo-noir style, the Raszer Investigations are described by their author as "boundary explorations" that track the sometimes precarious path between faith and fraud, and between genuine mystical experience and madness. Using the detective genre as a foil for his metafiction, Hill employs his protagonist, Stephan Raszer, to probe a demimonde that oscillates between journalistic truth and high fantasy. Chandler scholar Judith Freeman described Raszer in the L.A. Weekly as "the thinking person's private eye" and Nowhere-Land, the third in the series, as "maybe the first truly 21st-century mystery I've read."

Hill's first novel, Enoch's Portal, was loosely based on the exploits of the infamous Order of the Solar Temple, a Franco-Swiss "suicide cult" that claimed the legacy of the Knights Templar and fifty-three lives. It was initially published in hardcover in 2001. The book was read in manuscript by Caldecott Chubb and then optioned by Paramount Pictures and assigned to director Alex Proyas, who developed two scripts before abandoning it to make "I, Robot."

Five years later, Hill followed with the second installment of the Stephan Raszer series, The Last Days Of Madame Rey, a tarot reading in the form of a mystery novel, or a mystery novel in the form of a tarot reading, with acknowledged literary debts to writers from Jules Verne to H. Rider Haggard to Jorge Borges to Wilhelm Reich. The third installment in the series arrived in June 2009 with Nowhere-Land, a Sufi legend mapped out as a role-playing game on the borderlands of Iraq, Syria, and Turkey in the imagined reality of a metastasizing Mideast war involving an ISIS-like Islamist sect that traces its origins to Hassan-i Sabbah's Cult of the Assassins. Nowhere-Land's panoramic and eerily prophetic cast of characters also involves members of the Yezidi sect and Kurdish peshmerga fighters, as well as the chimerical CIA agent Philby Greenstreet.

== Bibliography ==
=== Published works ===
- Hill, A. W. (2002). Enoch's Portal. Fox Point: Champion Press. ISBN 1-891400-59-2.
- Hill, A. W. (2007). The Last Days of Madame Rey. New York: Carroll & Graf. ISBN 0-7867-1881-1.
- Hill, A. W. (2009). Nowhere-Land. Berkeley: Counterpoint. ISBN 1-58243-498-0.
- Hill, A. W. (2017). Scoring The Screen: The Secret Language of Film Music. Milwaukee: Hal Leonard Publishing. ISBN 978-1-4950-7373-1.

=== Short stories ===
- China Lake (2009)
- The Org (2009)
- Death and the Plumber (2004)
- The Swami and the Savant (2005)
- The Grotto (2004)
- The Conductor (2003)

=== Screenplays ===
- Tesla
- Little Red Book
