= Sarbanes =

Sarbanes may refer to:

- Paul Sarbanes (1933–2020), former United States Senator from Maryland
- Janet Sarbanes, American writer
- John Sarbanes (born 1962), Member of the U.S. House of Representatives from Maryland's 3rd district and son of Paul Sarbanes
- Sarbanes–Oxley Act, a United States federal law sponsored by Paul Sarbanes and Michael G. Oxley
