= Mobilio =

Mobilio may refer to:

- Albert Mobilio, American poet and critic
- Domenic Mobilio (1969–2004), Canadian professional soccer player
- Honda Mobilio, a 2001–2008, 2014–present Japanese mini MPV
