= PEN USA =

PEN USA may refer to:

- PEN America, founded in 1922 and headquartered in New York City
- PEN Center USA, a former branch of PEN
