= Rachel Zucker =

American poet (born 1971)

Rachel Zucker (born 1971) is an American poet and academic. She is the author of five collections of poetry, most recently, SoundMachine (Wave Books, 2019). She also co-edited the book Women Poets on Mentorship: Efforts and Affections with fellow poet, Arielle Greenberg.

== Biography ==
Rachel Zucker was born in New York City in 1971. The daughter of storyteller Diane Wolkstein and novelist Benjamin Zucker, she was raised in Greenwich Village and traveled around the world with her parents on Wolkstein's folktale-collecting trips. After high school, Zucker attended Yale University where she majored in Psychology, focusing on Child Development, though she took as many literature, writing and photography classes as she was allowed. Zucker later went on to the Iowa Writers' Workshop where she received her M.F.A. in poetry.

She teaches graduate and undergraduate poetry classes at New York University's Creative Writing Program and in Antioch University's Low-Residency MFA program. She taught at Yale and served as poet in residence at Fordham University from 2005 to 2007.

Zucker is creator and host of the podcast Commonplace: Conversations with Poets (and Other People). She is currently working on an immersive audio project called SoundMachine, accompanying her 2019 collection of the same name. Her poem, "In Your Version of Heaven I Am Younger" was featured in the anthology, The Best American Poetry 2001 (edited by Robert Hass).

Zucker lives in New York City and Scarborough, Maine with her husband and three sons and teaches at New York University and Antioch University. She holds certifications as a labor doula from the Doulas of North America (DONA) and as a collaborative childbirth educator (CCE) from the Childbirth Education Association of Metropolitan New York. Since that time she has aided many women during labor, birth and postpartum and through her doula work and her writing, advocates for universal access to maternity care.

== Awards and honors ==
- National Endowment for the Arts Creative Writing Fellowship (2013)
- Bagley Wright Lecture Series, Lecturer (2016)
- Salt Hill Poetry Award (1999), judged by C.D. Wright)
- Barrow Street Poetry Prize (2000)
- Center for Book Arts Award (judged by Lynn Emanuel)
- "Museum of Accidents" was a finalist for the National Book Critics Circle Award.

== Bibliography ==
=== Poetry ===
- Eating in the Underworld (Wesleyan University Press, 2003)
- The Last Clear Narrative (Wesleyan University Press, 2004)
- The Bad Wife Handbook (Wesleyan University Press, 2006)
- Museum of Accidents (Wave Books, 2009)
- MOTHERs (Counterpath Press, 2013)
- The Pedestrians (Wave Books, 2014)
- SoundMachine (Wave Books, 2019)

==== Anthologies ====
- H.L. Hix, ed. (2008). New Voices: Contemporary Poetry from the United States. Irish Pages. ISBN 978-0-9544257-9-1.
- Zucker, Rachel; Greenberg, Arielle, eds. (2008). Women Poets on Mentorship: Efforts and Affections. University of Iowa Press. ISBN 9781587297212. OCLC 940893477.
- Zucker, Rachel; Greenberg, Arielle, eds. (2010). Starting today : 100 poems for Obama's first 100 days. University of Iowa Press. ISBN 9781587298714. OCLC 730002674.

=== Non-fiction ===
- Home/Birth (1913 Press, 2010)
- MOTHERs (Counterpath Press, 2014)
- The Poetics of Wrongness (Wave Press, 2023) ISBN 978-1950268702

=== Critical studies and reviews ===
- Burt, Stephanie (January–February 2010). "Smothered to Smithereens: The poetics of motherhood". Boston Review.
- Chiasson, Dan (June 2, 2014). "Mother tongue : poetry and prose by Rachel Zucker". The Critics. Books. The New Yorker. Vol. 90, no. 15. pp. 77–79.
