= The Problem with Everything =

2019 book by Megan Daum

- First edition
- Author: Meghan Daum
- Publisher: Gallery Books
- Publication date: 2019

The Problem with Everything: My Journey Through the New Culture Wars is a 2019 book on culture wars by Meghan Daum in which the author criticizes fourth-wave feminism, political correctness, woke-ness, social justice warriors, and cancel culture.
