= Dwayne Moser =

American artist and writer

Dwayne Moser is a Los Angeles based artist and writer.

Moser grew up in the Appalachian Mountains, in a town of less than 100 near the Maryland / West Virginia border. He studied Government and Politics at the University of Maryland, College Park then worked in the legal field for several years before beginning to make art in the late 1990s.

He earned an MFA in Art from California Institute of the Arts in 2001.

His visual art takes a variety of forms, including painting, photography, drawing, video and installation. He has shown his work internationally, with solo shows at the Stellan Holm Gallery in New York, the Laura Bartlett Gallery in London, and Lemon Sky Projects in Los Angeles and Miami.

In 2005 two of Moser's large-scale Untitled Backdrop paintings were purchased by the collector Charles Saatchi, selected for inclusion in one of his Triumph of Painting exhibitions.

Moser's work has been discussed in publications such as Artforum, Modern Painters (magazine), The New York Times, BBC, Flash Art, Zing Magazine and Rolling Stone, which named him its "Hot Artist" of 2005 in their annual Hot List.

He is also a writer, primarily of screenplays. Moser taught screenwriting for several years at CalArts, and helped found the literary magazine Black Clock. He was senior editor of this publication for four years, and now serves as editor-at-large.
