= Suzan Woodruff =

American abstract painter

- Born: Phoenix, Arizona
- Education: Arizona State University
- Known for: Painting
- Movement: Abstract
- Spouse: Bruce Bauman

Suzan Woodruff (born Phoenix, Arizona) is an American abstract painter, currently living and working in Los Angeles.

== Early life ==
Woodruff was born and raised in Sonoran desert terrain by her gold-prospector grandparents and her mother. She later received an art scholarship to attend Arizona State University, where she worked as a printmaker, painter, and sculptor.

== Work ==
Woodruff is best known for abstract, non-figurative feminist work created through a self-invented and designed "Gravity Easel," which controls the application of pigments and media. Her technique involves pouring acrylic paint onto panels, using a tiltable armature.

She received a National Endowment for the Arts/Arizona grant and residencies from the Sanskriti Center for the Arts, Virginia Center for the Creative Arts and 18th Street Arts Center. She has been reviewed in Art Ltd., Budapest Sun, ArtPulse Magazine, the Los Angeles Times, LA Weekly, and Delhi Today.

Woodruff's work has appeared in solo exhibitions at Katherine Cone Gallery, William Turner Gallery, and David Richard Gallery. Her work also appeared in the two-person show "Properties of Light," with sculptor Brad Howe, at the George Billis Gallery.

== Personal life ==
She currently lives in Los Angeles with her husband, the novelist Bruce Bauman.

== Bibliography ==
- Suzan Woodruff. Suzan Woodruff: Cracks in the Light. Katherine Cone Gallery, 2013. 40 pages.
