= Broken Sleep =

Book by Bruce Bauman

Broken Sleep: an American Dream
- Author: Bruce Bauman
- Cover artist: Jon Gray (aka gray318)
- Language: English
- Genre: political novel, picaresque, tragicomedy, postmodern, Jewish American literature, encyclopedic novel
- Publisher: Other Press
- Publication date: November 2, 2015
- Publication place: United States
- Media type: Print (paperback)
- Pages: 642
- ISBN: 9781590514481
- OCLC: 968985724
- LC Class: PS3602.A955

Broken Sleep: an American Dream is the second novel by American writer Bruce Bauman, published in 2015. It follows the exploits of the powerful Savant family, including rock star-cum-US presidential candidate Alchemy Savant, his half-brother Moses Teumer, and their brilliant but insane mother Salome Savant.

The novel chronicles 60 years of U.S. politics and pop culture, from the aftermath of World War II leading up to a speculative 2020 presidential election. The novel touches on many topics, including rock music, postmodern art, celebrity, insanity, terminal illness, the Holocaust, and United States presidential election politics. It makes political references to the fake news website phenomenon, the rise of a third party to save a failing two-party system, and a grass-roots movement for partition and secession in California. Its discussion of Jewish-American identity has led to its categorization as a Jewish literary novel in the vein of Saul Bellow.

== Plot ==
The novel has an asynchronous narrative structure that weaves together four major narratives:

- The Songs of Salome – these portions of the novel are told from the perspective of the central mother-figure, Salome Savant. A self-described “sensation artist,” Salome recounts her rise in the art world, as well as her experiences as the mother to the phenomenally popular rock star Alchemy Savant and to her disavowed firstborn Moses Teumer. Salome denies time's existence and frequently communes with identities she has inhabited in the past, including the Salome (disciple) who witnessed the Crucifixion and Lou Andreas-Salomé, lover to the poet Rilke.
- The Moses Chronicles – told from the perspective of an omniscient third-person narrator, these chapters largely focus on Moses Teumer, a middle-aged history professor. After a diagnosis of leukemia makes finding a donor for a bone marrow transplant the difference between living and dying, Moses discovers that he is not the son of a Jewish Holocaust survivor, but a Nazi war criminal. The discovery also unites him with his half-brother Alchemy Savant, and the two team up to revolutionize the U.S. political system.
- Memoirs of a Useless Good-For-Nuthin’ – these chapters are told from the perspective of the novel's picaresque antihero Ricky McFinn, aka “Ambitious Mindswallow.” They chart the development, rise, and breakup of the rock band the Insatiables, led by Alchemy Savant. A self-described “[t]wisted branch in a warped family tree,” Ambitious was born and raised in Queens. Throughout the novel, he struggles to reconcile his superstardom with the values and politics ingrained in him from his working-class, poor-white upbringing.
- The Canticles of Hannah – the third-person narrator gives insight into how the novel's second mother figure, the Jewish-American Hannah Teumer, came to marry a Nazi and adopt baby Moses.

The narratives are loosely related, linked together if not by chronological time, then by common characters and themes. But the novel hints at another way its four narratives relate to one another—namely that they were collected, compiled, and arranged by one of the novel's secondary characters, Jay Bernes, and given the alternative title "the Book of J." Jay, aka "J," is identified in the novel's back matter as the “Gifter of the Book of J,” while the character Persephone, who mistakenly self-identifies as Moses's niece, claims in the introduction that “auntie jay gave me a gift, the Book of J.” The author Bruce Bauman has also alluded to the Book of J's importance in relation to the novel's religious themes.

== Major characters ==
The book includes more than 70 characters, with appearances by Greta Garbo and Marcel Duchamp, as well as the protagonist in Bauman's first novel, And The Word Was. The focus, however, is primarily on the Savant family and the members of the rock band the Insatiables, as well as on several of their loved ones and enemies.

=== The Savant family ===
- Salome Savant – Artist and mother of Moses Teumer and Alchemy Savant.
- Moses Teumer – History professor. Firstborn son of Salome Savant and Malcolm Teumer. Half-brother to Alchemy Savant.
- Alchemy Savant – Lead singer of American band the Insatiables and 2020 US presidential candidate for the Nightingale Party. Second-born son of Salome Savant and Philip Bent, lead singer of British band The Baddists. Half-brother to Moses Teumer.

=== The Insatiables ===
- Alchemy Savant
- Absurda Nightingale (b. Amanda Akin) – Founding member of the Insatiables.
- Ambitious Mindswallow (b. Ricky McFinn) – Founding member of the Insatiables.
- Laluna (b. Maria Appelian) – Later member of the Insatiables. Partner of Alchemy Savant and mother of Persephone.
- Lux Deluxe (b. Lionel Bradshaw) – Founding member of the Insatiables.
- Silky Trespass – Member of Come Queens. Lead guitarist of the Insatiables (2004–08). Played with Absurda in the Mendietas.

=== Other recurring characters ===
- Jay Bernes – Art consultant. Wife of Moses Teumer.
- Hannah Teumer – Mother of Moses Teumer.
- Nathanial Brockton – Political activist. Longtime companion to Salome Savant.
- Persephone Savant – Daughter of Laluna.
- Malcolm Teumer – Nazi. Father of Moses Teumer.

== Critical reception ==
Since its publication by Other Press in 2015, reviews have been largely positive.

Michael Silverblatt, host of KCRW’s Bookworm, called the telling of Moses’s journey “funny, heartbreaking and beautiful.” In a starred review, the Library Journal called the book “a solid and captivating literary experience” that “successfully engages with eternal questions of truth and evil.” Heather Scott Partington, writing for Electric Literature, said that “Bauman manages to capture both the insatiable drive for fame and success, and the harsh reality of unrealized dreams that seem distinctly American.” PopMatters gave the book 8 out of 10 stars, calling the book “a family drama of biblical proportions.”

It made book critic David Kipen’s reading picks of the month, and Shelf Awareness called the book a "mind-bending work of fiction” that "represents contemporary life’s most existential crises.” Writing for Whitehot Magazine, art critic Shana Nys Dambrot called it a "sweeping novel of epic human flaws and unwieldy intergenerational destiny set against the paradisiacal dystopia of the late-20th century American art world.”
