= The Best American Short Stories 2021 =

2021 short story collection

- Editor: Jesmyn Ward and Heidi Pitlor
- Language: English
- Series: The Best American Short Stories
- Published: 2021
- Publisher: Houghton Mifflin Harcourt
- Media type: Print (hardback & paperback)
- ISBN: 9781328485380 (hardback)
- Preceded by: The Best American Short Stories 2020
- Followed by: The Best American Short Stories 2022

The Best American Short Stories 2021 is a volume in the annual Best American Short Stories anthology. It was edited by the series editor, Heidi Pitlor, and guest editor and two-time National Book Award winner, Jesmyn Ward.

== Short stories included ==
Author	Title	First published
Gabriel Bump	"To Buffalo Eastward"	McSweeney's (No. 59)
Rita Chang-Eppig	"The Miracle Girl"	Virginia Quarterly Review (Vol.96, No.4)
Vanessa Cuti	"Our Children"	West Branch (No. 94)
Jenzo DuQue	"The Rest of Us"	One Story (No.268)
Brandon Hobson	"Escape from the Dysphesiac People"	McSweeney's (No. 61)
Jamil Jan Kochai	"Playing Metal Gear Solid V: The Phantom Pain"	The New Yorker (January 6, 2020)
Nicole Krauss	"Switzerland"	The New Yorker (September 14, 2020)
David Means	"Clementine, Carmelita, Dog"	Granta (No. 152)
Yxta Maya Murray	"Paradise"	The Southern Review (Vol. 56, No. 3)
Eloghosa Osunde	"Good Boy"	The Paris Review (No. 234)
Jane Pek	"Portrait of Two Young Ladies in White and Green Robes (Unidentified Artist, circa Sexteenth Century)"	Conjunctions (No.75)
Tracy Rose Peyton	"The Last Days of Rodney"	American Short Fiction (Vol. 23, No.71)
Christa Romanosky	"In This Sort of World, the Asshole Wins"	The Cincinnati Review (Vol. 17, No.2)
George Saunders	"Love Letter"	The New Yorker (April 6, 2020)
Shanteka Sigers	"A Way with Bea"	The Paris Review (No. 234)
Stephanie Soileau	"Haguillory"	Zoetrope: All-Story (Vol.24, No. 2)
Madhuri Vijay	"You Are My Dear Friend"	The New Yorker (August 17, 2020)
Bryan Washington	"Palaver"	McSweeney's (No. 62)
Kevin Wilson	"Biology"	The Southern Review (Vol 56, No.1)
C Pam Zhang	"Little Beast"	BOMB (No. 153)
