= Ange Mlinko =

American poet and critic (born 1969)

- Born: September 19, 1969 (age 56); Philadelphia, Pennsylvania, United States
- Education: St. John's College (BA); Brown University (MFA)
- Occupations: Poet critic

Ange Mlinko (born 19 September 1969) is an American poet and critic. The author of six books of poetry, Mlinko was named a Guggenheim Fellow for 2014–2015. She teaches poetry at the University of Florida, where she directs the MFA@FLA creative writing program, and is the poetry editor of Subtropics. Her most recent book, Foxglovewise, was published in January 2025.

== Background ==
Ange Mlinko was born in Philadelphia. Her parents came to the United States a few years before she was born. "My father’s family was from Hungary, my mother’s from Belorussia, and they all had passed through Brazil after the Second World War, so intra-family communication happened in Portuguese, and they spoke their hearth language amongst themselves." She earned her BA from St. John's College and MFA from Brown University. She is the author of six books of poetry: Venice (2022); Distant Mandate (2017); Marvelous Things Overheard (2013), which was selected by both The New Yorker and the Boston Globe as a best book of 2013; Shoulder Season (2010), a finalist for the William Carlos Williams Award; Starred Wire (2005), which was a National Poetry Series winner in 2004 and a finalist for the James Laughlin Award; and Matinees (1999).

Her poems are about urban life, about language and its failings, about the things we see and do not see. She is often compared to Frank O’Hara. The New Yorker praised her “unique sense of humor and mystery.” John Ashbery said of her collection Starred Wire, “A fine-grained light like that of a nineteenth-century Danish landscape painting shimmers throughout these gorgeously tactile and tactful poems."

Mlinko has published widely as a critic, and her honors and awards include the Randall Jarrell Award in Criticism, the Frederick Bock prize from Poetry magazine for her poem “Cantata for Lynette Roberts,” and a fellowship from the Guggenheim Foundation. Mlinko has worked in Brooklyn, Providence, Boston, and Morocco. She has taught poetry at Brown, the Naropa University Summer Writing Program, Al-Akhawayn University in Ifrane, Morocco, and the University of Houston. She was the poetry editor for The Nation from 2013 to 2016.

== Awards ==
- 2004 National Poetry Series winner
- 2005 James Laughlin Award finalist
- 2009 Randall Jarrell Award
- "Marvelous Things Overheard" selected by Dan Chiasson as one of The New Yorker's Best Books of 2013
- 2014-15 Guggenheim Fellow

== Works ==
=== Books ===
- Immediate Orgy & Audit (Small Pr Distribution, 1996), poetry, 30 pages, ISBN 978-9997736673
- Matinées (Zoland Books, 1999), poetry, 55 pages, ISBN 978-1581950052
- Starred Wire (Coffee House Press, 2005), poetry, 70 pages, ISBN 978-1566891776
- The Children's Museum (Prefontaine Press, 2007), poetry, 18 pages, chapbook in an edition of 162.
- Shoulder Season, (Coffee House Press, 2010), poetry, 82 pages, ISBN 978-1566892438
- Marvelous Things Overheard, (Farrar, Straus and Giroux, 2013), poetry, 112 pages, ISBN 978-0374534806
- Distant Mandate (Farrar, Straus and Giroux, 2017), poetry, 112 pages, ISBN 978-0374248215
- Venice (Farrar, Straus and Giroux, 2022), poetry, 144 pages, ISBN 978-0374604004
- Difficult Ornaments: Florida and the Poets (Oxford University Press), criticism, 184 pages, ISBN 978-0197776551
- Foxglovewise (Farrar, Straus and Giroux, 2025), poetry, 112 pages, ISBN 978-0374613174

=== Other ===
- "Gallimaufry". Poetry. June 2007.
- "It Was a Bichon Frisé's Life . . ". Poetry. June 2008.
- "Treatment". The New Yorker. May 2009.
- "Win-Win". Poetry. June 2009.
- "Kouign Amann". Poetry. June 2009.
- "Bliss Street". The New Yorker. October 2010.
- "The Grind". Poetry. September 2012.
- "Supercell". The New Yorker. October 2015.
- "All Artists Are Dogs". Poetry Foundation. November 2015.
- Mlinko, Ange (August 2016). "Captivity". The Nation.
- "Poetry At Sea". Bagley Wright Lecture Series. September 2016.
