= Meghan Daum =

American author, essayist, podcaster, and journalist

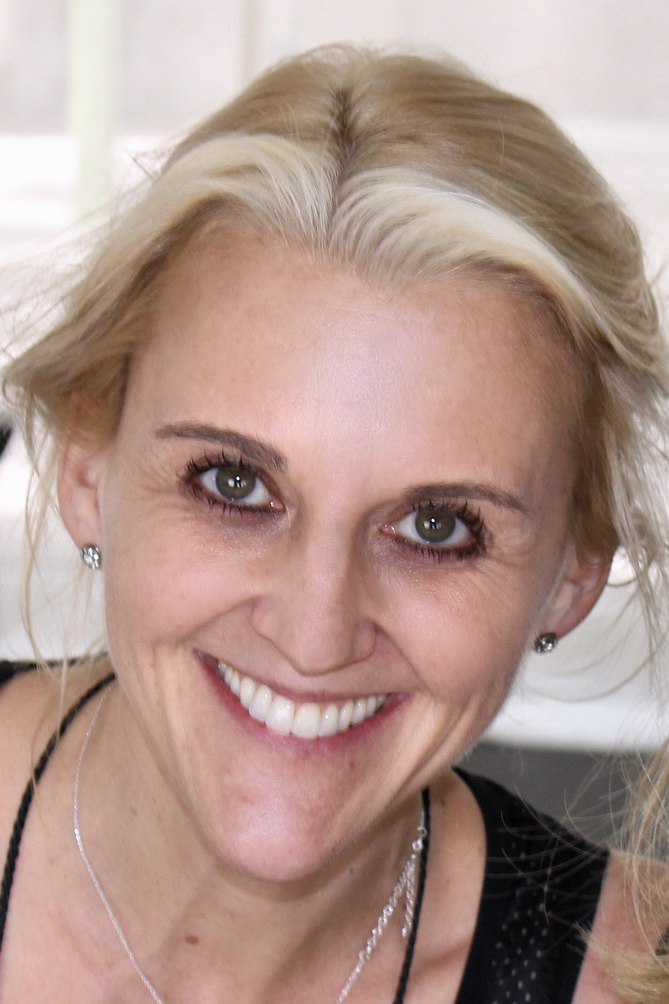
- Daum at the 2015 Texas Book Festival
- Born: February 13, 1970 (age 56); California
- Education: Vassar College; Columbia University (MFA)
- Occupation: Columnist
- Writing career
- Genres: Novelist, essayist
- Website: www.meghandaum.com

Meghan Elizabeth Daum (born February 13, 1970) is an American author, essayist, podcaster, and journalist.

== Childhood and education ==
Daum was born in California, and grew up in Austin, Texas, and Ridgewood, New Jersey. She received her bachelor's degree from Vassar College and her Master of Fine Arts degree from Columbia University.

== Career ==
Daum spent much of her twenties in New York City. In 1999, she moved to Lincoln, Nebraska, and the experience became the catalyst for her 2003 novel The Quality of Life Report, which follows the life and times of an ambitious young television journalist who trades New York for the fictional town of Prairie City and explores themes of social class in America as well as the contradictions of the "simplicity movement." She is also the author of two collections of essays, My Misspent Youth and The Unspeakable: And Other Subjects of Discussion, which was named as a top 10 books of the year by Slate and Entertainment Weekly. It won the 2015 PEN CENTER USA Literary Award for Creative Nonfiction.

Her work has appeared in The New Yorker, The New York Times Magazine, The Atlantic, Vogue, GQ, Harper's and elsewhere.

Daum lives in Los Angeles, California, and New York City. She has been an opinion columnist for the Los Angeles Times since 2005. She is a member of the adjunct faculty in the writing division of the School of the Arts at Columbia University.

Daum is a 2015 Guggenheim Fellow in general nonfiction and the recipient of 2016 National Endowment for the Arts fellowship in creative writing. In 2017 she served as the Bedell Distinguished Visiting Professor at the University of Iowa's Nonfiction Writing Program.

In 2020, Daum started a podcast for discussing complicated and controversial issues, The Unspeakeasy.

== Books ==
- Meghan Daum. (2001). My Misspent Youth: Essays. New York: Grove Press. ISBN 1-890447-26-9.
- Meghan Daum. (2004). The Quality of Life Report. New York: Penguin. ISBN 0-14-200443-X.
- Meghan Daum. (2010). Life Would Be Perfect If I Lived in That House. New York: Vintage Books. ISBN 978-0-307-45484-3.
- Meghan Daum. (2014). The Unspeakable: And Other Subjects of Discussion. New York: Farrar, Straus and Giroux. ISBN 978-0-374-28044-4.
- Meghan Daum., ed. (2015). Selfish, Shallow, and Self-Absorbed: Sixteen Writers on the Decision Not to Have Kids. New York: Picador. ISBN 978-1-250-05293-3.
- Meghan Daum. (2019). The Problem with Everything: My Journey Through the New Culture Wars. New York: Gallery Books. ISBN 978-1982129330.
- Meghan Daum. (2025). The Catastrophe Hour: Selected Essays. London: Notting Hill Editions. ISBN 978-1912559688.
