= Tom Lutz =

American academic (born 1953)

- Born: March 21, 1953 (age 73)
- Education: University of Massachusetts (BA); Stanford University (PhD)
- Occupations: Writer; literary critic
- Writing career
- Language: English
- Notable awards: American Book Award (2008)
- Website: www.tomlutzwriter.com

Tom Lutz (born March 21, 1953) is an American writer, literary critic and the founder of the Los Angeles Review of Books.

== Early life ==
Lutz grew up in Cedar Grove, New Jersey. He graduated from Greenwich (CT) High School. After working for years as a cook, carpenter, and musician in New York, Florida, and Iowa, he got a job cooking breakfast and lunch at a small college where the financial aid officer offered to get him a Pell Grant so he could enroll at the college for free. He continued in the job and took afternoon and evening classes at the University of Dubuque before transferring and receiving his B.A. degree in English and journalism from University of Massachusetts, and a master's degree and Ph.D. in Modern Thought and Literature from Stanford University.

== Career ==
Lutz taught American literature, cultural studies, literary theory, and creative writing at the California Institute of the Arts, University of Iowa, Stanford University, and the University of Copenhagen. He was Distinguished Professor and Chair of the Department of Creative Writing at University of California, Riverside and retired in 2024. He is now Distinguished professor emeritus.

He has published more than 100 articles in The New York Times, Los Angeles Times, The New Republic, Chicago Tribune, Die Zeit, ZYZZYVA, Exquisite Corpse, Salon.com, Black Clock and dozens of other magazines, newspapers, book collections, and literary and academic journals.

His books include Portraits (Rare Bird Lit, 2022), The Kindness of Strangers (University of Iowa Press, 2021), Aimlessness (Columbia University Press, 2021), Born Slippy: A Novel (Repeater Books, 2020), And the Monkey Learned Nothing: Dispatches from a Life of Travel (University of Iowa Press, 2017), Drinking Mare's Milk on the Roof of the World: Wandering the Globe from Azerbaijan to Zanzibar (O|R Books, 2016), Doing Nothing: A History of Loafers, Loungers, Slackers, and Bums in America (Farrar, Straus, Giroux, 2007; American Book Award), Cosmopolitan Vistas: American Regionalism and Literary Value (Cornell University Press, 2004; Choice Outstanding Academic Title), Crying: The Natural & Cultural History of Tears (WW Norton, 1999; New York Times Notable Book), and American Nervousness, 1903: An Anecdotal History (Cornell University Press, 1991; New York Times Notable Book). They have been translated into 13 languages.

He is the founding editor and publisher of Los Angeles Review of Books. Los Angeles Review of Books launched in April 2011. He also founded The LARB Radio Hour and The LARB Quarterly Journal.

He was the founding producer and host of The LARB Radio Hour.

In 2016, he launched the LARB Publishing Workshop, which seeks "to revolutionize the publishing industry from the ground up by increasing access, facilitating change, and inspiring invention through the recruitment, training, and mentorship of early-career talent from diverse backgrounds." Over 500 people have been through the workshop, and over 100 publishing professionals have helped teach the course.

In 2017, he launched LARB Books, which has published two dozen classic and new books.

He lives in Los Angeles, California, and St. Chamassy, France, in the Dordogne, with his wife, Laurie Winer. They now run the St. Chamassy Writers' Residency. Lutz has two new books appearing in 2025, Still Slippy: A Novel (Red Hen Press) and 1925: A Literary Encyclopedia (Rare Bird Lit).

== Awards ==
- 2008 American Book Award

== Works ==
Books:

- The Cloud of Unknowing. In preparation for Columbia University Press.
- 1925: A Literary Encyclopedia. Forthcoming, Rare Bird Lit, 2025.
- Archipelago: A Novel. Forthcoming, Red Hen Press, 2025.
- Portraits: Moments of Intimacy on the Road. Rare Bird Lit. November 2022. ISBN 978-1644282168.
- The Kindness of Strangers. University of Iowa Press. October 2021. ISBN 978-1609387884.
- Aimlessness. Columbia University Press. January 2021. ISBN 978-0-231-19935-3.
- Born Slippy. Repeater Books/Penguin Random House. February 2020. ISBN 978-1-912-24864-3.
- And the Monkey Learned Nothing: Dispatches from a Life in Transit. University of Iowa Press. October 2016. ISBN 978-1-60938-449-4.
- Drinking Mare's Milk on the Roof of the World: Wandering the Globe from Azerbaijan to Zanzibar. OR Books. May 2016. ISBN 978-1-682190-56-2.
- Doing Nothing: A History of Loafers, Loungers, Slackers, and Bums in America. Farrar, Straus and Giroux. May 2007. ISBN 978-0-86547-737-7.
- Cosmopolitan Vistas. Cornell University Press. 2004. ISBN 978-0-8014-8923-5.
- Crying: A Natural and Cultural History of Tears. W.W. Norton. January 2001. ISBN 978-0-393-32103-6.
- These "Colored" United States: African American Essays from the 1920s. Rutgers University Press. 1996. ISBN 978-0-813-52305-7.
- American Nervousness, 1903: An Anecdotal History. Cornell University Press. 1991. ISBN 978-0-8014-2581-3.

Other:

- "Gravy Donuts", in Juan Felipe Herrera, ed. Francisco Lomeli, forthcoming Arizona 2023.
- "Gravy Donuts", Iowa Review, forthcoming 2023.
- "Coming to LA: Images of the Migrant City", Pratik: A Magazine of Contemporary Writing, ed. Yuyutsu Sharma, April 2021
- "Chinggis Kahn, the Nomad Steppe, and the Mongolian Sublime", Red Dirt Forum, April 2020
- "Names, Thrills, and Sociopaths: Tom Lutz on Writing Born Slippy", with Tobias Carroll, in Vol. 1 Brooklyn, April 2020
- "The Achievement of Walter Mosley, LARB Radio Hour, March 2020
- "Five Things about Failure", DIYMFA, February 2020
- "Noir: A Conversation", with Steph Cha, LitHub, January 14, 2020
- "The Ship of State", a conversation with Dave Eggers, Los Angeles Review of Books, December 2019
- "The Movie-Made Self", an introduction to Merton of the Movies, by Harry Leon Wilson, LARB Classics, November 2019
- "Gun Island: An Interview with Amitav Ghosh", LARB Radio Hour, October 2019
- "In the Shadow of the Archive", in The Critic as Amateur, ed. Saikat Majumdar and Aarthi Vadde, Bloomsbury, September 2019
- "Where the Amateur Reader Ends, and the Professional Critic Begins", LitHub, August 2019
- “This Storm: Interview with James Ellroy", LARB Radio Hour, July 2019
- "The Parade: A Conversation with Dave Eggers", LARB Radio Hour, June 2019
- "Talent Show: A Conversation with Juliet Lapidos", LARB Radio Hour, Los Angeles, April 26, 2019
- "Making the World Safe for Nerds", Michael Silverblatt, a chapbook, A Public Space Books, November 2018
- "A Conversation with Laurie Winer and Seth Greenland, LARB Radio Hour, October 2018
- “A Conversation with Eric Vuillard and Laurie Winer", Chevalier's Books, LARB Radio Hour, September 2018
- "The Missing Narrator: A Conversation with Rachel Cusk", LARB Radio Hour, Los Angeles CA, May 2018.
- "Gun Love: A Conversation with Jill Clement", LARB Radio Hour, Los Angeles CA, March 2018
- "A Life in Letters: An Evening with Maxine Hong Kingston", LARB Radio Hour, Los Angeles CA, February 2018
- Interview with Antonio Damasio and Eric Newman, LARB Radio Hour, February 2018.
- "LA Femme en Noir", LALA, Fall 2017
- "Publishing in Los Angeles", LALA, Summer 2017
- "Behagen und Unbehagen aud der Matratze", Matratze/Matrize: Mobelierung von Subjekt und Gesellschaft, ed. Irene Nierhaus and Kathrin Heinz, Transcript, 2016.
- "The Commons as Network", ASAP/Journal, Vol. 1: p. 49–50, 2016.
- "A Conversation with Nicholson Baker", LARB Radio Hour, Los Angeles CA. September 2016.
- Interview, Elif Batuman, Los Angeles/New York, LARB Radio Hour, June 2016
- "Finding This Lost City in Honduras Was the Easy Part", The New York Times, March 20, 2015
- "Plov Day in Tashkent", Litscapes, ed. Caitlin M. Alvarez and Kass Fleisher, Steerage Press, 2015
- "Interview with Iconic Poet Nikki Giovanni", Los Angeles Review of Books, May 18, 2015
- "Tavis Smiley’s New Memoir of Maya Angelou", Los Angeles Review of Books, May 1, 2015
- "There’s No Writer’s Block in the Newsroom", Los Angeles Review of Books, April 5, 2015
- "John Rechy: An Interview" (with John-Michael Andriote), Los Angeles Review of Books, January 17, 2015
- "An Interview with No Pictures: BJ Novak", Los Angeles Review of Books, Dec 9, 2014
- "Notes form the Albanian Diaspora", Iowa Review, Fall 2014
- "Coda: Nostalgia", Iowa Journal of Cultural Studies, 2009
- "Think you know how to read, do you?". Salon. March 8, 2007. Archived from the original on October 24, 2012.
- "The Summer Next Time". The New York Times. September 4, 2006.

== Reviews ==
- Howard A. Rodman (January 20, 2020). "After Hours Capitalism: On Tom Lutz's 'Born Slippy'". Los Angeles Review of Books.
- Neal Schindler (June 28, 2006). "Doing Nothing: A History of Loafers, Loungers, Slackers and Bums in America". Seattle Weekly.
- Edward Rothstein (June 12, 2006). "In Tom Lutz's 'Doing Nothing,' Workaholics Are Closet Slackers (and Vice Versa)". The New York Times.
- Larry Sears (May 23, 2006). "Why does the couch potato make us so angry?". Christian Science Monitor.
