= Madhuri Vijay =

Indian author

- Born: Bangalore, Karnataka, India
- Education: Lawrence University, Iowa Writers' Workshop
- Occupation: Author
- Writing career
- Language: English
- Genre: Novel
- Notable awards: Pushcart Prize, JCB Prize
- Website: madhurivijay.com

Madhuri Vijay is an Indian author living in Hawaii. She is the author of The Far Field, which won the second JCB Prize for literature, India's most prestigious literary award.

== Early life ==
Vijay was born and grew up in Bangalore, India. In 2009, she graduated Phi Beta Kappa from Lawrence University, where she studied psychology and English. After graduation, she received a Watson Fellowship, which took her to South Africa, Malaysia, and Tanzania while studying people from India living in foreign lands. After the fellowship, she left to attend the Iowa Writers' Workshop.

== Writing ==
Her debut novel on Kashmir, The Far Field, won the JCB Prize for literature. Vijay said she was surprised that the book was even published in India, where publishers were reluctant to take it on due to the "current climate in the country."

She is a recipient of the Pushcart Prize and has been longlisted for the DSC Prize for South Asian Literature. Her writing has appeared in The Best American Nonrequired Reading, Narrative Magazine and Salon, among other publications. Her short story "You Are My Dear Friend", published in the 17 August 2020, issue of The New Yorker, was also included in The Best American Short Stories 2021. Her short story "Lara's Theme" was published in the Novewmber 24, 2025 issue of The New Yorker.

== Personal life ==
As of 2019, Vijay lives in Hawaii, where she teaches English.

== Awards ==
- Watson Fellowship (2009)
- Pushcart Prize (2019)
- JCB Prize for Literature (2019)
- Tata Literature Live First Book Award (2019)
- Carnegie Medal for Excellence in Fiction (2020), long-listed
- Crossword Book Award (2020)
- Women AutHer Award for Best Fiction (2020)
