= Patrick Madden (essayist) =

English professor

Patrick Madden is a Fulbright Fellow, writer, and professor at Brigham Young University and the Vermont College of Fine Arts.

Madden studied physics as an undergraduate at the University of Notre Dame. After graduating with a BS in 1993, he served a two-year mission for the Church of Jesus Christ of Latter-day Saints in Uruguay, where he met Karina Cabrera, whom he would later marry. Madden completed his master's degree in English at Brigham Young University in 1999 and his PhD in English at Ohio University in 2004. As a Fulbright fellow, he has twice traveled to Uruguay, where he researched the Tupamaros revolutionaries' record-breaking prison break in 1971.

== Selected works ==
- (2020). Disparates.
- (2016). Sublime Physick.
- (2015) with David Lazar (eds.). After Montaigne: Contemporary Essayists Cover the Essays.
- (2010). Quotidiana (essays).

== Awards and honors ==
Madden is a 2016 Howard Foundation fellow.

=== Awards ===
- 2008 AML Award (Personal Essay) for "A Sudden Pull Behind the Heart"
- 2010 AML Award (Personal Essay) for Quotidiana
- 2010 Foreword INDIES bronze award for Quotidiana
- 2011 Independent Publisher Book Awards gold medal for Quotidiana
- 2016 Foreword INDIES silver medal for Sublime Physick
- 2016 AML Award (Creative Nonfiction) for Sublime Physick
- 2017 Independent Publisher Book Awards gold medal for Sublime Physick

=== Finalist ===
- 2011 finalist for the PEN Center USA Literary Award for Quotidiana
- 2017 Community of Literary Magazines and Presses Firecracker Award for Sublime Physick
- 2017 15 Bytes Book Award for Sublime Physick
