= Grace Krilanovich =

American writer

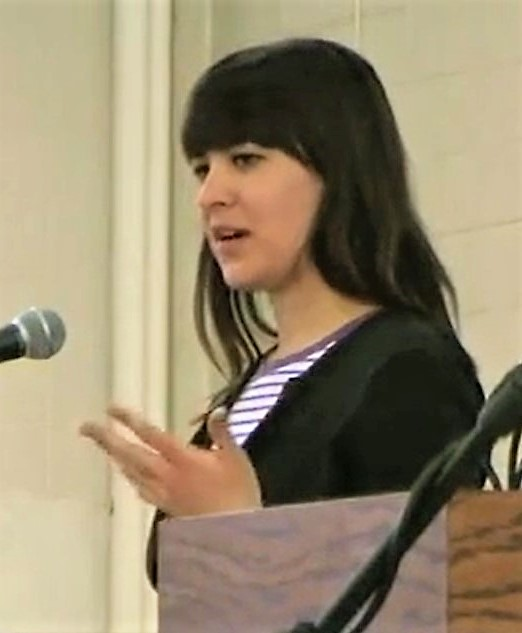
- Krilanovich at Franklin & Marshall College in 2011
- Born: Grace Krilanovich Hill; October 5, 1979 (age 47); Santa Cruz, California, U.S.
- Education: San Francisco State University (BA); California Institute of the Arts (MFA)
- Occupations: Novelist, writer
- Writing career
- Period: 1997–present
- Notable work: The Orange Eats Creeps (2010)
- Notable awards: National Book Foundation 5 Under 35 Honoree

Grace Krilanovich (born October 5, 1979) is an American author. Her first novel, The Orange Eats Creeps was published by Two Dollar Radio in September 2010. It was selected as one of Amazon's Best Books of the Year (2010) in the category of Science Fiction & Fantasy and was named a Top 10 Book of 2010 by Shelf Unbound.

In October 2010, she was selected as a National Book Foundation 2010 5 Under 35 Honoree, selected by Scott Spencer, Fiction Finalist for A Ship Made of Paper, 2003; Fiction Finalist for Endless Love, 1980 and 1981.

== Biography ==
Grace Krilanovich moved to the Los Angeles area from Santa Cruz, California in 2003. She attended San Francisco State University for her undergraduate studies, where she received a Bachelor of Arts degree in American Studies. She then went on to receive a Master of Fine Arts in Writing at the California Institute of the Arts, where she graduated in 2005. She currently works at the Los Angeles Times.

== Work ==
Excerpts from The Orange Eats Creeps appeared in Issue 3 and Issue 7 of Black Clock. Her essay on the subject of shock rocker GG Allin and Jefferson Airplane singer Grace Slick appeared in Issue 4: "Guilty Pleasures & Lost Causes." Krilanovich is named after Slick.

Black Clock editor and novelist Steve Erickson wrote the introduction to The Orange Eats Creeps.

The artwork of Mat Brinkman appears on the cover and opposite the title page of The Orange Eats Creeps.

Krilanovich has been a MacDowell Colony fellow, and was a finalist for the 2009 Starcherone Prize.

Krilanovich "is currently at work on a novel set in 1870s California." "More hobos. More neurotic trances. More aprons. A girl and a boy have nightmares about each other."

Krilanovich will be directing The Removals, written by Nicholas Rombes, produced by Two Dollar Radio Moving Pictures, for release in 2015.

The Orange Eats Creeps is being developed into a feature film “The Highway That Eats People” . Production is set to begin in autumn 2025.

Krilanovich's second novel, entitled Acid Green Velvet, was published by Two Dollar Radio in September 2026.
