= Geoff Nicholson =

British novelist and non-fiction writer (1953–2025)

Geoff J. Nicholson
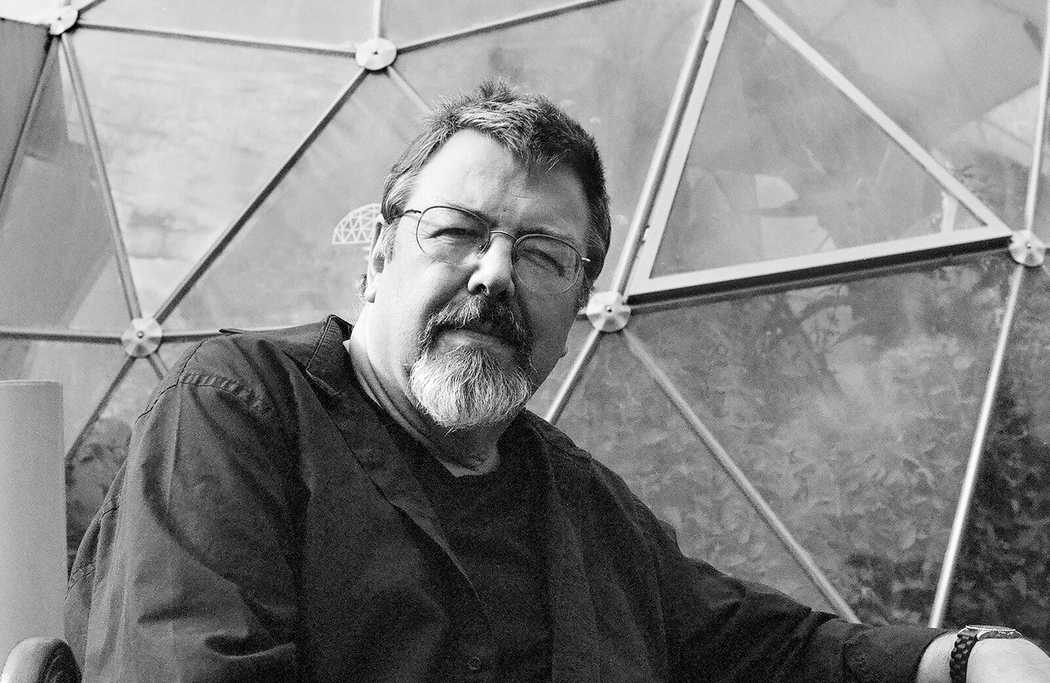
- Born: 4 March 1953; Hillsborough, Sheffield, England
- Died: 18 January 2025 (aged 71); Colchester, Essex, England
- Education: Gonville and Caius College, Cambridge; University of Essex
- Occupations: Novelist, non-fiction writer
- Spouses: Tessa Robinson (divorced); Dian Hanson (divorced)
- Partner: Caroline Gannon

Geoffrey Joseph Nicholson (4 March 1953 – 18 January 2025) was a British novelist and non-fiction writer.

== Background ==
Geoffrey Joseph Nicholson was born in Hillsborough, Sheffield on 4 March 1953. He studied English at Gonville and Caius College, Cambridge, and Modern European Drama at the University of Essex.

== Career ==
Nicholson was generally regarded as a satirist in the tradition of Evelyn Waugh, his writing also being compared favourably with that of Kinsgley and Martin Amis, Jonathan Coe, Will Self and Zadie Smith. The main themes and features of his books included leading characters with major obsessions, sexual and otherwise (guitars, Volkswagens, women's feet and shoes), interweaving storylines and hidden subcultures and societies. His books usually contained a lot of black humour. He also wrote several works of non-fiction and many short stories. His novel Bleeding London was shortlisted for the 1997 Whitbread Prize.

His travelogue Day Trips to the Desert was read on Radio 4 by Bill Nighy.

His novel What We Did on Our Holidays was made into the 2007 film Permanent Vacation, featuring David Carradine, directed by W. Scott Peake.

He was a member of the delegation of Los Angeles writers and filmmakers invited by the National Endowment for the Arts to participate in the Guadalajara International Book Festival in 2009.

== Personal life and death ==
Nicholson's marriages to Tessa Robinson and Dian Hanson ended in divorce. At the time of his death, he was in a relationship with Caroline Gannon.

Nicholson died from chronic myelomonocytic leukaemia at a Colchester hospital on 18 January 2025, at the age of 71.

== Bibliography ==
=== Novels ===
- Street Sleeper (1987)
- The Knot Garden (1989)
- What We Did on Our Holidays (1990)
- Hunters and Gatherers (1991)
- The Food Chain (1992)
- The Errol Flynn Novel (1993)
- Still Life with Volkswagens (1994)
- Everything and More (1994)
- Footsucker (1995)
- Bleeding London (1997)
- Flesh Guitar (1998)
- Female Ruins (1999)
- Bedlam Burning (2000)
- The Hollywood Dodo (2004)
- Gravity's Volkswagen (2009)
- The City Under the Skin (2014); Turkish translation: Haritali Adam (2015)
- The Miranda (2017)

=== Non-fiction ===
- Big Noises (1991)
- Day Trips to the Desert (1993)
- Andy Warhol: A Beginner's Guide (2002)
- Frank Lloyd Wright: A Beginner's Guide (2002)
- Sex Collectors (2006)
- The Lost Art of Walking (2008)
- Walking in Ruins (2013)
- The London Complaint (2016)
- The Suburbanist (2021)
- Walking on Thin Air (2023)
