= Los Angeles Review of Books =

Magazine of literary reviews

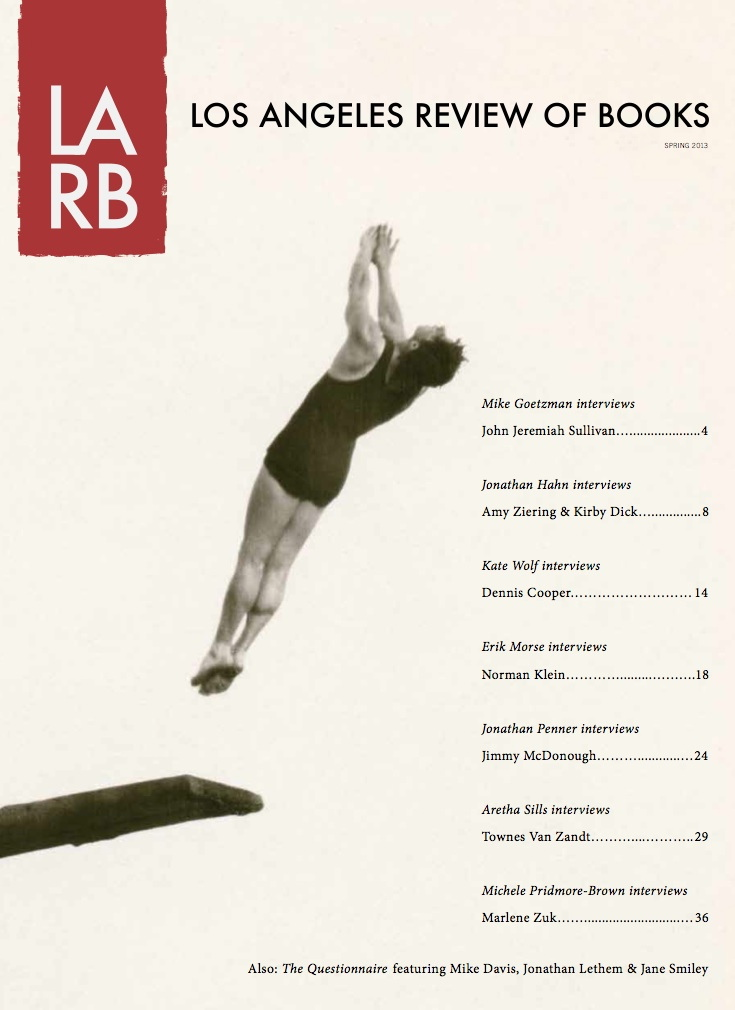
- Los Angeles Review of Books, Issue 1
- Executive Director: Irene Yoon
- Editor-in-Chief: Medaya Ocher
- Preceded by: Michelle Chihara (2023)
- Founding Chair: Albert Litewka
- Categories: Literature, culture, art, interviews
- Founder: Tom Lutz
- Founded: 2011; 14 years ago
- First issue: March 2013
- Country: United States
- Based in: Los Angeles, California
- Language: English
- Website: lareviewofbooks.org
- OCLC: 904358349

The Los Angeles Review of Books (LARB) is a literary review magazine covering the national and international book scenes. A preview version launched on Tumblr in April 2011, and the official website followed one year later in April 2012. A print edition premiered in May 2013.

Founded by Tom Lutz, Chair of the Creative Writing Department at the University of California, Riverside, the Review seeks to redress the decline in Sunday book supplements by creating an online “encyclopedia of contemporary literary discussion.”

== Coverage ==
The LARB features reviews of new fiction, poetry, and nonfiction; original reviews of classic texts; essays on contemporary art, politics, and culture; and literary news from abroad, including Mexico City, London, and St. Petersburg.

The site also proposes looking seriously at detective fiction, thrillers, comics, graphic novels, and other writing often dismissed as genre fiction, and printing reviews of books published by university presses. Of these plans, Lutz has said: “What’s considered worthy of study in the literary world has shifted radically over the past 50 years, and it reflects the natural evolution of academic thought, which is constantly raising questions about what matters.”

== Contributors ==
The site also features input from more than 200 contributing editors, including Reza Aslan, Aimee Bender, T. C. Boyle, Antonio Damasio, Jonathan Kirsch, Chris Kraus, Jonathan Lethem, Jeffrey Eugenides, Jane Smiley, David Shields, Greil Marcus, Jaron Lanier and Jerry Stahl.
