= Yxta Maya Murray =

American novelist (born 1970)

- Born: 1970 (age 55–56); Los Angeles, California, U.S.
- Education: University of California, Los Angeles (BA); Stanford University (JD)
- Occupations: Novelist; professor; writer
- Writing career
- Period: 1997–present
- Notable awards: Whiting Award (1999) Harvard Radcliffe Fellow 2024-2025, https://www.radcliffe.harvard.edu/people/yxta-maya-murray Art Writers Grant 2018, https://www.artswriters.org/grant/grantees/grantee/yxta_murray

Yxta Maya Murray (born 1970) is an American Latina novelist and professor at Loyola Marymount School of Law.

== Career ==
Murray graduated cum laude from the University of California, Los Angeles and received her JD from Stanford University with distinction. She teaches at Loyola Law School.

Her writing has appeared in Buzz, Glamour, and ZYZZYVA, and her novel "The Conquest" won the 1999 Whiting Award.

== Reception ==
Locas - "Murray perfectly captures the patois and fury of the Mexican women..." and "The reader equipped with a Spanish-English dictionary has the best chance to grasp all the nuances of this convincing, under-the-skin work.", "It's that predictable both in plot and texture." and "A female Scarface, this straightforward narrative charts the rise and fall of Latin gangsters on L.A.'s mean streets with considerable documentary fervor but not much depth.", "Even if Locas is as persuasive and true-sounding as a smart documentary, Murray keeps her novel as tight as her main character keeps her mind..."

What it Takes to Get to Vegas - "The suffering hero, the bullet in the gut, come to think of it, this does sound like The Natural, doesn't it? But the boxing story works, told to us by a femme fatale for whom we can feel much sympathy.", "uneven but arresting" and "Readable and intelligent, though this writer of promise and ferocious energy needs to scrutinize her subject matter a little more deeply."

The Conquest - "Another ponderous and trendy novel from Murray..." and "A fluid and genuinely interesting story badly weighed down by leaden prose ... and a thoroughly hackneyed view of Latin American history.", "The subplot about Sara's literary sleuthing ties the two stories neatly together and gives the book a satisfying edge of suspense."

The Queen Jade - "Fiery beauties and rakish hunks can't enliven this overblown melodrama.", "These entertaining characters are all sharply drawn, and the depiction of the teeming jungle is breathtaking. But Murray is less successful at conveying the mythos of the Queen Jade and the history of its pursuit."

The King's Gold: An Old World Novel of Adventure - "In heroine Sanchez, Murray has created a perfect counterweight to the traditional macho hero."

The Good Girl's Guide To Getting Kidnapped - " This may not be great literature, but it holds strong appeal for teens who can't get enough street lit.", "This fast-paced story, heavy with street dialogue and slang, should have ample teen appeal."

The World Doesn't Work That Way, but It Could (U Nevada Press, 2020), called a "force of nature" by Story Circle Network, https://www.storycircle.org/book_review/the-world-doesnt-work-that-way-but-it-could/

God Went Like That (Curbstone/Northwestern 2023): PW: "Murray shines with this ambitious project." https://www.publishersweekly.com/978-0-8101-4602-0

We Make Each Other Beautiful: Art, Activism and the Law (Cornell 2024). Los Angeles Review of Books: "In this groundbreaking book, Murray ushers in a new era of legal and artistic production, to the benefit of both." https://lareviewofbooks.org/article/rejoice-artists-and-lawyers-at-the-mutual-goal-of-art-and-law-on-yxta-maya-murrays-we-make-each-other-beautiful/

Her short story Paradise was first published in The Southern Review in 2020 and subsequently included in The Best American Short Stories 2021.

== Works ==
- Locas. Grove Press. 1998. ISBN 978-0-8021-3564-3.
- What It Takes to Get to Vegas. Grove Press. 2000. ISBN 978-0-8021-3737-1.
- The Conquest: A Novel. HarperCollins. 2003. ISBN 978-0-06-009360-0. (reprint)
- The Queen Jade: A Novel. HarperCollins. 2005. ISBN 978-0-06-058264-7. (reprint)
- The King's Gold: An Old World Novel of Adventure. Harper. 2008. ISBN 978-0-06-089108-4.
- The Good Girl's Guide to Getting Kidnapped, Razorbill (January 7, 2010) ISBN 978-1-59514-272-6
- Art Is Everything. Northwestern University Press. 2020. ISBN 978-0-8101-4292-3.
- We Make Each Other Beautiful. Ithaca: Cornell University Press. 2024. ISBN 978-1-5017-7558-1.

== Awards ==
- Harvard Radcliffe Fellow 2024-2025, https://www.radcliffe.harvard.edu/people/yxta-maya-murray
- 1999 Whiting Award
- 1996 National Magazine Award for Fiction

=== Criticism ===
- "Yxta Maya Murray on ‘Love and Consequences’ Hoax", truthdig, Mar 4, 2008
