= PEN Center USA =

Literary and human rights organization

- A Human Rights & Literary Arts Organization
- Formation: 1943
- Type: Nonprofit; literary society; human rights campaigning
- Legal status: Association
- Purpose: Advocacy; programs; events
- Headquarters: London, England
- Location: Los Angeles, California
- Region served: Western half of the USA
- Official language: English
- Executive Director: Michelle Franke
- Key people: Board of Directors
- Main organ: PEN America
- Parent organization: International PEN
- Website: penusa.org (usurped)
- Formerly called: PEN Center USA

PEN Center USA was a branch of PEN International, a literary and human rights organization. It was one of two PEN International Centers in the United States, the other being PEN America in New York City. On March 1, 2018, PEN Center USA unified under the PEN America umbrella as the PEN America Los Angeles office. PEN Center USA was founded in 1943 and incorporated as a nonprofit association in 1981. As of 2018, much of PEN Center USA's programming continues out of the PEN America Los Angeles office, including the Emerging Voices Fellowship, PEN In the Community writing residencies and guest speaker program, and the PEN Presents conversation series.

== History ==
The organization was established in 1943. In 1952 PEN International granted it the right to become PEN Los Angeles Center, able to set up its chapters. In 1981 it was incorporated as a non-profit organization. In 1988 it requested a name change, and eventually, it was renamed to PEN USA Center West. On March 1, 2018, PEN Center USA unified under the PEN America banner.

== Mission statement ==
PEN Center USA's mission is to stimulate and maintain interest in the written word, to foster a vital literary culture, and to defend freedom of expression domestically and internationally.

== Freedom to Write Programming ==
PEN Center USA offers Freedom to Write programming, manifested in four channels of action: the FTW Advocacy Network, the Emerging Voices Fellowship, PEN in the Community, and the annual Literary Awards. Each of these programs pursue the goals of the essential Freedom to Write idea—to support writers' freedom of expression and to promote access to their writing globally.

=== Freedom to Write Advocacy Network ===
Freedom to Write Advocacy Network is a worldwide, collaborative effort to support free speech and to defend writers whose civil and human rights have been violated. In 1948, International PEN members helped to craft Article 19 of the Universal Declaration of Human Rights, which guarantees that "everyone has the right to freedom of opinion and expression... and to seek, receive, and impart information and ideas through any media and regardless of frontiers." PEN holds Category A status at UNESCO and consultative status with the United Nations.

As a member of International PEN's Writers in Prison Committee, PEN Center USA members visit their colleagues in prison in other parts of the world and deliver aid in the form of letters and financial assistance. PEN Center USA's Freedom to Write Committee, made up of more than 200 volunteer writers, investigates regional and country-specific problems. Past efforts include the Nigeria Initiative, aimed at publicizing the link between oil politics and the silencing of dissent in Nigeria, and a coordinated campaign to end violent attacks against journalists in Latin America.

As a member of the Rapid Action Network of PEN International, the PEN Center USA receives and responds to reports of arrests, attacks, and threats to more than 700 writers currently at risk around the world.

=== PEN in the Community ===
A PEN In the Community (PITC) writing residency is a generative writing workshop that takes place in a classroom, community center, nonprofit organization, shelter, or reservation. Written work collected during the residency is published by PEN Center USA in PITC anthologies, which are windows into participant's lives—their struggles, hopes, and experiences. PITC instructors are selected from PEN Center USA's diverse membership to best match the needs of the community where they will teach.

In preparation for a PITC writing residency, PITC instructors and community leaders attend a mandatory orientation session at the PEN Center USA office. Then, working with the community leader, the PITC instructor develops a curriculum, to help the participants complete a solid body of creative writing work. A PITC writing residency consists of twelve in-class writing workshops, the publication of a participant anthology, and a final public reading. Throughout the semester, the PITC program coordinator makes visits to each community center and communicates with all PITC instructors and community leaders weekly.

=== Emerging Voices Fellowship ===
Emerging Voices is a literary fellowship that aims to provide new writers, who lack access, with the tools they will need to launch a professional writing career. The eight-month fellowship includes:

Professional mentorship: Emerging Voices Mentors are carefully chosen from PEN Center USA's membership and from professional writers based in Los Angeles. The Mentor-Fellow relationship is expected to challenge the fellow's work and compel significant creative progress. Throughout the fellowship, Emerging Voices Fellows and Mentors should meet three times in person and be in contact at least once a month. In these three meetings, Mentors will offer written feedback on the Emerging Voices Fellows' work in progress. Authors who have been mentors in the past include Ron Carlson, Harryette Mullen, Chris Abani, Ramona Ausubel, Meghan Daum, and Sherman Alexie.

Classes at the UCLA extension writers' program: Participants will attend two free courses (a 12-week writing course and a one-day workshop) at UCLA Extension, donated by the Writers' Program. Program Manager will assist the Emerging Voices Fellows with course selection.

Author evenings: Every Monday, fellows will meet with a visiting author, editor or publisher and ask questions about craft. Fellows must read each visiting author's book before the evening. A schedule of Author Evenings will be distributed at the first Emerging Voices orientation meeting. Authors who have participated in the past have included Jonathan Lethem, Percival Everett, Maggie Nelson, Cynthia Bond, Aimee Bender, Jerry Stahl, and Bruce Bauman, senior editor of the literary magazine Black Clock.

Master classes: After completing the UCLA Extension Writers' Program courses, Emerging Voices Fellows will enroll in a master class. The master class is a genre-specific workshop with a professional writer that allows fellows to exchange feedback on their works in progress. Previous Master Class Instructors have included Diana Wagman, Alex Espinoza, and Paul Mandelbaum.

Volunteer project: All Emerging Voices Fellows are expected to complete a 25-hour volunteer project that is relevant to the literary community. A few of the organizations that have participated included WriteGirl, 826LA, Cedars-Sinai Hospital, and STARS – San Diego Youth Services.

Voice instruction class: The Fellowship will provide a one-day workshop with Dave Thomas, a professional voice actor. The Emerging Voices Fellows will read their work in a recording studio and receive instruction on reading their work publicly.

Public readings: Fellows will participate in three public readings, The Welcome Party, Tongue & Groove Salon, and the Final Reading. Fellows have read in various venues and events including the Los Angeles Times Festival of Books, Silver Lake Jubilee, Skylight Bookstore, The Standard, Downtown LA, and Hotel Café. For the past five years, the fellowship has culminated in a Final Reading held in Hammer Museum's Billy Wilder Theater, showcasing the progress each fellow has made in his or her work.

Stipend: The fellowship includes a $1,000 stipend, given in $500 increments.

Participants need not be published, but the fellowship is directed toward poets and writers of fiction and creative nonfiction with clear ideas of what they hope to accomplish through their writing.

The program is directed towards new writers who lack financial or creative access and writers from immigrant, minority, and other underserved communities.

=== Literary awards and festival ===
PEN Center USA's annual awards program, established in 1982, is a unique, regional competition that recognizes literary excellence in eleven categories: fiction, creative nonfiction, research nonfiction, poetry, children's literature, graphic literature, translation, journalism, drama, teleplay, and screenplay. Past award winners include Barbara Kingsolver, Maxine Hong Kingston, T. C. Boyle, and Paul Thomas Anderson. Each year, PEN Center USA calls for submissions of work produced or published during one calendar year by writers living west of the Mississippi River. Entries in the eleven categories are reviewed and judged by panels of distinguished writers, critics, and editors. Winners are announced the following fall, and each receives a $1,000 cash prize, a free year of membership with PEN Center USA, and an invitation to the Annual Literary Awards Festival in Los Angeles.

The Literary Awards Festival is held in Beverly Hills and includes a dinner, a silent auction or raffle, and the presentation of The Literary Awards and honoree awards. This gala is the only one of its scope on the West Coast and is attended by more than 400 prominent members of the literary community. Past recipients of the Award of Honor and Lifetime Achievement Award include Ray Bradbury, Elmore Leonard, Norman Lear, Carolyn See, Gore Vidal, and Billy Wilder. The evening also features the presentation of the prestigious First Amendment Award, given to a candidate who has done work in the domestic United States to protect the First Amendment, as well as the Freedom to Write Award, given to a candidate who has fought for freedom of expression internationally. Both awards honor men and women who have produced exceptional work in the face of extreme adversity, who have been punished for exercising their freedom of expression, or who have fought against censorship and defended the right to publish freely.

== Membership ==
PEN Center USA's membership consists of over 700 published authors (Professional members), as well as literary community supporters (Distinguished Patron and Patron members), students (Student members), and booksellers (Bookseller members). The annual dues of membership, which vary by type, provide significant financial support that allows members to carry out the work of PEN Center USA.

== Literary events ==
PEN Center USA produces a variety of events and original programming every year, including smaller staged readings, regular reading series, and large-scale special events for literary occasions.

== See also ==
- International PEN
  - PEN America
  - PEN Canada
  - Sydney PEN
