= Bruce Bauman =

American writer

- Born: New York City, U.S.
- Occupation: Instructor
- Spouse: Suzan Woodruff
- Writing career
- Language: English
- Genres: Novels, short stories
- Notable works: Broken Sleep (2015); And The Word Was (2006)
- Movement: Postmodernism

Bruce Bauman is an American writer. He is the author of the novels Broken Sleep (2015) and And The Word Was (2006). His work has appeared in the Los Angeles Times, Salon, BOMB, Bookforum, Dart International Magazine, and Black Clock. He has previously been awarded the City of Los Angeles Award in literature (2008-2009), a Durfee Foundation grant, and an UNESCO/Aschberg award.

== Career ==
Bauman formerly taught in CalArts's MFA Creative Writing Program and School of Critical Studies. He served as the senior editor for the literary magazine Black Clock for 13 years, from its inception to its end in 2016.

== Personal life ==
Born in Brooklyn and raised in Flushing, Queens, Bauman currently lives in Los Angeles with his wife, the painter Suzan Woodruff.

== Bibliography ==
Novels

- And The Word Was (2006, ISBN 978-1590512241)
- Broken Sleep (2015, ISBN 978-1590514481)

Short stories

- The Newly Born Woman
- Lilith in Wunderland
- Angel, Heaven, Yesterday
- Day Time

Essays

- Television at CBGB

Articles

- Stewart Wallace & Michael Korie's Harvey Milk
- Amnesia
- Fiscal Cliff Notes From a Long-Suffering Lefty
- Bruce Bauman's Guide to Books and Booze
- On The Random Discovery of Life-Changing Books
- The Non-Champions Hall of Fame
- Old Songs for the New Resistance

Art Reviews

- Anders A at Highways Performance Space
- Victor Ekpuk at 18th Street Arts Complex
- Rev. Ethan Acres at Patricia Faure
- Anita Dubeat Patricia Correia
- Shirin Neshat at Patrick Painter
- Donald Moffett & Sister Corita at UCLA Hammer
- J.S.G. Boggs at Frumkin/Duval
- Rev. Ethan Acres at Patricia Faure
- Anita Dubeat Patricia Correia
- Shirin Neshat at Patrick Painter
- Off the Hook at S.K. Gallery
- Michal Rovner at Shoshana Wayne
- Don Giffin at Christopher Grimes
- The Empty Deep. Gerhard Richter at the MoMA
- Exit/Salida
- The Art of War
- The Life Lessons of Don Giffen
- Beuys Will Be Beuys

Interviews

- The Critic in Winter
