= John Mandel =

American visual artist

John Mandel is an American visual artist and one of the first photorealists to emerge in New York. His figurative oil and acrylic paintings, often monochromatic, were a departure from ordinary subject depiction. His works involved movement in compressed space. Mandel's work was exhibited at Max Hutchinson Gallery in SoHo and in the first biennial exhibition at the Whitney Museum; his work has also been shown in the Los Angeles Institute of Contemporary Art, Santa Monica Museum of Art, and in the Max Hutchinson, Sidney Janis, Modernism, Thomas/Llewellen, and Krygier/Landau Contemporary Art.

== Teaching ==
Mandel has been a faculty member at his alma mater, Pratt Institute; Otis Art Institute; Art Center College of Design; and now teaches at California Institute of the Arts.
