= Arielle Greenberg =

American writer

- Born: October 24, 1972 (age 53); Columbus, Ohio
- Occupations: Poet, Editor
- Writing career
- Notable works: Gurlesque: The New Grrly, Grotesque, Burlesque poetics
- Notable awards: MacDowell Colony fellowship
- Website: www.ariellegreenberg.net

Arielle Greenberg (born 1972) is a feminist poet and the poetry editor of Black Clock. She named and described the concept of the Gurlesque in the anthology Gurlesque: The New Grrly, Grotesque, Burlesque Poetics, which she co-edited with Lara Glenum.

== Biography ==
Greenberg was an assistant professor in the English Department at Columbia College Chicago. She is now living with her family in Belfast, Maine. They are working on an oral history-style book on the back-to-the-land movement in that area.

== Concept of the Gurlesque ==
The words of the Gurlesque "luxuriate: they roll around in the sensual while avoiding the sharpness of overt messages, preferring the curve of sly mockery to theory or revelation."

The term "Gurlesque" comes from a combination of "1. The Carnivalesque. 2. The Burlesque. (and the Neo-Burlesque). 3. The Riot Grrrls... Also, the Grotesque." The term describes a very wide range of things and is a concept that even Greenberg has had trouble pinning down. Lara Glenum describes it in her introduction to Gurlesque as a kitschy, campy take on feminism. Gurlesque is an avant-garde view of feminism which followed many of the same ideas of disrupting gender roles that allowed the Kinderwhore look and Riot Grrrl "movement" to take hold. Glenum and Greenberg both insist that, like the Riot Grrrl "movement", Gurlesque poetics is "not a movement or a camp or a clique." The concept of the Gurlesque merely strings together a common strain that Greenberg noticed flowing through modern feminist poetry in the early 2000s.

== Works ==
=== As author ===
Poetry

- Fa(r)ther Down: Songs from the Allergy Trials
- Given
- Locally Made Panties
- My Kafka Century
- Share Her
- Slice

Non-Fiction

- Youth Subcultures: Exploring Underground America

=== As editor ===
- Home/Birth: A Poemic
- Gurlesque: The New Grrly, Grotesque, Burlesque Poetics
- Starting Today: 100 Poems for Obama’s First 100 Days
- Women Poets on Mentorship: Efforts and Affections
- Mirror-Fucation
- Mister Hay's Trippy Moebius
- Pisacho
