= Marvel Comics: The Untold Story =

First edition

Marvel Comics: The Untold Story is a 2012 book by Sean Howe, based on the history of Marvel Comics and published by HarperCollins. Howe decided to write the book because the stories comic creators told in fanzine interview always seemed different from the official narrative. It starts with the comics published during the golden age, the characters created by Stan Lee and Jack Kirby, and then follows with the later decades. The information presented draws on over 150 interviews conducted by Howe. The books ends the coverage by the time of the creation of the Marvel Cinematic Universe. GQ's Joshua Rivera described the book as "one of the most comprehensive and well-researched accounts" of Marvel.
