= Albert Mobilio =

American poet and critic

- Occupations: Poet; critic

Albert Mobilio is an American poet and critic. He teaches at Eugene Lang College, the liberal arts college of The New School university. His work appears in Bomb, Salon, Postmodern Culture, Harper's. He is an editor of Hyperallergic and is a former editor of Bookforum.

== Awards and honors ==
- 1994 Gertrude Stein Award for Innovative Writing, Sun & Moon Press
- 1999 The National Book Critics Circle, Nona Balakian Award for Excellence in Reviewing
- 2000 Whiting Award
- 2015 MacDowell Fellowship
- 2017 Andy Warhol Arts Writer Grant

== Works ==
=== Books ===
- Bendable Siege. Red Dust. 1991. ISBN 978-0-87376-068-3.
- The Geographics. Hard Press. 1995. ISBN 978-0-9638433-2-6.
- The Handbook of Phrenology. Illustrator Hilary Lorenz. Dolphin Press at Maryland Institute College of Art. 2000. ISBN 978-0-9669677-3-9.
- Me with Animal Towering. Black Square Editions. 2002. ISBN 978-0-97124-851-9.
- Letters from Mayhem, illustrated by Roger Andersson (New York: Cabinet Books, 2004). ISBN 9781932698251, 1932698256
- Touch Wood. Brooklyn Rail/Black Square Editions. 2011. ISBN 978-1-93402-916-9.

=== Anthologies ===
- Leonard Schwartz; Joseph Donahue; Edward Halsey Foster, eds. (1995). Primary trouble: an anthology of contemporary American poetry. Talisman House. ISBN 978-1-883689-28-5.
