= Dan Chiasson =

American poet

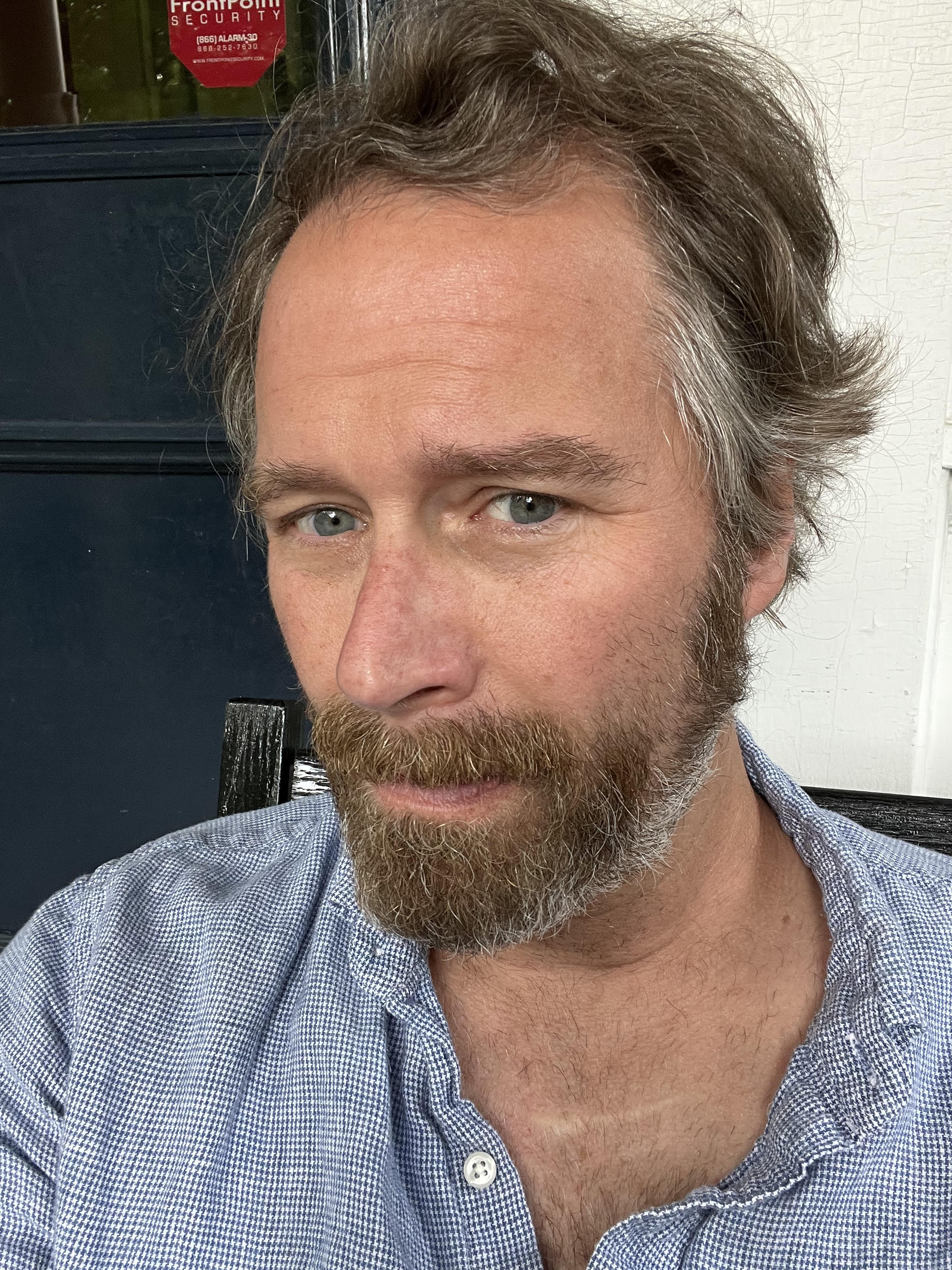
Dan Chiasson in 2024

Dan Chiasson (/ˈtʃeɪsən/; born May 9, 1971) is an American poet, critic, and journalist. The Sewanee Review called Chiasson "the country's most visible poet-critic." He is the Lorraine Chao Wang Professor of English Literature and Chair of the English Department at Wellesley College.

Chiasson is the author of seven books: The Afterlife of Objects (University of Chicago Press, 2002), Natural History (Alfred A. Knopf, 2005), One Kind of Everything: Poem and Person in Contemporary America (University of Chicago Press, 2007), Where's the Moon, There's the Moon (Alfred A. Knopf, 2010), Bicentennial (Alfred A. Knopf, 2014), The Math Campers (Alfred A. Knopf, 2020), and Bernie for Burlington: The Rise of the People's Politician.

Bernie for Burlington is a both "biography of Bernie's political rise" and a memoir of what Chiasson calls "a very unusual American experiment, a modern city run by a charismatic socialist and his smart, young administration, during the eight years when Ronald Reagan was in the White House." Chiasson added "I'm actually one of the outcomes of the experiment, and so is my book, looking back on the transformation of Burlington and the thrilling rise of Bernie and his ideas." Nicholson Baker called it "a book we need right now," a "big, lovingly-woven, Whitmanesque wicker work of grievances and glories, home truths and triumphs." Robert Pinsky praised its "wild variety of stories, voices and characters," and added "Dan Chiasson of Burlington, Vermont and American poetry is a masterful narrator."

== Life ==
Chiasson was born in Burlington, Vermont. He grew up in the city of Burlington as the only child of his single mother. He attended Catholic schools, Mater Christi School and Rice Memorial High School, from which he graduated in 1989. He graduated summa cum laude in Classics and English from Amherst College (1993), and from Harvard University, where he received a Ph.D. in English and was awarded the Whiting Foundation Award in the Humanities.

In addition to teaching at Wellesley, Chiasson has been affiliated with Boston University's Master of Fine Arts program, with NYU's program in Paris, France, and with the Middlebury College Bread Loaf Environmental Conference in Ripton, Vermont. He was a 2017 James Merrill House Fellow in Stonington, CT. He lives in Wellesley, Massachusetts, with his wife and two sons.

Chiasson is a longtime contributor to The New Yorker and The New York Review of Books. He was the poetry editor (with Meghan O'Rourke), and later advisory editor, of the Paris Review. His poems have been translated into many languages, including German by Jan Wagner. His Natural History was published as Naturgeschichte at Luxbooks, a publishing house focused on American poetry in bilingual editions. In the UK, he is published by Bloodaxe Books.

He is on the editorial board of the literary magazine The Common, based at Amherst College.

== Honors and awards ==
- 2008 Award in Literature, American Academy of Arts and Letters
- 2008 Guggenheim Fellowship for poetry
- 2004 Whiting Award

== Bibliography ==
See also links in the External links section below.

=== Poetry ===
Collections

- Chiasson, Dan (2002). The afterlife of objects. Chicago: University of Chicago Press.
- — (2007). Natural history : poems. New York: Random House.
- — (2010). Where's the moon, there's the moon : poems. New York: Alfred A. Knopf.
- — (2014). Bicentennial : poems. New York: Alfred A. Knopf.
- — (2020). The math campers : poems. New York: Alfred A. Knopf.

Anthologies

- Hix, H. L., ed. (2008). New voices : contemporary poetry from the United States. Irish Pages.

List of poems

| Title | Year | First published | Reprinted/collected |
|---|---|---|---|
| The anatomy of melancholy | 2001 | Chiasson, Dan (June 18, 2001). "The anatomy of melancholy". The New Yorker: 125. | |
| Nocturne | 2001 | Chiasson, Dan (July 23, 2001). "Nocturne". The New Yorker: 67. | |
| From 'The Names of 1,001 Strangers' | 2017 | Chiasson, Dan (May 1, 2017). "From 'The Names of 1,001 Strangers'". The New Yorker. 93 (11): 38–39. | |
| Obituary | 2014 | Chiasson, Dan (January 6, 2014). "Obituary". The New Yorker. 89 (43): 60. | |
| Self | 2000 | Chiasson, Dan (July 24, 2000). "Self". The New Yorker. 76 (20): 40. | |
| Swifts | 2008 | Chiasson, Dan (July 29, 2008). "Swifts". Poem. Slate. | |

=== History ===
- Chiasson, Dan (2026). Bernie for Burlington: The Rise of the People's Politician. Knopf. ISBN 978-0593317495.

=== Criticism ===
- Chiasson, Dan (1993). The fidgets of remembrance: three reflections on Robert Lowell's late poetry. Amherst College.
- — (2007). One kind of everything : poem and person in contemporary America. University of Chicago Press.
- — (November 3, 2008). "Works on paper : the letters of Elizabeth Bishop and Robert Lowell". The Critics. Books. The New Yorker. 98 (28): 106–110. (Note: Reviews Travisano, Thomas & Saskia Hamilton, eds. (2008). Words in air : the complete correspondence between Elizabeth Bishop and Robert Lowell. New York: Farrar, Straus & Giroux.)
- — (April 19, 2010). "Forms of attention : Don Paterson's 'Rain'". The Critics. Books. The New Yorker. 86 (9).
- — (November 2012). "The humble vernacular : a word-of-mouth dictionary". Reviews. Harper's Magazine. 325 (1950): 90–94.
- — (April 15, 2013). "End of the line : new poems from Carl Phillips". The Critics. Books. The New Yorker. 89 (9): 78–79.
- — (October 28, 2013). "The ghost writer : Lucie Brock-Broido's "Stay, Illusion"". The Critics. Books. The New Yorker. 89 (34): 78–79.
- — (February 10, 2014). "Bet the farm : Robert Frrost's turbulent apprenticeship". The Critics. Books. The New Yorker. 89 (48): 72–76.
- — (June 2, 2014). "Mother tongue : poetry and prose by Rachel Zucker". The Critics. Books. The New Yorker. 90 (15): 77–79.
- — (October 20, 2014). "View from the mountain : new poems by Louise Glück". The Critics. Books. The New Yorker. 90 (32): 95–97.
- — (April 13, 2015). "Out of this world : James Merrill's supernatural muse". The Critics. Books. The New Yorker. 91 (8): 70–74.
- — (March 21, 2016). "The tenderness trap : Robyn Schiff and the poetry of ordinary terror". The Critics. Books. The New Yorker. 92 (6): 89–90.
- — (June 20, 2016). "Boundary conditions : Adrienne Rich's collected poems". The Critics. Books. The New Yorker. 92 (18): 78–81.
- — (August 8–15, 2016). "Childhood's end : a debut about life, language, and what binds them". The Critics. Books. The New Yorker. 92 (24): 75–77. (Note: Online version is titled "Poetry of a childhood lost". Reviews Prikryl, Jana. The after party. Tim Duggan Books.)
- — (March 20, 2017). "The mania and the muse : did Robert Lowell's illness shape his work?". The Critics. Books. The New Yorker. 93 (5): 94–97. (Note: Online version is titled "The illness and insight of Robert Lowell".)
- — (December 4, 2017). "One man's trash : how A. R. Ammons turned the everyday into art". The Critics. Books. The New Yorker. 93 (39): 69–72. (Note: Online version is titled "The great American poet of daily chores".)
- — (February 11, 2019). "Song of my selves : Shane McRae's poems to America". The Critics. Books. The New Yorker. 94 (48): 68–69. (Note: Online version is titled "Shane McRae's poems to America".)
- — (June 3, 2019). "Bittersweet : Natalie Scenters-Zapico's poems evoke damage and repair". The Critics. Books. The New Yorker. 95 (15): 65–67. (Note: Online version is titled "The bittersweet poetry of 'Lima :: Limón'".)
- — (January 13, 2020). "Original recipes : appetite and anxiety in Tommy Pico's poems". The Critics. Books. The New Yorker. 95 (44): 68–69. (Note: Online version is titled "Tommy Pico filibusters mortality with poetry".)
- — (September 7, 2020). "Suspended pleasures : a month in the life of Bernadette Mayer". The Critics. Books. The New Yorker. 96 (26): 76–77. (Note: Online version is titled "Inside Bernadette Mayer's time capsule".)
- — (May 31, 2021). "Far out : what the Bolinas poets built". The Critics. Books. The New Yorker. 97 (14): 65–66. (Note: Online version is titled "What the Bolinas poets built".)

———————
