= Catherine Wagner (poet) =

American poet and academic (born 1969)

- Born: 1969 (age 56–57); Rangoon, Burma
- Occupation: Poet

Academic background
- Education: University of Tennessee at Chattanooga; University of Utah

Academic work
- Institutions: Miami University

Catherine Wagner (born 1969 in Rangoon, Burma) is an American poet and academic.

== Life ==
Wagner lived in Asia and the Middle East until 1977, when her family moved to Baltimore, Maryland. She graduated from University of Tennessee at Chattanooga, University of Iowa (MFA, 1994), and University of Utah (PhD, 2000).

Wagner is the author of Miss America (2001), Macular Hole (2004), My New Job (2009), and Nervous Device (2012).

Her work has appeared in anthologies including The Norton Anthology of Postmodern American Poetry (2012 edition), Poets on Teaching, Starting Today: Poems for Obama’s First 100 Days, Gurlesque, State of the Union: 50 Political Poems, A Best of Fence: The First Nine Years, and The Best American Erotic Poems, 1800 to the Present, Best American Experimental Writing 2015 among others.

She is professor of English at Miami University in Oxford, Ohio.

== Awards ==
- Ruth Lilly Poetry Fellowship (1990)
- Teaching-Writing Fellowship, University of Iowa, 1992-1994
- Steffensen Cannon Fellowship, University of Utah, 1997-1999

== Works ==
=== Poetry ===
- Of Course. New York: Fence Books, 2020. ISBN 978-1-944380-16-8
- Nervous Device. San Francisco: City Lights Publishers, 2012. ISBN 978-0-87286-565-5
- My New Job. New York: Fence Books, 2009. ISBN 978-1-934200-26-1
- Macular Hole. New York: Fence Books, 2004. ISBN 978-0-9740909-1-7
- Miss America. New York: Fence Books, 2001. ISBN 978-0-9663324-7-6

=== Chapbooks ===
- Bornt. Miniature handmade chapbook. Schaffhausen, Switzerland: Dusie Press, 2009.
- Articulate How. Washington, DC: Big Game Books, 2008.
- Hole in the Ground. Oxford, OH: Slack Buddha Press, 2008.
- Everyone in the Room is a Representative of the World at Large. Letterpress. Fort Collins, CO: Bonfire Press, 2007.
- Imitating. Nottingham, England: Leafe Press, 2004.
- Exercises. New York: 811 Books, 2004.
- Hotel Faust. Sheffield/Cheltenham, England: West House Books/Gratton Street Irregulars, 2001.
- Boxes. Los Angeles: Seeing Eye Books (now Mindmade Books, 2001).
- Fraction Anthems. New York: 811 Books, 1999.

=== Criticism ===
- "I Am a Poet and I Have," essay on academic labor and poetry, Poetic Labor Project, July 2012
- "Revision", Evening May Come, Issue 9, September 2011
- Selection of and commentary on previously unpublished poems by Barbara Guest, Chicago Review Barbara Guest issue
- Review of Harryette Mullen’s Recyclopedia, Chicago Review, Winter 2007

=== Editing ===
- Catherine Wagner; Rebecca Wolff, eds. (2007). Not for Mothers Only: Contemporary Poems on Child-Getting and Child-Rearing. Albany, NY: Fence Books. ISBN 978-0-9771064-8-6.
