= Alan Rifkin =

American novelist

- Occupations: Novelist; Essayist
- Years active: 2003-present

Alan Rifkin is a Southern California novelist and essayist. A former contributing editor of Details magazine, he has also written for the Los Angeles Times Magazine, Premiere, L.A. Weekly, Buzz and The Quarterly. His first book, Signal Hill, was a finalist for the 2004 Southern California Booksellers Award in Fiction. He was also a finalist for the 2003 PEN Center USA Award in Journalism. Rifkin hosts The Last We Fake, a weekly serialized fiction podcast from Los Angeles. He lives in Los Angeles.

== Trivia ==
In the TV series Action, an unknown writer named Adam Rafkin is confused with Alan Rifkin in a key plot point.
