= Sean Howe =

American journalist and writer

Sean Howe is an American journalist and writer. He is a former editor at Entertainment Weekly and The Criterion Collection. In 2012, he published the book Marvel Comics: The Untold Story, after interviewing more than 150 people who worked at or were associated with Marvel Comics.

In 2014, he won the Troféu HQ Mix (the most important Brazilian comics award) in the category "best book about comics" for the Brazilian edition of Marvel Comics: The Untold Story.
