= Janet Sarbanes =

American author and academic

- Born: Janet Matina Sarbanes; 1968 (age 57–58)
- Occupation: Author; professor
- Education: Princeton University (BA); University of California, Los Angeles (PhD)
- Parents: Paul Sarbanes; Christine Dunbar
- Relatives: John Sarbanes (brother)

Janet Matina Sarbanes (/ˈsɑːrbeɪnz/; born 1968) is an American author and a professor of creative writing and cultural studies. Her books Army of One and The Protester Has Been Released are collections of short fiction. Her book Letters on the Autonomy Project is a collection of essays exploring the relation between art and politics via the concept of autonomy. She has published numerous essays on art, aesthetics, pedagogy and communal practice.

== Education ==
Sarbanes received her BA in comparative literature from Princeton and her PhD in English from UCLA. As a Princeton undergraduate, she spearheaded a successful effort to make the words of the school's alma mater gender inclusive.

== Career ==
Sarbanes teaches creative writing and cultural studies at the California Institute of the Arts.

== Publications ==
=== Letters on the Autonomy Project ===
Letters on the Autonomy Project, framed by the thought of Cornelius Castoriadis, was published by punctum books in June 2022.

=== The Protester Has Been Released ===
The Protester Has Been Released is a collection of ten short stories and one novella. It was published by C&R Press in April 2017.

=== Army of One ===
Army of One was published by Otis Press Seismicity Editions in Los Angeles.

=== "The Shaker 'Gift' Economy" ===
Sarbanes received the Eugene Battisti Award from the Society for Utopian Studies for her essay "The Shaker 'Gift' Economy: Charisma, Aesthetic Practice and Utopian Communalism."

=== "Reframing the House of Dust" ===
Sarbanes received the Creative Capital/Andy Warhol Foundation Arts Writers Grant for her essay project "Reframing the House of Dust: A Meditation in Many Parts."

== Personal life ==
Sarbanes lives in Los Angeles. Her father was former Maryland U.S. Senator Paul Sarbanes and her brother is former U.S. Representative John Sarbanes.
