= Colección (Roy Brown album) =

Compilation album by Roy Brown
- Released: 1996
- Recorded: 1973–1996
- Genre: Nova trova, Puerto Rican folk music
- Label: Lara-Yarí
- Producer: Roy Brown

Roy Brown chronology
En Fuga (1994)	Colección (1996)	Poeta en San Juan (1998)

Colección is a two-disc compilation album from Puerto Rican singer Roy Brown. It features a collection of Brown's hits and old songs, some of them recorded live. The album was released under Brown's label Discos Lara-Yarí in 1996.

== Background and recording ==
Roy Brown describes Colección as a "self-conscious journey" through his career. He says that the album includes songs that are "favorites of the public, others favorites of mine, some forgotten and unknown, others never recorded and that had their chance, even if they never made it to the 'hit parade'".

Most of the songs on Disc one were recorded live. The first eight tracks were recorded during a concert in San Juan in 1993, while tracks nine to eleven were recorded during a presentation in Jayuya in 1992. "Mister con macana" (Track 12) was recorded for this album on E 1212 Studio in 1994. The remaining songs on the first disc ("Oubao-Moin" and "Encántigo") originated from the albums Casi Alba and Aires Bucaneros.

All of the songs on Disc two were taken from Brown's previous albums as well, like Roy Brown III, La Profecía de Urayoán, Nuyol, Árboles, and Balada de Otro Tiempo. The only exception was the song "Monón" (Track 1), which was recorded on Rubby Haddock Studio in 1996.

== Track listing ==
=== Disc one ===
All tracks are written by Roy Brown, except where noted.

No.	Title	Writer(s)	From album	Length
1.	"Mujer de sociedad"		Live at San Juan, 1993	2:44
2.	"Dime, niña"		Live at San Juan, 1993	4:26
3.	"Pa'l viejo y que adivine"		Live at San Juan, 1993	4:34
4.	"Distancias"	Juan Antonio Corretjer, Roy Brown	Live at San Juan, 1993	15:21
5.	"Balada de otro tiempo"		Live at San Juan, 1993	3:29
6.	"La bahía"		Live at San Juan, 1993	4:17
7.	"Pillo buena gente"		Live at San Juan, 1993	3:56
8.	"Seattle"		Live at San Juan, 1993	6:41
9.	"El descubrimiento"		Live at Jayuya, 1992	4:21
10.	"Boricua en la luna"	Juan Antonio Corretjer, Roy Brown	Live at Jayuya, 1992	3:44
11.	"Sal a caminar"		Live at Jayuya, 1992	4:30
12.	"Mister con macana"		New version	4:28
13.	"Oubao Moin"	Juan Antonio Corretjer, Roy Brown	Casi Alba	6:31
14.	"Encántigo"		Aires Bucaneros	5:14

=== Disc two ===
All tracks are written by Roy Brown, except where noted.

No.	Title	Writer(s)	From album	Length
1.	"Monón"		New version	5:18
2.	"Negrito bonito"		Árboles	5:17
3.	"El tema"		Taoné en Cuba	3:26
4.	"Hablando"		Roy Brown III	6:25
5.	"Oda a una generación"	Silvio Rodríguez	Roy Brown III	3:48
6.	"Canción del elegido"	Silvio Rodríguez	Roy Brown III	4:48
7.	"Te doy una canción"	Silvio Rodríguez	La Profecía de Urayoán	3:24
8.	"En la vida todo es ir"	Juan Antonio Corretjer, Roy Brown	La Profecía de Urayoán	4:15
9.	"Profecía de Urayoán"		La Profecía de Urayoán	5:09
10.	"Mamá Yoyó y las peripecias de Don Trampolín"		La Profecía de Urayoán	6:48
11.	"Compañera del silencio"		La Profecía de Urayoán	2:28
12.	"Nuyol"	Federico García Lorca, Roy Brown	Nuyol	5:42
13.	"Ayuburí"	Juan Antonio Corretjer, Roy Brown	Nuyol	3:48
14.	"Diana de Guilarte"	Juan Antonio Corretjer, Roy Brown	Nuyol	3:12
15.	"Mujer poetisa"	Roy Brown, Natasha Drootin, Carl Royce	Árboles	4:24
16.	"Inabón Yunes"	Juan Antonio Corretjer, Roy Brown	Balada de Otro Tiempo	5:30

== Personnel and credits ==
Disc one (Tracks 1–8)

- Nicky Aponte - musical direction, keyboards, violin
- Tato Santiago - piano and keyboards
- Eguie Castrillo - percussion
- Gonchi Sifre - drums
- Toni Asencio - bass
- Lissette Gregory - background vocals
- Aidita Encarnación - background vocals, co-lead on "Seattle"
- Pablito Rosario - percussion
- Pedrito Guzmán - cuatro
- Angel Morales - live sound
- Hilton Colón - recording

Disc one (Tracks 9–11)

- Nicky Aponte - keyboards, violin
- Tato Santiago - piano
- Eguie Castrillo - percussion
- Gonchi Sifre - drums
- Toni Asencio - bass
- Roy Brown - guitars
- Cholo Echevarría - live sound
- Hilton Colón - recording

Disc one (Track 12)

- Nicky Aponte - keyboards, arrangement
- Tato Santiago - piano, background vocals
- Gonchi Sifre - drums
- Toni Asencio - bass
- Freddy Camacho - percussion
- Cachete Maldonado - percussion
- Zoraida Santiago - background vocals
- Edwin Colón Zayas - cuatro
- Juancito Torres - trumpet
- Angie Machado - second trumpet
- Rafi Torres - trombone
- Angel Torres - saxophone
- Edgardo Sierra - recording

Disc one (Track 13)

- Zoraida Santiago - co-lead vocals
- Carl Royce - cuatro
- Pablo Nieves - percussion
- Harry Rodríguez - bass
- Roberto Reverón - drums
- Kevin Zambrana - recording

Disc one (Track 14)

- Carl Royce - cuatro
- Zoraida Santiago - vocals and percussion
- Pablo Nieves - percussion
- Jesús Sánchez - recording
- Frank Ferrer - production

Disc two (Track 1)

- Tato Santiago - piano, keyboards
- Gonchi Sifre - drums
- Edgardo Sierra - bass
- Freddy Camacho - percussion
- Roy Brown - guitars
- Iván González - background vocals, collective arrangement
- Víctor "Sonny" Hernández - recording, background vocals

Disc two (Tracks 2, 15)

- Pablo Milanés - co-lead vocals on "Negrito bonito"
- Anabell López - co-lead vocals on "Mujer poetisa"
- Oriente López - keyboards, arrangement
- Oscar Valdés - drums
- Ernán López-Nussa - piano
- Omar Hernández - bass
- Mario Luis Pino - percussion
- Fernando Acosta - saxophone
- Roberto García - trumpet
- Edilio Montero - trumpet and trombone
- Jerzy Belc - recording
- Silvio Rodríguez - producer

Disc two (Track 3)

- Rembert Egues - vibraphone, arrangement
- Carlos Puerto - bass
- Guillermo Barreto - drums
- Chucho Valdés - piano
- Carlos Emilio - guitars
- Oscar Valdés - percussion
- Roberto García Valdés - percussion
- Eusebio Domínguez - recording

Disc two (Tracks 5–6)

- Antonio Cabán Vale - co-lead vocals on "Oda a una generación"
- Henry Vázquez - guitars and quinto
- Rucco Gandía - bass
- Roy Brown - guitars
- Pedrito Enríquez - engineer

Disc two (Tracks 7–11)

- José González - drums and guitars
- Miguel Cubano - guitars and cuatro
- Harry Torres - bass
- Toni Fornaris - percussion
- Emiliano Salvador - piano
- Manuel Valera - soprano sax
- Pedro Téllez - recording
- German Pinelli - production

Disc two (Tracks 13–14)

- Carl Royce - cuatro
- Pablo Nieves - percussion
- Jeff Fuller - bass
- Robi Ameen - drums
- Steve Sandberg - piano
- David Rodríguez - recording

Disc two (Track 12)

- Roy Brown - guitars
- Carl Royce - cuatro
- Pablo Nieves - percussion

Disc two (Track 16)

- Rucco Gandía - bass and production
- Tato Santiago - keyboards
- Pedrito Guzmán - cuatro
- Eguie Castrillo - percussion
- Luis Juliá - guitars
- Jimmy Rivera - drums
- Roy Brown - guitars
- Hilton Colón - recording

Additional production credits

- Digital Recording Services - mastering
- Carlos Rivera - digital editing and restoration
- David Rodríguez - mastering coordination
- Rosalía Ortíz Luquis - cover design
- Ricardo Betancourt - album concept and photography
- Rafael López - photography
- Frida Medin - photography
- Paco López - photography
- José Rubén Gaztambide - photography
