= Poetas Puertorriqueños =

Compilation album by Roy Brown
- Released: 1992
- Genre: Nova trova, Puerto Rican folk music
- Label: Lara-Yarí

Roy Brown chronology
Nocturno (1991)	Poetas Puertorriqueños (1992)	En Fuga (1994)

Poetas Puertorriqueños is a compilation album from Puerto Rican singer Roy Brown. It features eleven songs from Brown's previous albums, that are based on poems from Puerto Rican writers like Luis Palés Matos and Juan Antonio Corretjer, among others. It also features a new, unreleased song titled "Ay, ay, ay de la grifa negra", based on a poem by Julia de Burgos. The album was released under Brown's label Discos Lara-Yarí in 1992. The album was also sponsored by the Puerto Rican Committee for the Celebration of the 500th Anniversary of the Discovery of Puerto Rico.

== Track listing ==
No.	Title	Writer(s)	From album	Length
1.	"Ohé Nené"	Luis Palés Matos, Roy Brown	Árboles
2.	"Pueblo negro"	Luis Palés Matos, Roy Brown	Balada de Otro Tiempo
3.	"Aires bucaneros"	Luis Palés Matos, Roy Brown	Aires Bucaneros
4.	"Árboles"	Clemente Soto Vélez, Roy Brown	Árboles
5.	"Caballo de palo"	Clemente Soto Vélez, Roy Brown	Aires Bucaneros
6.	"Oubao-Moin"	Juan Antonio Corretjer, Roy Brown	Distancias en Vivo
7.	"Inabón Yunes"	Juan Antonio Corretjer, Roy Brown	Balada de Otro Tiempo
8.	"Ahora me despido"	Juan Antonio Corretjer, Roy Brown	Aires Bucaneros
9.	"Melena al viento"	Luis Lloréns Torres, Roy Brown	Balada de Otro Tiempo
10.	"Ay, ay, ay de la grifa negra"	Julia de Burgos, Roy Brown	New song
11.	"Encántigo"	Roy Brown	Balada de Otro Tiempo
12.	"Negrito bonito"	Roy Brown	Árboles

== Personnel ==
=== Musicians ===
- Anabell López - vocals on "Ohé Nené"
- Pablo Milanés - vocals on "Negrito bonito"
