= Nocturno (Roy Brown album) =

Studio album by Roy Brown
- Released: 1991
- Genre: Nova trova, Puerto Rican folk music
- Label: Lara-Yarí

Roy Brown chronology
Distancias en Vivo (1990)	Nocturno (1991)	Poetas Puertorriqueños (1991)

Nocturno is a studio album from Puerto Rican singer Roy Brown with the band Radio Pirata. The album was released under Brown's label Discos Lara-Yarí in 1991.

== Background and recording ==
Nocturno was recorded at Horizon Music Studios in San Juan, Puerto Rico. Roy Brown was accompanied by the group Radio Pirata, led by Rucco Gandía. Gandía himself contributed the song "Mujer sola". Although the backing vocals appears the names of singers Lunna & Ex Menudo Ray Reyes, both of them were substituted by Gilda Gónzalez & Raül Reyes ( Ray’s Brother ) who became Radio Pirata’s Lead Vocalist. The album also features the fifth Roy Brown song based on a poem by Luis Palés Matos, and the third based on a poem by Clemente Soto Vélez. There's also a song written by Puerto Rican writer Pedro Cabiya. The song "La borrachera de Charles Baudelaire" is based on the writings of the French poet of the same name.

== Track listing ==
All tracks are written by Roy Brown, except where noted.

No.	Title	Writer(s)	Length
1.	"La bahía"
2.	"Quédate un ratito más"
3.	"Música antigua"
4.	"Encántigo"
5.	"El descubimiento"
6.	"Misterio del bosque en llamas"
7.	"La borrachera de Charles Baudelaire"	Charles Baudelaire, Roy Brown
8.	"Mujer sola"	Rucco Gandía
9.	"Cuerno, trenza, fardo, esas cosas"	Pedro Cabiya, Roy Brown
10.	"Nocturno"	Luis Palés Matos, Roy Brown
11.	"Estrella de cinco puntas"	Clemente Soto Vélez, Roy Brown
