= Aires Bucaneros =

Studio album by Roy Brown
- Released: 1979
- Recorded: January 1979
- Genre: Nova trova, Puerto Rican folk music
- Label: Lara-Yarí

Roy Brown chronology
Distancias (1977)	Aires Bucaneros (1979)	Casi Alba (1980)

Aires Bucaneros is the sixth album from Puerto Rican folk singer Roy Brown, and his first with the group Aires Bucaneros. The album was released under Brown's label Discos Lara-Yarí in 1979.

== Background and recording ==
Roy Brown moved to New York City in 1976 where he founded the group Aires Bucaneros, with Zoraida Santiago, Carl Royce, and Pablo Nieves. Their first album together, bearing the same name, was recorded during the month of January 1979 at Televicentro Sound Inc. in San Juan, Puerto Rico.

The album features Brown's adaptations of several popular poems. Two of the songs are based on poems from Juan Antonio Corretjer. It also features the song "Caballo de palo", which is based on a poem by nationalist Clemente Soto Vélez. The album also features Miguel Cubano's adaptation of a poem by Hugo Margenat on the song "Vendrás". Brown had previously adapted one of Margenat's poems on Roy Brown III. "Bailando con los negros" is based on a poem by Pablo Neruda. The title song is based on a poem by Luis Palés Matos. Lead singer Zoraida Santiago also contributed with the song "Prisa loca".

Brown has said in interviews that he considers this to be his best album.

== Re-release ==
Aires Bucaneros and its follow-up, Casi Alba, were re-released in 1993 as a double CD.

== Track listing ==
All tracks are written by Roy Brown, except where noted.

No.	Title	Writer(s)	Length
1.	"Caballo de palo"	Clemente Soto Vélez, Roy Brown
2.	"Serenata"	Juan Antonio Corretjer, Roy Brown
3.	"Vendrás"	Hugo Margenat, Roy Brown
4.	"Noches de Santiago"
5.	"Bailando con los negros"	Pablo Neruda, Roy Brown
6.	"Encántigo"
7.	"Prisa loca"	Zoraida Santiago
8.	"Aires bucaneros"	Luis Palés Matos, Roy Brown
9.	"Ahora me despido"	Juan Antonio Corretjer, Roy Brown

== Personnel ==
=== Musicians ===
- Zoraida Santiago - vocals
- Carl Royce - cuatro
- Pablo Nieves - percussion
- Carlos Bedoya - cuatro on Track 9

=== Production and recording ===
- Jesús Sánchez - recording
- Frank Ferrer - production
