= En Fuga =

Studio album by Roy Brown
- Released: 1994
- Genre: Nova trova, Puerto Rican folk music
- Label: Lara-Yarí

Roy Brown chronology
Poetas Puertorriqueños (1991)	En Fuga (1994)	Colección (1996)

Juancito Torres

En Fuga is a studio album from Puerto Rican singer Roy Brown. The album was released under Brown's label Discos Lara-Yarí in 1994.

== Background ==
Most of the songs were written by Roy Brown, with the exception of "Fuga de música en vaivén" and "Poema de yin y yang". The first song was written in collaboration with Tato Santiago, while the second one is based on writings of Michael Blumenthal.

== Track listing ==
All tracks are written by Roy Brown, except where noted.

No.	Title	Writer(s)	Length
1.	"Asi es mi vida"
2.	"El fantasma"
3.	"Menú"	Luis Palés Matos, Roy Brown
4.	"Cosa de un mal día"
5.	"Fuga de música en vaivén"	Roy Brown, Tato Santiago
6.	"Despertó Tuntuneco"
7.	"Triste alegre"
8.	"Mister con macana"
9.	"Poema de yin y yang"	Michael Blumenthal, Roy Brown
10.	"El profeta"

== Personnel ==
=== Musicians ===
- Zoraida Santiago - vocals on "El profeta"
- Freddy Camacho
- Tato Santiago
- Toni Asencio
- Gonchi Sifre
- Nicky Aponte
- Cachete Maldonado
- Wichi Camacho
- Jerry Medina
- Edwin Colón Zayas
- Juancito Torres
- Angie Machado
- Rafi Torres
- Ángel Torres.
