= Árboles =

Studio album by Roy Brown, Silvio Rodríguez and Afrocuba
- Released: 1987
- Recorded: January to February 1987
- Genre: Nova trova, Puerto Rican folk music
- Label: Lara-Yarí

Roy Brown, Silvio Rodríguez and Afrocuba chronology
| Nuyol (1983) | Árboles (1987) | Balada de Otro Tiempo (1989) |

Árboles is an album from Puerto Rican singer Roy Brown and Cuban singer Silvio Rodríguez, along with Cuban septet Afrocuba. Brown and Rodríguez has collaborated previously, but this is the first album where they are billed together.

== Background and recording ==
Árboles was recorded from January to February 1987 at EGREM Studios in Havana, Cuba. It features five songs by Roy Brown, and two songs by Rodríguez. The last song, "Árboles", is sung by Brown and Rodríguez together. It is based on a poem by Clemente Soto Vélez. The album also features singing contributions from Cubans Pablo Milanés (on "Negrito bonito") and Anabell López (on "Ohé Nené"). This album is also notable for featuring the first version of "Boricua en la luna", which has probably become Brown's most popular song.

== Track listing ==
| No. | Title | Writer(s) | Length |
|---|---|---|---|
| 1. | "Esta noche" | Roy Brown |
| 2. | "Si tengo un hermano" | Silvio Rodríguez |
| 3. | "Mujer poetisa" | Roy Brown, Natasha Drootin, Carl Royce |
| 4. | "Negrito bonito (with Pablo Milanés)" | Roy Brown |
| 5. | "Con un poco de amor" | Silvio Rodríguez |
| 6. | "Ohé Nené (with Anabell López)" | Luis Palés Matos, Roy Brown |
| 7. | "Boricua en la luna" | Juan Antonio Corretjer, Roy Brown |
| 8. | "Árboles" | Clemente Soto Vélez, Roy Brown |

== Personnel ==
=== Musicians ===
- Pablo Milanés - vocals on Track 4
- Anabell López - vocals on Track 6

=== Afrocuba ===
- Oriente López
- Óscar Valdés
- Ernán López-Nussa
- Fernando "Teo" Calveiro
- Fernando Acosta
- Marios Luis Pino
- Ómar Hernández
- Edilio Montero
