= Casi Alba =

Studio album by Roy Brown
- Released: 1980
- Recorded: July to September 1980
- Genre: Nova trova, Puerto Rican folk music
- Label: Lara-Yarí

Roy Brown chronology
Aires Bucaneros (1979)	Casi Alba (1980)	Nuyol (1983)

Casi Alba is the seventh album from Puerto Rican folk singer Roy Brown, and his second with the group Aires Bucaneros. The album was released under Brown's label Discos Lara-Yarí in 1980.

== Background and recording ==
Casi Alba was recorded from July to September 1980 at Latin Sound Studios in New York City. The album features writing contributions from Brown and the other members of Aires Bucaneros, notably Zoraida Santiago. The title song is based on a poem by Julia de Burgos. It also features a second version of Oubao Moin, in which Santiago shares the lead vocals with Brown.

== Re-release ==
Aires Bucaneros and Casi Alba were re-released in 1993 as a double CD.

== Track listing ==
All tracks are written by Roy Brown, except where noted.

No.	Title	Writer(s)	Length
1.	"De la tierra en que nací"	Zoraida Santiago	4:20
2.	"Flor de Caimito"		4:30
3.	"Canción para Vieques"	Zoraida Santiago	3:22
4.	"Jinete de Junio"		5:20
5.	"Hoy Mi Canción"	Nestín González	3:25
6.	"Taimbol"	Carl Royce	4:45
7.	"Casi alba"	Julia de Burgos, Zoraida Santiago	3:00
8.	"Oubao Moin"	Juan Antonio Corretjer, Roy Brown	6:30

== Personnel ==
=== Musicians ===
- Zoraida Santiago - vocals
- Carl Royce - cuatro
- Pablo Nieves - percussion
- Roberto Reverón - drums
- Harry Rodríguez - bass
- Jon Royce
- Carlos Santiago - piano on Track 6

=== Recording and production ===
- Kevin Zambrana - recording
