= Nuyol =

Studio album by Roy Brown
- Released: 1983
- Recorded: October to November 1983
- Genre: Nova trova, Puerto Rican folk music
- Label: Lara-Yarí

Roy Brown chronology
Casi Alba (1980)	Nuyol (1983)	Árboles (1987)

Nuyol is the eighth album from Puerto Rican folk singer Roy Brown. The album was released under Brown's label Discos Lara-Yarí in 1983.

== Background and recording ==
Nuyol was recorded from October to November 1983 at Eurosound and Latin Sound Studios in New York City. The title of the album and its eponymous song, which refers to New York City, comes from a poem from Federico García Lorca. The album also features Brown's second adaptation of a Luis Palés Matos poem in "Ohé Nené". Like in previous Brown albums, there are two songs based on poems from Juan Antonio Corretjer: "Diana de Guilarte" and "Ayuburí". There are also writing contributions from American writers and activists Langston Hughes and June Jordan in "Drum" and "Now you know" respectively. Both songs are in English, as well as "The Drums of Monimbó", penned by Brown. This is the first album from him to feature songs in English.

== Track listing ==
All tracks are written by Roy Brown, except where noted.

No.	Title	Writer(s)	Length
1.	"Ohé Nené"	Luis Palés Matos, Roy Brown
2.	"Nuyol"	Federico García Lorca, Roy Brown
3.	"Ayuburí"	Juan Antonio Corretjer, Roy Brown
4.	"Caribe Kid de Chambers"
5.	"Diana de Guilarte"	Juan Antonio Corretjer, Roy Brown
6.	"Drum"	Langston Hughes, Roy Brown
7.	"The drums of Monimbó"
8.	"Now you know"	June Jordan, Roy Brown
9.	"Aymará Yumbé"

== Personnel ==
=== Musicians ===
- Roy Brown - guitars
- Carl Royce - cuatro
- Pablo Nieves - percussion
- Jeff Fuller - bass
- Robert "Robi" Ameen - drums
- Steve Sandberg - piano
- Cecilia Engelhart

=== Recording and production ===
- David Rodríguez - recording
