= Hugo Margenat =

Puerto Rican politician and independence advocate

- Noted poet and founder of the "Federación de Universitarios Pro Independencia" (FUPI)
- Born: October 10, 1933; San Juan, Puerto Rico
- Died: April 7, 1957 (aged 23); San Juan, Puerto Rico
- Political party: Puerto Rican Nationalist Party
- Movement: Puerto Rican Independence

Hugo Margenat (October 10, 1933 – April 7, 1957) was a Puerto Rican poet and Puerto Rican Independence advocate. His art was committed to serving a militant nationalistic agenda. He was the founder of the political youth pro-independence organizations "Acción Juventud Independentista" (Pro-independence Youth Action) and the "Federación de Universitarios Pro Independencia" (University Pro-Independence Federation of Puerto Rico).

== Early years ==
Margenat lived during an era in Puerto Rico which was full of political turmoil. The island, which Spain ceded to the United States after the Spanish–American War was governed by an American appointed governor in accordance to the Treaty of Paris of 1898. Puerto Ricans were denied the right to elect a Puerto Rican governor until 1949, when Luis Muñoz Marín became the first Puerto Rican to be elected into said position.

== Influential political events ==
Various events took place in Puerto Rico during the 1930s thru the 1950s, involving the Puerto Rican Nationalist Party and the local government which influenced Margenat's political views and his way of thinking. The Río Piedras massacre on October 24, 1935, a confrontation with police at University of Puerto Rico campus in Río Piedras, in which 4 Nationalist partisans and one policeman were killed. On February 23, 1936, two Nationalists named Hiram Rosado and Elías Beauchamp, were arrested, transported to police headquarters, and executed within hours without trial for the murder of U.S. appointed Police Chief Francis Riggs. No policeman was ever tried or indicted for their deaths. On March 21, 1937, a peaceful march organized in the southern city of Ponce by the Puerto Rican Nationalist Party turned into a bloody event when the Insular Police ("a force somewhat resembling the National Guard of the typical U.S. state" and which answered to the U.S.-appointed governor Blanton Winship) opened fire upon what a U.S. Congressman and others reported were unarmed and defenseless cadets and bystanders alike killing 19 and badly wounding over 200 more, many in their backs while running away. An ACLU report declared it a massacre and it has since been known as the Ponce massacre. The march had been organized to commemorate the ending of slavery in Puerto Rico by the governing Spanish National Assembly in 1873, and to protest the incarceration by the U.S. government of nationalist leader Pedro Albizu Campos. Soon thereafter, the leadership of the Nationalist party, including Pedro Albizu Campos, were arrested and incarcerated for conspiracy to overthrow the government of the United States.

On May 21, 1948, a bill was introduced before the Puerto Rican Senate which would restrain the rights of the independence and nationalist movements on the archipelago. The Senate, which at the time was controlled by the Partido Popular Democrático (PPD) and presided by Luis Muñoz Marín, approved the bill. This bill, which resembled the anti-communist Smith Act passed in the United States in 1940, became known as the Ley de la Mordaza (Gag Law, technically "Law 53 of 1948") when the U.S.-appointed governor of Puerto Rico, Jesús T. Piñero, signed it into law on June 10, 1948. Under this new law it became a crime to print, publish, sell, or exhibit any material intended to paralyze or destroy the insular government; or to organize any society, group or assembly of people with a similar destructive intent. It made it illegal to sing a patriotic song, and reinforced the 1898 law that had made it illegal to display the Flag of Puerto Rico, with anyone found guilty of disobeying the law in any way being subject to a sentence of up to ten years imprisonment, a fine of up to US$10,000 (equivalent to $134,000 in 2025), or both. According to Dr. Leopoldo Figueroa, a non-PPD member of the Puerto Rico House of Representatives, the law was repressive and was in violation of the First Amendment of the US Constitution which guarantees Freedom of Speech. He pointed out that the law as such was a violation of the civil rights of the people of Puerto Rico.

== Nationalism ==
At a young age Margenat became a follower of Pedro Albizu Campos and the ideals of the Puerto Rican Nationalist Party. In 1950, Puerto Ricans were sent by the United States War Department to fight in the Korean War. Those who were eligible and who did not volunteer into the military were drafted (conscription) as a result of the Jones-Shafroth Act. Among those who were drafted into the United States Army against his wishes was 18-year-old Margenat. During his tour of duty he witnessed that Puerto Ricans suffered high casualties and that there were communication problems between largely white, English-speaking officers and Spanish-speaking Puerto Rican enlisted men. To this effect he wrote the poem "Mundo abierto" (Open world) in 1956 where he also makes reference to the bombardment of the town of Jayuya by the military during Jayuya Uprising led by Nationalist leader Blanca Canales, one of the many nationalist revolts which occurred in Puerto Rico on October 30, 1950.

Mundo Abierto (Open world)

Spanish (original version)	English translation
Soldado: asesino de la patria Hombre, rechaza el uniforme que denigra. Yo sé de miles de botas que se hunden en la tierra nuestra, destrozándola.	Soldier: murderer of the fatherland Man, reject the uniform that defames. I know of thousands of boots that sink in our land, destroying it.
Yo sé de la marinería borracha y sádica que como una avalancha de blanco estiércol se riega por calles y plazas vomitando su negro sello de piratas.	I know about the sadistic and drunken seamanship that as an avalanche of white manure spreads through the streets and plazas vomiting its black seal of pirates.
Yo sé de los aviones que ametrallaron nuestros tejados en un día de octubre. Aquel horrible desprecio que llovía en fuego sembrando dolores profundos.	I know of the airplanes that machine-gunned our rooftops in a day of October. That horrible contempt that rained in fire sowing deep pains.
No olvides que la luz no pudo ser ocultada y a su calor la patria suspiró transformándose como un rojo beso en el abrazo azul y desnudo del aire. Sepa usted, Mundo abierto	Do not you forget that the light could not be hidden and from its heat the fatherland sighed transforming like a red kiss in the naked and blue hug of the air. Know this, Open World

In 1956, Margenat enrolled in the University of Puerto Rico at Río Piedras. He continued his political activism during his student years and in April founded the pro-independence organization "Acción Juventud Independentista" (Pro-independence Youth Action) which he presided and in October of that same year he founded another pro-independence organization, "Federación de Universitarios Pro Independencia" (FUPI) (University Pro-Independence Federation of Puerto Rico) and served as its vice president. His father, Alfredo Margenat became concerned of the younger Margenat's political activism and warned him that his actions may have a negative effect on his university education and his future as a poet, writer and citizen. However, with due time the senior Margenat was to become an admirer of his sons commitments.

== Written works ==
Margenat's written works broke with the metaphysical approach of the transcendentalist poets who dominated the literary scene in the 1940s. His poem "Living Poetry" is cited and used as an example of the poetic term "Personification", a kind of metaphor in which a nonhuman thing or quality is talked about as if it were human, by Handbook of Literary Terms. The following is a selected list of some of his poems.

- Primeros poemas (Vislumbres) (1950–1951) "First poems"
- Breves palabras de las horas prietas (1952–1953) "Brief words of the dark hours"
- Estancia Oscura (1952–1957) "Dark stay"
- Vibraciones de aire y tierra (1953–1954) "Vibrations of air and earth"
- Ventana hacia lo último (1953–1956) "Window toward the last thing"
- Lámpara apagada (1954) "Extinguished lamp"
- Intemperie (1955) "Elements"
- Mundo abierto (1956) "Open world"
- Erosavia
- Las horas de la tierra "The hours of the land"
- Tres voces de la sangre "Three voices of the blood"
- Llama de cielo roto "Flames of the broken sky"
- Los brazos y el mundo (1933–1957) "The arms and the world"

== Legacy ==
On April 7, 1957, Margenat at the age of 24 years died of Tuberculous meningitis in his house in San Juan, Puerto Rico. He was buried at the Cementerio Municipal (Municipal Cemetery) San Jose in Villa Palmeras Santurce, Puerto Rico. In 1957, poet Ana Hilda Garrastegui Pellicia wrote a set of poems about Margenat entitled "Siete Poemas a Hugo Margenat" His mother María Cristina Mediavilla, donated a collection of his written works to the Institute of Puerto Rican Culture which, under the direction of Puerto Rican poet José Manuel Torres Santiago, were published in 1974 under the title "Obras Completas" (Complete Works). Torres Santiago produced a recording in which Margenat read a selection of his own poems. Among the books written about Margenat are "Hugo Margenat: poeta agónico" by Dr. Ramón Felipe Medina and "Extinguished lamp: letters to Hugo Margenat, Puerto Rican poet, 1933–1957" by John Ridland. His poems have served as the inspiration for various songs. Among those are Puerto Rican singer Roy Brown's "Al frente" which was recorded in the album Roy Brown III. and Miguel Cubano's "Vendrás", recorded in the album Aires Bucaneros

== See also ==
- Puerto Rican Nationalist Party Revolts of the 1950s
- List of Puerto Ricans
- List of Puerto Rican writers
- Puerto Rican literature
