= Puerto Rican literature =

From oral story telling to its present-day

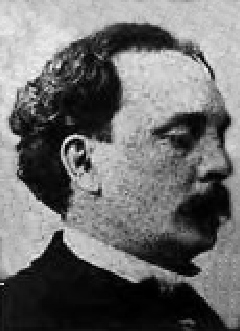
Tapia y Rivera

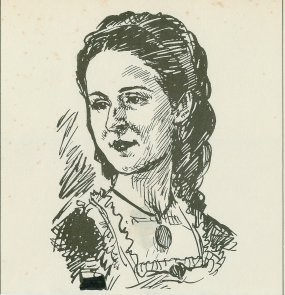
Benítez de Gautier

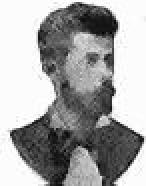
Gautier Benítez

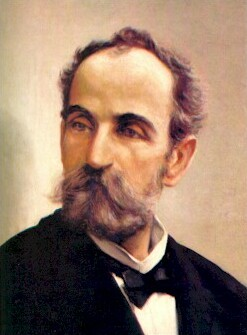
de Hostos

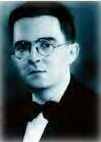
Pedreira

Puerto Rican literature is the body of literature produced by writers of Puerto Rican descent. It evolved from the art of oral storytelling. Written works by the indigenous inhabitants of Puerto Rico were originally prohibited and repressed by the Spanish colonial government.

It was not until the late 19th century, with the arrival of the first printing press and the founding of the Royal Academy of Belles Letters, that Puerto Rican literature began to flourish. The first writers to express their political views in regard to Spanish colonial rule of the island were journalists. After the United States invaded Puerto Rico during the Spanish–American War and the island was ceded to the United States as a condition of the Treaty of Paris of 1898, writers and poets began to express their opposition of the new colonial rule by writing about patriotic themes.

With the Puerto Rican diaspora of the early and mid-20th century, and the subsequent rise of the Nuyorican Movement, Puerto Rican literature continued to evolve and many Puerto Ricans have distinguished themselves as authors, poets, novelists, playwrights, and essayists.

== Early history ==
The development of Puerto Rican literature was hampered by the Spanish colonial government, which ruled over Puerto Rico since the early 1500s. The Spanish feared that, through literature, Puerto Rico would develop its own social and cultural identity and eventually seek independence. Written works by the indigenous inhabitants were prohibited and punishable by prison or banishment. Even though the first library in Puerto Rico was established in 1642, in the Convent of San Francisco, access to its books was limited to those who belonged to the religious order. The only people who had access to the libraries and who could afford books were either appointed Spanish government officials or wealthy land owners. The poor had to resort to oral story-telling in what are traditionally known in Puerto Rico as Coplas and Decimas.

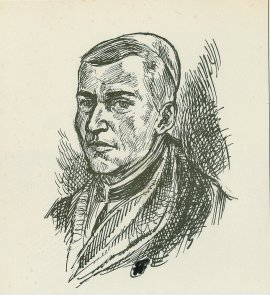
Father Diego de Torres Vargas

The island's first writers were commissioned by the Spanish Crown to document the chronological history of the island. Among these writers were Father Diego de Torres Vargas, who wrote about the history of Puerto Rico, Father Francisco Ayerra de Santa María, who wrote poems about religious and historical themes, and Juan Ponce de León II, who was commissioned to write a general description of the West Indies.

The first native-born Puerto Rican governor, Ponce de León II, wrote about Taíno culture, particularly their religious ceremonies and language. He also documented the early exploits of the conquistadors. These works were sent to the National Archives in Sevilla, Spain, where they were kept.

Puerto Rican literary history changed with the arrival of the first printing press from Mexico, in 1806. That same year Juan Rodríguez Calderón (a Spaniard) wrote and published the first book in the island, titled Ocios de la Juventud. In 1851, the Spanish appointed governor of Puerto Rico, Juan de la Pezuela Cevallo, founded the Royal Academy of Belles Letters. This institution contributed greatly to the intellectual and literary progress of the island. The school licensed primary school teachers, formulated school methods, and held literary contests. However, only those with government positions and the wealthy benefited from the formation of the institution. The first Puerto Rican writers came from some of the island's wealthiest families, and they were critical of the injustices of the Spanish Crown.

== 19th century ==
In 1806, the Spanish Colonial Government established "La Gaceta de Puerto Rico" (The Puerto Rico Gazette), Puerto Rico's first newspaper. The newspaper was biased in favor of the ideals of the government.

The first written works in Puerto Rico were influenced by the Romanticism of the time. Journalists were the first writers to express their political views in the newspapers of the day and later in books. Through their books and novels, they illuminated social injustices, which included slavery and poverty. Many of these writers were considered to be dangerous liberals by the colonial government and were banished from the island. An example of this treatment was poet and journalist Francisco Gonzalo Marín, who wrote against the Spanish Crown. Some went to the Dominican Republic, Cuba or New York City where they continued to write about patriotic themes while in exile. The literature of these writers helped fuel the desire of some to revolt against the Spanish government in Puerto Rico, resulting in the failed attempt known as the Grito de Lares in 1868.

The period between 1868 and 1898 was crucial to the development of Puerto Rican institutions and the birth of a national arts and culture: there was a pro-independence rebellion, colonial reform, the formation of national political parties, the abolition of slavery (in 1873), and a brief period of autonomy. These events coincide with the promotion of a national culture expressed through literary language, music, architecture, and other arts.

When the United States invaded Puerto Rico during the Spanish–American War in 1898, many members of the Puerto Rican literary class welcomed them, believing that eventually Puerto Rico would be granted independence. Instead, the island was declared a territory of the United States. Many writers and poets expressed their opposition by writing about patriotic themes through their work.

== Twentieth-century migration to the United States ==
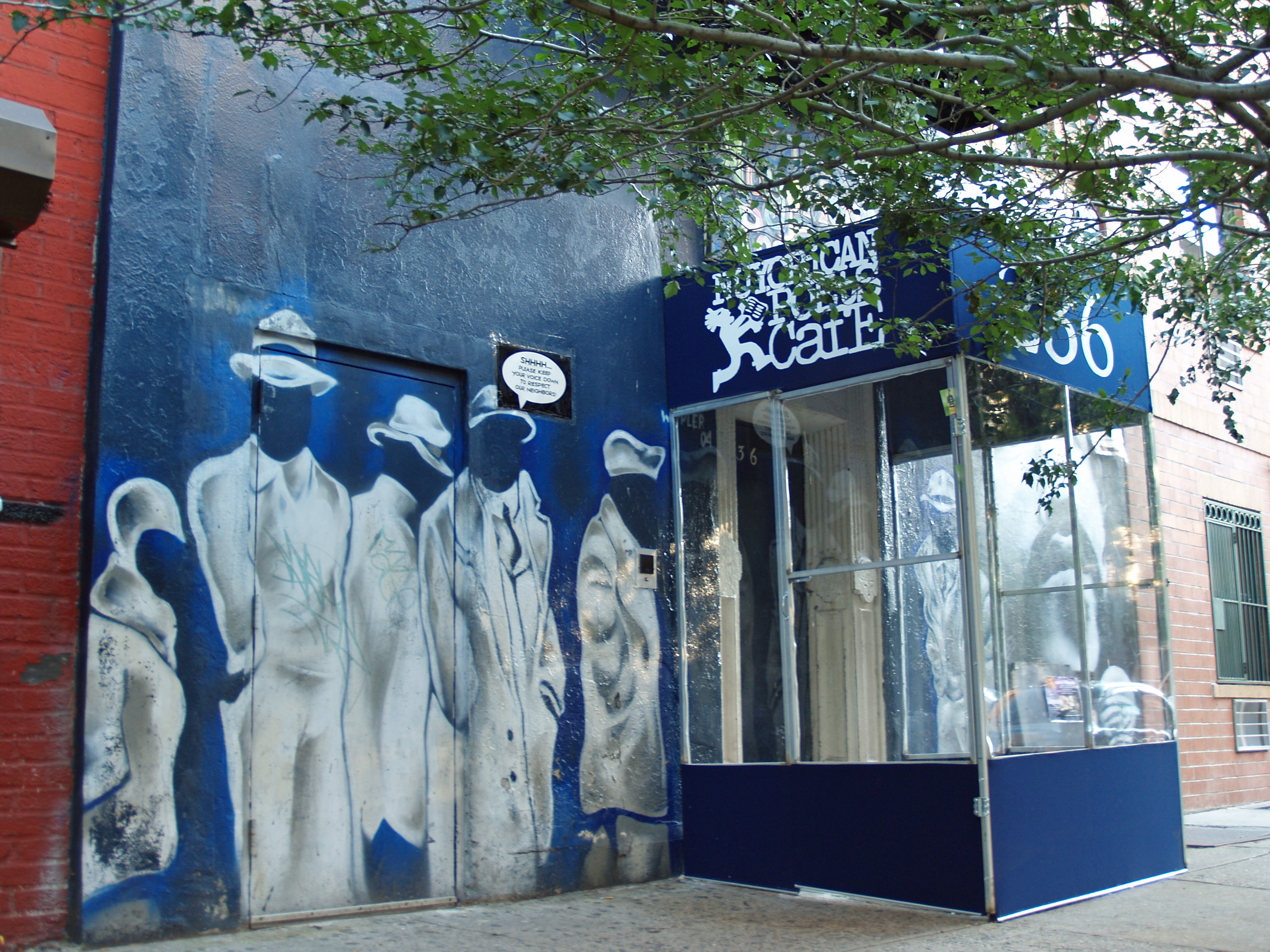
The Nuyorican Poets Café building on East 3rd street

During the early part of the 20th century, many Puerto Ricans moved to the eastern coast and mid-western parts of the United States in search of a better way of life. Most settled in cities such as New York and Chicago. There they faced ethnic and racial discrimination and other hardships. Jesús Colón, known as the father of the Nuyorican Movement, was discriminated against because he was Black and had difficulty speaking English. He wrote about his experiences, as well as the experiences of other immigrants, becoming among the first Puerto Ricans to do so in English.

One of his works, A Puerto Rican in New York, preceded the literary movement known as the "Nuyorican Movement". Ultimately, the Nuyorican Movement significantly influenced Puerto Rican literature, spurring themes such as cultural identity and discrimination. The goal of the Nuyorican Movement is to maintain the cultural identity of the Puerto Rican people in a foreign land. This circle of intellectuals, writers, poets and playwrights express their experiences as Nuyoricans living in the United States, including those whose works eventually found mainstream audiences and scholarly attention: Nicholasa Mohr (El Bronx Remembered), Piri Thomas (Down These Mean Streets), Pedro Pietri (The Masses are Asses), Giannina Braschi (Yo-Yo Boing!), Esmeralda Santiago (When I Was Puerto Rican), and others.

== Foundational fiction ==
Dr. Manuel Zeno Gandía

Prominent 19th century Puerto Rican authors include Manuel A. Alonso, author of El Gíbaro (1849), a collection of verses whose main themes were the poor Puerto Rican country farmer. Eugenio María de Hostos wrote La peregrinación de Bayoán (1863), which used Bartolomé de las Casas as a spring board to reflect on Caribbean identity. After this first novel, Hostos abandoned fiction in favor of the essay which he saw as offering greater possibilities for inspiring social change.

Alejandro Tapia y Rivera ushered in a new age of historiography with the publication of The Historical Library of Puerto Rico. Cayetano Coll y Toste published a historical work that illuminated Taínos culture in The Indo-Antillano Vocabulary is valuable. Manuel Zeno Gandía (1894) wrote La Charca about the mountainous coffee regions in Puerto Rico. Antonio S. Pedreira, described in his work Insularismo the cultural survival of the Puerto Rican identity after the U.S. invasion.

A trend in Puerto Rican fiction to narrate urban stories and novels about migration and displacement is jettisoned by Puerto Rican authors who themselves migrate to New York City, including Edgardo Vega Yunqué, author of Omaha Bigelow and Blood Fugues; Giannina Braschi, author of Yo-Yo Boing! and United States of Banana; Pedro Juan Soto, author of Spiks; and Manuel Ramos Otero, author of "Loca la de la locura."

== Poetry ==
=== Early poetry ===
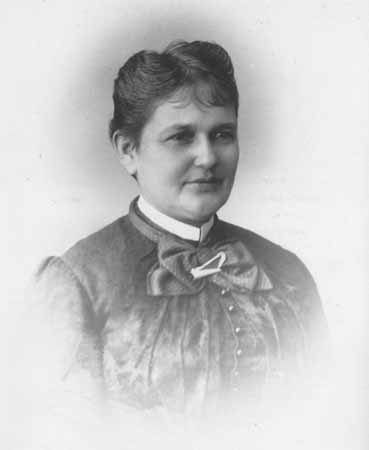
Lola Rodríguez de Tió

María Bibiana Benítez published her first poem "La Ninfa de Puerto Rico" in 1832. Her niece was Alejandrina Benítez de Gautier, whose "Aguinaldo Puertorriqueño," published in 1843, gave her the recognition of being one of the island's great poets. Alejandrina's son José Gautier Benítez is considered by many to be Puerto Rico's greatest Romantic-era poet. Lola Rodríguez de Tió wrote the lyrics to "La Borinqueña," which was used by the revolutionists in the Grito de Lares. Poets José de Diego, Virgilio Dávila, Luis Lloréns Torres, Nemesio Canales, Francisco Matos Paoli, Juan Antonio Corretjer, Clemente Soto Vélez and Hugo Margenat were independence advocates who wrote poems with patriotic inspired themes.

=== Nationalism ===
In 1928, Soto Vélez, along with Alfredo Margenat (father of Hugo Margenat), Pedro Carrasquillo, Graciany Miranda Archilla, Fernando González Alberti, Luis Hernández Aquino, Samuel Lugo, Juan Calderón Escobar, and Antonio Cruz Nieves founded the group "El Atalaya de los Dioses," which launched the literary movement known as "Atalayismo." The "El Grupo Atalaya" movement sought to connect the poetic/literary world with political action and most of its members, including Soto Vélez became involved with the Puerto Rican Nationalist Party. Giannina Braschi's postmodern work United States of Banana (2011) addresses the history of Puerto Rico decolonization efforts and declares the independence of Puerto Rico.

=== Universal lyricism ===
Mercedes Negrón Muñoz wrote under the name "Clara Lair" and published "Arras de Cristal" (1937), which describes the everyday struggles of the Puerto Rican. However, it was Julia de Burgos who was to be considered by many as one of the greatest poets to be born in Puerto Rico and who later lived in New York. The inspiration spurred by her love of Puerto Rico is reflected in her poem "Río Grande de Loíza". Other important lyric poets of the early twentieth century include Luis Palés Matos, Luis Lloréns Torres, and Evaristo Ribera Chevremont.

After the Spanish Civil War, poets Juan Ramón Jiménez (Nobel Laureate, 1956) and his wife Zenobia Camprubí emigrate to Puerto Rico and settle in Juan Juan in 1946. Jiménez's lyrical, philosophical poems influenced major Puerto Rican-born writers such as Giannina Braschi (Empire of Dreams, 1988), Manuel Ramos Otero (El Libro de la Muerte, 1985), and René Marqués (La Carreta, 1950).

Evaristo Ribera Chevremont's verses deal with nationality, folklore and regionalism, but also touch upon universal lyricism. Victor Hernández Cruz became the first Hispanic poet to be published by a mainstream publishing house (Random House) with the collection Snaps, in 1969.

== Playwrights ==
External audio
- You may view and listen to Act 1 - Part 1 of René Marqués' ""La Carreta"".

Among the major figures in Puerto Rican theater is René Marqués (1919-1979 ) author of The Oxcart (La Carreta), which dramatizes the hardships of a Puerto Rican family who move from the island to New York City. His prose contributions include El Puertorriqueño Dócil y Otros Ensayos. Francisco Arriví (1915–2007), a prominent voice of Puerto Rican theater, developed a dramatic style known as Areyto and authored "Bolero y plena" (1958) and Vejigantes. He helped to establish various theater festivals and the Centro de Bellas Artes Luis A. Ferré (Luis A. Ferré Performing Arts Center) in Puerto Rico.

Luis Rafael Sánchez (1936-) wrote Pasión según Antígona Pérez (The Passion According to Antigona Perez), a tragedy based on the life of Olga Viscal Garriga.

Among the Puerto Rican experimental theater writers is Giannina Braschi whose dramatic dialogues celebrate Puerto Rican artistic expression and acknowledge the works of her compatriots Luis Palés Matos, Nilita Vientos, Luis Pales Matos, Pedro Pietri, and Julia de Burgos. Braschi's work United States of Banana, which features Hamlet and Zarathustra on a mission to liberate Puerto Rico, was staged at the Shapiro Theater in New York City (2015).

Emerging Puerto Rican playwrights include Aravind Enrique Adyanthaya, founder of Casa Cruz de la Luna in San Germán, Puerto Rico. Also notable in this category is playwright and screenwriter José Rivera, the first Puerto Rican screenwriter to be nominated for an Academy Award.

Stateside playwrights of Puerto Rican ancestry include Lin-Manuel Miranda, who won a Pulitzer Prize and Grammy Awards for the Broadway musical Hamilton. Miranda, whose parents are Puerto Rican, co-created In the Heights with Quiara Alegría Hudes, whose mother is Puerto Rican.

== Journalists ==
A variety of journalists and columnists further enrich Puerto Rican letters.

Nelson Antonio Denis published more than 300 editorials in El Diario La Prensa about the New York/Puerto Rican diaspora, which were recognized with repeated "Best Editorial Writing" awards from the National Association of Hispanic Journalists. Denis's history book War Against All Puerto Ricans, about the evolution of US-Puerto Rico relations since 1898, was the best-selling book in Puerto Rico in 2015 and 2016.

José Luis González (1926-1996) whose work País de cuatro pisos y otros ensayos describes the rigid structures of island society.

David Gonzalez is a journalist at the New York Times. Over a 25-year career, Gonzalez has written hundreds of stories in the New York Times which deal with the history, culture, politics and people of Puerto Rico. In 2013, the National Association of Hispanic Journalists inducted Gonzalez into its Hall of Fame, in recognition of his lifetime of committed and compassionate journalism.

Gerson Borrero is a journalist, radio host, and TV commentator in New York City. He has been editor-at-large of City & State NY and editor-in-chief of El Diario/La Prensa, the largest Spanish-language newspaper in New York City. His press coverage has ranged from New York City politics, cultural reviews and personality profiles, to the Somos Uno Conference and the Puerto Rican Day Parade.

== Historians ==
Historians such as Dr. Delma S. Arrigoitia have written books and documented the contributions that Puerto Rican women have made to society. Arrigoitia was the first person in the University of Puerto Rico to earn a master's degree in the field of history. Her publications, which cover Puerto Rico's early-20th-century politicians, include: Jose De Diego el legislador, San Juan, Eduardo Giorgetti Y Su Mundo: La Aparente Paradoja De Un Millonario Genio Empresarial Y Su Noble Humanismo;, Puerto Rico Por Encima de Todo: Vida y Obra de Antonio R. Barcelo, 1868-1938; and Introduccion a la Historia de la Moda en Puerto Rico.

Teresita A. Levy's Puerto Ricans in the Empire: The History of Tobacco Cultivation in Puerto Rico, 1898-1940, a study of the tobacco-growing regions in the eastern and western highlands of Puerto Rico, is the first book to tell how Puerto Ricans challenged United States officials and fought successfully for legislation that benefited the island. Her book has been praised by scholars. Puerto Ricans in the Empire provides an excellent introduction to Puerto Rico's crucial tobacco industry, with fascinating material on farmer organizations and agricultural research." —Herbert S. Klein, Gouverneur Morris Professor Emeritus of History Columbia University

== Modern and contemporary Puerto Rican literature ==
After a nationalist tradition of Puerto Rican writers from the 1930s, 1940s, and 1950s, authors are catalogued by decade into "generations." Some highly representative writers from the early and mid-20th century were: Juan Antonio Corretjer, Luis Lloréns Torres, Palés Matos, Enrique Laguerre, and Francisco Matos Paoli. These Puerto Rican writers wrote in Spanish and reflected a literary Latin American tradition, and offered a variety of universal and social themes. Major writers who got their start in the 1950s include José Luis González, René Marqués, Pedro Juan Soto, and Emilio Díaz Valcárcel.

Authors whose careers began in the 1960s and 1970s include Jack Agüeros, Angelamaría Dávila, Lourdes Vázquez, Rosario Ferré, Luis Rafael Sánchez, Manuel Ramos Otero, Olga Nolla, Edgardo Rodríguez Juliá, Myrna Casas, and Luis López Nieves. Major writers of the 1980s and 1990s include Ana Lydia Vega, Giannina Braschi, Martín Espada, Mayra Santos-Febres, Luz María Umpierre, and Eduardo Lalo.

Breakthrough voices of a new Puerto Rican literature began to emerge at the turn of the new century with the publication of Pedro Cabiya's Historias tremendas in 1999. Identity politics and the complexities of Puerto Rico's relationship with the U.S. — topics that had dominated the work of previous writers — gave way to the exploration of new genres and themes, such as Latinx speculative fiction, horror, fantasy, and noir, as seen in the short stories, novels, and comics by Pedro Cabiya, the experimentation by Bruno Soreno, and the short stories by José Liboy and Luis Negrón (whose Mundo Cruel won a Lambda Literary Award for Gay Fiction, 2014).

Emerging voices on the island include David Caleb Acevedo (Eiric R. Durandal Stormcrow), Rafael Acevedo, Moisés Agosto, Yolanda Arroyo Pizarro, Janette Becerra, Ricardo A. Domínguez, Ana María Fuster Lavín, Zoé Jiménez Corretjer, Juan López Bauzá, Alberto Martínez Márquez, Luis Negrón, Maribel Ortiz, Max Resto, and José E. Santos. Lawrence La Fountain-Stokes, Ángel Lozada, Benito Pastoriza Iyodo, Alfredo Villanueva Collado write and publish their works in Spanish on the mainland USA. Puerto Rican authors who write in English include Erika Lopez, Ivelisse Rodriguez, Lilliam Rivera, Quiara Alegría Hudes, Jaquira Díaz, Richie Narvaez, and Ernesto Quiñonez.

== Anthologies ==
Anthologies that focus on Puerto Rican writers include:

- Aftershocks of Disaster: Puerto Rico Before and After the Storm, edited by Yarimar Bonilla and Marisol LeBrón (Haymarket Books, 2019)
- Boricua en la Luna, edited by Elena M. Aponte
- Boricuas: Influential Puerto Rican Writings, edited by Roberto Santiago (Ballantine Books, 1995)
- Borinquen: An Anthology of Puerto Rican Literature, edited by Maria Teresa Babin and Stan Steiner (Knopf, 1974)
- Breaking Ground/Abriendo Caminos: Anthology of Puerto Rican Women Writers in New York, 1980-2012, edited by Myrna Nieves
- Growing Up Puerto Rican, edited by Joy L. De Jesús (William Morrow and Company, 1997)
- Literatura y narrativa puertorriqueña: La escritura entre siglos, edited by Mario Cancel
- Literatura puertorriqueña del siglo XX: Antología, edited by Mercedes López Baralt
- Los otros cuerpos: Antología de temática gay, lésbica y queer desde Puerto Rico y su diáspora, edited by David Caleb Acevedo, Moisés Agosto, and Luis Negrón, which focuses on LGBT themes
- Nuestro New York: An Anthology of Puerto Rican Plays, edited by John V. Antush (SIgnet, 1994)
- ¡Pa'que Tu Lo Sepas! edited by Angel Luis Colón
- Puerto Rico en Mi Corazón, edited by Raquel Salas Rivera, Ricardo Maldonado, Carina del Valle Schorske (Anomalous Press, 2019)
- Puerto Rican Poetry: A Selection from Aboriginal to Contemporary Times, edited by Robert Márquez
- Puerto Rican Writers at Home in the U.S.A., edited by Faythe Turner (Open Hand, 1991)
- San Juan Noir, edited by Mayra Santos-Febres (Akashic Noir, 2016

== See also ==
- American literature in Spanish
- Cultural diversity in Puerto Rico
- Latin American literature
- List of Puerto Rican writers
- History of women in Puerto Rico
- Nuyorican Movement
- Nuyorican Poets Café
- Media in Puerto Rico
