= Distancias (album) =

Studio album by Roy Brown
- Released: 1977
- Recorded: April to June 1976
- Genre: Nova trova, Puerto Rican folk music
- Label: Disco Libre

Roy Brown chronology
La Profecía de Urayoán (1976)	Distancias (1977)	Aires Bucaneros (1979)

Distancias is the fifth album from Puerto Rican folk singer Roy Brown. The album was released by Disco Libre in 1977. It is composed of songs based on poems from Juan Antonio Corretjer.

== Recording ==
Distancias was recorded at Tony Croatto's home studio in Caimito, San Juan from April to June 1976. The album consists of seven songs, all of them based on poems from Juan Antonio Corretjer, including a second version of "En la vida todo es ir". The album also features contributions from José González and Miguel Cubano.

== Track listing ==
All tracks are written by Juan Antonio Corretjer and Roy Brown, except where noted.

No.	Title	Writer(s)	Length
1.	"Oubao Moin"
2.	"Inriri cahuvial"	Juan Antonio Corretjer, José González
3.	"El hijo"	Juan Antonio Corretjer, José González
4.	"Andando de noche sola"	Juan Antonio Corretjer, Miguel Cubano
5.	"Día antes"	Juan Antonio Corretjer, Miguel Cubano
6.	"En la vida todo es ir"
7.	"Distancias"

== Cultural impact ==
Roy Brown's adaptations of Corretjer poems have become very popular in Puerto Rico. Some of the songs have been covered by other artists. "En la vida todo es ir" was recorded by Spanish singer Joan Manuel Serrat, and "Oubao Moin" was covered by Puerto Rican rock group Sol D'Menta on their eponymous debut album.
