= Distancias en Vivo =

Live album by Roy Brown
- Released: 1990
- Genre: Nova trova, Puerto Rican folk music
- Label: Lara-Yarí

Roy Brown chronology
Balada de Otro Tiempo (1989)	Distancias en Vivo (1990)	Nocturno (1991)

Distancias en Vivo is a live album from Puerto Rican singer Roy Brown. The album was released under Brown's label Discos Lara-Yarí in 1990.

== Background and recording ==
Distancias en Vivo is the first live album released by Roy Brown. Like the Distancias album, released in 1977, most of the songs featured in this live album are based on Juan Antonio Corretjer's poems, including the title song.

== Track listing ==
All tracks are written by Juan Antonio Corretjer and Roy Brown, except where noted.

No.	Title	Writer(s)	Length
1.	"Ayuburí"
2.	"Serenata"
3.	"Diana de Guilarte"
4.	"Seattle"	Roy Brown
5.	"Jinete de Junio"	Roy Brown
6.	"Boricua en la luna"
7.	"Distancias"
8.	"Oubao Moin"
9.	"Sal a caminar"	Roy Brown
