= La Profecía de Urayoán =

Studio album by Roy Brown
- Released: 1976
- Recorded: September 1975
- Genres: Nova trova, Puerto Rican folk music
- Label: Disco Libre

Roy Brown chronology
| Roy Brown III (1973) | La Profecía de Urayoán (1976) | Distancias (1977) |

La Profecía de Urayoán is the fourth album from Puerto Rican folk singer Roy Brown. The album was released by Disco Libre in 1976. It is the second album to feature collaborations between Brown and Cuban singer/songwriter Silvio Rodríguez.

== Recording ==
The long-playing album La Profética de Urayoán was recorded in the studios of the EGREM in Havana in September 1975 and published on vinyl under the label Free Disk. Disco Libre was a label organized by the members of the group Taoné, with the Puerto Rican Socialist Party, which published the first albums that popularized the singers Roy Brown, Antonio Cabán Vale, Andrés Jiménez, Pepe and Flora and Noel Hernández. Later, in 1979, Urayoán Prophecy was published in Spain under the Guimbarda label. This present publication, in digital format, is a restoration and remastering made by David Rodríguez (DRS) in 2020, for Discos LaraYarí.

== Track listing ==
All tracks are written by Roy Brown, except where noted.

| No. | Title | Writer(s) | Length |
|---|---|---|---|
| 1. | "Profecía de Urayoán" |
| 2. | "Compañera del silencio" |
| 3. | "El pozo" | María de los Milagros Pérez, Roy Brown |
| 4. | "Mamá Yoyó y las peripecias de don Trampolín" |
| 5. | "Al final de este viaje en la vida" | Silvio Rodríguez |
| 6. | "En la vida todo es ir" | Juan Antonio Corretjer, Roy Brown |
| 7. | "Te doy una canción" | Silvio Rodríguez |
| 8. | "Canción a Pedro" |
| 9. | "Una mujer y un hombre" | Juan Gelman, Roy Brown |

== Personnel ==
=== Musicians ===
- Miguel Cubano - guitars and cuatro
- José González - drums and guitars
- Harry Torres - bass
- Toni Fornaris - percussion
- Emiliano Salvador - piano on Tracks 2 and 4
- Manuel Valera - soprano sax on Track 1
- Kermit Llaurador - Flauta

=== Recording and production ===
- Pedro Téllez - recording
- German Pinelli - production
