= Roy Brown III =

Studio album by Roy Brown
- Released: 1973
- Genre: Nova trova, Puerto Rican folk music
- Label: Disco Libre

Roy Brown chronology
| Basta Ya... Revolución (1971) | Roy Brown III (1973) | La Profecía de Urayoán (1976) |

Roy Brown III is the third album from Puerto Rican folk singer Roy Brown. The album was released by Disco Libre in 1973. It also features the first collaboration between Brown and Cuban singer/songwriter Silvio Rodríguez.

== Background ==
Roy Brown III is notable for being the first album to feature collaborations between Brown and Cuban singer/songwriter Silvio Rodríguez. The album features Rodríguez' songs "Canción del elegido" and "Oda a mi generación". The former was already featured in the album 26 de julio: Los Nuevos Héroes, which features songs by Rodríguez, Pablo Milanés, and Noel Nicola. Brown and Rodríguez would continue collaborating through their careers several times.

The album also features the song "Al frente", which is inspired by a poem of Puerto Rican nationalist Hugo Margenat. Roy Brown III also features singing contributions by Antonio Cabán Vale "El Topo", Andrés Jiménez, and Rodolfo Gandía, among others.

== Track listing ==
All tracks are written by Roy Brown, except where noted.

| No. | Title | Writer(s) | Length |
|---|---|---|---|
| 1. | "Canción de paz" |
| 2. | "Somos" |
| 3. | "Canción sin nombre" |
| 4. | "Hablar de amor" |
| 5. | "Oda a mi generación" | Silvio Rodríguez |
| 6. | "Canción a Pedro" |
| 7. | "Canción del elegido" | Silvio Rodríguez |
| 8. | "Canción a los pioneros" |
| 9. | "Al frente" | Hugo Margenat, Roy Brown |
| 10. | "Hablando" |

== Personnel ==
=== Musicians ===
- Antonio Cabán Vale - co-lead vocals on "Oda a una generación"
- Henry Vázquez - guitars and quinto
- Rucco Gandía - bass
- Roy Brown - guitars

=== Recording and production ===
- Pedrito Enríquez - engineer
