= Francisco Ayerra de Santa María =

Puerto Rican poet

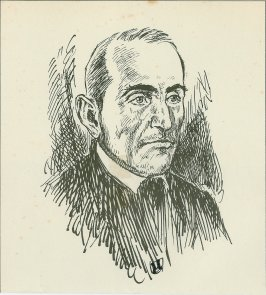
- Puerto Rico's first native born poet
- Born: 1630; San Juan, Puerto Rico
- Died: 1708 (aged 77–78); Mexico
- Occupation: priest

Father Francisco Ayerra de Santa María (1630–1708) is considered to be Puerto Rico's first native born poet.

== Early years ==
Santa Maria was born in San Juan, Puerto Rico, where he received his primary and secondary education. He went to Mexico as a young and enrolled in the University of Mexico, where he earned a degree in Canonic Law. Following this, he was ordained as priest.

It was in Mexico that Santa Maria wrote most of his works and became successful as a poet. His Poetic style was known as "cultural", because it was based on religious and historical themes. He wrote his verses in both Spanish and Latin. His work has been included in many anthologies.

== First rector of the Tridentino Seminary in Mexico ==
In 1690, Carlos de Sigüenza, a Mexican Intellectual, became fascinated with the adventures of Puerto Rican named Alonzo Ramirez, who as a child embarked from San Juan, Puerto Rico on an adventurous voyage in 1675, that would take him around the world and eventually to his final destination Yucatan, Mexico. Sigüenza wrote the book titled "Infortunios de Alonso Ramírez" (The Misfortunes of Alonso Ramirez) where he narrated these adventures. Archival evidence recently discovered by Fabio López-Lázaro proves not only the existence of Ramírez but also the historical accuracy of his experiences with pirates, most noticeably William Dampier, as narrated by Sigüenza. Santa Maria held the position of Censor from the Holy Office in Mexico when he was approached by Sigüenza. During this period of time, the church would normally censor that type of work, however Santa Maria who like Ramirez was also a native of San Juan, Puerto Rico, overlooked his obligations and cleared it for publication. It is believed that Alonso Ramirez is the first Puerto Rican to have traveled around the world. Eventually, Santa Maria became the first rector of the Tridentino Seminary in Mexico. Father Francisco Ayerra de Santa Maria died in Mexico in 1708.

== See also ==
- List of Puerto Rican writers
- List of Puerto Ricans
- Puerto Rican literature
