= Río Piedras massacre =

Police shooting of supporters of the Puerto Rican Nationalist Party

1935 Río Piedras massacre
- Location: 18°23′59″N 66°03′00″W; Río Piedras, Puerto Rico
- Date: October 24, 1935
- Target: Supporters of the Puerto Rican Nationalist Party
- Attack type: Massacre, mass shooting
- Deaths: 5 (4 were members of the Puerto Rican Nationalist Party)
- Perpetrator: Puerto Rico Police: Chief Elisha Francis Riggs

The Río Piedras massacre occurred on October 24, 1935, at the University of Puerto Rico in Río Piedras. Puerto Rico Police officers confronted and opened fire on supporters of the Puerto Rican Nationalist Party. Four Nationalist Party members were killed, and one police officer was wounded during the shooting.

== Prelude to the massacre ==
In 1931, the U.S.-appointed Governor of Puerto Rico, Theodore Roosevelt Jr., named Dr. Carlos E. Chardón as Chancellor of the University of Puerto Rico. He was the first Puerto Rican to have this position. In 1935, Chardón initiated a project based on the ideas of Luis Muñoz Marín, who at the time was a Senator in the Puerto Rican legislature and a member of the Liberal Party of Puerto Rico. It was known as the Reconstruction of Puerto Rico Project. The plan, which was within the New Deal criteria established by U.S. President Franklin Delano Roosevelt during the Great Depression, was well received and became known as Plan Chardón.

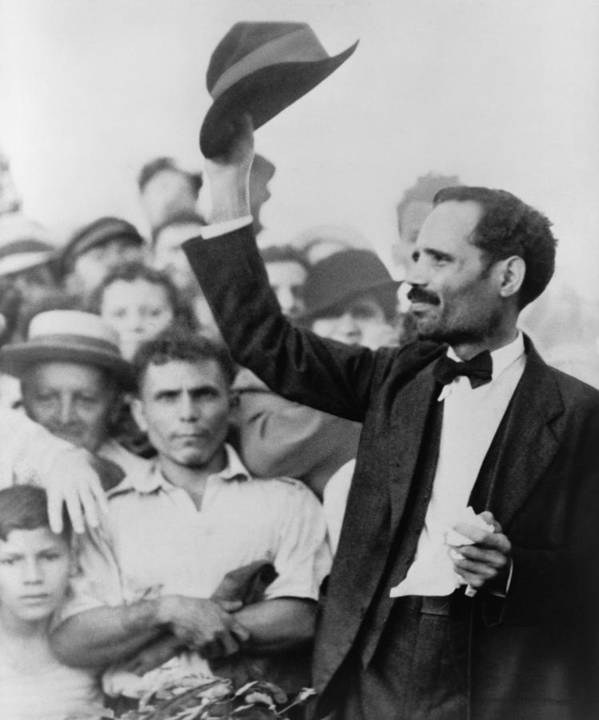
Don Pedro Albizu Campos, 1936

Pedro Albizu Campos, president of the Puerto Rican Nationalist Party, knew that Roosevelt had been implicated as Assistant Secretary of the Navy in helping Secretary Albert Fall of the Department of Interior to arrange for private leasing of Navy oil fields, in what became known as the Teapot Dome Scandal of the 1920s. Albizu Campos worried that Plan Chardón would strip Puerto Rico of her natural resources. He believed that Chardón had been placed in charge of the Puerto Rico Reconstruction Administration (PRRA) to "Americanize" the university with the support of the Liberal Party. On October 20, 1935, in a political meeting which the Nationalist Party held in the town of Maunabo and which was transmitted by radio, Albizu Campos denounced Chardón, the university deans and the Liberal Party as traitors, saying they wanted to convert the university into an "American" propaganda institution.

On October 23, 1935, a group of students at the university who supported Chardón began to collect signatures for a petition to declare Albizu Campos "Student Enemy Number One." In turn, a protest against the group by the pro-Nationalist faction of students denounced Chardón and the Liberal Party as agents of the United States.

== Massacre ==
On October 24, 1935, a student assembly held at the university declared Albizu Campos as persona non grata. Chardón requested that the governor provide armed Puerto Rico Police officers on the university grounds if the situation turned violent. Two police officers spotted a "suspicious-looking vehicle" and asked the driver, Ramón S. Pagán, and his friend Pedro Quiñones, for identification. A struggle ensued, and the police killed Pagán and Quiñones. The local newspaper, El Mundo, reported on October 25 that the day before, observers heard an explosion followed by gunfire; Eduardo Rodríguez Vega and José Santiago Barea were also killed that day.

An eyewitness, Isolina Rondón, testified that she saw the police officers shooting at the victims and heard one police officer screaming, "not to let them escape alive." Her testimony was ignored, and no charges were filed against the police officers. The Río Piedras massacre left four men dead.

== Casualties ==
The supporters of the Nationalist Party killed during the shooting were:

- Ramón S. Pagán – Nationalist Party Treasurer
- Eduardo Rodríguez Vega
- José Santiago Barea
- Pedro Quiñones

A bystander (not a Nationalist) who was also killed:

- Juan Muñoz Jiménez

Among the wounded were:

- Dionisio Pearson, a nationalist youth who was later charged with murder, because he participated in the Río Piedras riots.
- One police officer.

== Aftermath ==
At the time of the massacre, the top-ranking U.S.-appointed police chief on the island was a former U.S. Army Colonel named Elisha Francis Riggs. Colonel Elisha Francis Riggs was born in Georgetown in northwest Washington, D.C., and was appointed Chief of Police of Puerto Rico in 1933, by Blanton Winship, the U.S. appointed governor of Puerto Rico. He was an unpopular police chief, stemming from his decisions to repress the growing organized labor movement among sugar cane workers and the Nationalist Pro-Independence Movement. Since the entire Puerto Rico Police took their orders from Colonel Riggs, the Nationalist Party considered him responsible for the massacre.

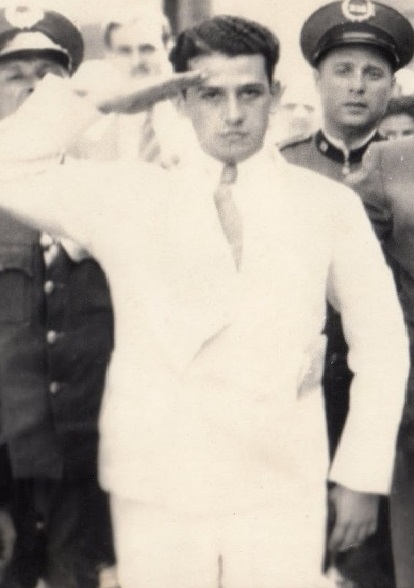
Elías Beauchamp gives a Cadets of the Republic military salute, moments before being shot, officially while attempting to escape, at Puerto Rico Police headquarters in San Juan.

On February 23, 1936, Colonel Riggs was assassinated by the Nationalists Hiram Rosado and Elías Beauchamp, both members of the Cadets of the Republic, the paramilitary wing of the Nationalist Party. They attacked and fatally shot the police chief as he was returning home after attending Mass at San Juan's Cathedral. Rosado and Beauchamp were arrested and were either subjected to summary execution or shot while attempting to escape at Puerto Rico Police headquarters in San Juan. Before his death, Beauchamp posed, giving a military salute for a news photographer.

News of the assassination spread throughout the United States. The Puerto Rican Senator, Luis Muñoz Marín, who was in Washington, D.C., at the time, was asked by Ernest Gruening, the administrator of the Puerto Rico Reconstruction Administration (1935–1937), to publicly condemn Col. Riggs's assassination. Senator Muñoz Marín declined unless he was also allowed to condemn the Puerto Rico Police for allegedly executing the two assassins without trial.

Gruening joined US Senator Millard Tydings from Maryland, a Democrat, in a 1943 legislative proposal to grant independence to Puerto Rico. Although the measure was welcomed by every political party in Puerto Rico, including Muñoz's Liberal Party, the senator opposed the measure. Senator Muñoz Marín said that independence would hurt Puerto Rico's economy. He contrasted the proposed bill with the provisions of the Tydings–McDuffie Act, which provided independence for the Philippines after a 10-year transition period. Due to his opposition, the bill did not progress in Congress, and Puerto Rico did not receive its political independence from the United States.

In 1950, the 81st United States Congress passed legislation to enable the people of Puerto Rico to organize a local government pursuant to a constitution of their own, comparable to those of other territories and states of the United States. From its enactment until this day, the act has served as the organic law for the government of Puerto Rico and its relation with the United States. Muñoz Marín, as Governor of Puerto Rico, supported the measure. Muñoz Marín became the first native-born elected governor of Puerto Rico.

After Col. Riggs's assassination, many Nationalist Party leaders were imprisoned. Members of the Puerto Rican independence movement came under greater scrutiny and prosecution. Among the leaders arrested were Pedro Albizu Campos, Juan Antonio Corretjer, Luis F. Velazquez, Clemente Soto Vélez, Erasmo Velazquez, Julio H. Velazquez, Juan Gallardo Santiago, Juan Juarbe Juarbe, and Pablo Rosado Ortiz. They were later released on $10,000 bail. The Nationalist Rafael Ortiz Pacheco fled to the Dominican Republic.

These leaders were charged with having "conspired to overthrow" the U.S. government on the island. They were tried in the U.S. District Court in Old San Juan, Puerto Rico. The first trial jury, which included a minority of Puerto Ricans among its members, ended in a hung jury. A second jury was picked, consisting solely of "Anglo-Americans." This jury found every Nationalist charged "guilty" except Juarbe Juarbe. The guilty findings and sentences were appealed before the U.S. Court of Appeals for the First Circuit in Boston, MA, which affirmed the lower court's determinations.

== See also ==
- List of Puerto Ricans
- List of revolutions and rebellions
- Truman assassination attempt
- Puerto Rican Nationalist Party
- Ponce massacre
- Puerto Rican Nationalist Party Revolts of the 1950s
- Puerto Rican Independence Party
- Intentona de Yauco
