= Afrocuba =

Cuba-based Afro-Cuban jazz group

Afrocuba is a Cuba-based Afro-Cuban jazz septet started in 1978 and led by bandleader and trumpeter Roberto Garcia López, along with saxophonist David Suarez Merlin and others from the Havana Conservatoire of Music. They rarely have performed outside of Cuba, though they have performed at Ronnie Scott's Jazz Club in London.

== Discography ==
- Acontecer (1992, Discmedi Blau)
- Eclecticism (1994, Jazz House)
