= Nationalist Party of Puerto Rico =

Puerto Rican political party

Nationalist Party of Puerto Rico Partido Nacionalista de Puerto Rico
- President: Vacant
- Founded: September 17, 1922
- Dissolved: 1965
- Headquarters: San Juan, Puerto Rico
- Paramilitary wing: Cadets of the Republic
- Women's wing: Daughters of Freedom
- Ideology: Puerto Rican independence; Nationalism; Anti-imperialism; Panhispanism
- Regional affiliation: Foro de São Paulo
- Colors: Black, white

Party flag
- Politics of Puerto Rico; Political parties; Elections; Notable past presidents *José Coll y Cuchí; *Dr. Pedro Albizu Campos

The Nationalist Party of Puerto Rico (Spanish: Partido Nacionalista de Puerto Rico, PNPR) was a Puerto Rican political party founded on September 17, 1922, in San Juan, Puerto Rico. Its primary goal was to work for Puerto Rico's independence. The Party's selection in 1930 of Pedro Albizu Campos as its president brought a radical change to the organization and its tactics.

In the 1930s, intimidation, repression and persecution of Party members by the government, then headed by a U.S. president-appointed governor, led to the assassination of two government officials, the attempted assassination of a federal judge in Puerto Rico, and the Rio Piedras and Ponce massacres. Under the leadership of Albizu Campos, the party abandoned the electoral process in favor of direct armed conflict as means to gain independence from the United States.

By the late 1940s, a more US-friendly party, the Partido Popular Democrático (PPD), had gained an overwhelming number of seats in the legislature and, in 1948, it passed Ley de la Mordaza (Gag Law), which attempted to suppress the Nationalist Party and similar opposition. The Puerto Rican police arrested many Nationalist Party members under this law, some of whom were sentenced to lengthy prison terms. With a new political status pending for Puerto Rico as a Commonwealth, Albizu Campos ordered armed uprisings in several Puerto Rican towns to occur on October 30, 1950. In a related effort, two Nationalists also attempted to assassinate US President Harry S. Truman on November 1, 1950, in an effort to call international attention to issues related to Puerto Rico's political status, but the attempt failed. The last major armed event by the Nationalists occurred in 1954 at the US House of Representatives when four party members shot and wounded five Congressmen.

After Albizu Campos's death in 1965, the party dissolved into factions and members joined other parties, but some continue to follow the party's ideals in one form or another, often informally or ad hoc, to this day.

== Historical context ==
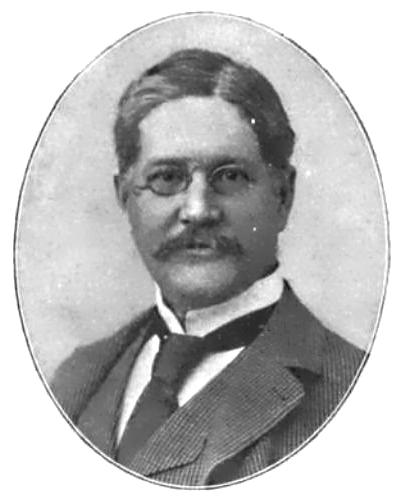
The first American governor of Puerto Rico resigned to become Puerto Rico's first sugar baron

After four hundred years of colonial domination under the Spanish Empire, Puerto Rico received sovereignty in 1898 through a Carta de Autonomía (Charter of Autonomy). This Charter of Autonomy was signed by Spanish Prime Minister Práxedes Mateo Sagasta and ratified by the Spanish Cortes. Despite this, just a few months later, the United States claimed ownership of the island as part of the Treaty of Paris which concluded the Spanish–American War.

Opponents to the colonial government argued that the profits generated by this arrangement were one-sided, enormous for the United States. [google.com]

When the war ended, U.S. President McKinley appointed Charles Herbert Allen as the first civilian governor of Puerto Rico. Though Allen had a business background, his financial administration of Puerto Rico was strikingly unsound. He ignored the appropriation requests of the Puerto Rican House of Delegates, refused to make any municipal, agricultural or small business loans, built roads at double the costs of preceding administrations, and left 85% of the school-age population without schools. Rather than making these requested infrastructure and education investments, Allen's budget raided the Puerto Rican treasury. His administration re-directed tax revenues to no-bid contracts for U.S. businessmen, railroad subsidies for U.S.-owned sugar plantations, and high salaries for U.S. bureaucrats in the island government.

Allen's financial acumen improved considerably when he returned to the U.S., and resumed his own personal business interests. In 1901, Allen resigned as governor and installed himself as president of the largest sugar-refining company in the world, the American Sugar Refining Company. This company was later renamed as the Domino Sugar company. In effect, Charles Allen leveraged his governorship of Puerto Rico into a controlling interest over the entire Puerto Rican economy.

In 1914, the Puerto Rican House of Delegates voted unanimously for independence from the United States. In 1917, the US Congress passed an act by which it granted citizenship to Puerto Rican residents. This was overwhelmingly opposed by the island's political leaders. Critics said the US was simply interested in increasing the size of its conscription pool to get soldiers for World War I.

== United States "Manifest Destiny" ==
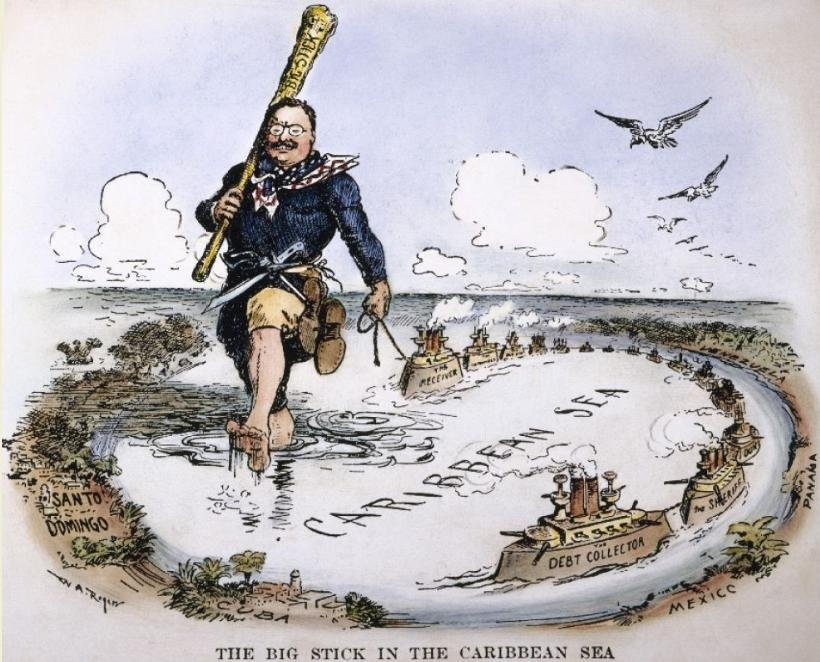
Pres. Roosevelt wielding his big stick in the Caribbean

By 1930, over 40 percent of all the arable land in Puerto Rico had been converted into sugar plantations, which were entirely owned by Domino Sugar Company and U.S. banking interests. These bank syndicates also owned the entire coastal railroad, and the San Juan international seaport.

This was not limited to Puerto Rico. By 1930 the United Fruit Company owned over one million acres of land in Guatemala, Honduras, Colombia, Panama, Nicaragua, Costa Rica, Mexico and Cuba. By 1940, in Honduras alone, the United Fruit Company owned 50 percent of all private land in the entire country. In Guatemala, the United Fruit Company owned 75 percent of all private land by 1942 – plus most of Guatemala's roads, power stations and phone lines, the only Pacific seaport, and every mile of railroad.

The U.S. government supported all these economic exploits, and provided military "persuasion" whenever necessary.

== Founding of the Nationalist Party ==
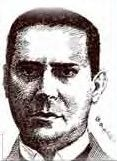
Jose Coll y Cuchi

The origins of the Puerto Rican Nationalist Party date to 1917, when a group of Union Party members in Ponce, dissatisfied with the attitude of the Union Party of Puerto Rico towards the "granting" of U.S. citizenship, formed the "Asociación Nacionalista de Ponce" (Ponce Nationalist Association). Among its founders were Guillermo Salazar, Rafael Matos Bernier, J. A. González, and Julio César Fernández. These men also founded the newspaper El Nacionalista.

The Puerto Rican Nationalist Party was formed as a direct response to the American colonial government. In 1919, José Coll y Cuchí, a member of the Union Party of Puerto Rico, felt that the Union Party was not doing enough for the cause of Puerto Rican independence. Coll y Cuchí and some followers left to form the Nationalist Association of Puerto Rico in San Juan. Under Coll y Cuchí's presidency, the party convinced the Puerto Rican Legislative Assembly to approve an Act that would permit the transfer of the remains of the Puerto Rican patriot, Ramón Emeterio Betances, from Paris, France, to Puerto Rico.

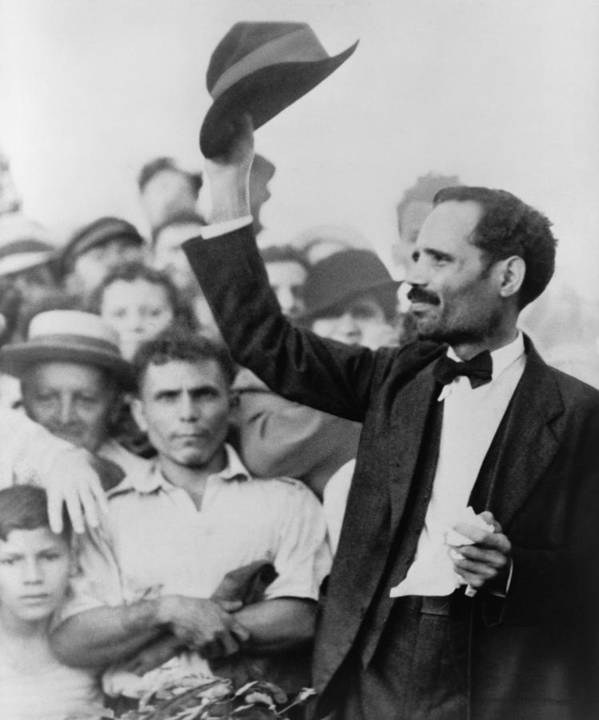
Don Pedro Albizu Campos

The Legislative Assembly appointed Alfonso Lastra Charriez as its emissary since he had French heritage and spoke the language fluently. Betances' remains arrived in San Juan on August 5, 1920. A funeral caravan organized by the Nationalist Association transferred the remains from San Juan to the town of Cabo Rojo, where his ashes were interred by his monument.

By the 1920s, two other pro-independence organizations had formed on the Island: the Nationalist Youth and the Independence Association of Puerto Rico. The Independence Association was founded by José S. Alegría, Eugenio Font Suárez and Leopoldo Figueroa in 1920. On September 17, 1922, these three political organizations joined forces and formed the Puerto Rican Nationalist Party. Coll y Cuchi was elected president and José S. Alegría (father of Ricardo Alegría) vice-president.

In 1924, Pedro Albizu Campos joined the party and was named vice-president. Alegría was named Nationalist Party president in 1928 and held that position until 1930. By 1930, disagreements between Coll y Cuchi and Albizu Campos as to how the party should be run, led the former and his followers to leave and return to the Union Party. Albizu Campos did not like what he considered to be Coll y Cuchí's attitude of fraternal solidarity with the enemy. On May 11, 1930, Pedro Albizu Campos was elected president of the Puerto Rican Nationalist Party.

The Puerto Rican Nationalist Party maintained that, as a matter of international law, the Treaty of Paris following the Spanish–American War could not have empowered the Spanish to "give" to the US what was no longer theirs. Under Albizu Campos's leadership during the years of the Great Depression, the party became the largest independence movement in Puerto Rico.

In the mid-1930s, there were disappointing electoral results and strong repression by the territorial police authorities. The party staged some protests that developed into celebrated incidents because of police overreaction: The October 1935 Rio Piedras and the Ponce massacres. In these, government forces fired on unarmed civilians. After the Río Piedras massacre, in December 1935, Albizu Campos announced that the Nationalist Party would withdraw from electoral participation while the United States kept control. Albizu Campos began to advocate direct, violent revolution.

== Nationalist Party during 1930–1950 ==
Nationalist Party partisans were involved in a variety of dramatic and violent confrontations between 1930 and 1950:

- In the 1930s, the party founded the official youth organization Cadetes de la República, headed by Raimundo Díaz Pacheco, and the Hijas de la Libertad (Daughters of Freedom), the women's branch of the Cadetes and in which Julia de Burgos served as secretary general.
- On April 6, 1932, Nationalist partisans marched into the Capitol building in San Juan to protest a legislative proposal to establish the current Puerto Rican flag as the official flag of the insular government. Nationalists preferred the flag used during the Grito de Lares. A melée ensued in the building, and one partisan fell to his death from a second floor interior balcony. The protest was condemned by the legislators Rafael Martínez Nadal and Santiago Iglesias; and endorsed by others, including the future leader of the statehood party, Manuel García Méndez.

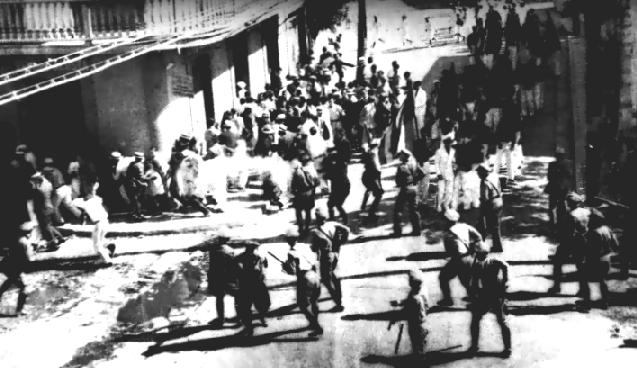
The Ponce massacre. Police open fire on unarmed marchers and bystanders on Palm Sunday. The 19 dead included a 7-year-old girl, who was shot in the back.

- On October 24, 1935, a confrontation with police at University of Puerto Rico campus in Río Piedras resulted in the deaths of 4 Nationalist partisans and one policeman. The event is known as the Río Piedras massacre. This and other events led the party to announce on December 12, 1935, a boycott of all elections held while Puerto Rico remained part of the United States.
- On February 23, 1936, in San Juan, two Nationalists assassinated the Insular Police Chief and ex-U.S. Marine officer, E. Francis Riggs. The Nationalist perpetrators, Hiram Rosado and Elías Beauchamp, were arrested, transported to police headquarters, and killed within hours without trial. No policeman was ever tried or indicted for their deaths.
- On March 21, 1937, the Nationalist Party organized a peaceful march in the southern city of Ponce. At the last moment, the permit was withdrawn, and the Insular Police (a force "somewhat resembling the National Guard of the typical U.S. state" and which answered to the U.S.-appointed governor Blanton Winship) were arrayed against the marchers. They opened fire upon what a U.S. Congressman and others reported were unarmed and defenseless Cadets and bystanders alike, killing 19 and badly wounding over 200 more.

Many of these unarmed people were shot in the back while trying to run away – including a 7-year old girl, who died as a result. An ACLU report declared it a massacre and it has since been known as the Ponce massacre. The march had been organized to commemorate the ending of slavery in Puerto Rico by the governing Spanish National Assembly in 1873, and to protest the incarceration by the U.S. government of nationalist leader Pedro Albizu Campos. Soon thereafter, the Puerto Rican government arrested the leadership of the Nationalist party, including Pedro Albizu Campos. In two trials, they were convicted of conspiracy to overthrow the government of the United States.

A government investigation into the incident drew few conclusions. A second, independent investigation ordered by the US Commission for Civil Rights (May 5, 1937) led by Arthur Garfield Hays (a member of the ACLU) with Fulgencio Piñero, Emilio Belaval, Jose Davila Rice, Antonio Ayuyo Valdivieso, Manuel Diaz Garcia, and Franscisco M. Zeno, concluded that the events on March 21constituted a massacre. The report harshly criticized the repressive tactics and massive civil rights violations by the administration of Governor Blanton Winship.

External videos
- and view a portion of the Albizu Documentary Trailer made in English here.
- You may watch newsreel scenes of the Ponce Massacre here

- On July 25, 1938, the municipality of Ponce organized celebrations to commemorate the American landing in 1898. This included a military parade and speeches by Governor Blanton Winship, Senate president Rafael Martínez Nadal, and others. When Winship rose to speak, shots were fired at him, slaying police Colonel Luis Irizarry, who was seated next to the governor. The Nationalist Interim President M. Medina Ramírez repudiated the shooting and denied any involvement in it, but numerous Nationalists were arrested and convicted of participating in the shooting. Winship worked to repress the Nationalists. Jaime Benitez, a student at the University of Chicago at the time, wrote a letter to President Franklin D. Roosevelt which in part read as follows:

The point I am to make is that the Governor [Winship] himself through his military approach to things has helped keep Puerto Rico in an unnecessary state of turmoil. He seems to think that the political problem of Puerto Rico limits itself to a fight between himself and the Nationalists, that no holds are barred in that fight and that everybody else should keep out. As a matter of fact he has played the Nationalist game and they have played his.

Soon afterward, two Nationalist partisans, among them Raimundo Díaz Pacheco, attempted to assassinate Robert Cooper, judge of the Federal Court in Puerto Rico. On May 12, 1939, Winship was summarily removed from his post as Governor by President Roosevelt.

- On May 21, 1948, a bill was introduced before the Puerto Rican Senate which would restrain the rights of the independence and Nationalist movements on the archipelago. The Senate, which at the time was controlled by the Partido Popular Democrático (PPD) and presided by Luis Muñoz Marín, approved the bill that day. This bill, which resembled the anti-communist Smith Act passed in the United States in 1940, became known as the Ley de la Mordaza (Gag Law) when the U.S.-appointed governor of Puerto Rico, Jesús T. Piñero, signed it into law on June 10, 1948.

Officially known as Law 53 (Ley 53) of 1948, the Gag Law made it illegal to display the Puerto Rican flag, sing patriotic songs, talk about independence, or fight for the liberation of the island, with anyone found guilty of disobeying the law being subject to a sentence of up to ten years imprisonment, a fine of US$10,000 (equivalent to $134,000 in 2025), or both.

- Albizu Campos ordered Nationalist uprisings to take place on October 30, 1950 (they had originally been planned for 1952, when Commonwealth status was expected.) These involved a dozen or so skirmishes throughout the island.

== Nationalist Revolts of 1950 ==
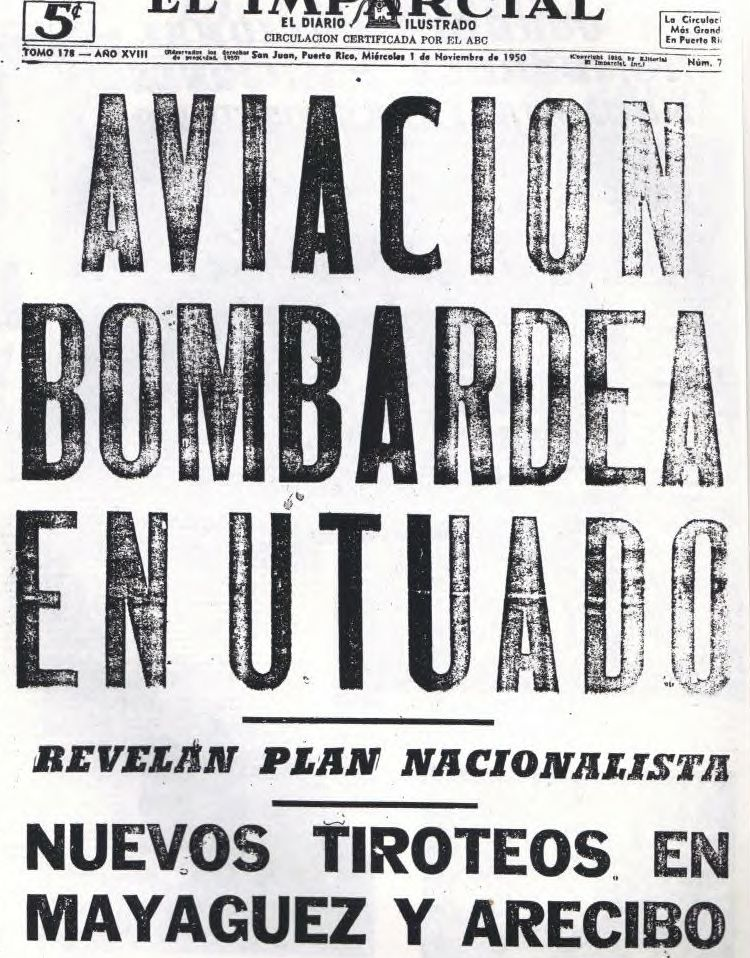
El Imparcial headline: "Aviation (US) bombs Utuado"

External audio
- You may listen to one of the speeches made in Spanish by Albizu Campos here

External videos
- Newsreel scenes in Spanish of the Puerto Rican Nationalist Party Revolts of the 1950s
- Newsreel scenes in English of the assassination attempt on U.S. President Harry S Truman
- Newsreel scenes in Spanish and in English of the attack on the U.S. Capitol led by Lolita Lebrón

The first battle of the Nationalist uprisings occurred in the early hours of October 29, in barrio Macaná of Peñuelas. The police surrounded the house of the mother of Melitón Muñiz, the president of the Peñuelas Nationalist Party, that he was using as a distribution center for weapons for the Nationalist Revolt. Without warning, the police fired on the Nationalists and a firefight ensued, resulting in the death of two Nationalists and wounding of six police officers.

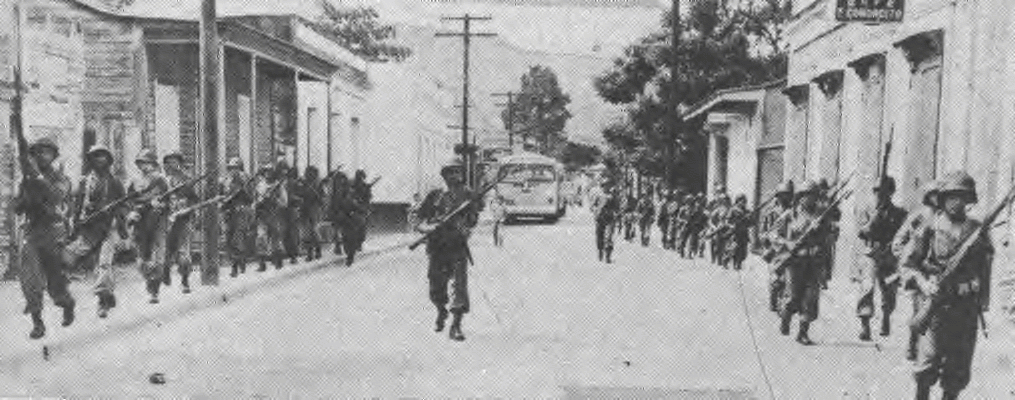
The 296th Regiment of the U.S. National Guard occupy Jayuya

In the Jayuya Uprising, led by Nationalist leader Blanca Canales, a police station and post office were burned. The town was held by the Nationalists for three days.

The Utuado Uprising culminated in the Utuado Massacre by the local police, in which five Nationalists were executed.

The San Juan Nationalist revolt was a Nationalist attempt to enter the Governor's mansion, La Fortaleza, in order to attack then-governor Luis Muñoz Marín. The hour-long shootout resulted in the death of four Nationalists: Domingo Hiraldo Resto, Carlos Hiraldo Resto, Manuel Torres Medina and Raimundo Díaz Pacheco. Three guards were also seriously wounded.

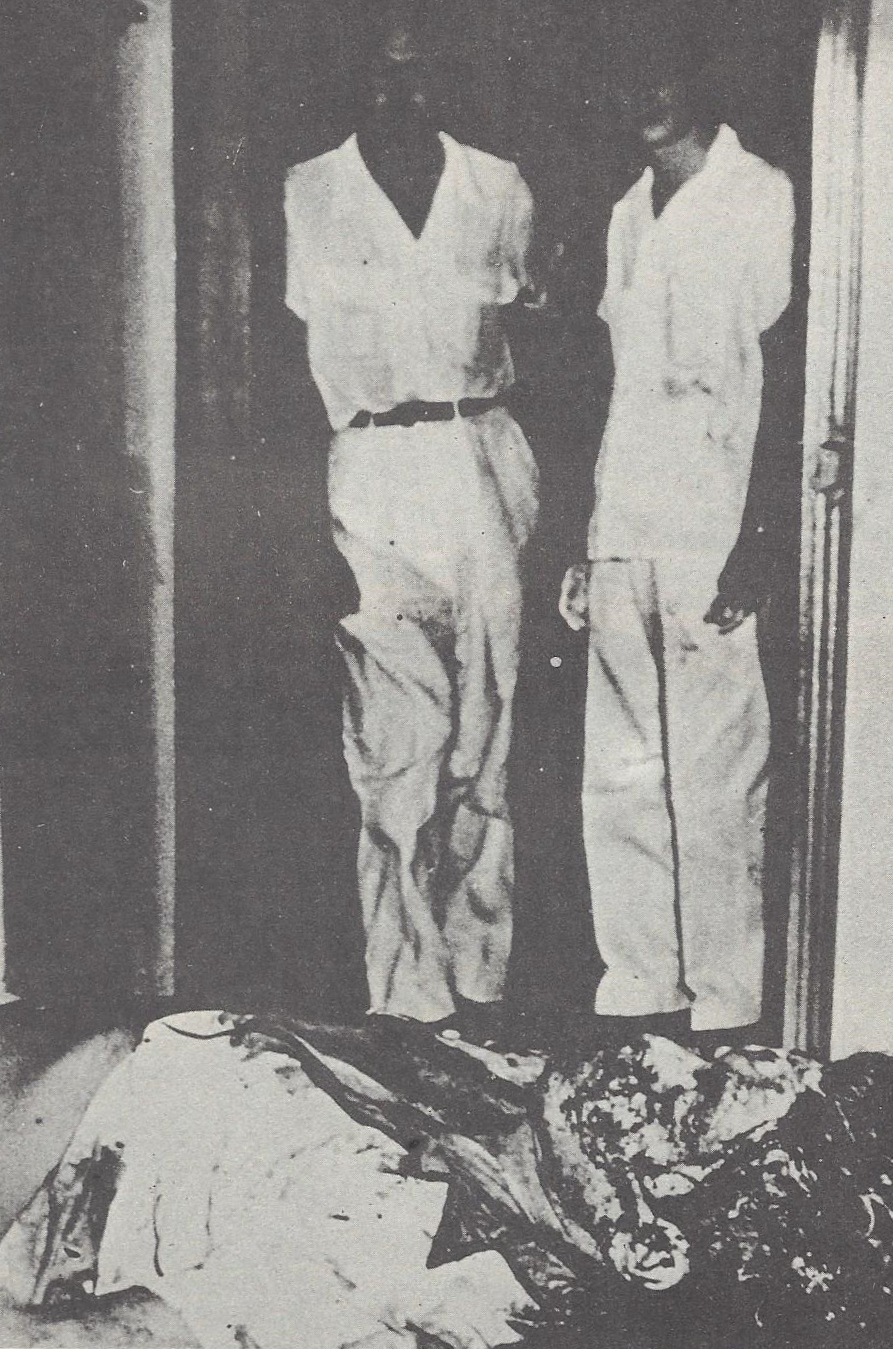
Hipólito Miranda Díaz, killed in the Arecibo incident

Various other shootouts took place throughout island – including those at Mayagüez, Naranjito, Arecibo, and Ponce, where Antonio Alicea, Jose Miguel Alicea, Francisco Campos (Albizu Campos's nephew), Osvaldo Perez Martinez and Ramon Pedrosa Rivera were arrested and accused of the murder of police corporal Aurelio Miranda during the revolt. Raul de Jesus was accused of violating the Insular Firearms Law.

On October 31, police officers and National Guardsmen surrounded Salón Boricua, a barbershop in Santurce. Believing that a group of Nationalists were inside the shop, they opened fire. The only person in the shop was Campos barber Vidal Santiago Díaz. Santiago Díaz, who fought alone against the attackers for three hours, received five wounds, including one in the head. The battle was transmitted "live" via the radio airwaves to the public in general.

On November 1, 1950, Griselio Torresola and Oscar Collazo unsuccessfully attempted to assassinate U.S. President Harry S. Truman, who was staying at the Blair House in Washington, D.C.

Truman supported development of a constitution for Puerto Rico and the 1952 status referendum on it; 82% of the voters approved the constitution. The US Congress also approved the constitution.

On March 1, 1954, Lolita Lebrón together with fellow Nationalists Rafael Cancel Miranda, Irvin Flores and Andrés Figueroa Cordero attacked the U.S. House of Representatives in Washington, D.C. The group opened fire with automatic pistols. Some 30 shots were fired (mostly by Cancel, according to his account), wounding five lawmakers. One of the congressmen, Representative Alvin Bentley from Michigan, was seriously wounded. On her arrest, Lebrón yelled "I did not come to kill anyone, I came to die for Puerto Rico!"

On November 18, 1955, a non-violent splinter group of nationalists calling themselves La Quinta Columna (The 5th Column) broke away from the Puerto Rican Nationalist Party due to not supporting the ideas and thoughts of Albizu Campos, as to a Puerto Rico relationship with Spain as its Mother country and their nationalistic love for Puerto Rico as their Motherland. The other reason for the splinter group was due to the violence that took place in the 1950s. This splinter group would later become known in 1968 as El Movimiento Indio Taino de Boriken (The Taino Indian Movement of Puerto Rico) which was primarily made up of the children of the Puerto Rican Nationalists whom would come to establish the indigenous grassroots civil rights movement in Puerto Rico.

== 1960s–present ==
Although less active, the Nationalist Party continues to exist as an organization and an ideology. It also has somewhat of a "chapter" in New York City. The New York Junta is an autonomous organ of the party that recognizes, and is recognized by, the National Junta in Puerto Rico.

In 2006 and in representation of the Puerto Rican Nationalist Party, Jose Castillo spoke before the United Nations Special Committee on Decolonization and said that the Nationalist Party "had appeared in the past to denounce colonialism in Puerto Rico and hoped the Special Committee would show its commitment to the island's struggle for self-determination, so that it could join the United Nations in its own right ... The Special Committee and its resolutions on Puerto Rico were indispensable instruments." Castillo "called upon the United States Government to assure the Puerto Rican people of their right to self-determination and human rights and immediately cease the persecution, arrests, and murders perpetrated against independence fighters. Vieques peace activists must be freed immediately, and the FBI's electronic surveillance and continued harassment of independence fighters must be stopped. The United States must also end its actions against basic human rights while fully implementing the United Nations resolution calling for a constituent assembly to begin decolonization." Castillo added that "Puerto Rico had its own national identity ... Since its 1898 invasion, the United States had tried to destroy the nationality of Puerto Rican people. It kept Puerto Rico in isolation, maintaining it as private corporation from which it earned billions a year ... exploitation had made foreigners richer and the Puerto Rican people poorer. The fact that Puerto Rico was the last territory in the world could not be hidden. Violation of rights there would cease only once it was a free and independent nation. The United States must provide compensation for what it had done to Puerto Rico's land and people."

In 2013 the Puerto Rico Nationalist Party made a public demonstration of their pro-Independence commitment by protesting a speech from the Governor of Puerto Rico, Alejandro García Padilla.

Its last president was Antonio "Toñito" Cruz Colón until his death in October 2014.

== Photo gallery ==
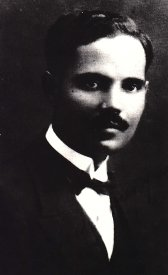
Pedro Albizu Campos

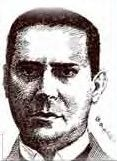
José Coll y Cuchí

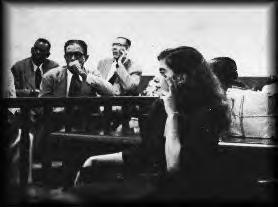
Olga Viscal Garriga

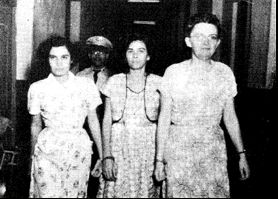
(Left to right) Nationalists Carmen María Pérez González, Olga Viscal Garriga and Ruth Mary Reynolds

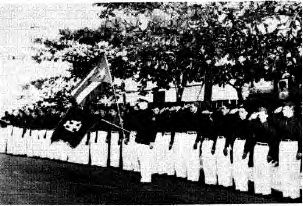
Raimundo Díaz Pacheco commanding the Nationalist Cadets

== See also ==
- Intentona de Yauco
- Puerto Rican Nationalist Party Revolts of the 1950s
- Puerto Rican Independence Party
- Truman assassination attempt

=== Notable members of the PNPR ===
- Casimiro Berenguer
- Rosa Collazo
- Juan Antonio Corretjer
- Carmelo Delgado Delgado
- Isabel Freire de Matos
- Hugo Margenat
- Francisco Matos Paoli
- Isolina Rondón
- Isabel Rosado
- Daniel Santos
- Clemente Soto Vélez
- Antonio Vélez Alvarado
- Carlos Vélez Rieckehoff
- Teófilo Villavicencio Marxuach
