= Oubao Moin =

Single by Roy Brown

from the album Distancias
- Released: 1977
- Recorded: 1976
- Genre: Nueva Trova
- Label: Disco Libre
- Songwriter(s): Juan Antonio Corretjer, Roy Brown

"Oubao Moin" is a song by Puerto Rican singer/songwriter Roy Brown. The song is based on a poem from Juan Antonio Corretjer. The name means "Island of Blood," or "Island of a mud" which is what the [Taíno-Kalinago] called Puerto Rico, though the song is entirely in Spanish. The song has been covered by numerous Puerto Rican artists and groups, such as Andrés Jiménez, Haciendo Punto en Otro Son, Lucecita Benítez, and Tito Auger.
