= Antonio Cabán Vale =

Puerto Rican musician (1942–2024)

- Also known as: El Topo
- Born: November 22, 1942
- Origin: Moca, Puerto Rico
- Died: July 23, 2024 (aged 81) San Juan, Puerto Rico
- Genres: Puerto Rican folkloric themes
- Occupations: Composer; singer
- Instrument: Guitar

Antonio Cabán Vale, (November 22, 1942 – July 23, 2024), also known as "El Topo", was a guitarist, singer and composer of Puerto Rican folkloric themes. He was one of the founders of the "new song" movement (Spanish: nueva canción) of the early 1970s. His danza Verde Luz (Green Light) became a popular symbol of national dignity, to the point that it is viewed by many as almost a second national anthem, and has been interpreted by international singers.

== Early life ==
Cabán Vale was born and raised in the town of Moca, which is located in the western part of Puerto Rico, where he received his primary and secondary education. After he graduated from high school, he moved to San Juan and in 1961, enrolled at the University of Puerto Rico. During his student years at the university, he became known as "El Topo" and he wrote poems which were published in the university's publication "Guajana". In 1966, Cabán Vale earned his bachelor's degree in Arts and Social Sciences.

== Musical career ==
For two years Cabán Vale earned a living as a public school teacher. In the 1970s, he began to set his poems to music and later founded a band which he named "Taone". He was the lead singer of the band, which performed his compositions. His compositions contained simple verses and created a new style of contemporary folkloric music which became popular in Puerto Rico. His musical style includes the use of those musical instruments which are typically Puerto Rican, such as the cuatro (a Puerto Rican guitar with five double strings) and the güiro. Some of his compositions were popularized in many different versions.

== Verde Luz ==
One of Cabán Vale's most popular compositions was of the danza genre, titled Verde Luz (Green Light). Verde Luz has been interpreted by the late Argentine singer Ginamaría Hidalgo, and Puerto Rican singers Chucho Avellanet, Roy Brown, Lucecita Benítez, Tony Croatto, Lou Briel, Nano Cabrera, Carmen Nydia Velázquez, José Feliciano, Silverio Pérez, and Dagmar.

== Musical Compositions ==
External audio
- You may listen to Luciano Quiñones piano interpretation "Verde Luz" here
- and as interpreted on YouTube by José Feliciano

Among the songs which Cabán recorded are the following:

- "Flor de Amapola" (Poppy Flower);
- "Qué Bonita Luna" (What a Beautiful Moon);
- "¿Dónde Vas, María?" (Where Are You Going, Maria?);
- "Antonia" (song about Antonia Martínez killed by the police during the 1970 student protest at the University of Puerto Rico);
- "Canciones de Amantes" (Lovers' Songs);
- "Verde Luz" (Green Light);
- "La Patria Va" (The Homeland Counts);
- "Un Metro de Ternura" (A Meter of Tenderness)

== Author ==
Cabán Vale published two books of original poems. The first, entitled Un Lugar Fuera de Tiempo (A Place from Another Time), is based on his experiences as a young man in his hometown of Moca; the second, Penultima Salida (Next-to-Last Exit), deals with his personal quest for "truth".

In 2001, the 6th International Book Fair, celebrated at the Roberto Clemente Coliseum in San Juan, was dedicated to Antonio "El Topo" Cabán Vale.

== Death ==
Cabán Vale died on July 23, 2024, at the age of 81. He was buried at Los Sauces Cemetery in Moca, Puerto Rico.

== See also ==
- List of Puerto Ricans
- Puerto Rican songwriters
