= Clemente Soto Vélez =

Puerto Rican writer and independence advocate

- Clemente Soto Vélez, Far Left Next to Juan Antonio Corretjer and Pedro Albizu Campos
- Born: 1905; Lares, Puerto Rico
- Died: April 15, 1993 (aged 87–88); San Juan, Puerto Rico
- Political party: Puerto Rican Nationalist Party
- Movement: Puerto Rican Independence

Clemente Soto Vélez (1905 – April 15, 1993) was a Puerto Rican nationalist, poet, journalist and activist who mentored many generations of artists in Puerto Rico and New York City. Upon his death in 1993, he left a rich legacy that contributed to the cultural, social and economic life of Puerto Ricans in New York and Latinos everywhere.

== Early years ==
Soto Vélez was born in Lares, Puerto Rico, a town known for "El Grito de Lares" of 1868, a rebellion against Spanish colonial rule. His parents died when he was seven years old and he went to live with his godfather who raised him. He received his primary education in Lares and later studied painting in the City of Arecibo under the guidance of Ildefonso Ruiz Vélez. In 1918, he moved to San Juan, the capital of Puerto Rico and lived with his sister. In San Juan, Soto Vélez studied electrical engineering and business administration at the Ramírez Commercial School. There he also met and befriended poets such as Alfredo Margenat (father of Hugo Margenat) and Pedro Carrasquillo. In 1928, Soto Vélez worked as a journalist for the newspaper "El Tiempo", where he published many of his works. He was dismissed from "El Tiempo" after he wrote an article criticizing the injustices committed against the working class by the American-controlled sugar industry in Puerto Rico.

== Atalayismo ==
In 1928, Soto Vélez together with Margenat, Carrasquillo and joined by poets Graciany Miranda Archilla and together with Fernando González Alberti, Luis Hernández Aquino, Samuel Lugo, Juan Calderón Escobar and Antonio Cruz Nieves founded the group "El Atalaya de los Dioses" which turned into the literary movement known as "Atalayismo." The "El Grupo Atalaya" movement sought to connect the poetic/literary world with political action and most of its members, including Soto Vélez, became involved with the Puerto Rican Nationalist Party.

== Nationalist ==
Clemente Soto Vélez with Juan Antonio Corretjer and Pedro Albizu Campos (L to R) during their detention in 1936.

Soto Vélez became a militant member of the Nationalist Party which sought Puerto Rico's independence from U.S. colonial rule and served as Party organizer in the city of Caguas. Soto Vélez also contributed to "El Nacionalista", the political news organ of the Nationalist Party. He took part in an attempt to take over the capital building in San Juan in 1932, and in 1934 was arrested and jailed for helping to instigate and participating in a sugar workers' strike.

In 1935, four Nationalists were killed by the police under the command of Colonel E. Francis Riggs. The incident became known as the Río Piedras massacre. The following year in 1936, two members of the Cadets of the Republic, the Nationalist youth organization, Hirám Rosado and Elías Beauchamp assassinated Colonel Riggs. They were arrested and executed, without a trial, at police headquarters in San Juan.

On April 3, 1936, a Federal Grand Jury submitted accusations against Soto Vélez, Pedro Albizu Campos, Juan Antonio Corretjer, Luis F. Velázquez and the following members of the Cadets of the Republic: Erasmo Velázquez, Julio H. Velázquez, Rafael Ortiz Pacheco, Juan Gallardo Santiago, and Pablo Rosado Ortiz. They were charged with sedition and other violations of Title 18 of the United States Code. Title 18 of the United States Code is the criminal and penal code of the federal government of the United States. It deals with federal crimes and criminal procedure. As evidence, the prosecution referred to the creation, organization and the activities of the cadets, which the government made reference to as the "Liberating Army of Puerto Rico". The government prosecutors stated that the military tactics which the Cadets were taught was for the sole purpose of overthrowing the Government of the U.S. A jury composed of seven Puerto Ricans and five Americans ended with a hung jury. Judge Robert A. Cooper called for a new jury, this time composed of ten Americans and two Puerto Ricans, and a guilty verdict was reached.

Soto Vélez was sentenced to seven years in prison which he served at the United States Federal Penitentiary at Atlanta, Georgia. In 1937, while in prison, his friends published his first book, Escalio, a philosophical essay. In 1940, he was pardoned and returned to Puerto Rico only to be arrested once more for violating the conditions of his release. He was sent to prison at Lewisburg, Pennsylvania, where he met Earl Browder, Secretary General of the Communist Party of the U.S.A. In 1942, after serving two years in prison, Soto Vélez was released and not allowed to return to Puerto Rico.

== Activist ==
Soto Vélez went to live in New York City and in 1943, joined the Communist Party. He was involved with Vito Marcantonio's political campaigns and the American Labor Party. He worked for the Spanish Grocer's Association, Inc., and later founded Puerto Rican Merchants Association, Inc. which he directed through the 1970s. Among the cultural organizations which he founded were the "Club Cultural del Bronx" (Bronx Cultural Club) and Casa Borinquen. He also served as the president of the Círculo de Escritores y Poetas Iberoamericanos (Circle of Ibero American Poets and Writers) and was a member of the Instituto de Puerto Rico en Nueva York (Puerto Rican Institute of New York). In 1950, he founded a magazine titled La Voz de Puerto Rico en Estados Unidos (The Voice of Puerto Rico in the United States).

== Written works by and about Clemente Soto Vélez ==
The following is a selection of Soto Vélez's written work:

- Clemente Soto Vélez and Amanda Vélez Papers at Hunter College of the City University of New York (CUNY):
- La Tierra Prometida by Clemente Soto Vélez (San Juan: Instituto de Cultura Puertorriqueña, 1979)
- Obra poética by Clemente Soto Vélez (San Juan, Puerto Rico: Instituto de Cultura Puertorriqueña, 1989)
- Simposio Clemente Soto Vélez (San Juan, Puerto Rico: Instituto de Cultura Puertorriqueña; 1. ed edition, 1990)
- Kaligrafiando: Conversaciones con Clemente Soto Vélez by Marithelma Costa and Alvin Joaquin Figueroa (Rio Piedras, Puerto Rico: La Editorial Universidad de Puerto Rico; 1. ed edition, January 1990)
- The Blood that Keeps Singing (a bilingual edition translated into Spanish by Martín Espada & Camilo Pérez-Bustillo) by Clemente Soto Vélez (Willimantic, CT: Curbstone Press, 2001)

== Later years ==
Soto Vélez met Amanda Andrea Vélez, who became his wife. His wife was a political activist in Argentina and was a member of the Socialist Party of Argentina. She was involved in Soto Vélez's work and inspired him to write, while she promoted his work by organizing events on his behalf. In the 1980s, the couple moved to Puerto Rico. Soto Vélez died from emphysema in Puerto Rico on April 15, 1993. He was buried in his hometown of Lares, Puerto Rico.

In 1995 on the Lower East Side of Manhattan (also known as Loisaida), author Edgardo Vega Yunqué and actor-director Nelson Landrieu founded the Clemente Soto Vélez Cultural and Educational Center (also known as the "CSV") to continue Clemente's legacy.

== See also ==
- List of Puerto Rican writers
- List of Puerto Ricans
- Puerto Rican literature
- Puerto Rican Nationalist Party Revolts of the 1950s
- Puerto Rican Nationalist Party
