= Radio Pirata =

Puerto Rican rock band

Radio Pirata was a Rock en Español band from Puerto Rico. Rucco Gandía formed the band in 1994.

The band achieved success with hit songs like "El Loco" (The Madman). It was then that Fonovisa signed them up to release their first album. The album spawned hits like "No Me Dejes Así" (Don't Leave Me Like This) "Historia Real" (Real Story) and the #1 hit "Todavía". They won a Tu Música award in 1995 for Best Record and a Gold Momo in 1996 for Best Local Rock Band. In 1998 they followed with their second album, Todavía (Still).

Radio Pirata's debut was in 1993 and it was the first Puerto Rican rock band to perform at the Centro de Bellas Artes, Puerto Rico's most prestigious venue. Their line up at that time was: Raül Reyes (brother of former Menudo member Ray Reyes) on lead vocals & rhythm guitars, Gandia on bass, Roberto Torres on guitar, Roberto "Bobby" Trinidad on percussion, Nitayno Arayoán on drums and Rafael Carrasquillo on keyboards.

In 1997, Reyes decided to leave the band and continue his career as a voiceover professional and also continued to collaborate as a vocal arranger & producer for other international artists as Luis Fonsi, Charly García, Menudo, Ignacio Peña and Ricky Martín, among others.

== See also ==
- Rock en Español
- Puerto Rican rock
- Pirate radio
