= Zoraida Santiago =

Puerto Rican singer

- Birth name: Zoraida Santiago Buitrago
- Born: May 25, 1952 (age 73) Santurce, Puerto Rico
- Genres: Puerto Rican folkloric music
- Occupation(s): Composer and singer
- Instrument(s): Piano and guitar

Dr. Zoraida Santiago Buitrago (born May 25, 1952) is a composer and singer of Puerto Rican folkloric themes.

== Early years ==
Santiago (birth name:Zoraida Santiago Buitrago) was born in Santurce, Puerto Rico to Domingo Santiago and Zayda Buitrago. She was raised and educated in Santurce and at a very young age became interest in musical instruments. Her parents had her take piano lessons as a child. She also took lessons about musical composition and harmony. Santiago is a self-taught guitarist. After graduating from high school, Santiago moved to New York City where she pursued her university studies in anthropology.

== Musical career ==
External audio
- You may listen to Zoraida Santiago's "Canta poema de Julia de Burgos" on YouTube.

In 1978, she met fellow Puerto Rican singer Roy Brown. Santiago joined Brown's musical group, Aires Bucaneros, and participated in the recordings of Aires Bucaneros (1979) and Casi Alba (1980). Both albums contain compositions by Santiago. These are "Prisa Loca" (Crazy Rush), "De la Tierra en que Naci" (From the land I was born) and "Canciones para Vieques" (Songs for Vieques). Santiago went on tour with the group to various countries.

In 1982, Santiago returned to Puerto Rico and made her "first" solo recording, "Tiene que ser la Luna" (It must be the Moon). During that decade she also participated in and produced some local theatrical productions. Among these were Las Bohemias, Mujeres Sin Hombres (Women without Men), Matutina and Tres Momentos (Three moments). She traveled to Mexico and the United States with the theatrical group.

Santiago composed, interpreted and recorded the music for the movie made for T.V. Luisa Capetillo, Pasión de justicia (Luisa Capetillo, Passion for Justice), directed by Sonia Fritz. In 1985, she held a concert titled Antillanas at the Sylvia Rexach theater in San Juan. In 1994, Santiago recorded Canciones Sublevadas, which included various of her compositions plus some poems of Julia de Burgos to which she added music.

In 2002, Santiago and Roy Brown recorded Bohemia, which included boleros from different composers, such as Pedro Flores – "Bajo la Palma" (Under the Palm Tree) – and Rafael Hernández – "Silencio" (Silence). Their album was nominated for a Tu Musica Award for best bolero recording of the year.

== Later years ==
Santiago earned her Doctorate Degree in Anthropology and is a professor of Social Sciences in the University of Puerto Rico. She also belongs to a group of singers who operate an Internet radiotrova. She has a program called Magia de la Cancion (Song's Magic). In April 2004, Santiago released her latest album "Del Sueño al Hecho" (From Dreams to Reality).

In early 2008, Santiago's Conciones Por Todas Partes won in The 7th Annual Independent Music Awards for Best Latin Song. In May 2010, Santiago together with Danny Rivera, Silverio Pérez, Carlos Esteban Fonseca, Tito Auger and the Puerto Rico Symphony Orchestra provided the students who were on strike at the University of Puerto Rico with cultural and musical performances.

== See also ==
- List of Puerto Ricans
- List of Puerto Rican songwriters
- Music of Puerto Rico
