= Roy Brown (Puerto Rican musician) =

Puerto Rican composer and singer (born 1945)

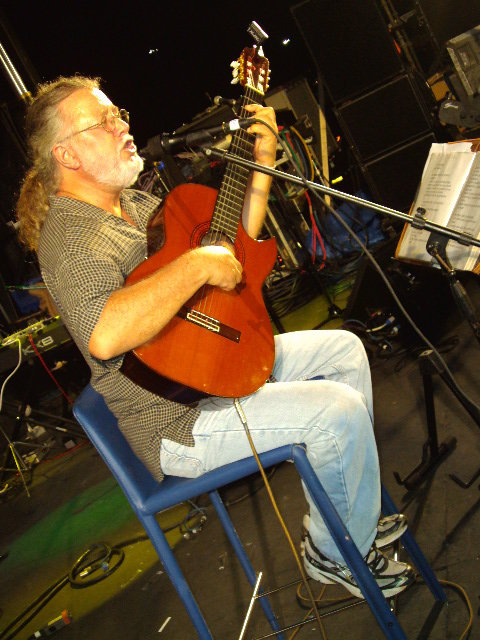

Background information
- Birth name: Roy Brown Ramírez
- Born: July 18, 1945 (age 79); Orlando, Florida, U.S.
- Genres: Puerto Rican folk music and Nova Trova
- Occupation(s): Musician, singer
- Instrument: Guitar
- Years active: 1960–present
- Website: www.roybrown.com

Roy Brown Ramírez (born July 18, 1945) is a Puerto Rican musician and singer.

== Early years ==
Brown's father was an American naval officer and his mother a native of Puerto Rico. Brown was raised during turbulent times in the United States. Among the important issues of those days were racism, the Civil Rights Movement and the Vietnam War. Most of these events went on to form an important part in his ideals and his way of thinking.

In the late-1960s Brown graduated from Academia del Perpetuo Socorro, later enrolled in the University of Puerto Rico. He enjoyed writing poems and while he was a student, he became actively involved in groups against the Vietnam War, poor living conditions, and especially in favor of the independence movement of Puerto Rico. Brown was also involved in the student disturbances which spread throughout the university, by participating in the protest and picket lines.

== First Recordings ==
During this period he recorded two albums, Yo Protesto (1970) and Basta Ya... Revolución. During that decade he also recorded: Roy Brown III, La Profecía de Urayoán and Distancias. Brown's personal life started to suffer because of his political beliefs. He got into trouble with the police, his father and brother didn't want anything to do with him and he was fired from his job in the university. His mother was also dying.

In the late-1970s, Brown moved to New York City and formed a group called Aires Bucaneros, with fellow musicians Zoraida Santiago, Carl Royce, Pablo Nieves, and Rucco Gandía, among others. The group traveled and performed in many countries such as Greece, Germany, Spain, Mexico, Ecuador, Cuba, the Netherlands, Nicaragua, and Costa Rica. He recorded Aires Bucaneros (1979), Casi Alba (1980), Nuyol (1983), Árboles (1987) and Balada de Otro Tiempo (1989). Arboles was produced by Silvio Rodríguez, in Cuba.

== Return To Puerto Rico ==
In 1988, Brown returned to Puerto Rico and held a concert at the University of Puerto Rico which completely sold out. The first time he held a concert alone at the same place in the 1970s, only thirteen people showed up.

Among Brown's recordings in the 1990s were: Distancias en Vivo (1990), Nocturno (1991), Poetas Puertorriqueños (1992), and En Fuga (1995). In 1996, he released a two-disc album called Colección (1996) containing the best of his musical trajectory through the Puerto Rican music scene. In 1997, Silvio Rodríguez visited Puerto Rico and held a concert with Brown at the Hiram Bithorn Stadium, with a soldout audience of 19,000 people.

== Recording with Zoraida Santiago ==
In 2000 Brown reunited with his Aires Bucaneros partner, Zoraida Santiago. Together they released the album, Bohemia. Showing signs of musical growth, Roy continued to release quality albums in the late-1990s and early-2000s with Poeta en San Juan (1999), Noche de Roy Brown (1999), Album (2000) and Balcon del Fin del Mundo (2004).

On June 7, 2003, Brown let WPKN FM of Bridgeport, Connecticut record his set in the historic Plaza de la Revolución in Lares, Puerto Rico. WPKN also recorded Roy's "Ofelia" live from the Nuyorican Cafe in Old San Juan. On February 8, 2004, Brown held a concert in the Antonio Paoli Hall at the Luis A. Ferré Center of the Fine Arts in San Juan to celebrate his 35 years of music trajectory and the shows were all sold-out. Brown performs regularly in the Claridad festival, honoring Claridad, a Puerto Rican newspaper which advocates independence. Joan Manuel Serrat, Susana Baca, Fiel a la Vega, Cultura Profética, Celia Cruz and Lucecita Benítez are among the many artists that have recorded songs written by Roy Brown Ramírez.

== Recent events ==
In 2006 Brown recorded an album, titled Que Vaya Bien, with Tao Rodríguez-Seeger from The Mammals and Tito Auger, the frontman for Puerto Rican rock group Fiel A La Vega. A single from this record, "El Banquete de Los Sánchez" (whose lyrics were based on an essay by Puerto Rican writer Luis Rafael Sánchez), was censored by some Puerto Rican radio stations due to the use of the slang term "chicho" (a love handle in Puerto Rican Spanish, but erroneously interpreted in this case as a verb tense for the slang term for sexual intercourse, "chichar"). Public backlash against the censorship attempt guaranteed radio airplay and good sales for the record (reportedly 30,000 copies in two months) during late 2006. After marrying Puerto Rican former tennis player Emilie Viqueira, Brown moved to Mayagüez, Puerto Rico (Viqueira's birthplace), where he currently resides.

== Discography ==
- Yo Protesto (1969)
- Basta Ya... Revolución (1971)
- Roy Brown III (1973)
- La Profecía de Urayoán (1976)
- Distancias (1977)
- Aires Bucaneros (1979)
- Casi Alba (1980)
- Nuyol (1983)
- Árboles (1987, with Silvio Rodríguez)
- Balada de Otro Tiempo (1989)
- Distancias en Vivo (1990)
- Nocturno (1991)
- Poetas Puertorriqueños (1992)
- En Fuga (1994)
- Colección (1996)
- Poeta en San Juan (1998)
- La Noche de Roy Brown (1999)
- Álbum 1970-1976 (2000)
- Bohemia (with Zoraida Santiago) (2000)
- Balcón del Fin del Mundo (2004)
- Yo protesto: Homenaje a Roy Brown (2005)
- Que Vaya Bien (2006)
- 1970: El Concierto (2007)
- Electrochócame (2009)
- Niños Sol (2017, ballet with Tato Santiago)
- Nueva Coleccíon (2018)
- Habanandando (2019)

== See also ==
- List of Puerto Rican songwriters
