= Luis Palés Matos =

Puerto Rican writer (1898–1959)

- Luis Palés Matos
- Born: March 20, 1898; Guayama, Puerto Rico
- Died: February 23, 1959 (aged 60); San Juan, Puerto Rico
- Occupation: Poet
- Writing career
- Genre: Afro-Antillano

Luis Palés Matos (March 20, 1898 – February 23, 1959) was a Puerto Rican poet who is credited with creating the poetry genre known as Afro-Antillano. He is also credited with writing the screenplay for the "Romance Tropical", the first Puerto Rican film with sound.

== Early years ==
Palés Matos was born in Guayama, Puerto Rico into a family of well-known poets. His mother was also a poet as was his father Vicente Palés Anés, who has a school named after him in Guayama. His siblings include Vicente, Gustavo, Consuelo and Josefa. His family was instrumental in his poetic development and is reflected when at the age of 17 he wrote and published his first book of poetry titled "Azaleas" (1915). In high school he edited the school's monthly publication "Mehr Licht". His family's financial situation was bad and he was forced to drop out of high school and earn a living working in various jobs.

== Diepalismo movement ==
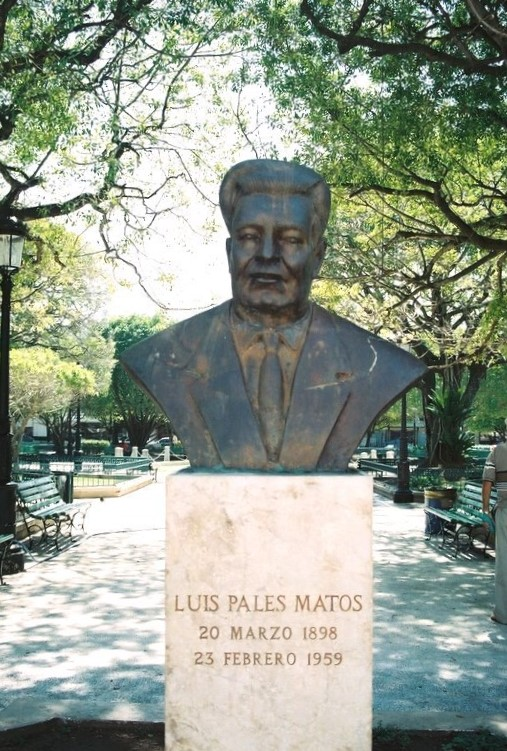
Luis Palés Matos Bust in Guayama, Puerto Rico

In 1918, he moved to the town of Fajardo where he worked for El Pueblo, the town's local newspaper. There he met a young lady by the name of Natividad Suliveres and soon married her. Natividad gave birth to a baby boy, but within a year his wife died of tuberculosis. Palés Matos was devastated and expressed his grief in the poem "El palacio en sombras" (The palace in shadows). He moved to San Juan and worked for the daily newspapers, El Mundo and El Imparcial. In San Juan he met and befriended José I. de Diego Padró, a fellow poet and together they created a literary movement known as "Diepalismo", a name derived from the combination of their surnames.

== Afro-Antillano poems ==
In 1926, a local newspaper La Democracia published "Pueblo negro" (Black town), the first known Afro-Antillano poem. This marked the start of a new genre in Latin American literature which blended words from the Afro-Caribbean culture into the Spanish verse of Puerto Rico. These poems were immediately and criticized by white, mainstream Puerto Rican intellectuals who viewed black issues as not being noteworthy or appropriate topics for high literature. In 1932, Palés Matos began publishing Afro-Puerto Rican poetry, which was immediately panned by critics due to its cultural background. Critic Luis Antonio Miranda claimed that "the so-called black art has no link to Puerto Rico". Poet Graciany Miranda Archilla was more scathing, labelling what he called "prieta (a colloquial word for "black") poetry in Puerto Rico" a "joke".

In 1934, Palés Matos wrote the screenplay for Romance Tropical, the first Puerto Rican movie with sound and the second Spanish movie with sound in the world. The movie, which was produced and directed by Juan Emilio Viguié, dealt with the romance between a poor boy and a rich girl. Romance Tropical, which was distributed in theaters throughout Puerto Rico and New York by Pedro Juanera, was an astounding success. The film promised to give the Puerto Rican film industry international recognition, however the development of the industry was affected when a dispute over the copyrights between the Canino family (investors) and Viguié became public knowledge.

In 1937, Palés Matos published Tuntún de pasa y grifería (Drumbeats of Kinkiness and Blackness). This collection of poems received an award of recognition from the Puerto Rican Institute of Literature. Palés Matos gained fame with his literary work. Though Palés Matos is considered, together with the Afro-Cuban poet Nicolás Guillén, the father of the "Negrismo" movement, he was also criticized by members of the black Puerto Rican community, who considered it an insult to their race that Palés Matos, a light-skinned man, was becoming famous on their account. Nevertheless, black Puerto Rican performers such as Sylvia del Villard and Juan Boria recited Palés Matos's poetry.

Other figures of Afro-Puerto Rican and Afro-Caribbean poetry include Abelardo Díaz Alfaro (1916–1999) who also wrote Afro-Antillano lyrics and Angelamaria Davila (1944–2003) who wrote Afro-feminist poetry in the 1970s.

== Works ==
Some of Palés Matos' works are:

- El palacio en sombras (The Palace in Shadows)
- Pueblo negro (Black Town)
- Danza negra (Black Dance)
- Canción festiva para ser llorada (A festival song to cry for)
- Falsa canción de baquiné (False Song of a funeral for a child)
- Largarto verde (Green Lizard)
- Plena del Menéalo
- Tuntún de pasa y grifería (Drumbeats of kinkiness and blackness)
- Majestad negra (Black Majesty)

== Later years ==
In 1957, his written work, "Poesías" was acclaimed by the Academy of the Spanish language. Palés Matos was selected by the faculty of the University of Puerto Rico as their conference representative. Palés Matos died of heart failure in San Juan on February 23, 1959. He was buried at the Puerto Rico Memorial Cemetery in Carolina, Puerto Rico.

== Legacy ==
Casa Luis Palés Matos in Guayama is a residence museum dedicated to the memory of the poet.

There is a public school in Puerto Rico named after Palés Matos, in the town of Bayamón and a public housing complex in Guayama.

The school of Humanities of the University of Puerto Rico has a building named after him.

The Spanglish comic novel "Yo-Yo Boing!" by Nuyorican poet Giannina Braschi pays tribute to the Afro-Antillano poems of Palés Matos and the lyric poetry of Julia de Burgos who are both the subject of a debate among several characters in the novel.

Singer/songwriter Roy Brown formed a group in the late 70s called Aires Bucaneros, which is the title of one of Palés Matos poems. The group released an eponymous album in 1979, featuring a song based on the poem. After that, Brown has written several songs based on Palés Matos poems.

== See also ==
- List of Puerto Rican writers
- List of Puerto Ricans
- Puerto Rican literature
