= Juan Antonio Corretjer =

Puerto Rican politician (1908–1985)

Juan Antonio Corretjer Montes
- Juan Antonio Corretjer Montes, Poet and Secretary General of the Puerto Rican Nationalist Party and founder and leader of la Liga Socialista Puertorriqueña.
- Born: March 3, 1908; Ciales, Puerto Rico
- Died: January 19, 1985 (aged 76); San Juan, Puerto Rico
- Organization: Liga Socialista Puertorriqueña
- Political party: Puerto Rican Nationalist Party
- Movement: Puerto Rican Independence

Juan Antonio Corretjer Montes (March 3, 1908 – January 19, 1985) was a Puerto Rican poet, journalist and pro-independence political activist opposing United States rule in Puerto Rico.

== Early years ==
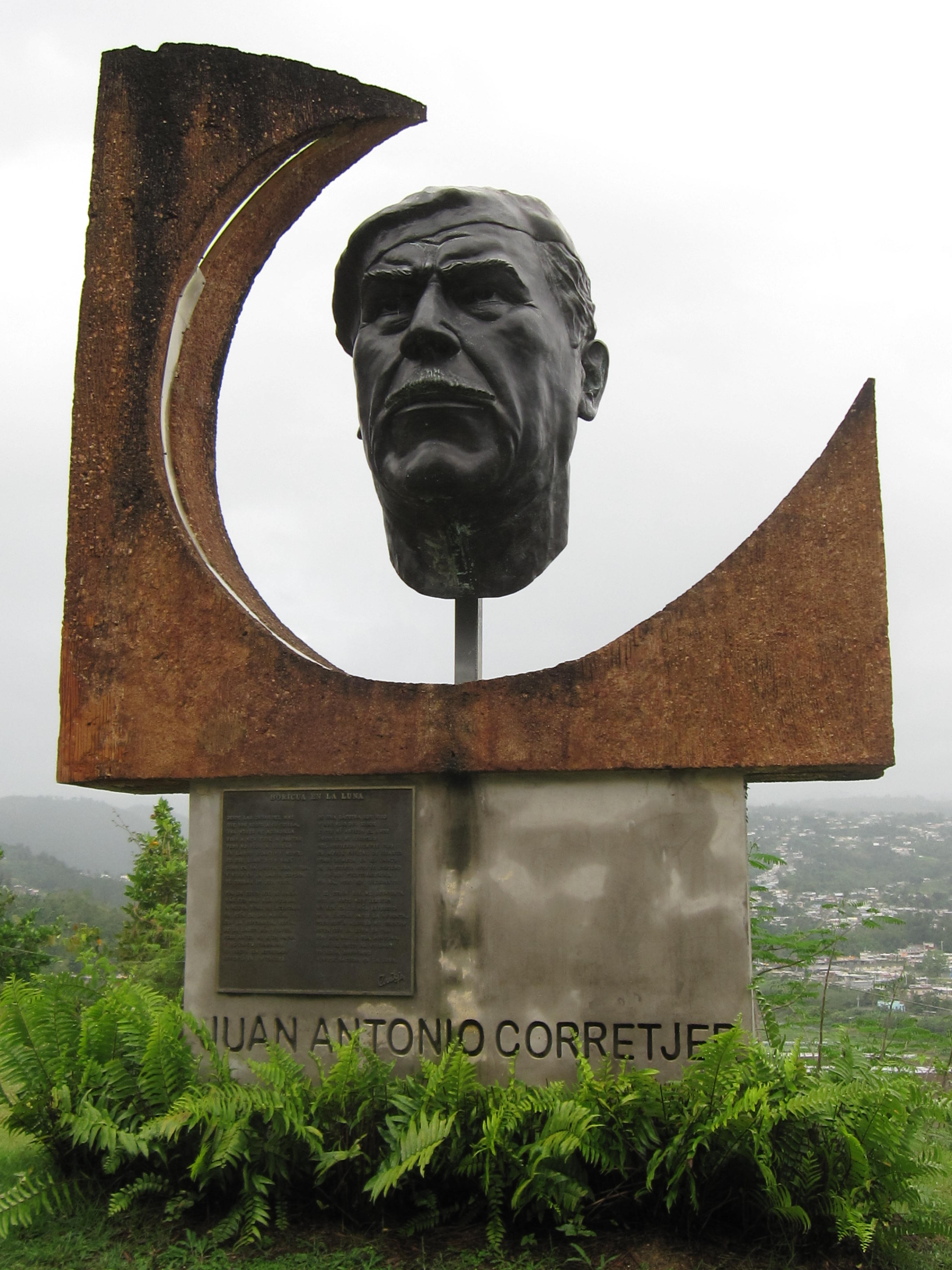
Juan Antonio Corretjer monument

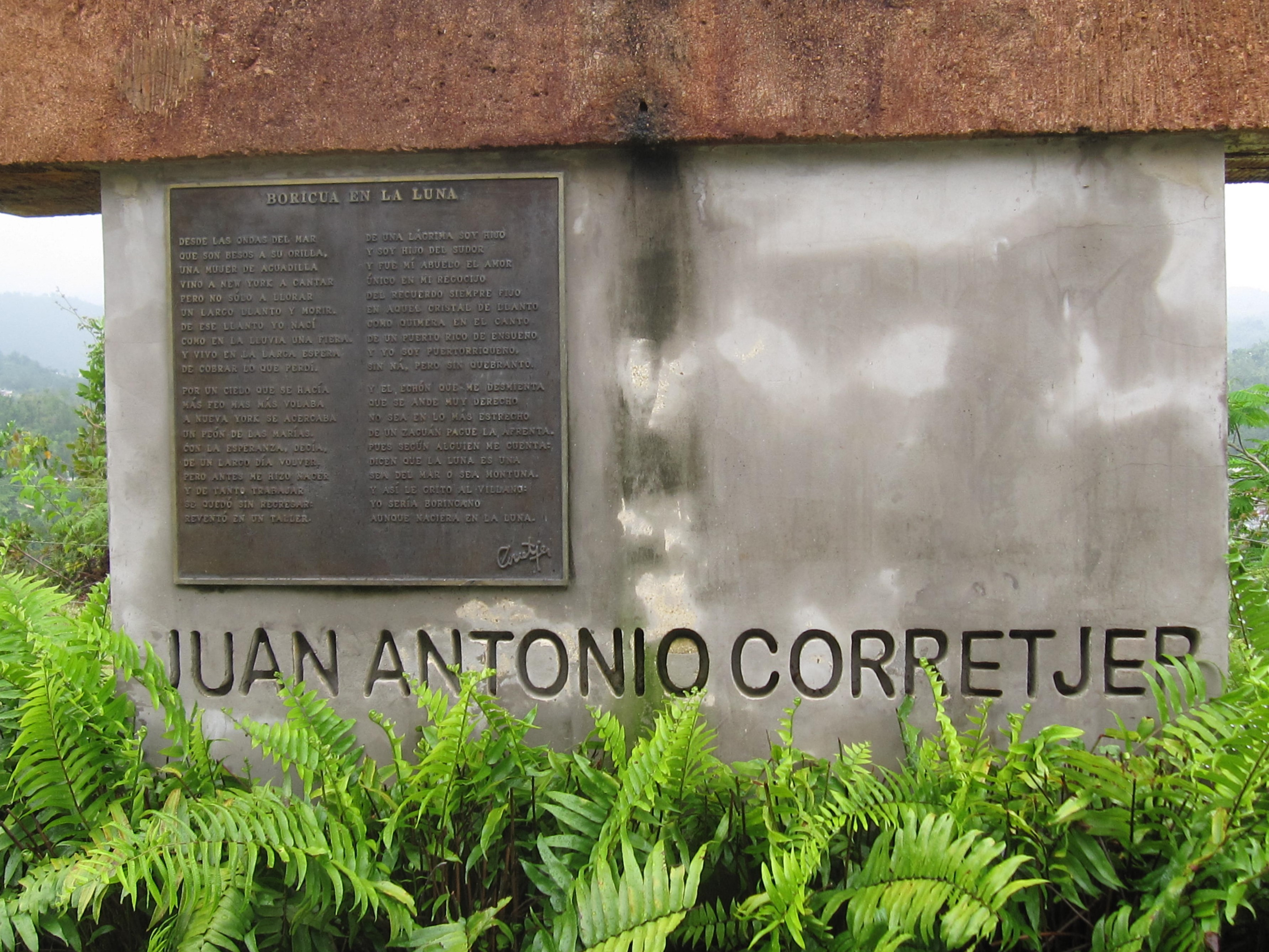
Juan Antonio Corretjer monument

Corretjer (birth name: Juan Antonio Corretjer Montes) was born in Ciales, Puerto Rico, into a politically active pro-independence family. His parents were Diego Corretjer Hernández and María Brígida Montes González. His father and uncles were involved in the "Ciales Uprising" of August 13, 1898, against the Spanish occupation. As a boy, he would often accompany his father and uncles to political rallies. He received his primary and secondary education in his hometown. In 1920, when he was only 12 years old, Corretjer wrote his first poem "Canto a Ciales" (I sing to Ciales). In 1924, Corretjer published his first booklet of poems.

Corretjer joined the "Literary Society of José Gautier Benítez", which later would be renamed the "Nationalist Youth", while he was still in elementary school. When he was in 8th grade, he organized a student protest against the United States in his town. He was expelled from his local high school for organizing a strike to have it renamed for José de Diego. Corretjer was then sent to school in the town of Vega Baja.

== Nationalist youth ==
In 1927, he moved to San Juan and worked as a journalist for the newspaper "La Democracia". He later moved to the city of Ponce where he published his first two books of poetry: "Agüeybaná" (1932) and "Ulises" (1933). Throughout his life, he wrote for various newspapers and publications in Puerto Rico, Cuba and the United States.

In 1935, Corretjer travelled to Cuba and joined an anti-Batista group whose aim was to overthrow the U.S.-backed Cuban dictator. He also traveled to Haiti and to the Dominican Republic looking for international support for Puerto Rico's independence movement.

In 1935, four Nationalists were killed by the police under the command of Colonel E. Francis Riggs. The incident became known as the Río Piedras massacre. The following year in 1936, two members of the Cadets of the Republic, the Nationalist youth organization, Hiram Rosado and Elías Beauchamp assassinated Colonel Riggs. They were arrested and executed, without a trial, at police headquarters in San Juan.

In 1936, Corretjer met and became friends with the nationalist leader Pedro Albizu Campos. He was named Secretary General of the Puerto Rican Nationalist Party.

On April 3, 1936, a Federal Grand Jury submitted accusations against Pedro Albizu Campos, Juan Antonio Corretjer, Luis F. Velázquez, Clemente Soto Vélez and the following members of the Cadets of the Republic: Erasmo Velázquez, Julio H. Velázquez, Rafael Ortiz Pacheco, Juan Gallardo Santiago, and Pablo Rosado Ortiz. They were charged with sedition and other violations of Title 18 of the United States Code. Title 18 of the United States Code is the criminal and penal code of the federal government of the United States. It deals with federal crimes and criminal procedure. As evidence, the prosecution referred to the creation, organization and the activities of the cadets, which the government made reference to as the "Liberating Army of Puerto Rico". The government prosecutors stated that the military tactics which the cadets were taught was for the sole purpose of overthrowing the Government of the U.S. A jury composed of seven Puerto Ricans and five Americans ended with a hung jury. Judge Robert A. Cooper called for a new jury, this time composed of ten Americans and two Puerto Ricans, and a guilty verdict was reached. Corretjer was sent to the infamous La Princesa prison for one year in 1937, because he refused to hand over to the American authorities the Book of Acts of the Nationalists Party, as result of his political beliefs.

In 1937 a group of lawyers, including a young Gilberto Concepción de Gracia, tried in vain to defend the Nationalists, but the Boston Court of Appeals, which held appellate jurisdiction over federal matters in Puerto Rico, upheld the verdict. Albizu Campos and the other Nationalist leaders were sent to the Federal penitentiary in Atlanta, Georgia.

== Puerto Rico's Gag Law ==
On May 21, 1948, a bill was introduced before the Puerto Rican Senate which would restrain the rights of the independence and Nationalist movements on the archipelago. The Senate, controlled by the Partido Popular Democrático (PPD) and presided by Luis Muñoz Marín, approved the bill that day. This bill, which resembled the anti-communist Smith Act passed in the United States in 1940, became known as the Ley de la Mordaza (Gag Law) when the U.S.-appointed governor of Puerto Rico, Jesús T. Piñero, signed it into law on June 10, 1948.

Under this new law it would be a crime to print, publish, sell, or exhibit any material intended to paralyze or destroy the insular government; or to organize any society, group or assembly of people with a similar destructive intent. It made it illegal to display a Puerto Rican flag, sing a patriotic song, and reinforced the 1898 law that had made it illegal to display the Flag of Puerto Rico, with anyone found guilty of disobeying the law in any way being subject to a sentence of up to ten years imprisonment, a fine of up to US$10,000 (equivalent to $134,000 in 2025), or both. According to Leopoldo Figueroa, a member of the Puerto Rico House of Representatives, the law was repressive and was in violation of the First Amendment of the US Constitution which guarantees Freedom of Speech. He pointed out that the law as such was a violation of the civil rights of the people of Puerto Rico.

== Nationalist Party Revolts of the 1950s ==
On October 30, 1950, the Nationalists staged uprisings in the towns of Ponce, Mayagüez, Naranjito, Arecibo, Utuado (Utuado Uprising), San Juan (San Juan Nationalist revolt), and Jayuya (Jayuya Uprising).

Known as the Puerto Rican Nationalist Party Revolts of the 1950s, the revolts were a widespread call for independence by the Puerto Rican Nationalist Party, against United States Government rule over Puerto Rico. It specifically repudiated the so-called "Free Associated State" (Estado Libre Asociado) designation of Puerto Rico - a designation widely recognized as a colonial farce.

The revolts failed because of the overwhelming force used by the U.S. military, the Puerto Rican National Guard, the FBI, the CIA, and the Puerto Rican Insular Police - all of whom were aligned against the Nationalists. This force included the machine-gunning of Nationalists all over the island, and the aerial bombing of the town of Jayuya. Hundreds of Cadets and Nationalists, among them Corretjer, were arrested by mid-November 1950, and the party was never the same.

== Poetry and essays ==
=== Literary style and themes ===
The themes and inspiration for his poems and essays were devoted to his defense of his native land. Corretjer's epic poem "Alabanza en la Torre de Ciales" (Praise in the tower of Ciales) (1953), is considered one of the representative works of the "neocriollismo" movement and has had a strong influence on many later poets. In Corretjer's poetry the Taino is no longer an idealized figure but allegory of revolutionary legacy. In the prologue of "Yerba bruja", Corretjer states it was not his intent to "dig up a mummy" but to bring to light "the splendor of the indigenous imagination that lives on in our own."

His poetry spans several decades and transcended any particular literary movement. The Puerto Rican Athenaeum awarded him the honorary title of Puerto Rico National Poet.

=== Selected list of works ===
External audio
- You may listen to Juan Antonio Corretjer and Roy Brown's interpretation on YouTube of "Boricua en la Luna"

Poetry

- "Agüeybaná" (1932),
- "Amor a Puerto Rico" (1937) (Love of Puerto Rico),
- "Cántico de Guerra" (1937) (Song of War),
- "El Leñero" (1944) (Timberman),
- "Tierra Nativa" (1951) (Native Land),
- "Yerba Bruja" (1957) (Bewitched Grass)

Puerto Rican musician Roy Brown Ramírez set many of Corretjer's poems to music, particularly "Boricua en la luna", "En la vida todo es ir" (later versioned by artists such as Joan Manuel Serrat, Mercedes Sosa, Antonio Cabán Vale, Haciendo Punto en Otro Son, Fiel A La Vega, Lucecita Benítez and others), "Distancias", "Diana de Guilarte" and "Oubao-Moín".

Essays

- "Llorens"
- "Juicio Histórico" (Historic Trial)
- "La Revolución de Lares" (The Revolution of Lares)
- "Nuestra Bandera" (Our Flag)

Published books

- "Albizu Campos and the Ponce massacre" (1965)

This book, sometimes called a pamphlet, was written in English as it was intended for the U.S. American public audience. Its purpose was to raise conscience among the American people about the event of the Ponce Massacre as most Americans had never heard of the involvement of the US government and the US media in that massacre. The pamphlet, currently (January 2014) out of print, was reprinted in its entirely as Chapter 19 in Francisco Hernandez Vazquez's book Latino/a Thought (pp 377–404). Rowman & Littlefield Publishers. 2009.

- "Imagen De Borinquen, IV Yerba Bruja", (1970)
- "Aguinaldo escarlata", (1974)
- "Aguinaldo escarlata", (1974)
- "Prisionero 70495", 1976
- "Pausa Para El Amor", (1976)
- "La lucha por la independencia de Puerto Rico", (1977)
- "Obra Poética"
- "Paso a Venezuela", (1977)
- "El Cumplido", (1979)
- "Los dias de conta dos", (1984)

Published Posthumously

- "Alabanzas: Antología", (2000)
- "Yerba bruja", (1992)

== Legacy ==
The Instituto de Cultura Puertorriqueña (The Institute of Puerto Rican Culture) published a collection of his poems in 1976. Corretjer died in San Juan, Puerto Rico, on January 19, 1985. He was buried at Antiguo Cementerio Municipal in Ciales, Puerto Rico. A high school in Ciales is named after Corretjer. A monument of Corretjer is found at Spanish: Paseo Lineal Juan Antonio Corretjer, a lookout in Ciales.

His granddaughter is Puerto Rican singer and actress Millie Corretjer.

== See also ==
- Puerto Rican Nationalist Party Revolts of the 1950s
- List of Puerto Rican writers
- List of Puerto Ricans
- Puerto Rican literature
