= List of Puerto Rican writers =

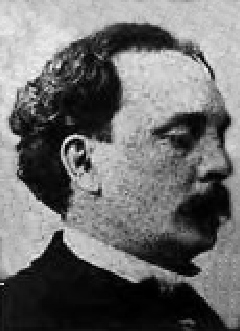
Alejandro Tapia y Rivera

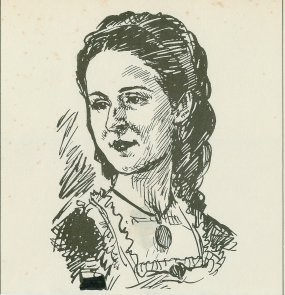
Alejandrina Benitez de Gautier

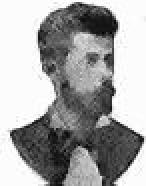
José Gautier Benítez

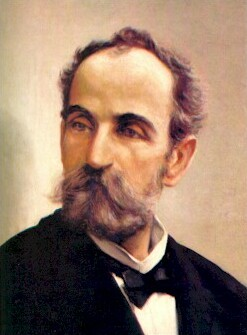
Eugenio María de Hostos

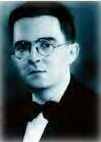
Antonio S. Pedreira

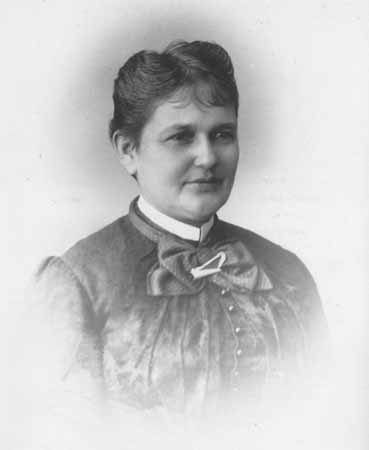
Lola Rodríguez de Tió

This is a list of Puerto Rican literary figures, including poets, novelists, short story authors, and playwrights. It includes people who were born in Puerto Rico, people who are of Puerto Rican ancestry, and long-term residents or immigrants who have made Puerto Rico their home and who are recognized for their literary work.

== A ==
- Manuel Abreu Adorno (1955–1984), novelist
- Rafael Acevedo (born 1960), poet, playwright, fiction writer
- Aravind Enrique Adyanthaya (born 1965), writer, performer, and theater director
- Moisés Agosto Rosario (born 1965), poet and author
- Alfredo M. Aguayo, educator and writer (1866–1948). Established the first laboratory of child psychology at the University of Havana.
- Jack Agüeros (1934–2014), author, playwright, poet and translator
- Miguel Algarín (1941–2020), poet, writer. Co-founder of the Nuyorican Poets Cafe.
- Manuel A. Alonso (1822–1889), poet and author. Considered by many to be the first Puerto Rican writer of notable importance.
- Aldo Alvarez, short-story writer
- Silvia Álvarez Curbelo (born 1940), writer and historian
- Joe Elvis Alway (1969-) is a Nuyorican playwright, social justice leader, educator, and award winner. Wrote "We Are The Whole Cast," "Sabor Nutcracker," "The Front Porch," "540 Southern Blvd.," and is the "Founder of Multicultural Arts Foundation." https://voyagestl.com/?post_type=interview&p=104961, https://www.bing.com/search?q=joe%20elvis%20alway&qs=n&form=QBRE&sp=-1&lq=0&pq=joe%20https://voyagestl.com/?post_type=interview&p=134753elvis%20alway&sc=12-15&sk=&cvid=20141FCD48F54824836390EB798188B0.
- Alba Ambert, novelist. In 1996 Ambert became the first Hispanic author to win the Carey McWilliams Award for Multicultural Literature, presented by the Multicultural Review, for her novel A Perfect Silence.
- Marta Aponte Alsina (born 1945), storyteller, novelist and literary critic
- Pedro I. Aponte Vázquez, historian, journalist, social scientist, professor and writer Author of ¡Yo Acuso! Tortura y Asesinato de Don Pedro Albizu Campos.; Pedro Albizu Campos: Su persecución por el F.B.I.; Crónica de un encubrimiento: Albizu Campos y el caso Rhoads.; Locura por decreto: El papel de Luis Muñoz Marín y José Trías Monge en el diagnóstico de locura de don Pedro Albizu Campos.; El ataque Nacionalista a La Fortaleza; The Unsolved Case of Dr. Cornelius P. Rhoads: An Indictment.; Transición [short stories]; La hacienda; "Necator Americanus: O sobre la fisiología del caso Rhoads"
- Delma S. Arrigoitia, historian, author. Arrigoitia was the first person at the University of Puerto Rico to earn a master's degree in the field of history. In 2010, her book, Puerto Rico Por Encima de Todo: Vida y Obra de Antonio R. Barcelo, 1868–1938, was recognized among the best in the category of "research and criticism" and awarded a first place prize by the Ateneo Puertorriqueño.
- Francisco Arriví, writer, poet, and playwright. Arriví is known as "The Father of the Puerto Rican Theater".
- Rane Arroyo, poet, playwright and scholar
- Yolanda Arroyo Pizarro (born 1970), award-winning Puerto Rican novelist, short story writer and essayist

== B–C ==
- Lefty (Manuel) Barreto, novelist, author of the autobiography Nobody's Hero (1977)
- Janette Becerra, short-story writer, poet, professor, literary critic, and lawyer. Author of Doce versiones de soledad, Elusiones, and Antrópolis.
- Emilio S. Belaval, short-story writer, playwright, essayist, and lawyer
- Pura Belpré, author. First Puerto Rican librarian in New York City.
- Samuel Beniquez, author of the autobiographical book entitled Tu alto precio... Mi gran valor.
- María Bibiana Benítez, playwright. Benitez is one of Puerto Rico's first woman poets.
- Alejandrina Benítez de Gautier, poet. Benítez de Gautier's collaboration with the "Aguinaldo Puertorriqueño" (Collection of Puerto Rican Poetry) gave her recognition as a great poet.
- Tomás Blanco, writer and historian. Blanco was the author of "Prontuario Historico de Puerto Rico" and "El Prejuicio Racial en Puerto Rico" (Racial Prejudice in Puerto Rico).
- Juan Boria, Afro-Caribbean poet. Boria, also known as the Negro Verse Pharaoh, was a poet known for his Afro-Caribbean poetry.
- Gerson Borrero, journalist, radio host and TV commentator in New York City. He has been editor-at-large of City & State NY and editor-in-chief of El Diario/La Prensa
- Giannina Braschi, author of postmodern political philosophy, poetry, fiction, and drama. Wrote the first full-length Spanglish novel. Titles: Yo-Yo Boing!, Empire of Dreams, and United States of Banana.
- Julia de Burgos, one of the greatest poets to have been born in Puerto Rico; author of "Yo misma fui mi ruta" and "Poema Río Grande de Loíza".
- German William Cabassa Barber, award-winning drama, science fiction and poetry writer.
- Pedro Cabiya, writer, poet and filmmaker. Author of the seminal Historias tremendas. Other books include Historias atroces, La cabeza, Malas hierbas, Trance, Crazy X-Ray Boomeranf Girl, Ánima Sola, Phantograms and Saga de Sandulce.
- Zenobia Camprubí, writer and poet. Camprubí was also the wife of Nobel Prize-winning author Juan Ramón Jiménez.
- Nemesio Canales, essayist and poet
- Luisa Capetillo, labor activist. Capetillo was one of Puerto Rico's most famous labor organizers. She was also a writer and an anarchist who fought for workers' and women's rights.
- Jaime Carrero, poet and playwright
- N. Humberto Cintrón, novelist, author of Frankie Christo (1972)
- Joaquín Colón (1896–1964), author of Pioneros puertorriqueños en Nueva York
- Manuel Corchado y Juarbe, poet, journalist and politician. Corchado y Juarbe defended the abolition of slavery and the establishment of a university in Puerto Rico.
- Juan Antonio Corretjer, poet. Corretjer was also a journalist and pro-independence political activist who opposed United States rule in Puerto Rico.
- Zoé Corretjer Lloréns
- Nicky Cruz, reverend. Cruz has written two autobiographies, Run Baby Run, with Jamie Buckingham (1968), and Soul Obsession, with Frank Martin (2005).
- Victor Hernández Cruz, poet and essayist. Random House published Cruz's first poetry collection, Snaps (1969), when he was nineteen.
- Isabel Cuchí Coll, journalist and author. Cuchi Coll was the granddaughter of Cayetano Coll y Toste and niece of José Coll y Cuchí. She served as Director of the "Sociedad de Autores Puertorriqueño"

== D ==
- Ánjelamaría Dávila, poet
- José Antonio Dávila, poet. Dávila was a well-known poet during Puerto Rico's postmodern era of poetry.
- Virgilio Dávila, poet. Dávila is considered by many to be one of Puerto Rico's greatest representatives of the modern literary era.
- Anjanette Delgado, novelist, author of The Heartbreak Pill and The Clairvoyant of Calle Ocho. Twice winner of the International Latino Book Award.
- Nelson Antonio Denis, novelist, journalist, New York State Assemblyman. Denis authored War Against All Puerto Ricans, published over 300 editorials as the editorial director of El Diario/La Prensa, and received the "Best Editorial Writing" award from the National Association of Hispanic Journalists.
- Abelardo Díaz Alfaro, writer
- Emilio Díaz Valcárcel
- Jaquira Díaz, writer, journalist
- José de Diego, "The Father of the Puerto Rican Independence Movement". De Diego was then elected to the House of Delegates, the only locally elected body of government allowed by the U.S., and which De Diego presided over from 1904 to 1917.
- Caridad de la Luz a.k.a. La Bruja, poet, playwright, actress and activist. She is also the writer/actor of Boogie Rican Blvd.

== E–G ==
- Elizam Escobar poet, author and visual artist.
- Sandra María Esteves, Nuyorican poet
- Héctor Feliciano, author. Feliciano's book The Lost Museum: The Nazi Conspiracy to Steal the World's Greatest Works of Art has shed a light on an estimated 20,000 looted works; each one is owned by a museum or a collector somewhere.
- Carole Fernández, novelist, author of Sleep of the Innocents (1991)
- Carlos Fonseca Suárez, novelist. author of Colonel Lágrimas (2016)
- Isabel Freire de Matos, writer, educator and advocate of Puerto Rican independence.
- Rosario Ferré, author of The House on the Lagoon, The Youngest Doll, and Maldito Amor.
- José Angel Figueroa, poet
- Shaggy Flores, Nuyorican writer and poet. African Diaspora Scholar, Founder of Voices for the Voiceless.
- Félix Franco-Oppenheimer, poet and writer. His works include Contornos, Imagen y visión edénica de Puerto Rico, and Antología poética.
- Edward Gallardo, playwright; works include those collected in Simpson Street and Other Plays
- Magali García Ramis, writer
- José Gautier Benítez, poet. Gautier Benítez is considered by many to be Puerto Rico's best poet of the Romantic Era.
- David Gonzalez, award-winning journalist and photographer at the New York Times.
- José Luis González, writer. One of the most prominent writers of the 20th century, particularly for his "El país de cuatro pisos" (1980).
- Migene González-Wippler, new-age author, prominent Santería expert.
- Manuel González Pató, educator and writer in the field of athletics

== H–K ==
- Victor Hernández Cruz, poet. In 1969, Hernández Cruz became the first Hispanic to be published by a mainstream publishing house when Random House published his poem "Snaps". In 1981, Life Magazine named him one of America's (US) greatest poets.
- Eugenio María de Hostos a.k.a. "El Ciudadano de las Américas" (The Citizen of the Americas), educator, philosopher, intellectual, lawyer, sociologist, and independence advocate.
- Quiara Alegría Hudes, playwright and author. She is best known for writing the book for the Tony Award-winning musical In the Heights.
- José de Jesús Esteves, poet, lawyer, and judge
- Zoé Jiménez Corretjer, poet, author
- José J. Iguina Goitia, Puerto Rican writer, poet, novelist, lecturer, short story teller

== L ==
- Lawrence La Fountain-Stokes, writer. Author of Uñas pintadas de azul/Blue Fingernails.
- Enrique A. Laguerre, writer. Laguerre was nominated for a Nobel Prize in literature.
- Eduardo Lalo (born 1960), writer. Author of Simone.
- Elidio La Torre-Lagares (born 1965), poet, novelist, essayist, author of Vicios de construcción (2008)
- Tato Laviera, poet. Author of AmeRícan.
- Georgina Lázaro, children's poet
- Aurora Levins Morales (born 1954), writer
- José Liboy Erba (Pepe Liboy) (born 1964)
- José María Lima (1934–2009), poet, philosopher, mathematician, author of La sílaba en la piel (1982)
- Luis Lloréns Torres, poet
- Washington Llorens, journalist, writer, linguist, and scholar
- Juan López Bauzá, writer, author of Barataria (2012)
- Luis López Nieves, writer
- Ángel Lozada, novelist
- Carmen Lugo Filippi (born 1940), short-story writer

== M–N ==
- Manuel Manrique, novelist, author of Island in Harlem (1966)
- Hugo Margenat, poet. Margenat was also the founder of the political youth pro-independence organizations "Acción Juventud Independentista" and "Federación de Universitarios Pro Independencia".
- René Marqués, playwright. Marqués wrote La Carreta (The Oxcart), which helped secure his reputation as a leading literary figure in Puerto Rico.
- Manuel Martínez Maldonado (born 1937), physician, poet, novelist, author of poetry books La voz sostenida and La novela del medio día and of the novel Isla Verde
- Antonio Martorell (born 1939), painter, graphic artist, writer and radio and television personality
- Nemir Matos-Cintrón, poet, novelist
- Francisco Matos Paoli, poet, critic, and essayist. Matos Paoli was nominated for the Nobel Prize in literature in 1977. He was also a Secretary General of the Puerto Rican Nationalist Party.
- Joserramón Melendes (born 1952), poet
- Concha Melendez, poet, writer
- Jesús Papoleto Meléndez, poet
- Manuel Méndez Ballester, writer
- Nancy Mercado, poet, playwright. Mercado is the author of "It Concerns the Madness," seven theatre plays, and a number of essays. Her work has been extensively anthologized.
- Luis Muñoz Marín, politician and poet
- Nicholasa Mohr, writer. Her works, including the novel Nilda, tell of growing up in the Puerto Rican communities of the Bronx and El Barrio and of the difficulties Puerto Rican women face in the United States.
- Rosario Morales, poet, co-author of Getting Home Alive (1986)
- Richie Narvaez, short story writer and novelist, author of Hipster Death Rattle (2019) and Noiryorican (2020)
- Luis Negrón, short-story writer. His book Mundo Cruel won the Lambda Literary Award for Gay Fiction at the 26th Lambda Literary Awards in 2014.
- Mercedes Negrón Muñoz, a.k.a. "Clara Lair", poet. Negrón Muñoz was an influential poet whose work dealt with the everyday struggles of the common Puerto Rican.
- Urayoán Noel, poet

== O ==
- Judith Ortiz Cofer, poet, writer and essayist
- Micol Ostow, author. Ostow wrote Mind Your Manners, Dick and Jane. Her novel Emily Goldberg Learns to Salsa was named a New York Public Library Book for the Teen Age.

== P–Q ==
- José Gualberto Padilla a.k.a. "El Caribe", poet
- Luis Palés Matos, poet of Afro-Caribbean themes; author of Tuntún de pasa y grifería and Pueblo negro.
- Benito Pastoriza Iyodo, writer
- Antonio S. Pedreira, writer and educator. Pedreira's most important book was Insularismo, in which he explores the meaning of being Puerto Rican.
- Pedro Pietri, poet, playwright. Co-founder of the Nuyorican Movement; author of Puerto Rican Obituary and The Masses Are Asses.
- Miguel Piñero, playwright, writer. Co-founder of the Nuyorican Poets Cafe.
- Juan Ponce de León II, first Puerto Rican acting governor. His written work Memorias de Melgarejo (Melgarejo's Memoirs) is one of Puerto Rico's most important historical documents.
- Juan Carlos Quiñones (born 1972), writer
- Ernesto Quiñonez, novelist, author of Bodega Dreams, Chango's Fire, and Taina.

== R–S ==
- Manuel Ramos Otero, short story writer, poet and essayist; author of Página en blanco y staccato.
- Evaristo Ribera Chevremont, poet
- Marie Teresa Ríos, author. Author of the novel The Fifteenth Pelican, which was the basis for the popular 1960s television sitcom, The Flying Nun.
- Edward Rivera, novelist, author of Family Installments: Memories of Growing Up Hispanic (1983)
- José Rivera, playwright. Rivera is the first Puerto Rican screenwriter to be nominated for an Oscar.
- Oswaldo Rivera, novelist, author of Fire and Rain (1990)
- Jorge Rivera Herrans, singer, songwriter of EPIC: THE ITHACA SAGA. Based on the Odyssey by Homer.
- Abraham Rodríguez Jr., short story author; works include Ashes to Ashes (1989), Boy Without a Flag, Spidertown, The Buddha Book, South by South Bronx
- Leonardo Rodríguez, short story author; works include They Have to Be Puerto Ricans (1988)
- Lola Rodríguez de Tió, poet. Rodríguez de Tió wrote lyrics to the revolutionary "La Borinqueña".
- Edgardo Rodríguez Juliá, novelist, author of The Renuciation and Cortijo's Wake
- Bonafide Rojas, poet, musician, author of Pelo Bueno (2004), When the City Sleeps (2012), Renovatio (2014), Notes On The Return To The Island (2017), & Excelsior (2024)
- Francisco Rojas Tollinchi, poet, civic leader and journalist.
- Efe Rosario, poet. Author of El tiempo ha sido terrible con nosotros (2020), También mueren los lugares donde fuimos felices (2020) & Mermar (2023)
- Richard Ruíz, novelist, author of The Hungry American (1978)
- Roque Salas Rivera (born 1985), poet
- Luis Rafael Sánchez, playwright, novelist
- Joe Sánchez, former New York City police officer. Sánchez was a "highly decorated former New York City police officer and author whose books give an insight as to the corruption within the department."
- Edgardo Sanabria Santaliz, short story author
- Esmeralda Santiago, author of the coming of age memoir When I Was Puerto Rican
- Ruben Santiago-Hudson, playwright and actor. Santiago-Hudson has won national awards for his work in both areas.
- Mayra Santos-Febres, poet, novelist
- Iván Segarra Báez, novelist, poet, author of Ante la luz de un amor prohibido and director of Revista Literaria de Puerto Rico.
- Pedro Juan Soto, writer/novelist. Soto is the father of slain independence activist Carlos Soto Arriví.
- Clemente Soto Vélez, poet and activist
- Clementina Souchet, novelist, author of Clementina: Historia sin fin (1986)

== T–Z ==
- Alejandro Tapia y Rivera, writer and poet. "The Father of Puerto Rican Literature".
- Piri Thomas, author of the best-seller Down These Mean Streets.
- Luisita Lopez Torregrosa, journalist and author
- Edwin Torres, "Nuyorican Movement" poet
- Judge Edwin Torres, writer. New York Supreme Court Justice who wrote Carlito's Way.
- J. L. Torres (born 1954), writer and poet
- Justin Torres (born 1980), writer
- Diego de Torres Vargas a priest who was the first person to write a book about the history of Puerto Rico.
- Luz María Umpierre, poet, scholar
- Charlie Vázquez, novelist
- Lourdes Vázquez, poet, short story writer, novelist
- Robert Vazquez-Pacheco, author
- Ana Lydia Vega, short story author, essayist
- Bernardo Vega, novelist, author of The Memoirs of Bernardo Vega (1977, English ed. 1984)
- Edgardo Vega Yunqué or Ed Vega, novelist
- Irene Vilar, author and literary agent. Vilar is the granddaughter of independence activist Lolita Lebrón.
- Alfredo Villanueva Collado, poet
- William Carlos Williams (Puerto Rican mother), Modernist poet
- Emanuel Xavier (Puerto Rican father), poet and novelist
- Iris M. Zavala (1936–2020), author, scholar, poet
- Manuel Zeno Gandía, writer. Zeno Gandía wrote La Charca, a notable late nineteenth-century Puerto Rican novel.

== See also ==
- Before Columbus Foundation
- History of women in Puerto Rico
- List of Latin American writers
- List of Puerto Ricans
- Multi-ethnic literature of the United States
- Puerto Rican literature
- Media of Puerto Rico
