= Emilio Díaz Valcárcel =

Puerto Rican fiction writer (born 1929)

- Born: October 16, 1929; Trujillo Alto, Puerto Rico
- Died: February 2, 2015 (aged 85); Trujillo Alto, Puerto Rico
- Occupation: Author
- Writing career
- Notable works: Schemes in the Month of March; Hot Soles in Harlem
- Website: www.emiliodiazvalcarcel.com

Emilio Díaz Valcárcel (October 16, 1929 – February 2, 2015) was an acclaimed Puerto Rican writer who won several awards. He addresses numerous social issues in his novels, short stories, and plays.

== Biography ==
Díaz Valcárcel was born in Trujillo Alto, Puerto Rico. At the age of twenty he was recruited by the United States Army and sent to the Korean War, an experience that would leave a mark on a large part of his work. He later worked as a film screenwriter in the Puerto Rican Division of Community Education and as a copywriter. He directed the cultural magazine Cupey and served as Professor of Language and Literature at the University of Puerto Rico, from where he retired in 1995. He founded the Narrative Workshop of the Institute of Puerto Rican Culture and the Department of Spanish of the Faculty of General Studies from the University of Puerto Rico.

== Literary works ==
Díaz Valcárcel is part of a group of Puerto Rican writers that emerged with great force in the mid-twentieth century and that includes figures such as José Luis González, Pedro Juan Soto and René Marqués. His literary work has been the subject of studies and doctoral theses by university students inside and outside of Puerto Rico, as well as part of his work has been translated into different languages. He received multiple tributes and recognitions by different universities and cultural organizations both in Puerto Rico and abroad. His literary work has been awarded by institutions such as the Ateneo Puertorriqueño, PEN Club de Puerto Rico, Institute of Puerto Rican Literature, and the 2002 National Prize for the Arts awarded by the Institute of Puerto Rican Culture for a life dedicated to cultural endeavors. He has several books of short stories and among his novels the following stand out: Figuraciones en el mes de marzo, finalist for the 1971 Seix Barral Brief Library Award, which entered Puerto Rico in the "boom" of Spanish-American literature; Hot Soles in Harlem; My Mom Loves Me; The Man who Worked on Monday; and Laguna y Asociados.

== Publications ==
=== Fiction ===
- El asedio y otros cuentos. Mexico City: Ediciones Arrecife, 1958.
- Proceso en diciembre. Madrid: Ediciones Taurus, 1963.
- El hombre que trabajó lunes. Mexico City: Era, 1966.
- Figuraciones en el mes de marzo. Barcelona: Seix Barral, 1972.
- Harlem todos los días. Rio Piedras: Ediciones Huracán, 1978.
- Mi mamá me ama. Barcelona: Seix Barral, 1981.
- Taller de invenciones. Rio Piedras, Puerto Rico: Editorial Cultural, 1993.
- Laguna y asociados. San Juan, Puerto Rico: Editorial Plaza Mayor, 1999.
- Cuentos completos. Editorial Alfaguara, 2002.
- El dulce fruto. Guaynabo, P.R.: Alfaguara, 2007.
- El tiempo airado. San Juan, Puerto Rico: Editorial Isla Negra, 2014.

=== Non-fiction ===
- La visión del mundo en la novela: Tiempo de silencio, de Luis Martín-Santos. Río Piedras: Editorial de la Universidad de Puerto Rico, 1982.

=== Translations ===
- Hot Soles in Harlem. (Translation of Harlem todos los días by Tanya T. Fayen.) Pittsburgh: Latin American Literary Review Press, 1993. ISBN 0935480617
- Schemes in the Month of March. (Translation of Figuraciones en el mes de marzo by Nancy A. Sebastiani.) New York: Bilingual Press/Editorial Bilingüe, 1979. ISBN 9780916950064

== Awards and honors ==
- 2002 National Prize for the Arts awarded by the Institute of Puerto Rican Culture.

== See also ==
- List of Puerto Ricans
- List of Puerto Rican writers
- Puerto Rican literature
