= Antonio Martorell =

Puerto Rican artist and writer

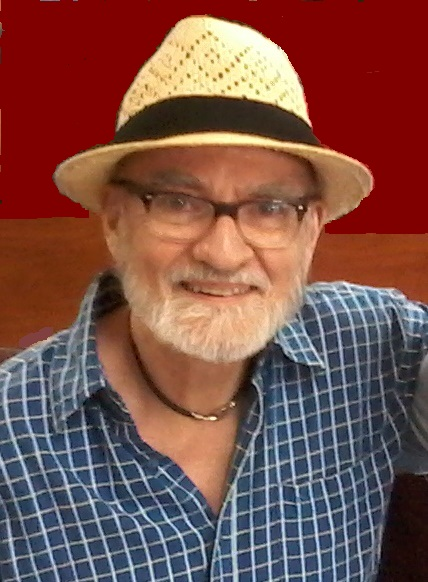
- Antonio Martorell in Ponce, Puerto Rico (January 2015)
- Born: Antonio Martorell Cardona; 18 April 1939 (age 86); Santurce, Puerto Rico
- Education: Madrid, Spain
- Known for: Painting, writer, educator, broadcaster
- Notable work: Painter: ‘Escarabajo’ [Beetle] ‘Espejuelos’ [Eyeglasses] Writer: La Piel de la Memoria; El Libro Dibujado
- Awards: Bienal de Arte de San Juan, National Medal of Arts
- Patrons: Museo de Arte de Ponce; Puerto Rico Museum of Contemporary Art; Puerto Rico Museum of Art
- Website: http://www.antoniomartorell.com

Antonio ("Toño") Martorell Cardona (born 18 April 1939) is a Puerto Rican painter, graphic artist and writer. He regularly exhibits in Puerto Rico and the United States and participates in arts events around the world. He spends his time between his workshops in Ponce, Hato Rey, and New York City, his presentations worldwide and his academic work in Cayey, Puerto Rico.

== Early years ==
Martorell Cardona was born on 18 April 1939, in Santurce, Puerto Rico. He is the son of Antonio Martorell II and Luisa Cardona. His father left the family when Martorell was ten years old. He is the first of three children. He first started showing interest in arts as a small child with drawings.

== Schooling ==
He studied diplomacy at Georgetown University in Washington, D.C., and then in 1961 went to study painting with Julio Martín Caro in Madrid. In the 1960s, he worked in Ponce, collaborating with Sor Isolina Ferre in the creation of community art workshops. He also worked at the workshop of Lorenzo Homar at the Instituto de Cultura Puertorriqueña between 1962 and 1965. He currently is the Resident Artist of the University of Puerto Rico at Cayey.

== Career ==
Martorell's incursion into the arts came by the way of theater on 25 April 2001. He participated in the scenography of "Celebración Verdiana " for the opera by Plácido Domingo.

=== Painting ===
Martorell currently has a workshop in New York City and another one on Calle Salmon (old Calle Comercio) in barrio Playa, Ponce, at a building that dates to 1815 and which he has occupied since 2007. Of his breezy workshop at Playa de Ponce and his spiritual connection there he has said "more than Ponceño, I am a Playero...My north now is the South and its wide horizons."

Martorell was the winner of the Bienal de Arte de San Juan, and has illustrated books of several authors including Alma Rosa Flor, Heraclio Cepeda, Nicholasa Mohr, and Pura Belpré. He also illustrated the ABC de Puerto Rico published by Troutman Press.

=== Writing ===
In the 1980s, Martorell dedicated himself to writing, producing various books. As a writer, Martorell has written books such as La piel de la memoria (translated as Memory's Tattoo by Andrew Hurley), and El libro dibujado (The Drawn Book). He currently writes a column for Escenario, a section of Puerto Rican newspaper El Vocero.

== Awards ==
On 21 March 2023, Martorell was awarded the National Medal of Arts by the president of the United States, Joe Biden.

== Personal life ==
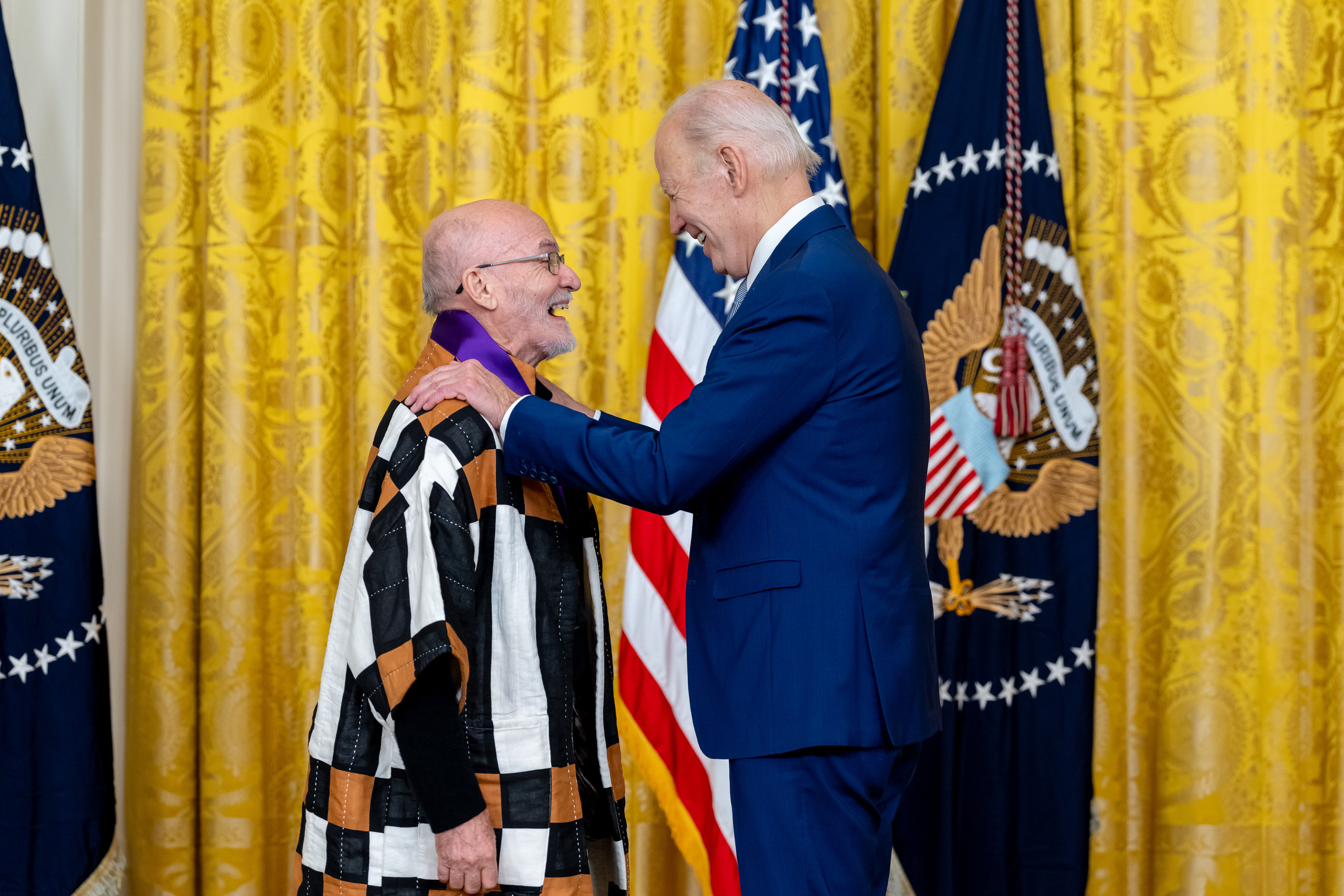
President Biden presents the 2021 National Medal of the Arts to Antonio Martorell Cardona on 21 March 2023 at the White House

In December 2006, Martorell's workshop in Cayey, Puerto Rico, was subjected to arson with the loss of many works of art.

== Works ==
The most extensive publication on Martorell's work is Antonio Díaz-Royo's biography Martorell: la aventura de la creación (The Adventure of Creation). His paintings are found at the Instituto de Cultura Puertorriqueña, Museo de la Universidad de Puerto Rico, Museo de Arte de Ponce, Museo de Arte de Puerto Rico, Galería Nacional de San Salvador, Museo de Arte Moderno de México, Museo del Barrio, Whitney Museum and Hotel Melia in Ponce, Puerto Rico.

Matorell's works have been reviewed by numerous critics. One, Nelson Rivera Rosario, analyzed three works by Martorell: Catálogo de objetos [Catalogue of Objects] (1974); White Christmas (1980); and Simplicity Patterns (1981). In his interpretation, Rivera Rosario believes the three works represent Martorell's attempt to provide the Puerto Rican viewer with "the means to see and evaluate their colonial status” so that, hopefully, they might lead to “eventual decolonization.”

== Publications ==
- La piel de la memoria. [Puerto Rico]: Ediciones Envergadura, 1991.
- El libro dibujado: el dibujo librado. Cayey [P.R.]; New York: Ediciones Envergadura, 1995.
- Memory’s Tattoo. Translation of La piel de la memoria from the Spanish by Andrew Hurley; foreword by Luis Rafael Sánchez. San Juan, P.R.: Editorial Plaza Mayor, 2005. ISBN 1-56328-239-9.

== See also ==
- List of Puerto Rican writers
- List of Puerto Ricans
- Puerto Rican literature
