= Manuel A. Alonso Pacheco =

Puerto Rican writer and physician (1822–1889)

Manuel Antonio Alonso
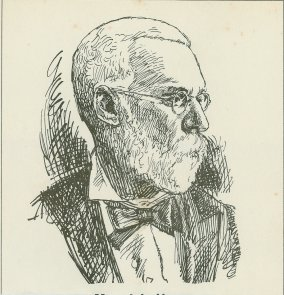
- Dr. Manuel A. Alonso
- Born: October 6, 1822; San Juan, Puerto Rico, Spanish Empire
- Died: November 4, 1889 (aged 67); San Juan, Puerto Rico
- Education: University of Barcelona (MD)
- Occupations: writer, poet, journalist, physician
- Writing career
- Notable works: El Gíbaro, Album Puertorriqueño
- Movements: Liberal reform movement, costumbrismo

Dr. Manuel Antonio Alonso Pacheco (October 6, 1822 – November 4, 1889) was a Puerto Rican writer, poet, journalist and medical doctor. He is considered to be the first Puerto Rican writer of notable importance.

== Early years ==
Alonso was born in San Juan, Puerto Rico. His father Juan Francisco Alonso was a Galician soldier and his mother María de África de Pacheco was a native of Ceuta of Spanish origin. He received his primary education in Caguas and in the Ildefonso Seminary in San Juan. Alonso then went to the City of Barcelona, Spain where he enrolled in the University of Barcelona to study medicine. He finished his medical studies in 1844 and practiced his profession in Barcelona.

== Works ==
In 1845, he published a book called "El Gíbaro" ("The Jíbaro"). "El Gíbaro" was a collection of verses whose main themes were the humble Puerto Rican subsistence farmer and the customs of Puerto Rico.

== Return to Puerto Rico ==
In 1848, Alonso returned to Puerto Rico and set up his medical office in the City of Caguas. He also became the director of the House of Benefit of San Juan, until the day of his death. In collaboration with other notable writers of the day, he published the "Album Puertorriqueño" (Puerto Rican Album), which was the second anthology of poems to be published in the island. Alonso died in the City of San Juan on November 4, 1889. He was buried at Santa María Magdalena de Pazzis Cemetery in San Juan.

== Poet and journalist ==
As a writer, poet and journalist he derived his inspiration from anything that had to do with love and his country. Alonso cultivated his verses and gave them a touch festivality. Alonso was also a member of the Liberal Reform movement in Puerto Rico and directed that organizations publication, El Agente (The Agent).

Among his poems are:

- "El Capitan Correa.", about Antonio de los Reyes Correa
- Al Sr. D. José Julián Acosta
- ¿Deseas, querido Pepe...
- Boceto
- Color moreno, frente despejada
- Debajo de una palmera
- El puertorriqueño
- El salvaje
- Es Madrid la villa y corte
- Seguidillas
- Todo el mundo es Popayán
- Verás qué seguidillas

== Short stories ==
Some of the short stories Alonso wrote include:

- Agapito Avellaneda
- El jíbaro en la capital
- El pájaro malo
- El sueño de mi compadre
- La gallera
- La linterna mágica
- La negrita y la vaquita
- Perico Paciencia

Puerto Rico has honored his memory by naming schools and public buildings after him.

== See also ==
- List of Puerto Ricans
- List of Puerto Rican writers
- Puerto Rican literature
- Multi-Ethnic Literature of the United States
