= Delma S. Arrigoitia =

Puerto Rican historian

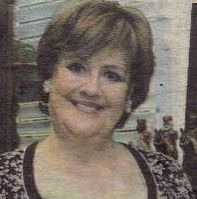
- Delma S. Arrigoitia
- Born: Delma S. Arrigoitia Peraza; February 10, 1945; Arecibo, Puerto Rico
- Died: January 8, 2023 (aged 77); San Juan, Puerto Rico
- Occupations: Historian, author, educator and lawyer
- Children: Denise Fernandez, Melissa Fernandez, Ivan Fernandez, Jose Fernandez
- Writing career
- Genre: History
- Notable works: "Jose De Diego el legislador" "Eduardo Giorgetti Y Su Mundo: La Aparente Paradoja De Un Millonario Genio Empresarial Y Su Noble Humanismo" "Puerto Rico Por Encima de Todo: Vida y Obra de Antonio R. Barcelo, 1868–1938" "Introduccion a la Historia de la Moda en Puerto Rico"
- Notable awards: "Puerto Rico Por Encima de Todo: Vida y Obra de Antonio R. Barcelo, 1868-1938" - First prize for research and criticism by the Ateneo Puertorriqueño

Delma S. Arrigoitia (February 10, 1945 – January 8, 2023) was a historian, author, educator, and lawyer whose written works covered the life and works of some of Puerto Rico's most prominent politicians of the early 20th century. After earning her doctorate in history at Fordham University in New York, she helped develop the graduate school for history at the University of Puerto Rico and taught there for many years.

== Early years ==
Arrigoitia (birth name: Delma S. Arrigoitia Peraza) was born in the city of Arecibo to Enrique and Consuelo Arrigoitia. Her father had two sons from his first marriage, but Delma grew up mostly as an only child. She greatly enjoyed reading books. One of her brothers became a medical doctor, and the other obtained a doctorate in literature.

She came from a distinguished family whose love for education and culture served as her inspiration. She received her primary education at the Colegio San Felipe de Arecibo and her secondary education at the University High School of the University of Puerto Rico (UPR) in Rio Piedras. Arrigoitia earned a Bachelor of Arts degree in history from the UPR, where she was also a magna cum laude student, with the highest GPA in her academic concentration.

Arrigoitia continued her studies to earn a master's degree in history. Her thesis was La Diputación Provincial de Puerto Rico, 1820–23.

For a short period of time, Arrigoitia taught humanities in the University of Puerto Rico before she proceeded to study law, earning her Juris Doctor degree. She practiced with the law firm of Hartzell, Ydrach, Mellado, Santiago before deciding to attend Fordham University in New York City to pursue a doctorate degree in history. There she earned her degree with a thesis on José de Diego. It was later published by the Institute of Puerto Rican Culture, titled José de Diego, el Legislador.

In this book, and in her later biographies, Arrigoitia drew on her legal experience to analyze and understand the laws created by the subjects of her political biographies, and their influence on the economic and political status of Puerto Rico in relation to the United States.

== Academic career ==
Arrigoitia returned to the UPR and helped establish, as coordinator, the institution's first graduate school of history, which offered a doctorate degree in history. She wrote the biography of Eduardo Giorgetti, a Puerto Rican millionaire who was another prominent political figure, titled Eduardo Giorgetti y su mundo: La aparente paradoja de un millonario genio empresarial y su noble humanismo. During her years at the university, she wrote a rules and regulations manual for university professors. The Middle States Association (MSA) now requires compliance with this manual, as a prerequisite for UPR's accreditation by the MSA.

As a university professor, Arrigoitia also traveled throughout Puerto Rico, giving conferences on De Diego and Giorgetti.

In the late 1990s, Arrigoitia became interested in writing a book about Antonio Rafael Barceló, first president of the Puerto Rican Senate. The Senate offered her support during her research phase for Puerto Rico Por Encima de Todo: Vida y Obra de Antonio R. Barcelo, 1868–1938. The book was recognized by the Fundación Luis Muñoz Marín. In 2010, it was also noted as the year's best book in research and criticism by the Ateneo Puertorriqueño (Puerto Rican Athenaeum). Arrigoitia was awarded the "Premio Nacional del Instituto de Literatura" (National Award of the Literature Institute). It is the highest honor bestowed upon an author in Puerto Rico. The book won a first prize of $6,000, presented to Arrigoitia in a ceremony in July 2010.

== 2002 to 2023 ==
After retiring in 2002 from the university, Arrigoitia concentrated on writing books. In 2012, she published her book Introduccion a la Historia de la Moda en Puerto Rico. The book, which was requested by the high fashion designer Carlota Alfaro, covers over 500 years of history of the fashion industry in Puerto Rico. Arrigoitia also worked on a book about the women who have served in the Puerto Rican Legislature, as requested by the former President of the Chamber of Representatives, Jennifer Gonzalez. Arrigoitia also planned a book about the First Chamber of Delegates (1900–1903) of Puerto Rico.

Arrigoitia was featured in the section Escenarios – Literatura in El Vocero, a local newspaper, and in a piece titled Los Tres Hombres de Delma (The Three Men of Delma) on March 27, 2010. On April 5, she was also featured in the section Vidas Unicas in El Nuevo Dia, another local newspaper, and in a piece titled Exploradora del Genio Patrio (Explorer of the Patriotic Genre). Arrigoitia resided in Ocean Park, Santurce, San Juan, Puerto Rico.

Arrigoitia died on January 8, 2023.

== Written works ==
- José de Diego, el legislador: su visión de Puerto Rico en la historia (1903-1918). San Juan: Instituto de Cultura Puertorriqueña, 1991.
- Eduardo Giorgetti y su mundo: La aparente paradoja de un millonario genio empresarial y su noble humanismo. San Juan: Ediciones Puerto, 2002. ISBN 0-942347-52-8; ISBN 978-0-942347-52-4
- Puerto Rico por encima de todo: Vida y obra de Antonio R. Barcelo, 1868–1938. San Juan: Ediciones Puerto, 2008. ISBN 978-1-934461-69-3
- Introducción a la Historia de la Moda en Puerto Rico. Editorial Plaza Mayor, 2012. ISBN 156328376X; ISBN 978-1563283765

== See also ==
- List of Latin American writers
- List of Puerto Rican writers
- List of Puerto Ricans
- Puerto Rican literature
- Multi-Ethnic Literature of the United States
- History of women in Puerto Rico
