= Nicholasa Mohr =

American writer of Puerto Rican descent

- Born: November 1, 1938 (age 87); Manhattan, New York, U.S.
- Writing career
- Notable works: Nilda; Rituals of Survival: A Woman’s Portfolio
- Notable awards: 1974 Jane Addams Children’s Book Award; The New York Times Outstanding Book of the Year; National Book Award finalist

Nicholasa Mohr (born November 1, 1938) is one of the best known Nuyorican writers, born in the United States to Puerto Rican parents. In 1973, she became the first Nuyorican woman in the 20th century to have her literary works published by the major commercial publishing houses, and has had the longest creative writing career of any Nuyorican female writer for these publishing houses. She centers her works on the female experience as a child and adult in Puerto Rican communities in New York City, with much of writing containing semi-autobiographical content. In addition to her prominent novels and short stories, she has written screenplays, plays, and television scripts.

== Life and career ==
Mohr was born in 1930 to Puerto Rican immigrant parents during the tail end of the Great Depression. She was raised in East Harlem at a time when the neighborhood was transforming from the Italian enclave it has been earlier in the century to the Puerto Rican and African-American neighborhood it would be during Mohr's childhood. During Mohr's early childhood, East Harlem included high concentration of retail and thrift stores and a collection of expensive homes and lower income housing, including the East River Housing Project. Mohr lived in a four-bedroom apartment with eleven members of her family and extended family.

Mohr grew up in a bilingual household where she used Spanish with her parents and English with her siblings. She came to understand Spanish as a private language of her Puerto Rican heritage and English as a language of survival in the public sphere. Much of the writing she would do throughout her life would be in English.

Her father died when she was eight years old, leaving her mother with seven children, and Mohr as the only female and the youngest amongst her siblings. In order to escape the poverty that surrounded her, Mohr used her imagination to express her feelings. Her artistic talents and eagerness for learning flourished when she was a young student, but weren't always appreciated by her teachers, who saw her Puerto Rican heritage as a weakness. Since Mohr's parents saw her schooling in America as a privilege, Mohr learned to adapt to her surroundings, while spending her free time volunteering in the library and reading, learning what she wasn't able to attain in school. After graduating junior high school, she got a job as a page girl in the New York Public Library.

Mohr studied fashion illustration in high school and graduated in 1953, then went to study at the Art Students League, an art school located in New York. Here she discovered the works of Diego Rivera and José Clemente Orozco which inspired her to study art and travel to Mexico City to study at the Taller de Gráficos for a semester. After a year she returned to the United States and attended the New School for Social Research. Then in 1959 she went to Brooklyn Museum of Art School and Pratt Graphics Center. Throughout her studies Mohr was drawn to artwork because of its powerful message about social change.

Mohr had a successful career in graphic design and the fine arts, until she shifted to fiction writing in the early 1970s. She got her start in writing after a suggestion from her art agent. She ended up writing a 50-page piece, and although that agent turned down the piece for its lack of sex and violence, the piece would end up being accepted by the editor at Harper & Row publishing house. Mohr went on to turn that 50-page piece into her first novel, Nilda, which would kickstart her writing career.

From 1988 through 1991, she taught writing as a distinguished visiting professor at Queens College, City University of New York. From 1994 through 1995, she was writer-in-residence at Richmond College, the American University in London.

Mohr has written fifteen books total, not including reprinted or translated versions. Her most recent books are 1997's “A Matter of Pride and Other Stories,” published by Arte Público Press and Untitled Nicholasa Mohr in 1998.

== Major works ==
=== Nilda ===
Mohr published her first book Nilda in 1973, which traces the life of a teenage Puerto Rican girl who confronts prejudices during the World War II era in New York. The work is semi-autobiographical, drawing inspiration from her childhood, but includes as much fiction as it does reality.

One of the most prominent themes in the book is the assertion of place and identity for a woman in colonized community. Nilda must deal with intersecting ethnic and gender prejudice and is constantly pushed towards assimilation. As Nilda grows up, she is mocked for her Puerto Rican accent by her teacher and classmate and is taught by her brothers to be quiet and know her place. Similarly to Mohr herself, Nilda overcomes this stifling of her self-expression by turning to art. The value of art as a sanctuary is a recurring theme throughout the book. Nilda's story culminates much the way Mohr's own childhood did, with the death of her mother. On her deathbed, Nilda's mother encourages her to find agency in her own life as a woman, telling her to hold onto her education and the self-expression she finds through art.

Drawing on her training and expertise in art, Mohr created the book jacket and eight illustrations for the book.

Though she has not been as active publishing in the last twenty years, her books are still highly regarded. She was awarded the Jane Addams Children's Book Award. In a 2016 interview with The New York Times, Hamilton creator Lin-Manuel Miranda cited Nilda as the book that shaped him the most.

=== El Bronx Remembered ===
Mohr's second book, El Bronx Remembered, was published in 1975 by Harper & Row. It is a collection of stories and a novella about the experiences of Puerto Ricans living in New York. The stories center on the era of the Great Migration of Puerto Ricans to New York with the stories taking place from the late 1940s through the mid 1950. In is this collection of works, Mohr writes poignantly about the immigrant experience of being "strangers in their own country" for Puerto Ricans who have been U.S. citizens all of their life, yet still feel like immigrants.

In "The Wrong Lunch Line" Mohr tells the story of an interethnic childhood friendship between a Puerto Rican girl (Yvette) and a Jewish girl (Mildred) in a diverse New York public school. When Yvette tries to eat with Mildred and the Jewish kids for a free Passover lunch at school, she gets yelled at by the teachers for being in the wrong lunch line. The girls, not fully understanding the ethnic tensions at play in the adults reactions, end up just laughing off the awkward experience. Mohr's vivid writing about young characters while conveying deeper themes has made it well suited to being widely used in grade-school curricula.

In the novella "Herman and Alice" Mohr describes the transition from the small town gossip and constraints in Puerto Rico to the much more anonymous experience of living in New York City.

El Bronx Remembered was awarded the New Times Outstanding Book Award, making Mohr the first Latina woman to receive such an honor.

==== Stories ====
- A Very Special Pet
- A New Window Display
- "Tell the Truth..."
- Shoes for Hector
- "Once upon a Time..."
- Mr. Mendelsohn
- The Wrong Lunch Line
- A Lesson in Fortune-Telling
- Uncle Claudio
- Princess
- Herman and Alice
- Love with Aleluya

=== Rituals of Survival: a Woman's Portfolio ===
Rituals of Survival is a collection of six of Mohr's short stories originally published in 1985. Each story features a different Puerto Rican American woman, describing their personal conflicts and their interpersonal relationships. The works are set in the era following the Great Migration of Puerto Ricans to New York and focuses on a period of economic hardship, racism, and sexism. Particularly, the works focus on the women's self-reliance and self-liberation in the context of oppression of women within their own Puerto Rican communities.

In "Aunt Rosana's Rocker," Mohr depicts a story of female sexual liberation within marriage. The plot revolves around a wife Zoraida pleasuring herself each night in her Aunt Rosana's rocking chair and a husband Casto who disapproves. Casto brings this marital conflict to a discussion with their extended families and the families decide to confiscate the chair, much to Zoraida's sadness. This story emphasizes themes of learning the multiple paths to female sexual liberation within an oppressive environment.

==== Stories ====
- Aunt Rosana's Rocker (Zoraida)
- A Time with a Future (Carmela)
- Brief Miracle (Virginia)
- A Thanksgiving Celebration (Amy)
- Happy Birthday (Lucia)
- The Artist (Inez)

=== The Song of El Coquí and Other Tales of Puerto Rico ===
Mohr's 1995 children's book The Song of el Coquí and Other Tales of Puerto Rico (written and published in both English and Spanish) discusses the ancestral traditions that make up Puerto Rican culture, and mixes the heritages of Latin Americans, Africans, Spaniards, as well as indigenous people. Mohr uses animals to illustrate the mixing and blending of cultures frequent in Latin America.

== Creative Influences ==
Mohr is predominantly influenced by Puerto Rican culture and the migratory patterns of Puerto Ricans within the United States. She has refers to herself as "a daughter of the Puerto Rican Diaspora." Much of her work is influenced by the geographic distance between Puerto Rican New Yorkers and the Puerto Rican Island, which creates an "island mythology" for those so far from the real island. The concept of "island mythology" and its relationship with colonialism and a community in exile are steady themes throughout many of her works.

In Mohr's own memoir, she recalls living in an all-white neighborhood with her family as a child. Her brothers got brutally beaten and she was afraid to leave her house. Due to this, the family moved after four months to another part of the Bronx. These incidents of brutality and fear are what inspired her young adult book Felita.

Feeling like an outcast is a common theme in Mohr's stories, and is also paralleled through her own life experiences. In Mohr's memoir, she recalls times where her bilingualism got her in trouble in school. In Nilda, a similar situation occurs where a character finds her knuckles smacked by a teacher when she speaks Spanish. In addition, when Mohr discussed her faith with nuns growing up, she was told that her religious practice was "sinful." Being forced to assimilate to a new culture is a reoccurring issue in Mohr's books, and her characters use their voices to overcome stereotypes as Mohr did in her life.

By exploring the lives and traditions of Latin Americans, Mohr encourages readers of all ages and ethnicities to widen their perceptions of Latinos.

== Personal life ==
Mohr met her husband Irwin when she attended the New School for Social Research. They were married from 1957 until his death in 1980. They have two sons, David and Jason.

She was a resident of Teaneck, New Jersey starting in the early 1970s.

== Works ==
- Nilda: a novel. Arte Publico Press. 1986. ISBN 978-0-934770-61-3. (First published 1974.)
- Bronx Remembered: A Novella and Stories. San Val, Incorporated. 1993. ISBN 978-0-613-18443-4.
- El Bronx remembered: a novella and stories. Harper & Row. 1975.
- In Nueva York. Arte Publico Press. 1988. ISBN 978-0-934770-78-1.
- Felita. Illustrator Ray Cruz. Bantam. 1990. ISBN 978-0-553-15792-5.
- Going home. Dial Books for Young Readers. 1986. ISBN 978-0-8037-0269-1.
- Rituals of survival: a woman's portfolio. Arte Publico Press. 1985. ISBN 978-0-934770-39-2.
- Growing up inside the sanctuary of my imagination. J. Messner. 1994. ISBN 978-0-671-74171-6.
- A Matter of pride and other stories. Arte Público Press. 1997. ISBN 978-1-55885-177-1. "Nicholasa Mohr."
- The song of el coquí and other tales of Puerto Rico. Illustrator Antonio Martorell. Viking. 1995. ISBN 978-0-670-85837-8.
- La canción del coquí y otros cuentos de Puerto Rico. Viking. 1995. ISBN 978-0-670-86296-2.
- The magic shell. Illustrator Rudy Gutierrez. Scholastic. 1995. ISBN 978-0-590-47110-7.
- El regalo mágico. Translated by Osvaldo Blanco. Illustrator Rudy Gutierrez. Scholastic. 1996. ISBN 978-0-590-50210-8.
- Old Letivia and the Mountain of Sorrows. Illustrator Rudy Gutierrez. Viking. 1996. ISBN 978-0-670-84419-7.
- La vieja Letivia y el Monte de los Pesares. Illustrator Rudy Gutierrez. Penguin Ediciones/Viking. 1996. ISBN 978-0-670-86324-2.
- I NEVER EVEN SEEN MY FATHER (play)

== Awards ==
- Raul Julia Award by the Puerto Rican Family Institute (June 2007)
- Governor George E. Pataki's New York State Hispanic Heritage Month Award (2006)
- Women of El Barrio, Woman of Substance Award (2003)
- Hispanic Heritage Award for Literature (1997)
- Honoree for Dedication to Puerto Rican Heritage by the Puerto Rican Heritage Committee, District 32 in Bushwick, Brooklyn (1998)
- Lifetime Achievement Award from the National Congress of Puerto Rican Women in Philadelphia (1996)
- Honorary Degree of Doctor of Letters from the State University of New York, Albany Campus (1989)
- American Book Award (1981)
- Jane Addams Children's Book Awards (1974)
- The New York Times Outstanding Book of the Year
- National Book Award finalist (1976)

== Critical studies ==
(as of March 2008)

1. Nilda de Nicholasa Mohr, El bildungsroman y la aparición de un espacio puertorriqueño en la literature de los EEUU By: Bellver Sáez, Pilar; Atlantis: Revista de la Asociación Española de Estudios Ingleses y Norteamericanos, 2006 June; 28 (1): 101–13.
2. Nicholasa Mohr (1938-) By: Sánchez González, Lisa. IN: West-Durán, Herrera-Sobek, and Salgado, Latino and Latina Writers, I: Introductory Essays, Chicano and Chicana Authors; II: Cuban and Cuban American Authors, Dominican and Other Authors, Puerto Rican Authors. New York, NY: Scribner's; 2004. pp. 905–16
3. Nicholasa Mohr, A Matter of Pride and Other Stories By: González, Lisa Sánchez. IN: Quintana, Reading U. S. Latina Writers: Remapping American Literature. New York, NY: Palgrave Macmillan; 2003. pp. 141–49
4. Prophesy Freedom: Puerto Rican Women's Literature as a Source for Latina Feminist Theology By: Delgado, Teresa. IN: Pilar Aquino, Machado, and Rodríguez, A Reader in Latina Feminist Theology: Religion and Justice. Austin, TX: U of Texas P; 2002. pp. 23–52
5. Border Spaces in Nicholasa Mohr's Growing Up inside the Sanctuary of My Imagination By: Vásquez, Mary S.; Bilingual Review/La Revista Bilingüe, 2001 Jan-2002 Apr; 26 (1): 26–33.
6. Pa'lante: An Interview with Nicholasa Mohr By: Kevane, Bridget. IN: Kevane, and Heredia, Latina Self-Portraits: Interviews with Contemporary Women Writers. Albuquerque, NM: U of New Mexico P; 2000. pp. 83–96
7. Bildungsroman Written by Puerto Rican Women in the United States: Nicholasa Mohr's Nilda: A Novel and Esmeralda Santiago's When I Was Puerto Rican By: Muñiz, Ismael; Atenea, 1999 June; 19 (1–2): 79–101.
8. The Wretched Refuse at the Golden Door: Nicholasa Mohr's 'The English Lesson' and America's Persistent Patronizing of Immigrants By: Dwyer, June; Proteus: A Journal of Ideas, 1994 Fall; 11 (2): 45–48.
9. Nicholasa Mohr (1 November 1938 – ) By: Miller, John C.. IN: Luis and González, Modern Latin-American Fiction Writers: Second Series. Detroit, MI: Gale; 1994. pp. 170–77
10. Down These City Streets: Exploring Urban Space in El Bronx Remembered and The House on Mango Street By: Heredia, Juanita; Mester, 1993 Fall-1994 Spring; 22-23 (2–1): 93–105.
11. De Puerto Rico a Nueva York: Protagonistas femeninas en busca de un espacio propio By: Rodríguez-Luis, Julio; La Torre: Revista de la Universidad de Puerto Rico, 1993 July-Dec; 7 (27-28 [2]): 577–94.
12. The Concept of Puerto Rico as Paradise Island in the Works of Two Puerto Rican Authors on the Mainland: Nicolasa Mohr and Edward Rivera By: Miller, John; Torre de Papel, 1993 Summer; 3 (2): 57–64.
13. The Puerto Rican 'Rainbow': Distortions vs. Complexities By: Gregory, Lucille H.; Children's Literature Association Quarterly, 1993 Spring; 18 (1): 29–35.
14. Latina Narrative and Politics of Signification: Articulation, Antagonism, and Populist Rupture By: McCracken, Ellen; Crítica: A Journal of Critical Essays (Univ. of California, San Diego), 1990 Fall; 2 (2): 202–07.
15. The Journey toward a Common Ground: Struggle and Identity of Hispanics in the U.S.A. By: Mohr, Nicholasa; The Americas Review: A Review of Hispanic Literature and Art of the USA, 1990 Spring; 18 (1): 81–85.
16. Growing Up Puertorriqueña: The Feminist Bildungsroman and the Novels of Nicholasa Mohr and Magalí García Ramis By: Fernández Olmos, Margarite; Centro, 1989–90 Winter; 2 (7): 56–73.
17. Puerto Rican Writers in the U.S., Puerto Rican Writers in Puerto Rico: A Separation beyond Language: Testimonio By: Mohr, Nicholasa. IN: Horno-Delgado, Ortega, Scott, and Sternbach, Breaking Boundaries: Latina Writing and Critical Readings. Amherst: U of Massachusetts P; 1989. pp. 111–116
18. Puerto Rican Writers in the United States, Puerto Rican Writers in Puerto Rico: A Separation beyond Language By: Mohr, Nicholasa; The Americas Review: A Review of Hispanic Literature and Art of the USA, 1987 Summer; 15 (2): 87–92.
19. An Interview with Nicholasa Mohr By: Natov, Roni; The Lion and the Unicorn: A Critical Journal of Children's Literature, 1987 Apr.; 11 (1): 116–121.
20. Back Down These Mean Streets: Introducing Nicholasa Mohr and Louis Reyes Rivera By: Flores, Juan; Revista Chicano-Riquena, 1980; 8 (2): 51–56.
21. Nicholasa Mohr: Neorican Writings in Progress: 'A View of the Other Culture' By: Miller, John C.; Revista/Review Interamericana, 1979; 9: 543–54.
22. The Emigrant and New York City: A Consideration of Four Puerto Rican Writers By: Miller, John C.; MELUS, 1978 Fall; 5 (3): 82–99.

== See also ==
- List of Puerto Ricans
- List of Puerto Rican writers
- Latin American literature
- Nuyorican Movement
- Nuyorican Poets Café
- Puerto Rican literature
- German immigration to Puerto Rico
