= Corretjer =

Corretjer is a surname. Notable people with the surname include:

- Juan Antonio Corretjer (1908–1985), Puerto Rican poet
- Millie Corretjer (born 1974), Puerto Rican and Mexican singer and actress
- Zoé Jiménez Corretjer, Puerto Rican author
