= Pura Belpré =

Puerto Rican writer, puppeteer, and librarian

- Born: February 2, 1899; Cidra, Puerto Rico
- Died: July 1, 1982 (aged 83); New York City, New York
- Occupations: writer, puppeteer, librarian
- Spouse: Clarence Cameron White (m. 1943; died 1960)
- Writing career
- Notable awards: New York Mayor's Award

Pura Teresa Belpré y Nogueras (February 2, 1899 – July 1, 1982) was an Afro-Puerto Rican educator who served as the first Puerto Rican librarian in New York City. She was also a writer, collector of folktales, and puppeteer.

== Life ==
Belpré was born in Cidra, Puerto Rico. There is some dispute as to the date of her birth which has been given as February 2, 1899, December 2, 1901 and February 2, 1903. (Note: A letter from Winifred O'C. Luthy dated May 5th, 1969 to Pura Belpré acknowledges Belpré's wish to have Belpré's date of birth listed as Feb. 2nd, 1903.) Belpré graduated from Central High School in Santurce, Puerto Rico in 1919 and enrolled at the University of Puerto Rico in Río Piedras, planning to become a teacher. But in 1920, while attending her sister Elisa's New York City wedding, she was recruited as part of a public library campaign to hire young women from ethnically diverse backgrounds. This first job led to a remarkable career that had Belpré travel the city, from the Bronx to the Lower East Side, telling stories in both English and Spanish, something that hadn't been done before. Belpré broke the barriers that had led the Spanish-speaking community to believe the libraries were only for people using the English language." Except for brief interludes, Belpré remained in New York City for the rest of her life.

== Librarianship ==
Belpré's career in the New York Public Library commenced in 1921, and she pioneered the library's outreach within the Puerto Rican community. However, like many of the Puerto Rican women who migrated to New York in the twentieth century, Belpré first held a job in the garment industry. Her Spanish language, community and literary skills soon earned her a position as Hispanic Assistant in a branch of the public library at 135th Street in Harlem. She was recruited and mentored by library head Ernestine Rose, and Belpré became the first Puerto Rican hired by the New York Public Library (NYPL).

In 1925 she began her formal studies in the Library School of the New York Public Library. In 1929, due to the increasing numbers of Puerto Ricans settling in southwest Harlem, Belpré was transferred to a branch of the NYPL at 115th Street. She quickly became an active advocate for the Spanish-speaking community by instituting bilingual story hours, buying Spanish language books, and implementing programs based on traditional holidays including the celebration of Three Kings Day. In her outreach efforts, she attended meetings of civic organizations such as the Puerto Rican Brotherhood of America and La Liga Puertorriqueña e Hispana. Through Belpré's work, the 115th Street branch became an important cultural center for the Latino residents of New York, even hosting important Latin American figures such as the Mexican muralist Diego Rivera. Belpré continued these efforts at the 110th street (or Aguilar) branch.

== Literary career ==
Belpré's library career is intimately tied to her literary career. The first story she wrote and published was Pérez and Martina, a love story between a cockroach and a mouse. Belpré also collected many other folktales from Puerto Rico, translated them into English and had them published as children's literature.

In 1940, Belpré met African-American composer and violinist, Clarence Cameron White. They were married on December 26, 1943 and Belpré resigned her position to go on tour with White and devote her energies to writing. When White died in 1960, Belpré returned to part-time work in the library as the Spanish Children's Specialist, traveling throughout the city wherever there were large numbers of Latino children. In 1968 she retired from this position, but she was persuaded to work with the newly established South Bronx Library Project, a community outreach program to promote library use and to provide needed services to Latino neighborhoods throughout the Bronx.

Belpré wrote the first major Juan Bobo story published in the United States, Juan Bobo and the Queen's Necklace: A Puerto Rican Folk Tale. It was published in 1962.

== Death ==
Belpré died on July 1, 1982, having received the New York Mayor's Award for Arts and Culture that same year. Her archives are held and maintained by the Center for Puerto Rican Studies at Hunter College in New York.

== Legacy ==
The Pura Belpré Award was established in 1996 as an homage to Pura Belpré. It is a children's book award presented annually to the Latino/Latina writer and illustrator whose work best portrays, affirms, and celebrates the Latino cultural experience in an outstanding work of literature for children and youth. The Pura Belpré Award is co-sponsored by REFORMA: the National Association to Promote Library and Information Services to Latinos and the Spanish-Speaking and the Association for Library Service to Children (ALSC), a division of the American Library Association (ALA). The Northeast Chapter of REFORMA named its children's book achievement award in her honor in the 1980s. The award was initially given biannually from 1996-2008 and is currently given annually where three medals are awarded to a Latino author of an outstanding children’s book, a Latino author of an outstanding young adult book, and one to a Latino illustrator for creating an outstanding children’s picture book. The young adult category was first added in 2021.

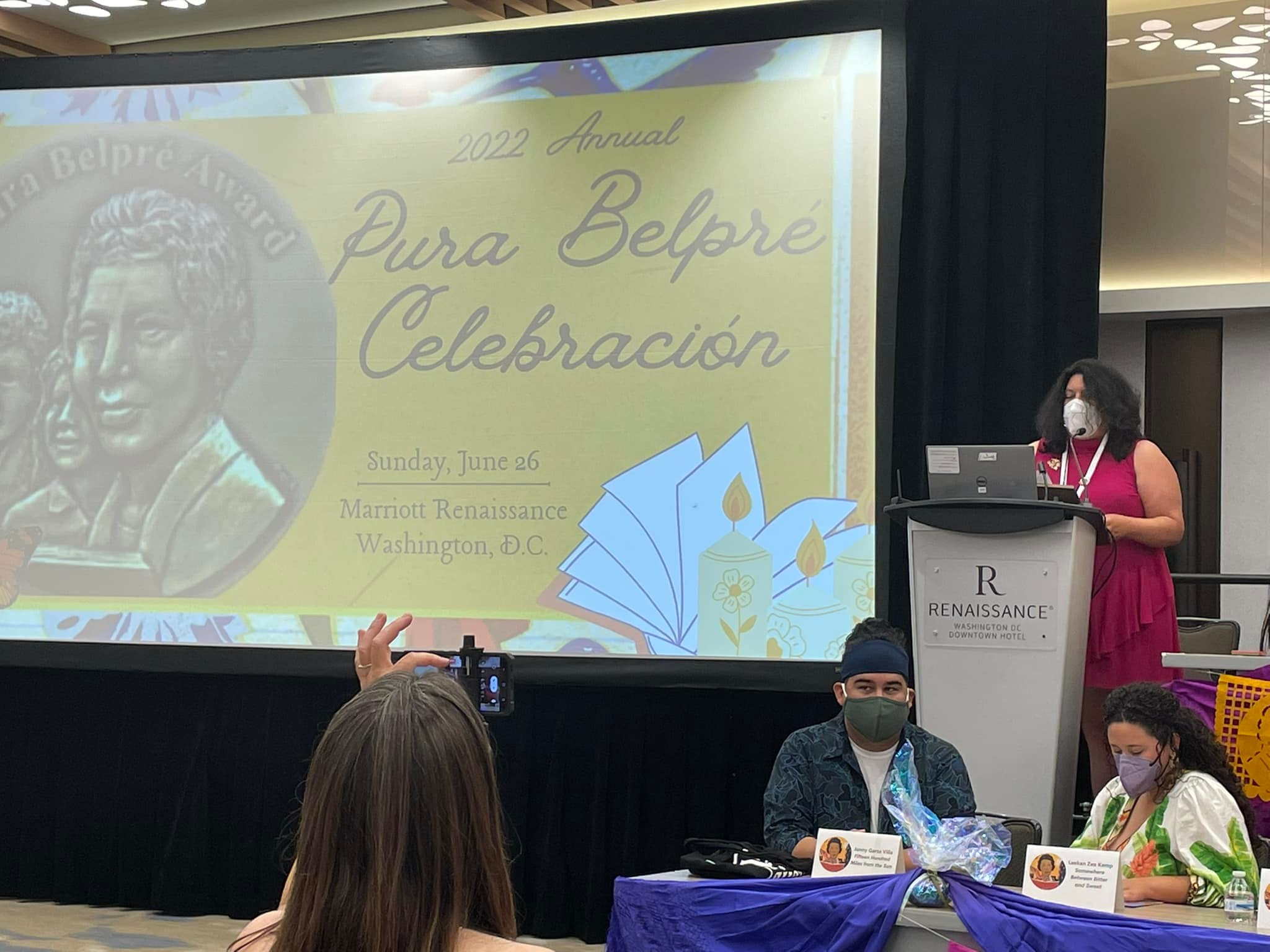
Pura Belpré Award Celebracion 2022

In the Bronx, New York Public School 64 on Walton Avenue near 170th Street has been named after her. In 2022, 109th Street and Lexington Avenue in East Harlem was named Pura Belpré Way.

A documentary film about the life and work of Pura Belpré was produced in 2011, and is available for viewing at the Centro de Estudios Puertorriqueños at Hunter College.

The Pura Belpré Papers, held at the Archives of the Puerto Rican Diaspora, Center for Puerto Rican Studies "are an important source for the study of Puerto Rican children's literature, folk tales, and legends. They are valuable for examining relationships between the Puerto Rican community and a major institution such as the New York Public Library. Additionally, the papers document the formation and organizational development of the Puerto Rican community in New York City."

Some juvenile biographies have been published teaching children about the life of Pura Belpré with some having both English and Spanish editions. Examples include Planting Stories: The Life of Librarian and Storyteller Pura Belpré by Anika Aldamuy Denise (with the Spanish language edition title being Sembrando historias: Pura Belpré: bibliotecaria y narradora de cuentos), Pura's Cuentos: How Pura Belpré Reshaped Libraries with Her Stories (with the Spanish language edition title being Los Cuentos de Pura Belpré) by Annette Bay Pimentel, The Life of / La vida de Pura (a bilingual English/Spanish book) by Patty Rodriguez and Ariana Stein, and She Persisted: Pura Belpré by Meg Medina, Marilisa Jiménez García and Chelsea Clinton (with the Spanish title being Ella persistió: Pura Belpré).

== Bibliography of Belpré's works ==
Books in English

- Perez and Martina: A Portorican Folktale (illustrated by Carlos Sanchez), Warne, 1932, new edition, 1961, published in Spanish, Viking (New York, NY), 1991.
- The Three Magi found in the anthology "The Animals' Christmas" by Anne Thaxter Eaton, 1944.
- The Tiger and the Rabbit, and Other Tales (illustrated by Kay Peterson Parker), Houghton, 1946, new edition (illustrated by Tomie de Paola), Lippincott, 1965.
- Juan Bobo and the Queen's Necklace: A Puerto Rican Folk Tale (illustrated by Christine Price), Warne, 1962.
- Ote: A Puerto Rican Folk Tale (illustrated by Paul Galdone), Pantheon, 1969.
- Santiago (illustrated by Symeon Shimin), Warne, 1969.
- (With Mary K. Conwell) Libros en Espanol: An Annotated List of Children's Books in Spanish, New York Public Library, 1971.
- Dance of the Animals: A Puerto Rican Folk Tale (illustrated by Paul Galdone), Warne, 1972.
- Once in Puerto Rico (illustrated by C. Price), Warne, 1973.
  - Which includes: The Land of Brave Men; The Legend of the Royal Palm; Guani; The Legend of the Hummingbird; Amapola and the Butterfly; Iviahoca; Yuisa and Pedro Mexias; The Legend of the Ceiba of Ponce; The Little Blue Light; Three Tales of Old San Juan: The Chapel on Cristo Street, The Cistern of San Cristobal, and The Rogativa; The Miracle of Hormigueros; Pedro Animala and the Carrao Bird; The Stone Dog; The Parrot Who Wouldn't Say Cataño; and Pablo and the Pirate's Ghost.
- A Rainbow-Colored Horse (illustrated by Antonio Martorell), Warne, 1978.
- Firefly Summer, Piñata Books (Houston, TX), 1996.

Translations into Spanish

- Munro Leaf, El Cuento de Ferdinand ("The Story of Ferdinand"), Viking, 1962.
- Crosby N. Bonsall, Caso del Forastero Hambriento ("Case of the Hungry Stranger"), Harper, 1969.
- Carla Greene, Camioneros: ¿Qué Hacen? ("Truck Drivers: What Do They Do?"), Harper, 1969.
- Syd Hoff, Danielito y el Dinosauro ("Danny and the Dinosaur"), Harper, 1969.
- Leonard Kessler, Aquí Viene el Ponchado ("Here Comes the Strikeout"), Harper, 1969.
- Else Holmelund Minarik, Osito ("Little Bear"), Harper, 1969.
- Millicent E. Selsam, Teresita y las Orugas ("Terry and the Caterpillar"), Harper, 1969.
- Paul Newman, Ningún Lugar para Jugar ("No Place to Play"), Grosset, 1971.

== See also ==
- List of Latin American writers
- List of Puerto Rican writers
- List of Puerto Ricans
- Puerto Rican literature
- Multi-Ethnic Literature of the United States

== Additional sources ==
- Susan Heller, Anderson (May 21, 1982). "6 Patrons of the Arts Receive Mayor's Awards of Honor". New York Times. New York, N.Y. p. C7.
- Contemporary Authors Online, Gale, 2006. Reproduced in Biography Resource Center. Farmington Hills, Mich.: Thomson Gale. 2006.
- Núñez, Victoria. Memory, History, and Latino Migrant Literary Practices and New Historical Perspectives on Puerto Rican Migrations to New York.
