= Alfredo Miguel Aguayo Sánchez =

Puerto Rican educator and writer

- Born: March 28, 1866; Ponce, Puerto Rico
- Died: April 30, 1948 (aged 82); Havana, Cuba
- Occupation: Educator

Alfredo Miguel Aguayo Sánchez (March 28, 1866 – April 30, 1948) was a Puerto Rican educator and writer. He studied and lived in Cuba, and was a professor at the University of Havana. His teachings and his written works molded several generations of Cubans.

== Early years ==
Alfredo Miguel Aguayo Sánchez was born in Ponce, Puerto Rico, on March 28, 1866. While he was still a child, his family moved to Havana, Cuba, where he was educated. There he earned a law degree (1892) and a doctor of education degree (1903). He was the grandson of Nicolás Aguayo, an educator in Puerto Rico.

== Superintendent of schools ==
He was appointed Superintendent of Schools for the Province of Havana. After this he became a professor of education at the University of Havana. He founded and edited the Magazine of Education in Havana. In 1912 he established the Laboratory of Child Study at the University.

== Educator ==
Aguayo Sánchez fought to bring relevance to the importance of child psychology in the learning process. He was also a torch-bearer of the implementation of the most current teaching methods, including the American pragmatism methods headed by John Dewey.

At the time of the closing of the University of Havana during the dictatorship of Gerardo Machado, Aguayo organized the Academia Pedagógica de La Habana, to look after the training of teachers. He also taught at the Escuela del Círculo de Trabajadores de La Habana (1884), at the Instituto de San Manuel y San Francisco, and at the Colegio La Divina Caridad.

== Later life ==
He lived as an exile in Puerto Rico and the United States from 1895 to 1897, as a result of independentista views written by his father but attributed to him. During the dictatorship of Gerardo Machado, Aguayo was detained under suspicion that he had subversive ideas. In 1944 he was awarded the status of Professor Emeritus at the University of Havana. He died in Havana, Cuba, on April 30, 1948.

== Legacy ==
- In Cuba, a municipal elementary school was named after him in the municipality of Havana, built in 1936 on Estrada Palma street in Santos Suárez.
- In Playa de Ponce there is high school named after him.

== Books by Aguayo ==
The following are books written by Alfredo M. Aguayo y Sanchez:

- La escuela primaria como debe ser.
- Enseñanza de la lengua materna, en la escuela primaria.
- Pedagogía del escolar.
- Luis Vives como educador.

== See also ==
- List of Latin American writers
- List of Puerto Rican writers
- List of Puerto Ricans
- Puerto Rican literature
- Multi-Ethnic Literature of the United States
- Before Columbus Foundation
