= Abraham Rodriguez =

Abraham Rodriguez may refer to:

- Abraham Rodriguez (novelist) (born 1960), American novelist
- Abraham Rodriguez (soccer) (born 2002), American soccer player
