= Aravind Enrique Adyanthaya =

Puerto Rican theater director and playwright

- Born: 1965 (age 60–61); Lajas, Puerto Rico
- Occupations: Short story writer, playwright
- Writing career
- Notable works: La mano Las facultades
- Notable awards: Pregones Asunción Playwrights Award
- Website: www.casacruzdelaluna.org

Aravind Enrique Adyanthaya (born 1965) is a Puerto Rican writer, performer, and theater director. He is the founding artistic director of Casa Cruz de la Luna, an experimental theater company and cultural center established in 1998 that was based in a former residence and commercial space in the historical district of San Germán, Puerto Rico until 2022. Through Casa Cruz de la Luna, he has directed innovative productions of works by Federico García Lorca, Miguel de Cervantes, and Puerto Rican writer Pepe Liboy.

Adyanthaya is known for his unique approach called "escritura acto" or "writing act," which transforms the stage into a space for live, on-stage computerized writing, creating a convergence of written and spoken words before the audience. As a writer of fiction, his works Lajas and La Mano have garnered literary recognition, including awards from the PEN Club of Puerto Rico and the Ateneo Puertorriqueño literary competition.

== Early life and education ==
Aravind Enrique Adyanthaya's father, B. Aravind Adyanthaya, was a Tulu orthopedic surgeon born in Mangalore, India; he died in 1971. His mother, Dr. Angela A. Ramírez-Irizarry, was born in the town of Lajas, Puerto Rico, and was a plastic surgeon in the southwest of the island until her death in 2021.

Adyanthaya received his MD at the Mayo Clinic in Minnesota in 1992. That same year he traveled to the southwest of India, where he did a rotation at St. John's Hospital in Bangalore. Soon after, he began graduate studies in theater at the University of Minnesota, leading to the doctor's degree in theater historiography. He wrote a dissertation on 18th century French public spectacles.

== Career ==
Adyanthaya founded Casa Cruz de la Luna in Puerto Rico in 1998. This cultural center is located in an old building in the historic district of San Germán. Working with the Casa Cruz de la Luna Theater Company, Adyanthaya has done experimental staging of several plays by Federico García Lorca, of one of Miguel de Cervantes's exemplary novels, and of several stories by the Puerto Rican author Pepe Liboy. Adyanthaya has also written about San Germán.

== Artistic style ==
Adyanthaya's theories and practices of escritura acto (writing act) propose a way of conceiving the stage as a ground of multiple lines of communication and miscommunication in which the live production and reception of mediated written and spoken words converge. Adyanthaya began to develop this new poetics based on live, on-stage computerized writing in 2002. It is implemented through a series of one-man shows in which the author writes the text in front of the audience on a computer that is projected on a screen. Prometheus Bound, his best-known piece, approaches the tragedy of Aeschylus. In another piece, The Library, based on the story "The Library of Babel" by Jorge Luis Borges, Adyanthaya makes use of the Santa María Magdalena de Pazzis Cemetery in Old San Juan to explore the notion of deposits. In 2009, he expanded the techniques of writing act in creating The Marquis de Sade Is Afraid of the Sea.

As a writer of fiction, Adyanthaya's first book of stories, Lajas (2002), took well-known stories of his family as a starting point. The result was a kaleidoscopic, fantastic, bizarre, vision of his hometown. Lajas won the first prize of the PEN Club of Puerto Rico and the Ateneo Puertorriqueño literary competition. In his second book of fiction The Hand (2010), Adyanthaya explores medical, mystical, everyday, and unintelligible events.

== Awards ==
Adyanthaya has been awarded a Jerome Playwriting Fellowship and a McKnight Advancement Grant, both from the Playwrights' Center; a Jerome Performance Art Fellowship by Intermedia Arts and an Artist of Color Directing Fellow at New York Theatre Workshop. For his play The Faculties, he received the Pregones Theater's Asunción Prize and First Prize in Theatre at Casa de Teatro in the Dominican Republic.

== Works ==
=== Plays ===
- Hagiografías (Hagiographies), a series exploring the notion of quotidian sainthood (1998–2006)
- Íconos de Vellonera (Jukebox Icons): winner of the Institute of Puerto Rican Culture's Playwriting Award (2004)
- Las facultades / The Faculties, winner of the 2007 International Playwriting Award from Casa del Teatro, Dominican Republic, and the 2008 Asunción Prize from Pregones Theater
- Quisimos tanto a Lydia, featured at the 2008 Latin American Theatre Today Congress
- Prometheus Bound (based on Aeschylus' tragedy), shown as a special presentation at the American Society for Theatre Research 2009 Conference
- The Marquis de Sade Is Afraid of the Sea, an "escritura acto" ensemble piece, which toured universities in Puerto Rico in 2009
- La Mano (The Hand), a musical theatre/performance piece which premiered in Puerto Rico in 2010 and in New York City in 2011

=== Publications ===
- Lajas (short stories / performance text), Isla Negra Editores, San Juan, Puerto Rico (2002) ISBN 1-881715-97-3
- The Mystery of the Birds (playscript), Playscripts Inc., New York (2003)
- A Chinese Tale (playscript), Alexander Street Press, Virginia (2003)
- Monthly column in the weekly Claridad, San Juan, Puerto Rico (2004)
- El X-mático / X-matic (children's story), English and Spanish editions, Alfaguara, San Juan (2009)
- La ciudad de vidrio / The Glass City (children's story), English and Spanish editions, Alfaguara, San Juan (2009)
- The Faculties / Las facultades (playscript with prologue, bilingual edition), Concepción 8 Press, San Germán (2010) ISBN 978-0-9820404-1-6
- La Mano (collection of short stories and one-act plays), Concepción 8 Press, San Germán (2010) ISBN 978-0-9820404-2-3

== See also ==
- List of Puerto Ricans
- List of Puerto Rican writers
- Puerto Rican literature
- Puerto Ricans in the United States
