= Edward Rivera =

Nuyorican writer, educator and editor

Edward Rivera (1944-2001) was an American writer, educator and editor with Puerto-Rican roots (Nuyorican). Born in Puerto Rico, from age 7 Rivera grew up in New York. He was a mentor to writers Abraham Rodríguez and Ernesto Quiñonez.

== Career ==
Rivera's only major work, the novel Family Installments: Memories of Growing up Hispanic, reportedly took ten years to write. Facing attempts at fetishization of the Nuyorican experience, it took three years for Family Installments to be published. The novel utilizes many stylistic tools, from flashbacks to a mix of oral and official histories. Rivera famously looked to Mark Twain as an influence, and the novel indicates this, creating an intertextual conversation. Though Rivera insisted that Family Installments was a novel, many critics found it to be heavily influenced by Rivera's life.
