= Antonio S. Pedreira =

Puerto Rican activist

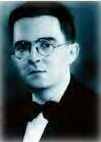
- Dr. Antonio S. Pedreira
- Born: Antonio Salvador Pedreira Pizarro; June 13, 1899; San Juan, Puerto Rico
- Died: October 23, 1939 (aged 40); San Juan, Puerto Rico
- Occupations: Writer; educator
- Writing career
- Notable work: Insularismo

Dr. Antonio S. Pedreira (June 13, 1899 – October 23, 1939), was a Puerto Rican writer and educator.

== Early years ==
Pedreira (whose full name was Antonio Salvador Pedreira Pizarro) was born into a well-to-do family in San Juan. His father was a Spaniard, and his mother was Puerto Rican. Both died when he was quite young, and he was thereafter raised by his godparents in Caguas. He became interested in the art of writing stories as a child during his primary and secondary school years. He attended the University of Puerto Rico after graduating from high school and earned his teacher's certificate.

== Nationalist ==
In 1920, Pedreira traveled to New York City with the intention of becoming a medical doctor and enrolled in the school of medicine of Columbia University in that city. He was exposed to the realities of racial discrimination, which was rampant in the city at that time, during his brief stay. This was one of the many factors which influenced Pedreira decision to join the Puerto Rican Nationalist movement while at the same time becoming an open advocate for Puerto Rico's independence. He dropped out of medical school because of financial problems and returned to Puerto Rico.

In Puerto Rico, he was granted a scholarship by the government and attended the University of Puerto Rico once again. In 1925, Pedreira earned a Bachelor of Arts degree. He continued his higher education and in 1928 earned a master's degree in Letters. Pedreria then moved to Spain to pursue a doctorate in Philosophy and Letters at the Central University of Madrid, which he earned in 1932. He returned to his homeland upon graduation.

== Author ==
Pedreira held the position of professor of Spanish literature at both the University of Puerto Rico and Columbia University. Eventually, the University of Puerto Rico named him Director of the Department of Hispanic Studies. Pedreira believed that Puerto Rico was in danger of losing its cultural identity and expressed his beliefs in a daily column titled "Aclaraciones y críticas" (Clarification and criticism), published in El Mundo newspaper. He also founded and co-edited a magazine that went by the title "Indice". Few scholars have studied the works of Eugenio María de Hostos as he did.

== Insularismo ==
In 1934, Pedreira authored his most important book, Insularismo, in which he explores the meaning of being Puerto Rican. This includes an in-depth study of the intertwining of the Spanish, Taino and African cultures. In his book he also talks about the cultural survival of the Puerto Rican identity after the island was invaded by the United States.

== Written works ==
Other works by Pedreira are:

- Artistas (1930)
- Hostos, ciudadano de América (1932)
- La actualidad del jíbaro (1935)
- El año terrible del 87' (1937)

== Aftermath ==
Dr. Antonio S. Pedreira died of pneumonia on October 23, 1939, in San Juan, Puerto Rico and was buried the Puerto Rico Memorial Cemetery in Carolina, Puerto Rico. His memory was honored by naming a school and a main avenue with his name. He was an active member of Phi Eta Mu fraternity, besides that, other associations recognized his importance in the Puerto Rican culture. The best example is that starting in 1940, Phi Sigma Alpha fraternity gave the annual "Premio Antonio S. Pedreira" award to the most outstanding student in Puerto Rican Literature in the University of Puerto Rico.

== See also ==
- List of Puerto Rican writers
- List of Puerto Ricans
- Puerto Rican literature
