= Iván Segarra Báez =

Puerto Rican novelist and poet (1967–2022)

- Born: 10 July 1967; Caguas, Puerto Rico
- Died: 19 October 2022 (aged 55)
- Occupations: poet, novelist
- Writing career
- Notable awards: Libro d' Oro, diploma di Merito

Iván Segarra Báez (July 10, 1967 – October 19, 2022) was a Puerto Rican novelist and poet. He wrote books of poems: Candela (1997), Entre tu cuerpo y mi alma (2000) and Hay veces que llora el mar (2001) and novels.

== Works ==
Earned a PhD from the Centro de Estudios Avanzados de Puerto Rico y El Caribe. Was an associate professor at the Pontifical Catholic University of Puerto Rico.

Báez poetry books were being published since 1997 and include Candela (1997), Entre tu cuerpo y mi alma (2000) and Hay veces que llora el mar (2001).

His first novel, El Guardián de la Lujuria, was published in 2003. In Trento, Italy, the publishing house Edizioni Universum awarded him the Libro d' Oro, diploma di Merito for this work January 29, 2003. His second novel is titled La República del Generalísimo and was published in 2004.

Báez's third book, published in 2005 is Ante la luz de un amor prohibido (ISBN 956-8230-18-1) and is a collection of four poems.

Báez was the Director of Revista Literaria de Puerto Rico, the Literary Magazine of Puerto Rico and a member of Grupo Embeleco Poético.

His book Los hijos del desastre, about a society that is destroyed by capitalism, was published in 2017.

== Personal life ==
Báez was born in Caguas, Puerto Rico on July 10, 1967 and died on October 19, 2022. He was buried at Cementerio Porta Coeli in San Germán, Puerto Rico.

== See also ==
- List of Puerto Rican writers
- List of Puerto Ricans
- Puerto Rican literature

== Bibliography ==
- "Los Poetas: Biografía de Iván Segarra Báez".
- "El Otro Mensual: Iván Segarra Báez".
