= Alfredo Villanueva Collado =

Puerto Rican writer and scholar (1944–2020)

- Born: October 16, 1944; Santurce, Puerto Rico
- Died: September 5, 2020 (aged 75); New York City, New York United States
- Website: www.alfavil-grimorio.blogspot.com

Alfredo Villanueva Collado (Santurce, Puerto Rico, October 16, 1944 – New York City, September 5, 2020) was an openly gay Puerto Rican writer and scholar who taught English literature. He lived in New York City.

== Biography ==
He was born on October 16, 1944, in Santurce, Puerto Rico. His parents, Narciso Villanueva and Arminda Collado Martell, were originally from Mayagüez. When he was nine months old, his parents moved to Caracas, Venezuela, where his father had worked previously. He attended the Escuela Experimental Venezuela and the Instituto Escuela. He returned to Puerto Rico when he was fifteen years old, and completed his studies at Colegio San José in 1960.

He studied British literature in Río Piedras at the University of Puerto Rico. Also pursuing an additional general specialization in literature, he obtained a B.A. (1964) and an M.A (1966), with a thesis on the poetics of Matthew Arnold.

In 1966 he received a fellowship to study at Binghamton University, in New York, where he obtained a PhD in comparative literature in 1974.

He worked as a professor at Medgar Evers College, CUNY, and shortly after became a professor in the English Department at Hostos Community College. He wrote poetry and prose, publishing short stories, essays, autobiographical texts, and a text book. He retired in 2003.

On Puerto Rican poetry published in English and not Spanish, he said:

«la poesía puertorriqueña de los Estados Unidos fluye por dos vertientes determinadas por el idioma que se utiliza tanto como identificación que los autores hacen de su propia nacionalidad: una diaspórica, en español, y una que se puede considerar literatura étnica estadounidense dentro de la ficción multicultural.»

For eighteen years, he was the partner of graphic artist Víctor Amador.

== Publications ==
He published eleven books of poetry, as well as poems in magazines and journals such as Revista de Venezuela, Taller al aire libre, La nuez, Casa tomada and Revista Letras among others. He published articles in journals including Confluencia, Revista Iberoamericana, Revista de Estudios Hispánicos and Romance Language Annual. Part of his work was published in on-line journals.

=== Books of Poetry ===
- Las transformaciones del vidrio. Editorial Oasis, 1985.
- Antología, Pliego de Murmurios. Sabadell, VII-91, 1987.
- Grimorio. Colección Murmurios 1988.
- En el imperio de la papa frita. Editorial Colmena, 1989.
- La voz de la mujer que llevo dentro. Arcas, 1990.
- Pato salvaje. Arcas, 1991.
- Entre la inocencia y la manzana. Universidad de Puerto Rico, 1996.
- La voz de su dueño. Latino Press, 1999.
- Pan errante. Pontevedra. Taller del Poeta, 2005.

=== Works in Poetry Anthologies ===
- Poesía puertorriqueña, 1984–85. (Mairena, 1986).
- Poesía Actual, 1988. (Pliegos, 1988).
- Papiros de Babel: Antología de la poesía puertorriqueña en Nueva York. (UPR,1991).
- Antología infinita No.1 (1992). (Centro Español, 1992).
- Poesida: An Anthology of AIDS Poetry from the United States, Latin America and Spain.(Ollantay 1996).
- Como ángeles en llamas/Algunas voces Latinoamericanas del siglo XX/Selección. (Maribelina, 2004)
- Poesía puertorriqueña del siglo XX: Antología (UPR, 2004).
- El verbo descerrajado: antología de poemas en solidaridad con los presos políticos de Chile (Apostrophe, 2005).
- Cauteloso engaño del sentido. (Libros de la luna, 2007).

=== Works in Narrative Anthologies ===
- Where Angels Tread at Dawn: New Stories from Latin America. (Lippincott, 1990).
- Cuentos hispánicos de los Estados Unidos. (Arte Público Press, 1993).
- Hecho(s) en Nueva York: Cuentos Latinoamericanos. (The Latino Press, 1994).
- Low Rent: A Decade of Prose and Photographs from The Portable Lower East Side Review. (Grove Press, 1994).
- Tu Mundo: Primer Curso para Hispanoparlantes. (D.C. Heath, 1997).
- "Nochebuena", en Hispanic American Christmas Stories. (Oxford, 2000).
- Mundo 21 Hispano. (Houghton Mifflin 2004).
- Literatura Puertorriqueña del Siglo XX. (UPR, 2004).
- Aquí me tocó escribir. (Trabe, 2006)
- Los otros cuerpos: Antología de temática gay, lésbica y queer desde Puerto Rico y su diáspora. (Editorial Tiempo Nuevo, 2007)

=== Scholarship (Articles Published in Books) ===
- Hispanic Immigrant Writers and the Question of Identity. (Ollantay, 1989).
- Latin American Writers on Gay and Lesbian Themes. (Greenwood, 1994).
- From Romanticismo to Modernismo. (Garland, 1997)
- Leyendo a Silva III. (Instituto Caro y Cuervo, 1997)
- U.S. Latino Literature: A Guide for Students and Teachers. (Greenwood, 2000).
- Oxford Dictionary of USA Latinos. (Oxford, 2005).
- L’altra Penelope. (Roma: Oedipus, 2009).

=== Articles in Scholarly Journals ===
- "El Antinous de Fernando Pessoa: Una relectura". Auliga: Asociación Internacional de Amigos da Universidade Libre Iberoamericana en Galicia. (Con Santos Abersio Núñez). May 2004.
- "Max Nordau, cultura helénica e inversión sexual en De sobremesa, de José Asunción Silva". CiberLetras, vol. 12.
- "Rene Marqués, Ángel Lozada, and the Constitution of the (Queer) Puerto Rican National Subject". CENTRO Journal, Puerto Rican Queer Studies Issue, Spring 2007.

== Awards and Recognitions ==
- 2006: First prize, poetry and short story, Casa tomada (New York).

== See also ==
- Puerto Rican literature
- List of Puerto Rican writers
