= Pedro Juan Soto =

Puerto Rican writer

- Born: July 11, 1928; Cataño, Puerto Rico
- Died: November 7, 2002 (aged 74); San Juan, Puerto Rico
- Occupation: writer
- Children: Roberto Alfonso Soto Arriví, Carlos Enrique Soto Arriví, Juan Manuel Soto Arriví, Gerard Miguel Soto
- Writing career
- Notable works: Spiks, Usmaíl

Pedro Juan Soto (July 11, 1928 - November 7, 2002) was a Puerto Rican writer, activist, and playwright who is known for inspiring Puerto Rican Independence in his novels and short stories. In his stories, he depicts the life of people living in Puerto Rico under United States occupation during the 1930s to the Puerto Rican diaspora to the United States in the 1950s.

== Personal life ==
Pedro Juan Soto was born in Cataño, Puerto Rico, and went to primary and secondary school in Bayamón. In 1946, at the age of eighteen, he moved to New York City and attended Long Island University. He initially studied to become a doctor, but after being influenced by the works of Ernest Hemingway, he decided to study English and American Literature.

During an Interview conducted in 2002, shortly before his death, Pedro Juan Soto has openly stated that his writing has been inspired by the writings of Ernest Hemingway, Graham Greene, William Faulkner, and José Luis González. Many of his books, primarily Usmaíl, has shown clear parallels with William Faulkner's Light in August.

When asked about how he started to write stories, Soto stated that he learned by conversing with people when he was selling lottery tickets growing up in the La Puntilla slums in Cataño.

On July 25, 1978, one of his sons, Carlos Soto Arriví, was killed by police officers in the Cerro Maravilla Incident. Soto sued the commonwealth government and United States federal authorities for what he called "outright assassination". Soto has stated in 2002 that a novel about this incident is in the works but it has yet to be published.

== Career ==
After graduating from Long Island with a Bachelor of Arts degree, he served in the United States Army during the Korean War. After service, Soto attended Columbia University to obtain a Master of Arts degree in creative writing at Columbia University.

In 1953, Soto's first career writing attempt came with Los perros anónimos (Anonymous Dogs), a short novel based on Puerto Rican participation in the Korean War. It is also around this time that Soto began to publish his early works, Garabatos (Scribblings) and Los inocentes (The Innocents), for which he won awards. In 1956, these collection of short stories were later reprinted in the work, Spiks.

Among Soto's most famous works are Spiks (Monthly Review Press, 1974), which deals with the struggles he and many other Puerto Ricans faced in New York, and Usmaíl, a story set in the Puerto Rican island of Vieques in the early 20th century. Soto was a supporter of the Puerto Rican independence movement, a theme that often shows up in his books.

In 1955, Soto moved back to Puerto Rico, where he continued to write novels and short stories, as well as a few dramas, and he later became a professor at the University of Puerto Rico.

== Spiks ==
Soto's collection of short stories was reprinted in to a collection called Spiks in 1956. The stories in Spiks are about the life of Puerto Ricans living in New York during the World War II period. A major theme in these stories are the contrasting nature between New York City and the island of Puerto Rico, where issues of gender, socio-economic status, and discrimination are experienced by the displaced people of Puerto Rico.

=== La Cautiva (Captive) ===
La Cautiva, "The Captive", is the first of many short stories in the work Spiks. According to Yolanda Martinez-San Miguel in her article Female Sexiles? Toward an Archeology of Displacement of Sexual Minorities in the Caribbean, the 1973 English translated version of Spiks included an author's note explaining that the first short story was the last to be written. Soto used the order of the short stories to create a major theme of departure to set the stage for the rest of the collection. Soto uses The Captive to frame departure by writing about the exile of a 17 year-old girl named Fernanda, from Puerto Rico to New York, after she was caught cheating with her brother-in-law months before her sister's expected baby. Soto uses this story to extrapolate the diasporic phenomenon that was happening in Puerto Rico due to Operation Bootstrap, where many Puerto Ricans were forced to migrate due to the Coercive nature of financial dependence to the United States. Despite the major theme of forceful migration, Soto also explores the issues of patriarchy through the breaking of gender norms by the main character, highlighting the suppression of female sexuality.

=== Los Inocentes (The Innocents) ===
Los Inocentes, "The Innocents", is about the story of a family deciding whether to put their mentally disabled son in a psychiatric institution. The mother argues for him to not be taken to the institute, while the daughter believes that her brother will be better taken care of by the institute. The story goes through the struggles of helping a mentally ill person, especially in places like New York, where nobody knows each other, "even amongst neighbors". Throughout the story, there are signs of mockery and discrimination against mentally ill people, as the mother is insistent that her son remain quiet and not speak to avoid shame. This is contrasted to the island of Puerto Rico, where the mother believes "everyone was close and cared for each other".

=== Garabatos (Scribbles) ===
Garabatos, "Scribbles", is about a poor artist named Rosendo, who is ridiculed by his pregnant wife for being a poor alcohol addict. As a Christmas present for his wife and kids, he decides to paint a canvas of their bathroom-wall, only to be erased and insulted when his wife discovers his work. Although Rosendo is initially negatively portrayed, Rosendo hopes that reminding them of their memories back on the island, the idea for the canvas, would bring joy to his wife and kids. Due to the lack of financial support he provides for his family, his dream and talents of becoming an artist is doubted, even by his own family. According to John Miller. in his article "The Emigrant and New York City: A Consideration of Four Puerto Rican Writers", this short story projects the struggles of a Puerto Rican artist living in New York, which also reflects Soto's life and his career in writing.

== Usmaíl ==
Usmaíl, is a novel written in 1959, that depicts the life of Puerto Ricans in the island of Vieques. The story follows the life of a poor afro Latina boy named Usmaíl derived from "US mail", who is abandoned by his American father and Puerto Rican mother. The overarching theme of this novel centers around racial identity and discriminations faced by Puerto Ricans. The United States Navy, who came to serve and protect, force people off their land to establish their base and other mistreatment and violent ensues. Many critics has shown parallels between this work and in William Faulkner's Light in August, where Usmaíl and Joe Christmas, main character of Light in August, parallels in race, parent abandonment, and mistreatment by intruders due to the color of their skin. When asked about this work, Soto has claimed that violence from this work stems from the colonial system and US occupation since 1898. He states that although speaking out against violence stemming from colonial system is monotonous in Puerto Rican literature, it must be constantly done, through continual improvement in craft and creativity.

== Works ==
=== Books ===
- Los perros anónimos (unpublished), 1950
- Spiks, 1956
- Usmaíl, 1959
- Ardiente suelo, fría estacion, 1961
- El francotirador, 1969
- Temporadora de duendes, 1970
- A solas con Pedro Juan Soto, 1973
- El huésped, las máscaras y otros disfraces, 1974
- Un decir (de la violencia), 1976
- Un oscuro pueblo sonriente, 1982
- Memoria de mi amnesia, 1991
- La sombra lejana, 1999

=== Other works ===
- Los inocentes, 1954
- Las máscaras, 1958
- La Nueva Vida, 1966
- A Solas con Pedro Juan Soto, 1973
- El huesped, las mascaras y otros disfraces, 1973
- Un decir, 1976
- En busca de J.I. de Diego Pandro, 1990

== See also ==
- List of Puerto Rican writers
- List of Puerto Ricans
- Puerto Rican literature
