= Joseph Skerrett =

Joseph T. Skerrett (1943 – July 25, 2015) was an American literary critic and professor of English at the University of Massachusetts Amherst. Much of his work centers on black studies, and his best-known book is the 2001 anthology Literature, Race and Ethnicity: Contesting American Identities. With Amritjit Singh and Robert E. Hogan, he also edited two books on Memory in Ethnic American Literature in 1994 and 1996 respectively.

Skerrett was born in Brooklyn, New York, in 1943, and earned a bachelor's degree at Saint Francis College in 1964. He then earned an M.A. in creative writing at Johns Hopkins University in 1965, and a Ph.D. in English at Yale University. His work at Yale focused on 20th century African-American literature.

Skerrett joined the University of Massachusetts, Amherst English Department in 1973. From 1986 to 1999, Skerrett edited the journal, MELUS: Multi-Ethnic Literature of the United States, which brought attention to a diversity of American literatures, and their "interfaces."

== Publications ==
- Editor, Literature, Race and Ethnicity: Contesting American Identities (Longman, 2001)
- Editor, MELUS (journal)
- Co-Editor (with Amritjit Singh and Robert E. Hogan), Memory, Narrative and Identity: New Essays in Ethnic American Literatures. Boston: Northwestern UP, 1994
- Co-Editor (with Amritjit Singh and Robert E. Hogan), Memory and Cultural Politics: New Approaches to American Ethnic Literatures Boston: Northeastern U P, 1996.

== Awards ==
- UMass Chancellor's Award for Multiculturalism, 1996
- Honorary Doctorate of Literature, Saint Francis College, Brooklyn, New York, 1998
