= Elizam Escobar =

Puerto Rican writer and painter (1948–2021)

- Born: May 24, 1948; Ponce, Puerto Rico
- Died: January 15, 2021 (aged 72); Hato Rey, Puerto Rico
- Education: University of Puerto Rico
- Known for: Painting
- Notable work: Los sepultureros (1985); El velorio (1991); El embalsamador y la viuda (2001)
- Awards: Pen Club prize of creative essays
- Patrons: Museo de Arte de Puerto Rico, Museo de Arte de Ponce
- Website: www.elizamescobar.com

Elizam Escobar (May 24, 1948 – January 15, 2021) was a Puerto Rican art theorist, poet, visual artist and writer. He served a lengthy prison sentence after being convicted while a member of the FALN.

== Early years ==
Escobar was born in Puerto Rico's second largest city, Ponce, Puerto Rico, on the southern part of the island. There he received his primary and secondary education. As a child, he always enjoyed drawing and painting. After Escobar graduated from high school he enrolled and attended the University of Puerto Rico to pursue his artistic studies.

== Political activist ==
During his years as a student, he became actively involved in the Puerto Rican independence movement. He became a member of the underground group called Fuerzas Armadas de Liberación Nacional (FALN). After he earned his bachelor's degree in Visual Arts, he moved to New York City. In New York he attended the City College of New York. Escobar also taught art at the Museo del Barrio's School of the Arts from 1979 to 1980.

On 4 April 1980, Escobar was among eleven FALN members arrested by the FBI in Evanston, Illinois, under the suspicion of plotting to bomb Federal installations. They were charged with seditious conspiracy and related charges. During and after the trial he maintained his position that he and the others were prisoners of war. Escobar was sentenced to a prison term of 68 years which was to be served in the federal prison of El Reno, Oklahoma. On 7 September 1999, Escobar and the ten other prisoners who were arrested with him were granted clemency by President Bill Clinton. Escobar returned to Puerto Rico immediately upon his release.

== Artistic work ==
During his incarceration, Escobar used his free time to produce much of his art work. He also wrote about art and his theories about art were published in journals like Rethinking Marxism, Third Text and Left Curve. Escobar argued against the use of art as political propaganda and was in favor of artistic autonomy. While serving his prison term, a series of his art work, which he titled Art as an Act of Liberation, was exhibited in the following galleries:

- The Axe Street Arena
- Galeria Kalpulli
- Polvo, Chicago
- Casa de Arte y Cultura/Calles y Sueños, Chicago
- Rafael Cintrón-Ortiz Cultural Center, Chicago
- ABC No Rio Gallery, New York City
- The Dissident Voices Gallery, Philadelphia
- Museo de Arte de Ponce

Among his better known works are Los sepultureros (1985), El velorio (1991), and El embalsamador y la viuda (2001).

Among the magazines which have published his works are: Beginnings, Currents, Left Curve, De Pie y En Lucha and Polvo. His poems have been published in the Anthology of Latino Poets in New York. In 2013, he presented his new book "Anti-diario de Prisión: El beso del pensamiento" and displayed at Centro Cultural Carmen Solá de Pereira.

== Later years ==
Escobar was the Dean of the Painting Department at the Escuela de Artes Plásticas de Puerto Rico in San Juan, Puerto Rico. His paintings have been exhibited in New York, Chicago, Philadelphia and at the Institute of Puerto Rican Culture. He has authored two books, "Speech in the Night" and "Sonia Semenovena", published by Quinera editors.

== Honors ==
Elizam Escobar is honored at Ponce's Park of the Illustrious Ponce Citizens. In 2016 "La Campechada", celebration in honor of Jose Campeche, Puerto Rican painter of the 18th century, considered one of the most important painters of his era, was dedicated to Elizam Escobar. He was also honored at the 2021 Feria de Artesanías de Ponce "for having, for decades, left the mark of revolutionary ideals in his works."

== See also ==
- Oscar López Rivera
- List of Puerto Rican writers
- List of Puerto Ricans
- Puerto Rican literature
- List of people pardoned or granted clemency by the president of the United States
