= Zoé Jiménez Corretjer =

Puerto Rican writer

Zoé Jiménez Corretjer is an author from Puerto Rico. She is a professor in the Department of Humanities, University of Puerto Rico at Humacao. Also known as her artistic name: Zoé Ximénez.

== Life ==
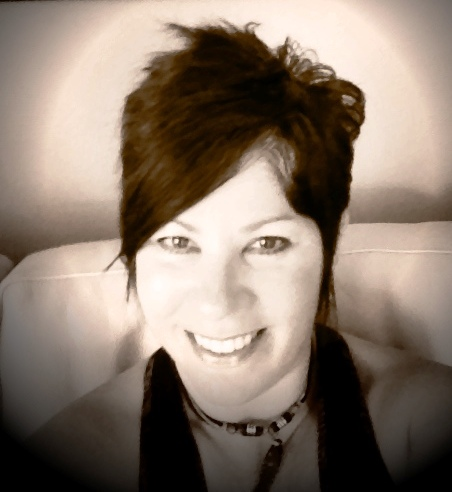
Zoé Jiménez Corretjer

Jiménez Corretjer was born in San Juan, Puerto Rico. She has a Doctorate Degree from Temple University in Philadelphia and has taken several professional seminars at the Universidad Complutense in Madrid, Spain, and at the Ateneo de Madrid. She is also a licensed psychologist in Puerto Rico.

Since 1996, she has taught literature and humanities at the University of Puerto Rico, where she worked as director of The Journal of Humanistic Studies and Literature until 2017. She served as External Evaluator for the Department of Modern Languages for the University of Hong Kong and was part the bibliographers group for modern for the Modern Language Association, where she worked on creating and adding bibliography for the MLA Bibliographical Index. She is currently a Full Professor at the University of Puerto Rico and maintains a private psychology practice. She is also a curriculum specialist and has developed university courses and programs, as well as continuing education courses for health professionals seeking licensure renewal.

Jiménez-Corretjer belongs to a literary tradition in Puerto Rico. Some of her contributions to literature are the Theory of the Feminine Fantastic, a new aesthetical and theoretical terminology used now in literary research. She has published fifteen books. Her creative works have been added to several literary anthologies and academic books and its consider to be part of the group of writers that conform the "Puerto Rican Generation of the Eighties". Her book published by Ediciones Puerto is the first about the aesthetics and philosophical ideas in the poetry of José María Lima.

Under the artistic name Zoé Ximénez, Jiménez Corretjer has released musical adaptations of her poems, which are available on streaming platforms such as Spotify, Amazon Music, YouTube and her official website. Her two recent albums in 2026 are: El amor habita en los bolsillos and El desierto entró en mí.

== Publications ==
Jiménez Corretjer has published books of poetry, short stories, fiction, and academic essays.:

- Las menos cuarto (Madrid, 1985)
- Crónicas Interplanetarias (Interplanetary Chronicles) (1991)
- Poemanaciones (1992)
- Cuentos de una bruja (2000)
- El Fantástico Femenino en España y América (The Fantastic Feminine in Spain and America) (2001)
- La mano que escribe: Literatura, Arte y Pensamiento (The Writing Hand: Literature, Art and Thought) (2007)
- Cánticos del Lago (Canticles of the Lake) (2007)
- Antigua Vía (Ancient Way) (2007)
- Sala de Espera (Waiting Room) (2007)
- Rosa Náutica (Nautic Rose) (Madrid: Torremozas, 2008)
- Puerto Nube (Terranova Editores, 2008)
- Las Camelias de Amelia (Fiction, 2009)
- Lógicas del Extravío: Anatomía Existencial en la poesía de José María Lima (Ediciones Puerto, 2010)
- La Boca de la Verdad (Edibom, 2010)
- Tempo Antico (Edibom Edizioni, Italy 2010) (Translations of her works to Italian)
- Rascacielos(Casa de los Poetas Editores, San Juan, 2011)
- El Cantar de la Memoria(Casa de los Poetas, 2012)
- Arcadia (Lobo Bueno, 2025)
- Hayat (Lobo Bueno, 2025)

She has been included in several anthologies. Two of them are the Antología de Poesía Puertorriqueña compiled by Mercedes López Baralt and the Antología de Poesía Latinoamericana del Siglo XXI edited by Julio Ortega. Jiménez-Corretjer has also contributed writing scripts for the television program En la punta de la lengua.

== Awards ==
Jiménez Corretjer obtained the Francisco Matos Paoli First Poetry Medal from the University of Puerto Rico in 1986. She received in 2008 the National Essay Award 2007 from the Pen Club of Puerto Rico for her book La mano que escribe: Literatura, Arte y Pensamiento. This is one of the most prestigious awards in literature on the island. Lógicas del Extravío, also won an award from the Pen Club and the Institute of Puerto Rican Culture.

== See also ==
- List of Puerto Rican writers
- List of Puerto Ricans
- Puerto Rican literature
