= Bernardo Vega (writer) =

Puerto Rican immigrant, writer, and community leader

- Born: 1885; Cayey, Puerto Rico
- Died: 1965 (aged 79–80); San Juan, Puerto Rico
- Occupation: writer

Bernardo Vega (1885–1965) was a Puerto Rican immigrant that contributed to the understanding of the Puerto Rican community in New York City. He played a pivotal role in bringing together the Hispanic population by writing for Spanish newspapers and his involvement in politics. His most famous work Memoirs of Bernardo Vega was published in 1977 and detailed the lives and struggles of the new immigrants from Puerto Rico to New York City. The Memoir is considered to be an important piece of Puerto Rican literature, because of its accounts regarding how Puerto Ricans adjusted to a new culture and life in the United States.

== Early life and migration ==
Bernardo Vega was born in 1885 in Cayey, Puerto Rico. Cayey was a town known for tobacco, where tabaqueros, also known as cigar-makers, would work to grow it. Vega was a tabaquero, which was, to the working class, an intellectual job because during their work someone would read to them. This eventually led Vega to finding jobs of this same caliber in New York. He moved there in 1916. He was a strong advocator for better working conditions and rights, as well as a member of the Puerto Rican socialist labor movement.

Vega got married in 1918 and had two children, but later divorced and remarried again in 1929.

== New York City and Memoirs of Bernardo Vega ==
When Vega first arrived to New York City in 1916, the Puerto Rican population was only a few thousand. Many of these migrants came from the cigar making profession in Puerto Rico and Cuba. This led to employment for many of these migrants at cigar-making shops or other factories, where their tabaquero skills were used.

An advocate for workers’ rights while living in Puerto Rico, he continued his involvement in the community by buying Gráfico, a Spanish newspaper in 1927. Vega used this newspaper to bring together the Hispanic community that was scattered in New York at the time. He wrote about the problems that Puerto Ricans faced in reference to politics, economics, and society. This is where he began to write memoirs, detailing accounts of Puerto Rican life in the United States.

His most famous work Memoirs of Bernardo Vega was published in 1977, years after his death, but he had written it sometime in the 1940s. The book starts when Antonio Vega, Bernardo's uncle, came to New York in 1857. It did not focus on Vega himself, but Puerto Ricans' perspective as a whole. He also talked about the colonia, a reference to a section of New York City that was heavily populated by Puerto Ricans, along with the culture and society there. It was seen as an important place for immigrants who had come to New York City, forming a community. The book mentioned the role of Puerto Ricans and how they interacted with politics, social life, and the American culture, as well as problems of discrimination and poverty that Puerto Ricans faced in the city. It is seen as instrumental for understanding and displaying the lives of Puerto Rican migrants in the late 19th century and into the 1940s. The evolution of these communities over time is shown by the influx of more Puerto Ricans to the city.

== Legacy ==
Bernardo Vega died in 1965 in San Juan, Puerto Rico, before his memoir was published. Twelve years later Memoirs of Bernardo Vega was published in Spanish and then translated to English in 1984. His work is considered to be an important piece for Puerto Rican literature because of its historical accounts.
