= Jaime Carrero =

Jaime Carrero (1931–2013) was a Puerto Rican painter, draftsman, novelist, playwright and poet.
