= Ernesto Quiñonez =

American novelist

- Born: 1965 (age 60–61); Ecuador
- Occupations: Novelist, professor
- Children: 1
- Writing career
- Genres: Fiction, non-fiction, journalism
- Notable works: Bodega Dreams (2000); Chango's Fire (2004); Taína (2019)

Ernesto Quiñonez (born 1965) is an Ecuadorian-Puerto Rican novelist. His work received the Barnes & Noble Discover Great New Writers designation, the Borders Bookstore Original New Voice selection, and was declared a "Notable Book of the Year" by The New York Times and the Los Angeles Times. Quiñonez is an associate professor at Cornell University.

== Work ==
Quiñonez's first novel, Bodega Dreams, was published in 2000. The New York Times declared it "a New Immigrant Classic" and "a stark evocation of life in the projects of El Barrio ... the story he tells has energy and nerve." Time announced that "Quiñonez knows this 'hood--readers may have to remind themselves that this is a work of fiction and not a memoir. His prose, detailed and passionate, brings the tale to life."

In Quiñonez's second novel, Chango's Fire (2004), the protagonist, Julio Santana, is an intelligent high-school dropout who moonlights as an arsonist. The Washington Post declared that Chango's Fire "succeeds in its rich characterizations of the people of the barrio, led by Julio, whose complexity and sensitivity carry the story." The El Paso Times praised Quiñonez's "extraordinary ability to detail, and nurture, and then unveil complex emotions in his characters. For any reader who wants to believe in a difficult protagonist, and appreciate the reality of El Barrio beyond facile stereotypes, this book is essential." Kirkus Reviews criticized the characters and situations in Chango's Fire for lack of believably but hailed "Quiñonez's ingeniously detailed revelations of how people cheat and improvise, to survive in an impoverished and dangerous racist environment. This is an author who knows his material." Booklist heralded it as a "searing portrait of a community at the tipping point ... Quiñonez ably illuminates the sordid politics of gentrification and the unexpected places new immigrants turn to for social and spiritual support."

The Wall Street Journal declared that Quiñonez's third novel, Taina (2019), "Though... far more modest in scope... has the same complicated intimacy with the neighborhood and its history as Bodega Dreams."

Quiñonez is a Story Teller for The Moth and a Sundance Writers Lab fellow and last appeared in the "Blackout" episode of PBS's American Experience.

== Bibliography ==
=== Novels ===
- Bodega Dreams (2000)
- Chango's Fire (2004)
- Taina (2019)

=== Essays ===
- "The White Baby", The New York Times, June 6, 2000
- "Dog Days", The New York Times Magazine, November 26, 2000
- "Counting The Ways", The New York Times Magazine, November 11, 2001
- "Y Tu Black Mama, Tambien?", Newsweek, June 12, 2003
- "Catcalling", Newsweek, August 14, 2001
- "The Fires Last Time", The New York Times; December 18, 2000.
- "The Diaper Caper and Small Dog Scam", The New York Times, July 8, 2007
- "The Black and Brown Divide", Esquire, July 2008
