= José Luis González (writer) =

Puerto Rican author and essayist (1926–1996)

- Born: March 8, 1926; Santo Domingo, Dominican Republic
- Died: December 8, 1996 (aged 70); Mexico City, Mexico
- Occupations: Short story writer, novelist, essayist
- Writing career
- Notable works: Puerto Rico: The Four-Storeyed Country and Other Essays (1980) Ballad of Another Time (1978)

José Luis González (March 8, 1926 – December 8, 1996) was a Puerto Rican Marxist essayist, novelist, short story writer, university professor, and journalist who lived most of his life in exile in Mexico due to his pro-independence political views. He is considered to be one of the most important Puerto Rican authors of the 20th century, particularly for his book Puerto Rico: The Four-Storeyed Country and Other Essays, which was first published in Spanish in 1980.

== Biography ==
José Luis González Coiscou was born in the Dominican Republic, the son of a Puerto Rican father and Dominican mother. His family left the country and moved to Puerto Rico after the dictator Rafael Leónidas Trujillo assumed power in 1930. González was raised in Puerto Rico and went on to obtain a Bachelor's degree in political science at the University of Puerto Rico, Rio Piedras Campus. He also studied in the United States, and received a master's degree and Doctorate in Philosophy and Letters at the National Autonomous University of Mexico. A renowned Marxist, González always considered himself to be a Puerto Rican, but lived in Mexico from 1953 until his death in 1996 and obtained Mexican citizenship in 1955, renouncing his American citizenship to do so. He lectured at the UNAM on Latin American literature and on the sociology of literature. He also worked as a newspaper correspondent in Prague, Berlin, Paris and Warsaw during his lifetime.

== Awards ==
José Luis González was awarded the Xavier Villaurrutia award in 1978 for his novel Ballad of Another Time, and also received two national awards in Puerto Rico.

== Puerto Rico: The Four-Storeyed Country ==
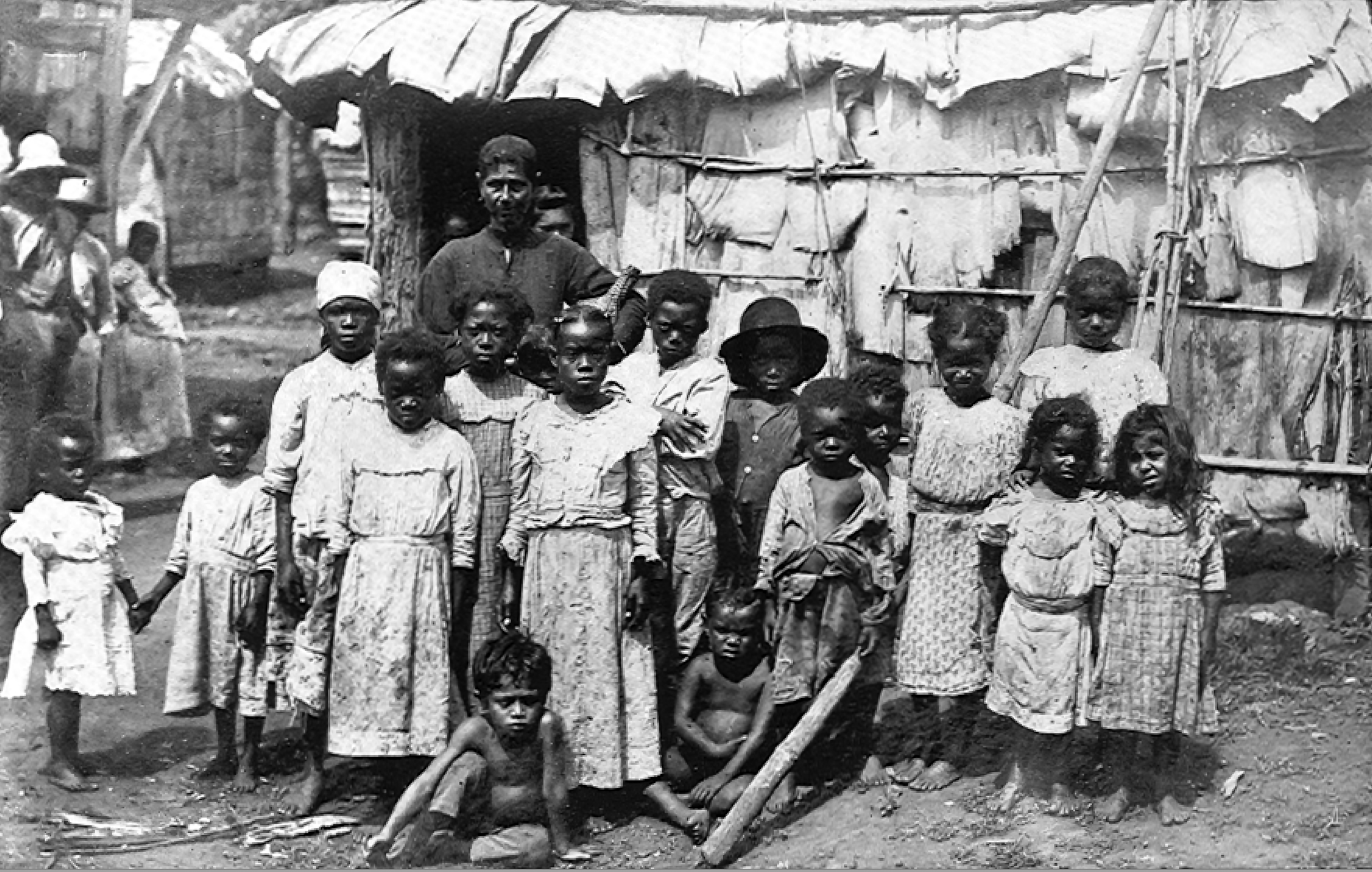
Porto Rican Peones (Puerto Rican Peons-- Children)

José Luis González published the original Spanish essay "El País De Cuatro Pisos" within a collection of seven essays in 1980 under the Edition stamp Hurricane, Inc. in San Juan, Puerto Rico. The English translation, Puerto Rico: The Four-Storeyed Country was published on April 1, 1990 by Waterfront Press.The book consists of seven essays, all varying in length and focus. José Luis González wrote The Four-Storeyed Country in response to a conversation of Puerto Ricans and their relationship with independence. Additionally, The Four Storeyed Country was also written to answer the question posed by one of his students in 1979 during one of his Latin American Studies seminars, "How do you think the Puerto Rican culture has been affected by the North American colonial intervention and how do you see it?" José Luis González begins by arguing that every society has two cultures, the oppressors and those who are oppressed, which he refers to as elite culture and popular culture. Traditionally, the national culture is going to be the dominant one. In Puerto Rican history, even the elite culture has been dominated by another culture. To illustrate this approach, the author compares the layered and complex history of Puerto Rico to that of four floors in a building.

=== First Story ===
The first story developed from 1520 to 1820 and focuses on the impact of the African slaves imported to Puerto Rico. González contends that the first true people to identify themselves as Puerto Ricans, omitting from consideration the aboriginal Taíno, were the enslaved Africans and their children, sold to Spanish colonists early in the island's Post-Columbian history. This is when the first dialectical relationship is born. Interrelations between the dominated islanders—enslaved Black people, freed Black people, descendants of slaves and Indigenous people, and the white peasantry, and the dominant islanders—white descendants of born Spaniards on the island,. had relations which led to what González refers to as popular and mixed culture, primarily Afro-Antillean. In this relationship, by the eighteenth century, the advances of the majority dominated sector stood out. The author points out that the Puerto Rican society, or popular culture, had evolved from then on forward and the national culture at the time would be that popular culture.

=== Second Story ===
The second story is characterized by two great waves of migration. The coffee plantation owners of the nineteenth century. These plantation owners arrived under the special concessions afforded by the Royal Decree of Graces of 1815. The Royal Decree of Graces of 1815 otherwise known as the Cédula de Gracia de 1815 was a legal order approved by the Spanish Crown in the early half of the 19th century to encourage Spaniards and, later, Europeans of non-Spanish origin, to settle in and populate the colony of Puerto Rico. The first stage developed from 1810–1820 and consisted of refugees from the Spanish-American wars of independence. The second stage (1840–1860) consisted of several migratory waves in which came Corsicans, Catalans, Canaries, among others, attracted by the promises of land and economic benefits.

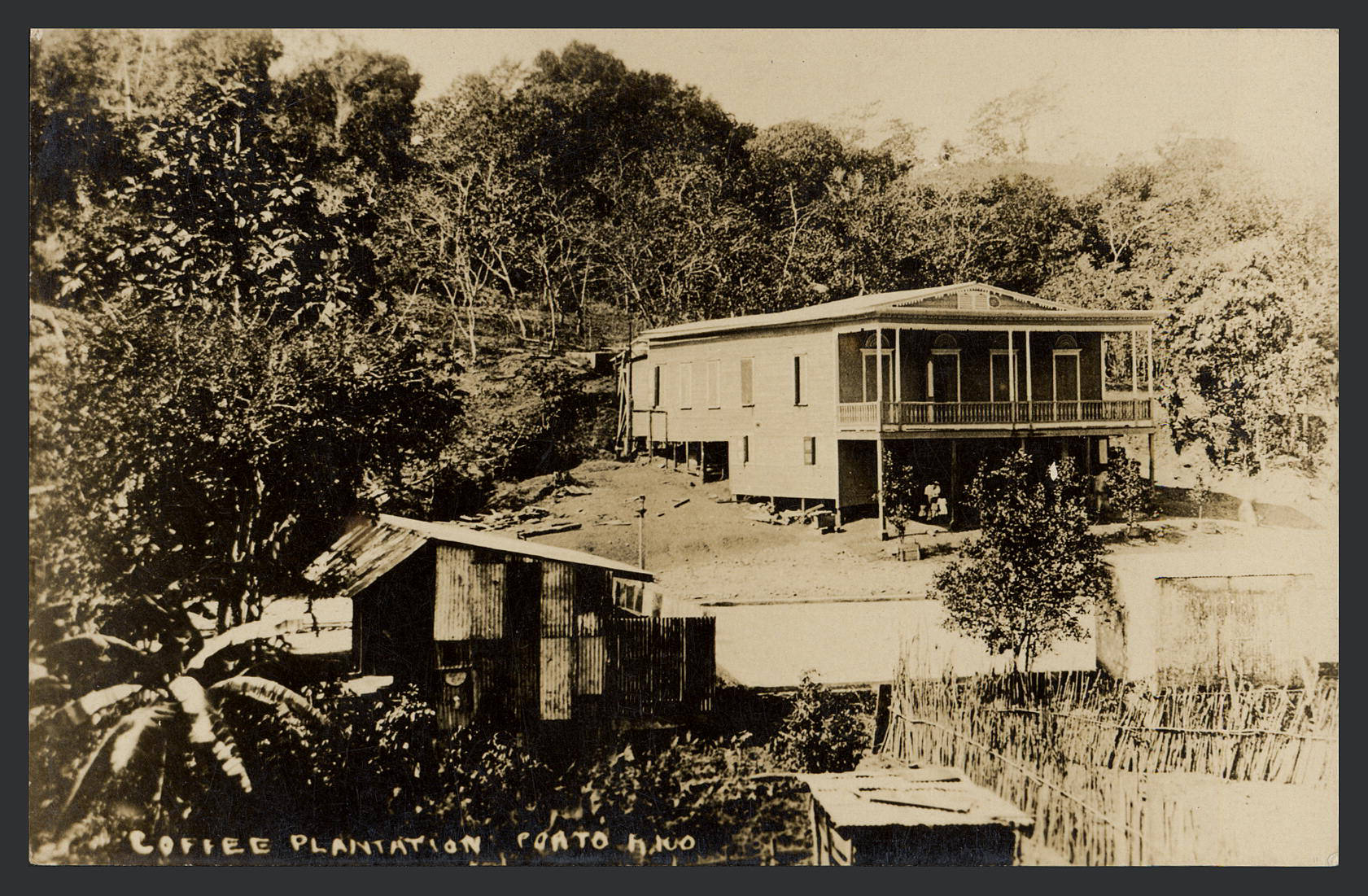
Coffee Plantation, Puerto Rico

=== Third Story ===
The third story was of townspeople–professionals, managers and bureaucrats brought upon from the American Invasion in Puerto Rico. González catalogs a society so split racially, socially and economically that we should rather talk about two nations. The Puerto Rican culture at the time of the invasion was a divided culture of the dominant and the dominated. The Spanish–American War did not allow an opportunity for the divided culture to merge, or to mature their mutual relations. The Invasion held a different meaning for each social class. The Puerto Rican working class welcomed the invaders with the hope of annexation and with it the establishment of a new social order, full of freedom, democracy and a progressive economy.

=== Fourth Story ===
The fourth story, from 1950s to 1980s discusses the modernization of Puerto Rico through American involvement. Though industrialization created a lot of jobs it was not enough to employ the majority of the island. Thousands of agricultural jobs were lost after Puerto Rico industrialized and traditional companies that export sugar, tobacco, and coffee were collapsing. Puerto Ricans were forced to migrate to the United States, mostly in New York where they were discriminated. The Puerto Rican migration to New York City manifested with the rising unemployment rates and rapid marginalization of Puerto Ricans. The standard of living grew, as a result pushing Puerto Ricans out of the island in search for jobs. For the first time Puerto Ricans were granted the right to vote for their representatives. Additionally, they were given the right to their own constitution. These situations greatly enhanced Puerto Rico's dependency to its colonizers. González suggests that democratic socialism is the only way to rebuild Puerto Rican society and embrace the English language as a step into a new and united national culture.

=== Reaction within Puerto Rican culture ===
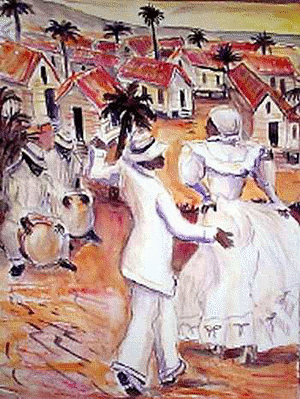
Baile De Loiza Aldea

The implications posed by José Luis González were controversial among Puerto Rican communities. It "set off a frenzied debate on Puerto Rican society and cultures, now gaining in vehemence with the growing importance of Afro-American, Mestizo, and Caribbean cultures in the United States". González dismantles the myth of a dominant Spanish and racially white national culture in Puerto Rican history. He claims that the national identity is primarily Mestizo with a significant contribution from Africa. González calls the African slaves and Mestizo peasantry the first Puerto Ricans because they were the first inhabitants who had to make the island their home. Most Puerto Ricans deny the black heritage of the island and idealize the Spanish colonial era. José Luis González conveys the difficulties Puerto Ricans face after their displacement, as "the effort that takes adapt to another lifestyle and play another role within society to obtain sustenance daily". The stories give a representation that accounts for its geographical area and focuses on the issues of injustice and poverty, as well as to make visible the consequences in those who suffer them. González's piece resonated with the people of Puerto Rico because his stories gave truth to what was happening. "He was able to capture the first criollismo touches that Puerto Rico knew". If the Puerto Rican society would have evolved from then on in the same way that other islands of the Caribbean, our current 'national culture' would be that popular culture of that time. Puerto Ricans after reading González's work can feel pride within their nationality, culture, and personality but they must accept that their culture comes from within American culture. Accordingly, the conversation about independence movements is impacted by González's work. "We are at a crucial moment in our history as people. A crucial moment which is more than a moment to determine our political condition. It is a moment crucial because it is time to rebuild the Puerto Rican society … but not backward, to the past … but forward, toward a future that relies on the tradition of the popular masses, rediscover and rescue the essential Caribbean of our collective identity. We must understand that the natural destiny of Puerto Rico is the same as all other insular and continental people of the Caribbean".

== Works ==
=== Fiction ===
- En la sombra. Prologue by Carmen Alicia Cadilla. San Juan, Puerto Rico: Imp. Venezuela, 1943.
- Cinco cuentos de sangre. Prologue by Francisco Matos Paoli. San Juan, Puerto Rico: Imp. Venezuela, 1945.
- El hombre en la calle. Santurce: Puerto Rico, Bohique, 1948.
- Paisa —un relato de la emigración—. Prologue by Luis Enrique Délano. México: Fondo de Cultura Popular, 1950.
- En este lado. México: Los Presentes, 1954.
- La galería y otros cuentos. México: Era, 1972.
- Mambrú se fue a la guerra (y otros relatos). México: Joaquín Mortiz, 1972
  - excerpt (in German) Dunkle Nacht. (La noche en que volvimos a ser gente) in Ein neuer Name, ein fremdes Gesicht. 26 Erzählungen aus Lateinamerika. Sammlung Luchterhand, 834. Neuwied, 1987, pp 274-290
- Cuento de cuentos y once más. México: Extemporáneos, 1973.
- En Nueva York y otras desgracias. Prologue by Ángel Rama. México: Siglo XXI, 1973.
- Veinte cuentos y Paisa. Prologue by Pedro Juan Soto. Río Piedras, Puerto Rico: Cultural, 1973.
- Balada de otro tiempo. Rio Piedras, Puerto Rico: Ediciones Huracán, 1978.
- El oído de Dios. Río Piedras, Puerto Rico: Cultural, 1984.
- Las caricias del tigre. México, Joaquín Mortiz, 1984.
- Antología personal. Río Piedras, Puerto Rico: Editorial de la Universidad de Puerto Rico, 1990.
- Todos los cuentos. México, U.N.A.M., 1992.

=== Essays and Memoirs ===
- El país de cuatro pisos y otros ensayos. Río Piedras, Puerto Rico: Huracán, 1980.
- La luna no era de queso: Memorias de infancia. Río Piedras, Puerto Rico: Cultural, 1988.
- Literatura y sociedad de Puerto Rico: De los cronistas de Indias a la Generación del 98. México: Fondo de Cultura Económica, 1976.
- Nueva visita al cuarto piso. Madrid: Flamboyán, 1986.

== See also ==
- Dominican immigration to Puerto Rico
- List of Puerto Ricans
- List of Puerto Rican writers
- Puerto Rican literature
