= Abraham Rodriguez (novelist) =

American novelist

Abraham Rodriguez Jr. (born in The Bronx, 1960) is a Puerto Rican novelist, short story author and musician who writes in English about the experience of Latinos in the United States. Although he has been living in Germany since the mid-90s, Rodriguez continues to set his stories in the South Bronx. He is part of the Nuyorican Movement.

As a musician, he is the founding member, guitarist and singer for the Berlin-based punk-rock band Urgent Fury.

== Life ==
His work has appeared in Story, Best Stories from New Writers, Chattahoochie Review, Alternative Fiction & Poetry, and Latino Boom: An Anthology of U.S. Latino Literature.

== Awards ==
- 1993 New York Times Notable Book of the Year, for The Boy Without A Flag
- 1995 American Book Award, for Spidertown
- 2000 New York Foundation for the Arts grant
- New York State Council of the Arts, literary panel member

== Bibliography ==
- The Boy Without A Flag. Milkweed Editions. 1992. ISBN 978-0-915943-74-6.
- Spidertown. Penguin Books. 1994. ISBN 978-0-14-023838-9.
- The Buddha Book. Macmillan. 2001. ISBN 978-0-312-26299-0.
- South by South Bronx. Akashic Books. 2008. ISBN 978-1-933354-56-9.
