= The Society for the Study of the Multi-Ethnic Literature of the United States =

American scholarly society

The Society for the Study of the Multi-Ethnic Literature of the United States (MELUS) is a scholarly society established in 1974. MELUS publishes a quarterly academic journal, MELUS. The aim of the Society is "to expand the definition of American literature through the study and teaching of Latino American, Native American, African-American, Asian and Pacific American, and ethnically specific Euro-American literary works, their authors, and their cultural contexts".

== Founding ==
The society was formed in response to the perceived practice at the Modern Language Association's annual conference American Literature section of discussing only works by white men. The society was founded at the following year's conference and within a few months had almost 100 members. At the conference the following year (1974), society members formally proclaimed their demand, "We must expand the canon of American literature!" At this time, the society's goals included the recovery of lost works by minority authors, the compilation of bibliographies of minority literature, and the enlisting of the aid of ethnic studies scholars in all fields, as well as publishing book reviews, connecting scholars, and printing abstracts on ethnic studies dissertations.

== Present ==
The Society organizes sessions at the conventions of such scholarly organizations as the Modern Language Association and its Regionals, College English Association, National Women's Studies Association, American Studies Association, American Literature Association, and Popular Culture Association". The current president is Wenying Xu (Florida Atlantic University).

== Journal ==
MELUS
- Discipline: Literature, ethnic studies
- Language: English
- Edited by: Gary Totten

Publication details
- History: 1974-present
- Publisher: Oxford University Press on behalf of The Society for the Study of the Multi-Ethnic Literature of the United States (United States)
- Frequency: Quarterly

Standard abbreviations
- ISO 4: MELUS

Indexing
- ISSN: 0163-755X (print); 1946-3170 (web)
- LCCN: 79642925
- JSTOR: 0163755X
- OCLC no.: 50709793

Links
- Journal homepage; Online access; Online archive; Project MUSE

MELUS is a quarterly peer-reviewed academic journal, covering multicultural literary studies. Most issues are thematically organized. The founding editor-in-chief was Katharine D. Newman, who was succeeded by Joseph T. Skerrett, Jr., then by Veronica Makowsky, Martha J. Cutter, and, most recently, by Gary Totten. The journal is supported by dues of Society members, library subscriptions, and funds from patrons.

=== Abstracting and indexing ===
The journal is abstracted and indexed in:

- MLA Bibliography
- Arts and Humanities Citation Index
- American Humanities Index
- International Bibliography of Periodical Literature
- International Bibliography of Book Reviews

== Annual conference ==
Since 1987, the society has sponsored themed conferences in various locations around the United States. These conferences feature "panels, workshops and round tables on all aspects of the multi-ethnic literatures of the United States".
