= List of University of Puerto Rico, Rio Piedras people =

This list of University of Puerto Rico, Rio Piedras people includes alumni and faculty affiliated with the University of Puerto Rico, Rio Piedras, a public land-grant research university located in the Rio Piedras district of San Juan, Puerto Rico. It is a campus of the University of Puerto Rico system.

== Notable alumni ==
Alumni	Notability
Juan Mari Brás	advocate for Puerto Rican independence from the United States; founded the Puerto Rican Socialist Party
Norma Burgos	(B.A., M.P.A.) state senator, Puerto Rico Senate (since 2001)
Sila M. Calderón	(M.P.A.) 7th governor of Puerto Rico (2001–2005); mayor of San Juan, Puerto Rico (1997–2001)
Rafael Hernández Colón	4th governor of Puerto Rico (first term 1973–1977, second term 1985–1993); state senator, Puerto Rico Senate (1969–1973)
Julia de Burgos	(B.A. Education 1933) poet, journalist, advocate for Puerto Rico independence, and teacher
José Andreu García	(B.A. Economics 1958, J.D. 1961) jurist; former chief justice of the Supreme Court of Puerto Rico
Hans Hertell	former U.S. ambassador to the Dominican Republic
Enrique Laguerre	writer (including critic and poet), teacher
Luz Martinez-Miranda	physicist and professor at the University of Maryland; first female president of the National Society of Hispanic Physicists
Kenneth McClintock	Secretary of State of Puerto Rico, fulfilling the role of lieutenant governor (first-in-line of succession) in the U.S. territory
Edwin Irizarry Mora	economist, 2008 Puerto Rican Independence Party candidate for governor of Puerto Rico; professor, Department of Economics, University of Puerto Rico at Mayagüez
Jesús T. Piñero	first native Puerto Rican to be appointed governor of Puerto Rico by the government of the United States
Nellys Pimentel	Miss Earth 2019
Tania Ramos González	lecturer, poet, and columnist
Luisa R. Seijo Maldonado	(M.S.W. 1972) university professor, activist and social worker
Nydia Velázquez	(B.A. 1974) U.S. representative, D-New York (since 1993)
Aníbal Acevedo Vilá	(B.A. 1982, J.D. 1985) 8th governor of Puerto Rico (2005–2009); U.S. representative (resident commissioner), D-Puerto Rico (2001–2004); state representative, Puerto Rico House of Representatives (1992–1999)
Luis Castro Rivera	Olympian and men's high-jump coach; participated in the 2016 Rio and 2024 Paris Summer Olympic Games
José Miguel Agrelot	(B.A. 1949) Puerto Rican comedian and television host; his program, Su Alegre Despertar, won the Guinness World Record recognition for the longest-running daily radio program; namesake of the Puerto Rico event venue José Miguel Agrelot Coliseum ("El Choliseo")
Ada Monzón	(B.S. 1986) first female meteorologist in Puerto Rico; founder and president of the board of directors of the science museum Eco Exploratorio: Museo de Ciencias de Puerto Rico; chief meteorologist at WAPA-TV, Noticentro al Amanecer, WKAQ-580 am Univisión Radio, and Noticel; former professor at University of Puerto Rico, Río Piedras, worked in the field of mitigation at the Federal Emergency Management Agency (FEMA); former chief meteorologist at Univision Puerto Rico and WIPR-TV

== Notable faculty ==
Faculty	Notability
Luis López Álvarez	essayiat, novelist, poet; author of Los Comuneros
Grizelle González	ecologist at the Sabana Field Research Station
Ruben Berrios	president of the Puerto Rican Independence Party; former state senator; law professor at the University of Puerto Rico's Law School
Juan Ramon Jimenez	Spanish poet and writer; 1956 Nobel Prize in Literature laureate
Luce López-Baralt	professor of Spanish and comparative literature at the university
Fernando Picó	historian and Jesuit priest, leading expert on the history of Puerto Rico
Pedro Juan Soto	writer
Rexford Tugwell	served as the last appointed American governor of Puerto Rico, 1941–1946; former chancellor of the University of Puerto Rico
