= University High School (San Juan) =

College preparatory high school operated by the University of Puerto Rico

Coordinates: 18°24′3″N 66°2′59″W

- San Juan, Puerto Rico

Information
- Established: 1913
- Director: Ana Jimenez
- Enrollment: 514
- Colors: Red, white
- Mascot: Rooster
- Website: uhs.upr.edu

The University High School, (Spanish: Escuela Secundaria de la Universidad de Puerto Rico) commonly referred to by its initials "UHS", in San Juan, Puerto Rico is a college preparatory laboratory high school operated by the Faculty of Education of the University of Puerto Rico. Located on the University of Puerto Rico, Río Piedras Campus, it provides education to approximately 514 students from 7th to 12th grade.

== Campus ==
Its main building is a century-old art deco building located on Gándara Avenue and includes a three-story classroom annex designed in the 1970s by architect George McClintock, along with a roofed basketball court pavilion and school lunch cafeteria building (also designed by McClintock in the 1970s) shared with the UPR Elementary School.

== Curriculum ==
UHS's faculty is composed of University of Puerto Rico professors. Students who have fulfilled their general education requirements are allowed to take college-level courses at UPR's Río Piedras campus and all students are allowed to use the José M. Lázaro general library and other campus facilities.The UHS's curriculum is one of the most complex and hard of the country. UHS students have breakfast and lunch at the Lunchroom belonging to the University Elementary School, located next to the UHS.

== Student organizations ==
UHS has a student council alongside several organized clubs such as a Spanish Oratory club, a Model United Nations club, an English Forensics League Club, a National Honors Society chapter, among others.

== Sports ==
UHS has several sports teams, including a soccer team, a volleyball team, swimming team and a basketball team.

== 2017 University of Puerto Rico strikes ==
The University High School joined the University of Puerto Rico strikes on March 28, 2017. The strike was ended after a vote was held during a student assembly on May 13.

== Notable alumni ==
- Enrique Martínez Celaya, contemporary Cuban-born painter, sculptor, author and former physicist.
- Justino Diaz, operatic bass-baritone.
- Carmen Yulín Cruz, former senator and former mayor of San Juan, Puerto Rico
- Alexandra Lúgaro, independent gubernatorial candidate
- Rafael Quintero, diver.
- Hector Luis Acevedo, former mayor of San Juan and gubernatorial candidate
- José Andreu García, former Chief Justice of the Supreme Court of Puerto Rico
- Julia de Burgos, Puerto Rican poet
- Severo Colberg Toro, senator
- Alex Cora, former MLB player, current manager of the Boston Red Sox
- Juan Manuel García Passalacqua, late political analyst
- Velda González, former Senate Vice President, actress
- Miguel Hernandez Agosto, former senator and president of the senate
- Julio Kaplan, 1967 P.R. National Chess Champion, computer scientist, founder CEO Heuristic Software
- Luz Martinez-Miranda, physicist and professor at the University of Maryland; first female president of the National Society of Hispanic Physicists
- Kenneth McClintock, Former PR Secretary of State and Senate President
- Ricky Melendez, singer (Menudo)
- Victoria Muñoz Mendoza, former senator and gubernatorial candidate
- Marco A. Rigau, former senator
- José M. Saldaña, Puerto Rican academic and former UPR President
- Roberto Sánchez Ramos, former PR Attorney General
- Marcos Zurinaga, film director
