= Whendee Silver =

American ecologist and biochemist

- Education: MS in Forest Science from Yale School of Forestry in 1987 PhD from Yale University in 1992
- Awards: Fellow, Ecological Society of America Innovation Award, American Carbon Registry Aldo Leopold Leadership Fellow
- Scientific career
- Fields: ecosystem ecology, biogeochemistry
- Website: https://nature.berkeley.edu/silverlab/

Whendee Silver is an American ecosystem ecologist and biogeochemist.

== Early life and education ==
Silver grew up in Southern California. She earned her MS in Forest Science from Yale School of Forestry in 1987 and in 1992, received her PhD from Yale University.

Silver earned a B.I.S. in Environmental Studies from the School for International Training in 1982, before completing her M.S. in Forest Science at the Yale School of Forestry and Environmental Studies in 1987 and her Ph.D. in Ecosystem Ecology at Yale University in 1992.

== Career and research ==
Silver is a distinguished professor of ecosystem ecology at the University of California, Berkeley. With a focus on ecosystem ecology and biogeochemistry, her research is often aimed at better understanding the soil system to mitigate the effects of climate change. A significant portion of her work has focused on tropical ecosystems, their soils, plants, and how nutrients and carbon cycle through them.

Silver is the lead scientist at the Marin Carbon Project, which she helped found in 2008. The Marin Carbon Project applies scientific research to land management and studies ecosystem services such as soil carbon sequestration. Through this project she is working with ranchers, using compost for carbon sequestration on ranch land in California, greatly improving the soil's ability to sequester carbon.

== Awards and honors ==
- Aldo Leopold Leadership Fellow, 2009.
- Google Science Communication Fellow, 2011.
- Innovation Award from the American Carbon Registry, 2015.
- UC Berkeley Faculty Climate Action Champion, 2015-2016.
- Fellow of the Ecological Society of America, 2016.
- ESPM Distinguished Faculty Lecturer, 2017
- Fellow, American Geophysical Union, 2021

== Publications ==
Silver's research on the biogeochemistry of tropical plants has been published in multiple academic journals. Silver's research was featured in the book Physiological Ecology of Tropical Plants by Ulrich Lüttge. Silver has over 145 publications as of 2018.

=== Selected publications ===
- Mayer, A., Z. Hausfather, A. D. Jones, and W. L. Silver. 2018. The Potential of Agricultural Land Management to Contribute to Lower Global Surface Temperatures. Sciences Advances. In Press.
- O'Connell, C., L. Ruan, and W.L. Silver. 2018. Drought drives rapid shifts in tropical rainforest soil biogeochemistry and greenhouse gas emissions. Nature Communications DOI: 10.1038/s41467-018-03352-3.
- Yang, W.H., R. Ryals, D.F. Cusack, and W.L. Silver. 2017. Cross-biome assessment of gross soil nitrogen cycling in California ecosystems. Soil Biology and Biochemistry107:144-155.
- McNicol, G., C.S. Sturtevant, S.H. Knox, I. Dronova, D.D. Baldocchi, and W. L.Silver. 2017. Effects of seasonality, transport-pathway, and spatial structure on restored wetland greenhouse gas fluxes. Global Change Biology DOI: 10.1111/gcb.13580.
- Ryals, R., V. T. Eviner, C. Stein, K. N. Suding, and W. L. Silver. 2016. Managing for multiple ecosystem services: are there tradeoffs between carbon sequestration, plant production and plant diversity in grasslands amended with compost? Ecosphere doi: 10.1002/ecs2.1270.
- Hall, S. J., J. Treffkorn, and W. L. Silver. 2014. Breaking the enzymatic latch: Impacts of reducing conditions on hydrolytic enzyme activity in tropical forest soils. Ecology95: 2964-2973.
- Liptzin, D. and W. L. Silver. 2015. Spatial patterns in oxygen and redox sensitive biogeochemistry in tropical forest soils. Ecosphere6: 1-14.
- Silver, W. L., S. J. Hall, and G. González. 2014. Differential effects of canopy trimming and litter deposition on litterfall and nutrient dynamics in a wet subtropical forest. Forest Ecology and Management332: 47-55.
