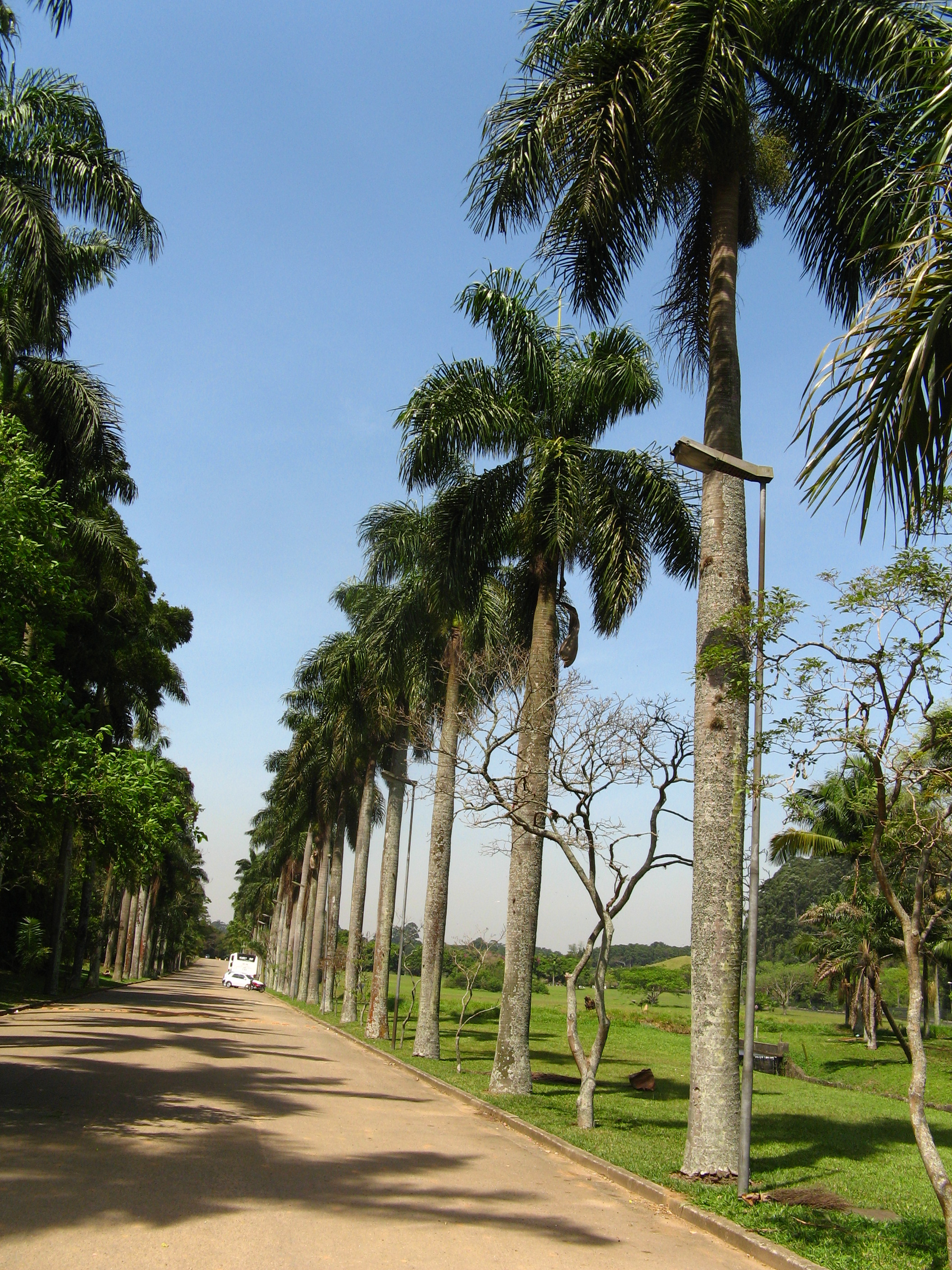
- In Botanical Garden of São Paulo, Brazil

Scientific classification
- Kingdom: Plantae
- Clade: Tracheophytes
- Clade: Angiosperms
- Clade: Monocots
- Clade: Commelinids
- Order: Arecales
- Family: Arecaceae
- Genus: Roystonea
- Species: R. borinquena

Binomial name
- Roystonea borinquena O.F.Cook

Synonyms
- Oreodoxa borinquena (O.F.Cook) Reasoner ex L.H.Bailey; Roystonea hispaniolana L.H.Bailey; Roystonea hispaniolana f. altissima Moscoso; Roystonea peregrina L.H.Bailey

= Roystonea borinquena =

Species of palm

Roystonea borinquena, commonly called the Puerto Rico royal palm (palma real puertorriqueña), is a species of palm which is native to Hispaniola (in both the Dominican Republic and Haiti), Puerto Rico and the Virgin Islands.

== Description ==
Roystonea borinquena is a large palm which usually reaches a height of 12 to 18 metres (40 to 60 ft), but individuals 26.4 m (87 ft) have been recorded. Stems are smooth and grey-brown to cinnamon-brown, and range from 25–70 centimetres (10–28 in) in diameter. Leaves are 2.4–3.7 m (7.9–12.1 ft) long, with short petioles and leaf sheathes 1–3 m (3.3–9.8 ft) long which encircles the upper portion of the stem, forming a crownshaft. The 1–1.4 m (3.3–4.6 ft) inflorescences bear creamy yellow male and female flowers; the anthers of the male flowers are bright purple. The fruit is single-seeded, about 13 millimetres (0.5 in) long and 10 mm (0.4 in) wide. The greenish-yellow immature fruit turn brownish-purple as they ripen.

== Taxonomy ==
Roystonea is placed in the subfamily Arecoideae and the tribe Roystoneae. The placement of Roystonea within the Arecoideae is uncertain; a 2006 phylogeny based on plastid DNA failed to resolve the position of the genus within the Arecoideae. As of 2008, there appeared to be no molecular phylogenetic studies of Roystonea and the relationship between R. borinquena and the rest of the genus is uncertain.

The species was first described by American botanist Orator F. Cook in 1901. For most of the 19th century, only two species of royal palms were generally recognized: Greater Antillean royal palms were considered Oreodoxa regia (now Roystonea regia), while Lesser Antillean ones were considered O. oleracea (R. oleracea). Due to problems with the way that the genus Oreodoxa had been applied by taxonomists, Cook proposed that the name Roystonea (in honor of American general Roy Stone) in 1900 be applied to the royal palms. The following year Cook described Roystonea borinquena.

=== Common names ===
Roystonea borinquena is known as the "mountain-cabbage", "Puerto Rico royal palm" or simply "royal palm" in English, palmiste in Haiti, palma real puertorriqueña, manacla, palma caruta, palma de cerdos, palma de grana, palma de yagua, palma real, yagua and other names in Puerto Rico and the Dominican Republic.

== Reproduction and growth ==
Young Roystonea borinquena trees may begin flowering when they are about seven years old, and they flower throughout the year. The flowers of Roystonea borinquena produce nectar and are visited by honey bees; and are thought to be insect-pollinated. Flowering individuals bear an average of 3.2 inflorescences per tree, and produce 6–12,000 fruit per inflorescence. Seeds germinate after 50–100 days. After six months, seedlings in full sunlight can reach a height of 30 centimetres (12 in); young trees can grow an average of 1 metre (3 ft 3 in) per year.

== Distribution ==
Roystonea borinquena is native to Hispaniola, Puerto Rico (including Vieques) and St. Croix, St. John and Tortola in the Virgin Islands. In Hispaniola, R. borinquena is found at elevations below 800 metres (2,600 ft) above sea level, except in the driest regions. In Puerto Rico it is found in areas below 300 m (1,000 ft) above sea level, that receive 1,250–2,500 millimetres (49–98 in) of rainfall.

== Ecology ==
Roystonea borinquena fruit are a fat-rich food source for birds. White-crowned pigeons (Patagioenas leucocephala) have been reported to disperse the seeds of the species. The Critically Endangered Ridgway's hawk (Buteo ridgwayi), endemic to Hispaniola, favours R. borinquena when nesting. Palmchats (Dulus dominicus), another Hispaniolan endemic, favour the tree when building their large communal nests.

== Uses ==
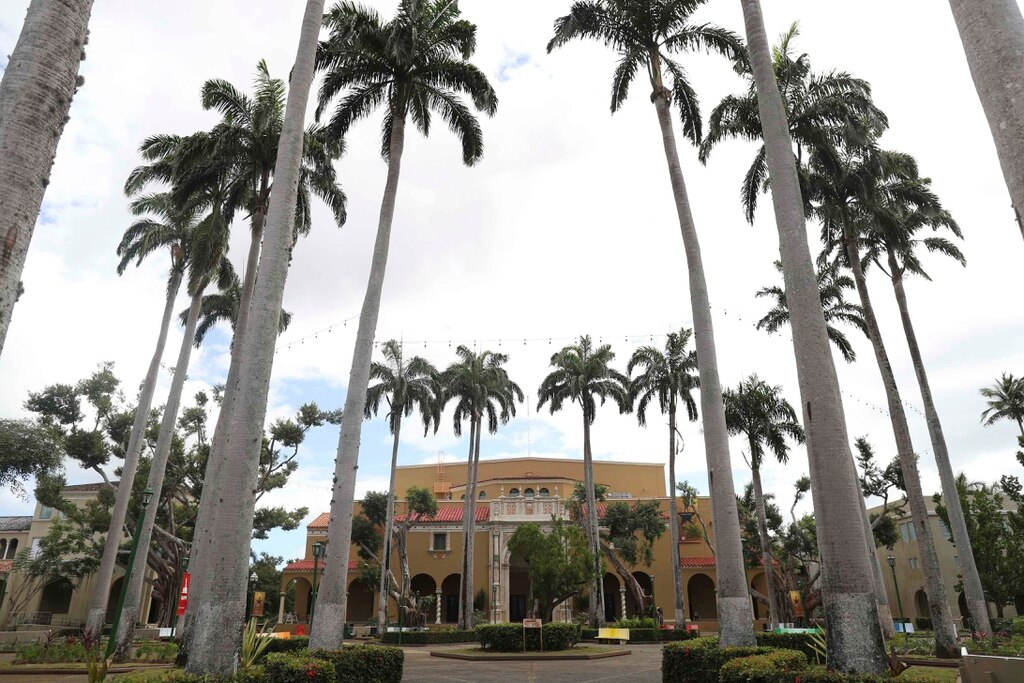
Ornamental use at the Quadrangle of the University of Puerto Rico, Río Piedras Campus

Royal palms are popular ornamental plants due to their striking appearance; Roystonea borinquena is extensively planted as an ornamental in Puerto Rico. Its tolerance of air pollution, its ability to grow in a variety of soil types, and the fact that it roots do not damage sidewalks, increase its utility for landscaping and street planting. Its timber is occasionally used for construction but is susceptible to termite attack. Leaves are used as thatch and the leaf sheaths can be laid flat and used to make the sides of buildings. Trunk bark has historically been used as clapboards called tablas (de palma) or planche (de yagua) for siding in the bohío houses indigenous to Hispaniola and Cuba. The fruit are also fed to pigs and other livestock.
