= Basta Ya (disambiguation) =

¡Basta Ya! is a Spanish grassroots organization.

Basta Ya may also refer to:

- Basta Ya, a 2006 album by Atahualpa Yupanqui
- Basta Ya... Revolución, a 1971 album by Roy Brown
- Basta Ya (Atahualpa Yupanqui song)
- "¡Basta Ya!" (song) a song by Marco Antonio Solís, recorded by a number of performers
- "Basta Ya", a song by Ricky Martin from the album Música + Alma + Sexo
- "Basta Ya (Pop Version)", a song by Tito El Bambino from the album El Patrón: Invencible
