= Jorge López (physicist) =

Jorge Lopez
- Education: Texas A&M University; University of Texas at El Paso
- Scientific career
- Fields: Nuclear physics Physics education
- Workplaces: University of Texas at El Paso

Jorge Alberto López (born 1955 in Monterrey, Mexico) is a physicist and educator and the Schumaker Professor of Physics at the University of Texas at El Paso. He is known for his work in heavy ion collision dynamics and for his outreach to the Hispanic community in the United States to increase diversity in physics, effective teaching and mentoring of undergraduate students (particularly underrepresented minorities), development of bilingual physics education programs, and building collaborations between American and Latin American universities. He is one of the founders of the National Society of Hispanic Physicists and author of books on nuclear physics, surface science, and statistical analysis of elections.

== Awards ==
- 2018 Nature Mentoring Award
- 2018 Texas A&M University College of Science Distinguished Former Student
- 2016 University of Texas System Regents Outstanding Teaching Award
- 2015 American Physical Society Edward A. Bouchet Award
- 2014 White House Presidential Award for Excellence in Science, Mathematics, & Engineering Mentoring
- 2014 American Physical Society Division of Nuclear Physics Mentoring Award
- 2011 Society of Hispanic Professional Engineers Educator of the Year Award
- 2010 Society of Mexican American Engineers and Scientists Outstanding MAEStro Award
- 2007 American Physical Society Fellow
