= Yo Protesto =

Studio album by Roy Brown
- Released: 1969
- Genre: Nova trova, Puerto Rican folk music
- Label: Vanguardia; Disco Libre

Roy Brown chronology
Yo Protesto (1969)	Basta Ya... Revolución (1971)

Alternate cover

Yo Protesto is the first album from Puerto Rican folk singer Roy Brown. The album was initially released under the small label Vanguardia, but was later released by Disco Libre, a label owned by the Puerto Rican Socialist Party.

== Track listing ==
All tracks are written by Roy Brown.

No.	Title	Length
1.	"Monón"
2.	"Mujer de sociedad"
3.	"No me sulfuro más"
4.	"Yo no sé cual es la verdad"
5.	"Mister con macana"
6.	"Paco Márquez"
7.	"El joven del caserío"
8.	"Antiguos baluartes"
9.	"Dime, niña"
10.	"Señor inversionista"
11.	"La mente es un alma dormida"

== Cultural impact ==
Although released in 1969, the album became a symbol of the riots at the University of Puerto Rico that began in 1970. The songs were considered to be part of the movement of rebellion that sparked in the island, highlighting the sociopolitical situation.

In 2005, a tribute album to Roy Brown was released under the title of Yo Protesto: Roy Brown y sus Amigos, coinciding with the 35 anniversary of the release of the album. The album featured new versions of the same songs, some of them with the collaboration of other artists like Danny Rivera, Fiel a la Vega, Tony Croatto, and Silvio Rodríguez, among others.

In 2011, Brown celebrated the 40th anniversary of the album with a concert at the Luis A. Ferré Performing Arts Center.
