= Roosevelt Tower =

- University of Puerto Rico Roosevelt Tower and Quadrangle
- U.S. National Register of Historic Places
- Puerto Rico Historic Sites and Zones
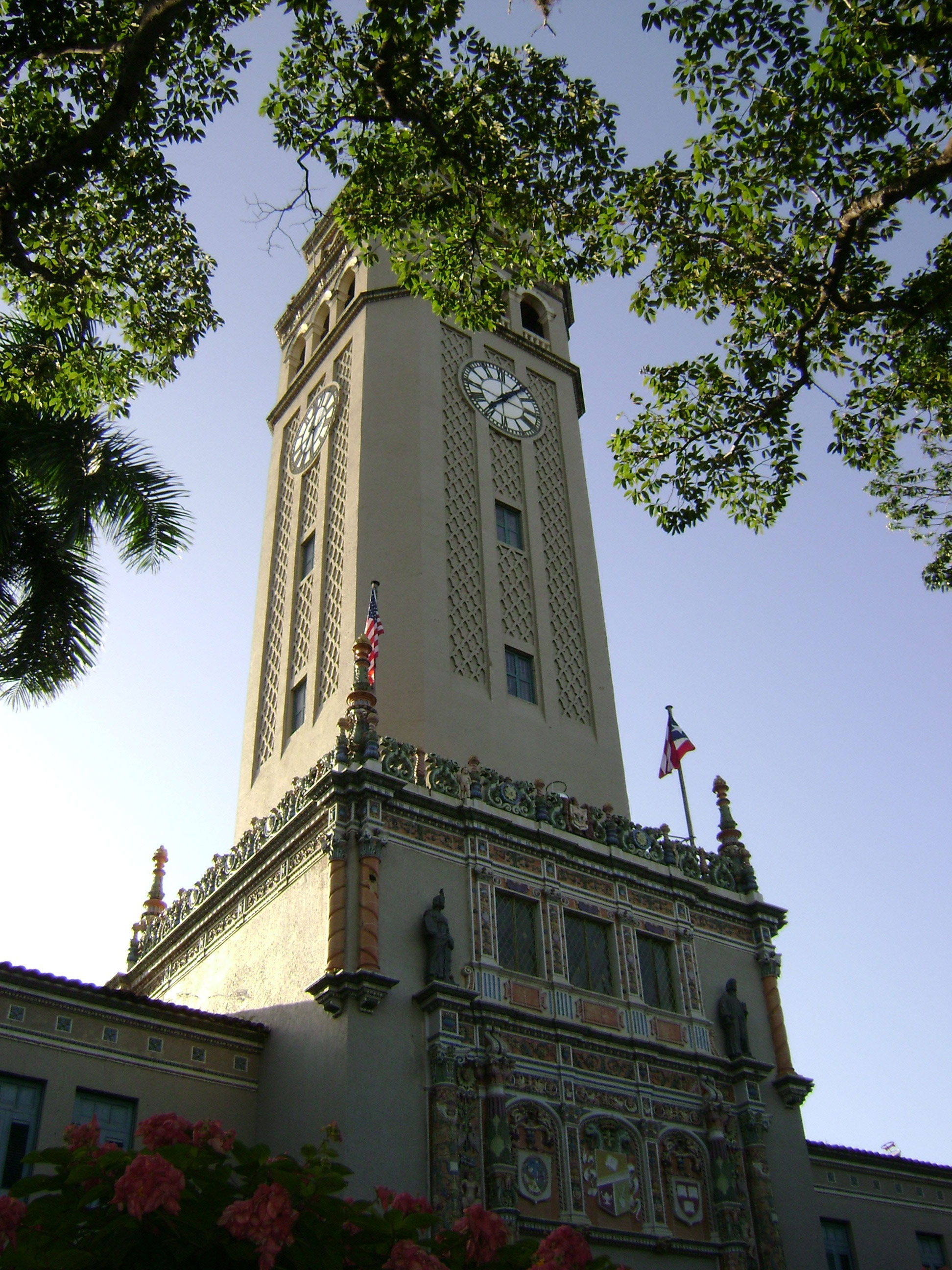
- University of Puerto Rico Tower

- Location within Puerto Rico
- Location: University of Puerto Rico, Río Piedras Campus - Río Piedras, Puerto Rico
- Coordinates: 18°24′10″N 66°03′01″W
- Built: 1937
- Architect: Rafael Carmoega, William Schimmelpfenning
- Architectural style: Spanish Revival
- NRHP reference No.: 84003174
- RNSZH No.: 2000-(RMSJ)-00-JP-SH

Significant dates
- Added to NRHP: May 17, 1984
- Designated RNSZH: February 3, 2000

Roosevelt Tower (officially: Franklin Delano Roosevelt Tower, Spanish: Torre Franklin Delano Roosevelt), more popularly known as La Torre, is a 173.54 feet (52.89 m) clock tower located above the main entrance to the Baldorioty de Castro Building in the University of Puerto Rico, Río Piedras Campus. The tower is also referred to as El Faro (The Lighthouse) and it is considered a symbol of the University of Puerto Rico and of higher education in Puerto Rico. The tower, along with the main historic quadrangle in campus, have been listed on the National Register of Historic Places since 1984, and on the Puerto Rico Register of Historic Sites and Zones since 2000.

== History ==
The building where the tower is located was originally one of the main libraries in campus. Based on the 1924 Parsons Plan, the Puerto Rico Reconstruction Administration (PRRA) hired Puerto Rican architect Rafael Carmoega to design a clock tower for campus. Carmoega also designed the main campus quadrangle located next to the tower. The exterior plans were designed by William Schimmelpfennig whose design followed similar patterns of American university campus towers. Other architects considered for the project were William E. Parsons and Joseph J. O’Kelly. The tower was built in 1937 and its exterior design, inspired in and following Andalusian/Spanish Gothic and Baroque Revival patterns, was completed by 1939. Once completed the tower was inaugurated and named after then incumbent US President Franklin D. Roosevelt to honor his interest and funding in the development of the university. The university theater, completed during this time, also bears the name Roosevelt Theater, although it is named after Eleanor Roosevelt.

== Carillon ==
The tower has a carillon built by the company Deagan. The carillon was out of service for multiple years until it was re-installed by IT Verdin Bells & Clocks. It contains 25 tubular bells; those give the notes from the central “C” to the “C” of the next second octave in bells. There are two octaves in bells. It is programmed in blocks of 7 melodies. The system consists of a 25-pound (11 kg) hammer that is moved by an electromechanical system, the note is given below, the electromechanical system is activated above and with some springs it returns to its position. It follows the Westminster Tracking Hour System. In addition to giving time, the carillon also often plays pieces by famous Latin American composers such as Rafael Hernández and Agustín Lara.

== Culture ==
La Torre is often referred to as El Faro del Saber ("The Lighthouse of Knowledge"), or simply El Faro, as it was instantly recognized as a landmark and symbol of the University of Puerto Rico, in addition to being the first university building of its type to be built in Latin America.

== Gallery ==
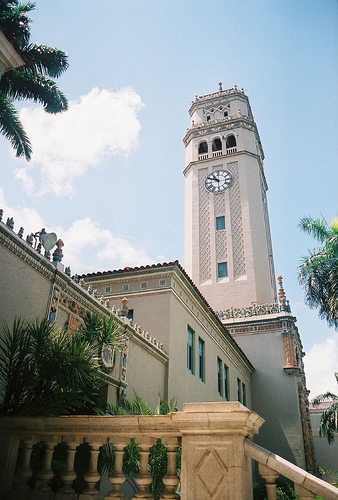
Side closeup of tower

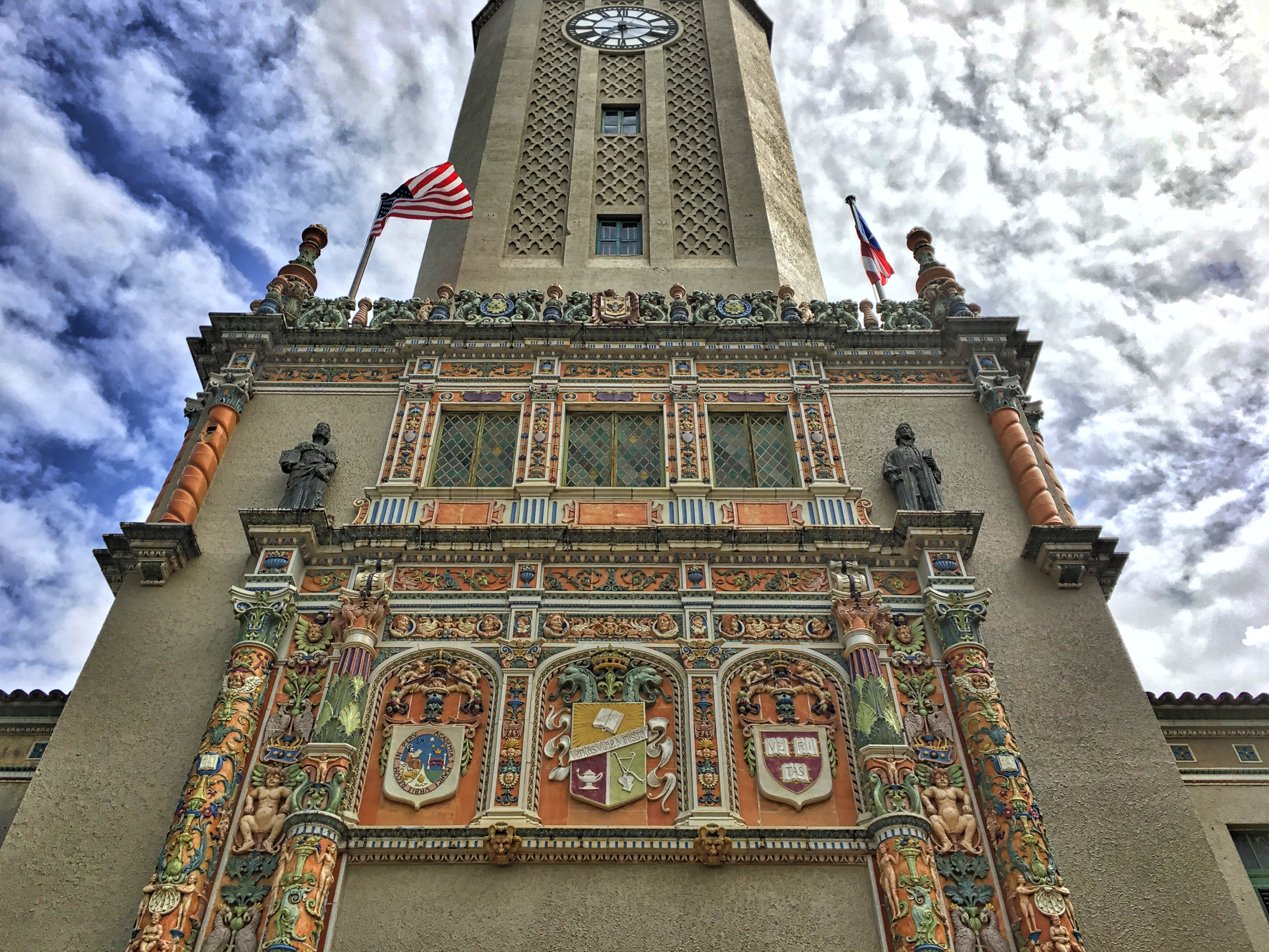
Closeup of the tower designs with the seals of Harvard University and the National University of San Marcos next to that of the University of Puerto Rico

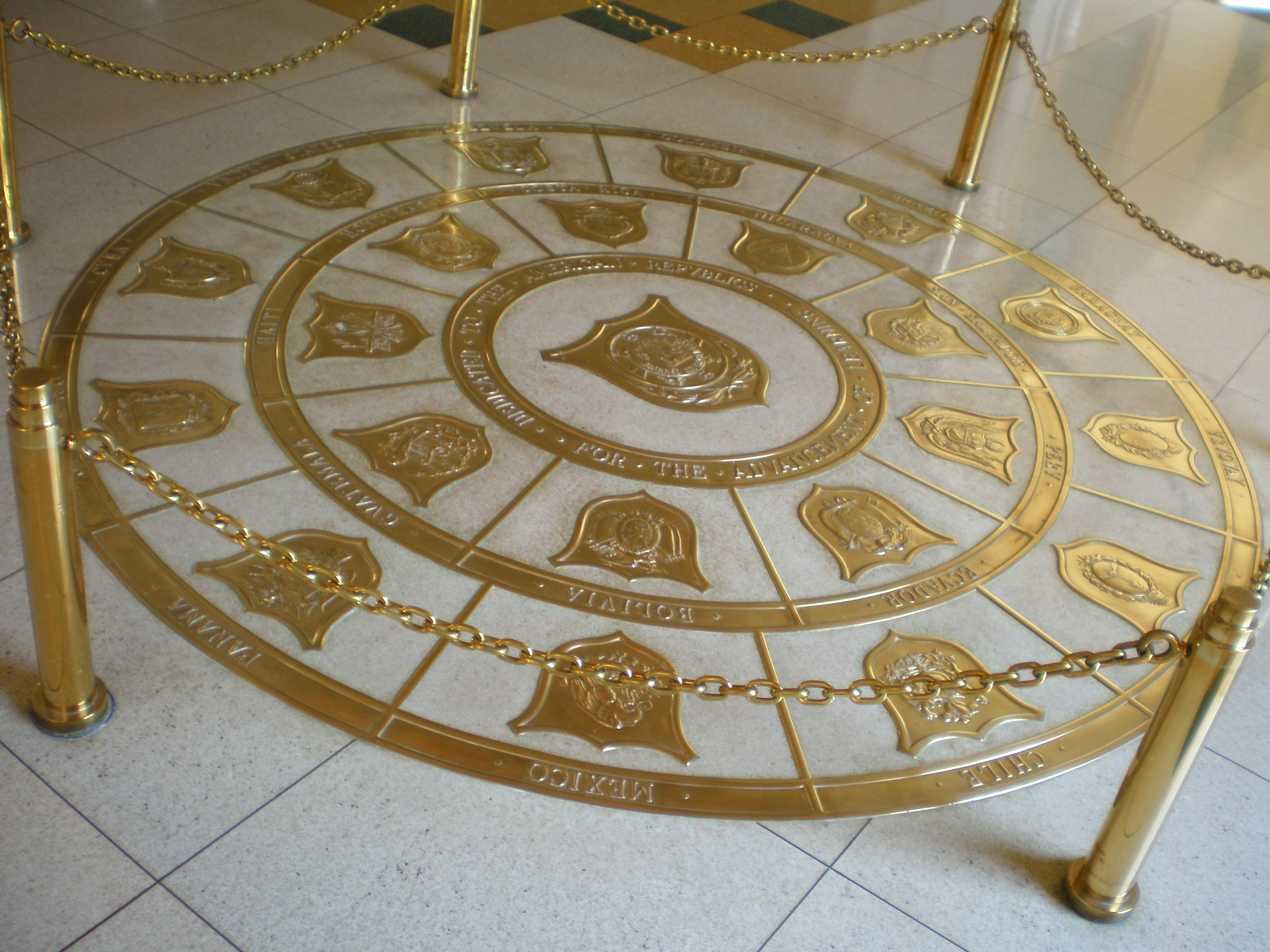
Monument to the Pan-American movement, located inside

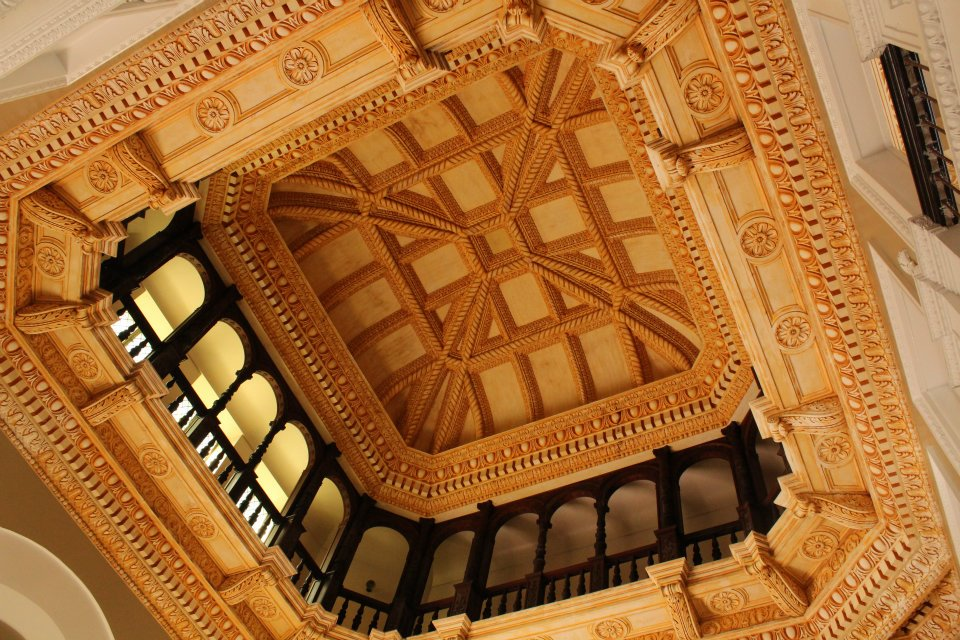
Underneath the tower

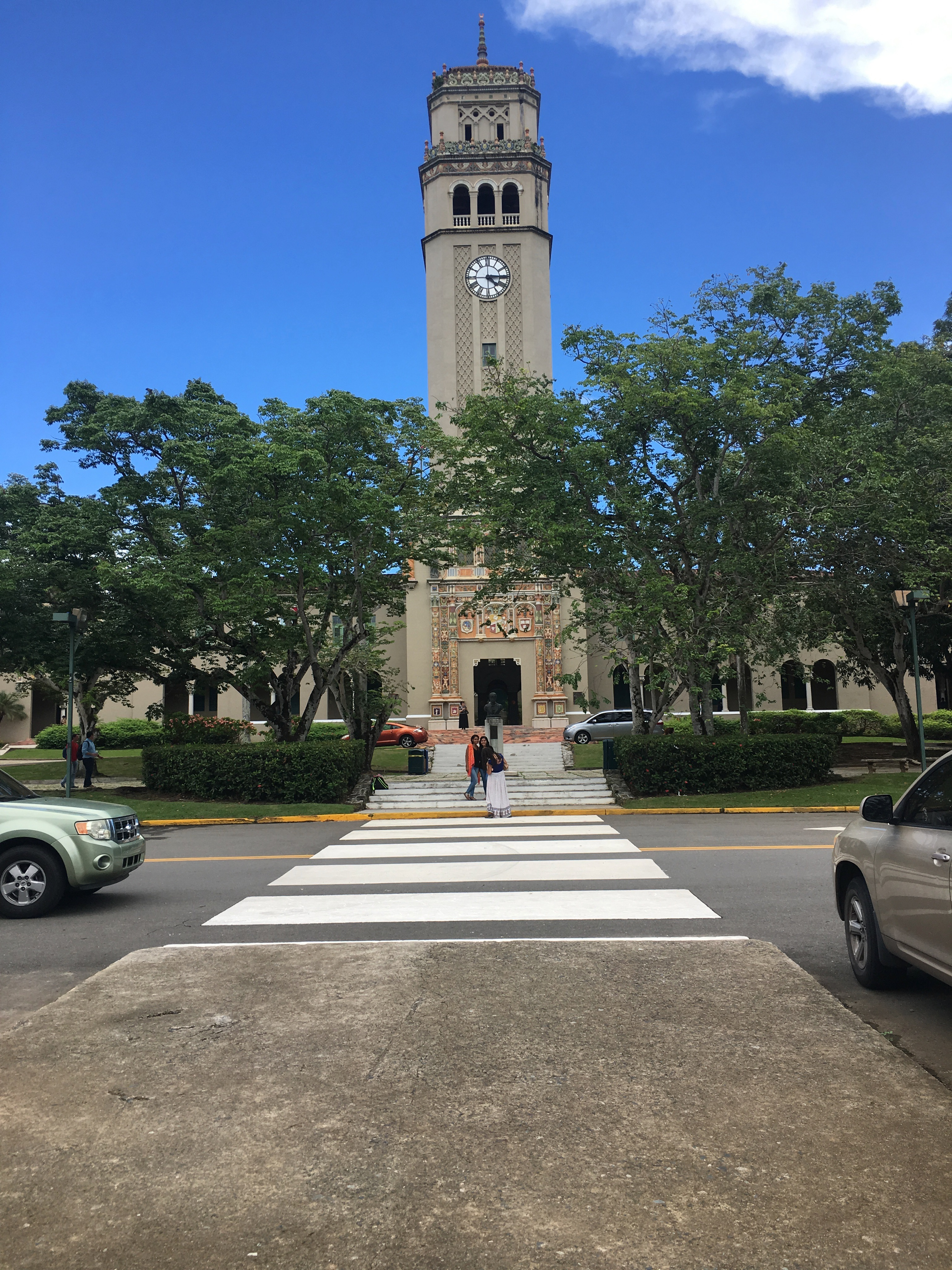
Tower as seen from the main entrance gate of campus

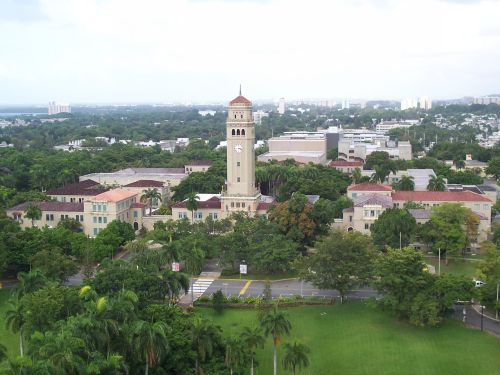
Aerial view of the tower and the Baldorioty de Castro Building

== See also ==
- University and college buildings listed on the National Register of Historic Places
