= Wendy Yang =

American biologist and environmental scientist

- Born: Wendy Liu; 1980 (age 45–46)
- Education: Harvard University (2003) University of California Berkeley (2010)
- Occupation: Professor of Plant Biology at the University of Illinois Urbana-Champaign

Wendy Yang (born 1980) is a professor of Plant Biology at the University of Illinois Urbana-Champaign where she works on soil biogeochemistry and ecosystem ecology.

== Early life and education ==
Yang is from Indialantic, Florida. She became interested in environmental science from an early age when she spent time at an environmental summer camp called Earth Corps at the Brevard Community College following 5th grade. She graduated magna cum laude from Harvard University in 2003, with a degree in Environmental Science and Public Policy. She then moved to the University of California Berkeley, where she earned her PhD in Environmental Science, Policy, and Management in 2010. For her dissertation, she worked with Whendee Silver on developing different methods to measure nitrogen (N_{2}) production in tropical soils, for which she received a National Science Foundation Doctoral Dissertation Improvement Grant.

== Career and research ==
Yang worked as a lab and field technician at the University of California Berkeley from 2003-2004. She is currently a professor of Plant Biology at the University of Illinois Urbana-Champaign. She is known for her work in soil biogeochemistry and ecosystem ecology, specifically examining the way nitrogen cycles through an ecosystem and the effects that anthropogenic use of nitrogen has on ecosystems. Her current research is focused on greenhouse gas emissions and soil and the role that microorganisms in the soil, like bacteria and fungi, have in producing these gases. She received a NSF grant to pursue this work in 2018, as part of a larger collaboration with scientists from Georgia Tech and the University of Tennessee Knoxville to understand the role microbes have in nitrous oxide emissions from soil.

=== Publications ===
Yang's most notable publications include her research on more precise methods for measuring nitrogen fluxes from terrestrial ecosystems, as it is often difficult to tell the amount of N_{2} gas released from soil due to the concentration of N_{2} gas already existing abundantly in the atmosphere. Another notable publication was Yang's research on leaf litter, how climate impacts the rate of leaf decomposition and the amount of nitrogen released by decomposition. Her most cited publications are as follows:

- Cusack, DF, Chou, WW, Yang, WH, Harmon, ME, Silver, WL, the LIDET Team (2009) Controls on long-term root and leaf litter decomposition in neotropical forests. Global Change Biology, 15, 1339-1355.
- Sack, L, Melcher, P, Liu, WH, Middleton, E, Pardee, T (2006) How strong is intra-canopy leaf plasticity in temperate deciduous trees? American Journal of Botany, 93, 829-839
- Yang, WH, Weber, KA, Silver, WL (2012) Nitrogen loss from soil through anaerobic ammonium oxidation coupled to iron reduction. Nature Geoscience, 5, 538-541.
- Burgin, AM, Yang, WH, Silver, WL, Hamilton, S (2011) Beyond C and N: How the microbial energy economy couples elemental cycles in diverse ecosystems. Frontiers in Ecology and the Environment, 9, 44-52.
- Liu, WH, Bryant, DM, Hutyra, LR, Saleska, SR, Hammond Pyle, E, Curran, DC, Wofsy SC (2006) Woody debris contribution to the carbon budgets of selectively-logged and maturing midlatitude forests. Oecologia, 148, 108-117.

== Awards and honors ==
- National Science Foundation Graduate Research Fellowship (2006)
- National Science Foundation Doctoral Dissertation Improvement Grant (2008)
- Awarded the LEAP (Lincoln Excellence for Assistant Professors) award at the University of Illinois Urbana-Champaign, an institutional honor that recognized her for her teaching and research achievements (2017)
- Elected as an Early Career Fellow of the Ecological Society of America (2018)
- Named a Deputy Theme Leader at the Center for Advanced Bioenergy and Bioproducts Innovation, a new center at the University of Illinois Urbana-Chamaign funded by a Department of Energy grant focused on researching more ecologically sound and economically stable methods for agriculture (2018)
