= Luz Martinez-Miranda =

American-Puerto Rican physicist

- Born: Bethesda, Maryland
- Education: University of Puerto Rico (MPhys); Massachusetts Institute of Technology (PhD)
- Scientific career
- Fields: Liquid crystals
- Workplaces: University of Maryland
- Thesis: Crossover Behavior and Fluctuations in the Vicinity of a Liquid Crystal Multicritical Point
- Doctoral advisor: Robert J. Birgeneau
- Doctoral students: Elisabeth Smela

Dr. Luz J. Martinez Miranda, 2008

Luz Josefina Martinez-Miranda (8 September 1956 – 27 April 2026) was an American-Puerto Rican physicist. She was an associate professor in the College of Materials Science and Engineering at the University of Maryland. Martinez-Miranda was an APS Fellow and was the first female president of the National Society of Hispanic Physicists.

== Early life and education ==
Martinez-Miranda was born in Bethesda, Maryland, and moved to Puerto Rico at the age of five. Her parents were both originally from Puerto Rico and were both chemists. She attended high school in Puerto Rico at University High School, and went on to receive her bachelor's and master's degrees in physics from the University of Puerto Rico. While studying at the university's Río Piedras campus, she concurrently attended the Conservatory of Music of Puerto Rico, and earned a degree in musical performance with a specialization in piano performance.

She graduated with her PhD in 1985 from Massachusetts Institute of Technology (MIT). While at MIT, she was one of only 8 women of the 68 people in the physics program. Her doctoral advisor was Robert Birgeneau and her thesis was titled "Crossover Behavior and Fluctuations in the Vicinity of a Liquid Crystal Multicritical Point."

== Career ==
After receiving her PhD, Martinez-Miranda held positions at UC Berkeley and the Naval Research Laboratory.

In 1995, she joined the faculty of the University of Maryland, College Park, and helped in the design of its junior materials laboratory. She was an undergraduate advisor for the Materials Science and Engineering Department at the University of Maryland. She studied the interaction of liquid crystal with nanoscale materials for engineering and biological applications.

She was the third president and the first female president of the National Society of Hispanic Physicists.

== Research ==
Martinez-Miranda's research focused on the interaction of liquid crystal with nanoscale materials.

== Personal life ==
In addition to piano, Martinez-Miranda played the harpsichord, specializing in Baroque music. Dr. Martinez Miranda passed away in 2026.

== Professional memberships ==
- American Ceramic Society
- American Physical Society (APS)
- American Association for the Advancement of Science (AAAS)
- NSHP (National Society for Hispanic Physicists)
- SACNAS (the Society for the Advancement of Chicanos and Native Americans in Science)

== Awards and honors ==
Martinez-Miranda was awarded the status of Fellow in the American Physical Society, after she was nominated by the Forum on Education in 2007, for sustained achievements in recruiting, mentoring, and advancing women and minorities in physics; for engaging K-16 students in the excitement of research; and for being a role model through her research to understand liquid crystal systems and further their application.

- Fellow, American Physical Society (APS), 2007
- Visiting Faculty Appointment to the Centre de Recherche Paul Pascal, 2006
- Fellow, American Association for the Advancement of Science (AAAS), 2004
- Boricua College Professional Achievement Award in Science, 2004
- NSF Career Advancement Award, 1997
- W.M. Keck Foundation, Engineering Excellence Teaching Award, 1995
- Fellow, American Ceramic Society, 1994
- NSF Visiting Professorship for Women, 1994–1996.

== See also ==
- List of fellows of the American Physical Society (1998–2010)
