= The Quadrangle (University of Puerto Rico, Río Piedras) =

University of Puerto Rico historic place

- University of Puerto Rico Tower and The Quadrangle
- U.S. National Register of Historic Places
- Puerto Rico Historic Sites and Zones
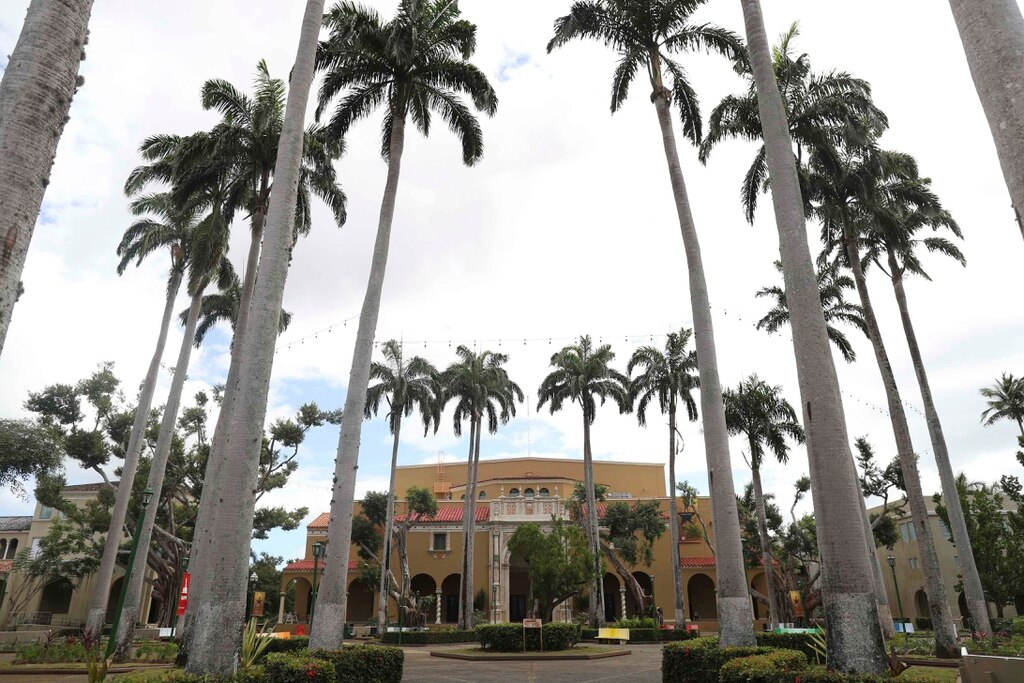
- View of The Quadrangle with El Teatro in the background.

- Location within Puerto Rico
- Location: University of Puerto Rico, Río Piedras Campus - Río Piedras, Puerto Rico
- Coordinates: 18°24′10″N 66°03′01″W
- Built: 1935
- Architect: Rafael Carmoega
- Architectural style: Neoclassical Spanish Revival
- NRHP reference No.: 84003174
- RNSZH No.: 2000-(RMSJ)-00-JP-SH

Significant dates
- Added to NRHP: May 17, 1984
- Designated RNSZH: February 3, 2000

The Quadrangle (Spanish: El Cuadrángulo) is the heart and main quadrangle of the University of Puerto Rico, Río Piedras. Together with the Roosevelt Tower (La Torre), it is listed on the National Register of Historic Places and the Puerto Rico Register of Historic Sites and Zones as the University of Puerto Rico Tower and The Quadrangle, for its unique history which represents the union between Puerto Rican architecture with the Jeffersonian Neoclassical style often seen in American universities. It is famous for its lines of Puerto Rican royal palm (Roystonea borinquena) or palma real and the architecture of its surrounding buildings.

The Quadrangle was designed by Puerto Rican architect Rafael Carmoega. The University of Puerto Rico Theater was first built on its eastern edge in 1939.

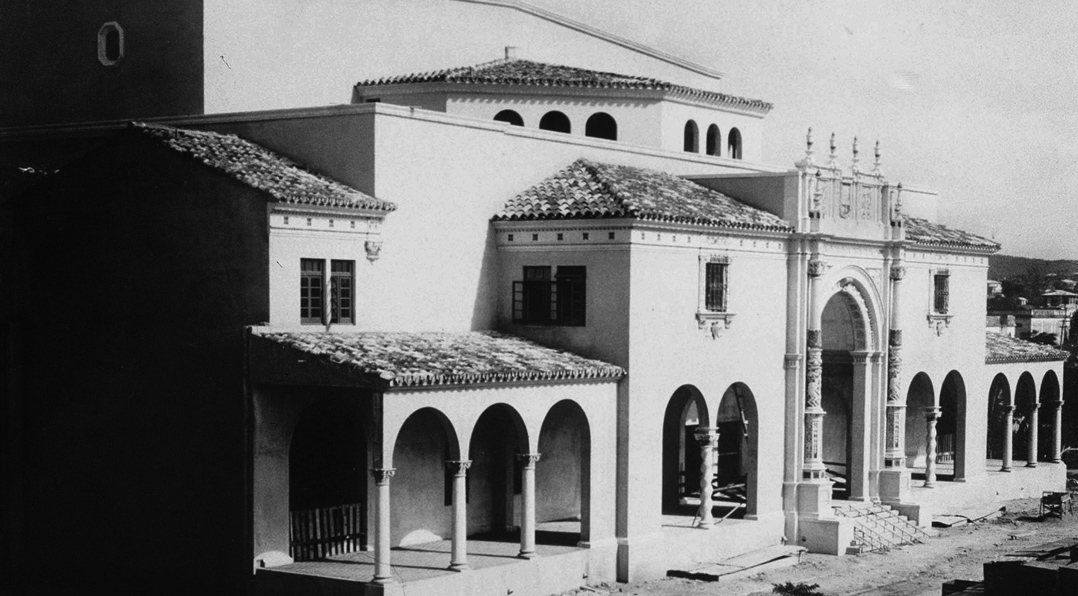
Construction of the UPR Theater and buildings around The Quadrangle.

The Quadrangle is the largest courtyard space in the University of Puerto Rico, Río Piedras campus. It is surrounding by buildings currently used by the University of Puerto Rico Administration and the College of Humanities. Its two most notable landmarks are the University Tower located on the western edge of the quad, and the University of Puerto Rico Theater, also known as the Roosevelt Theater, on its eastern edge. These buildings have an architectural style combining Spanish Revival styles such as Andalusian/Spanish Gothic and Baroque Revival. There is also a Banco Popular branch office and additional auditoriums.

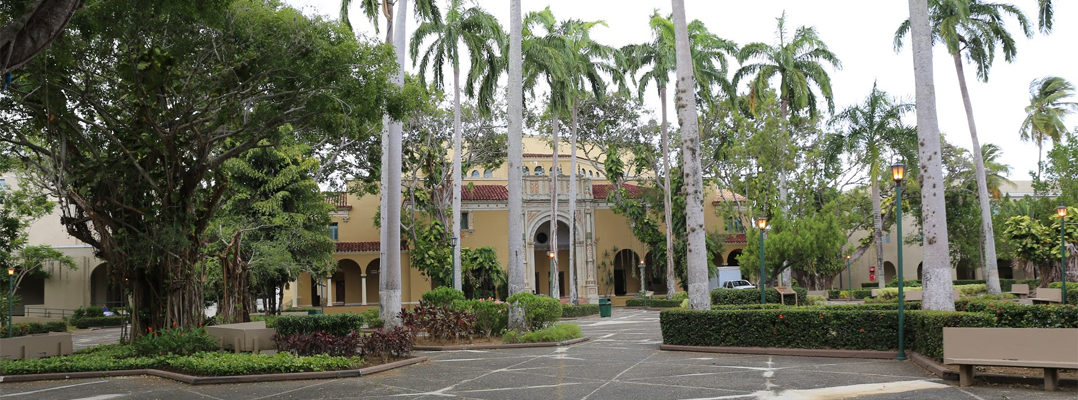
Panoramic view of El Cuadrángulo.

== See also ==
- La Torre, officially known in English as Roosevelt Tower
- University and college buildings listed on the National Register of Historic Places
