= Grizelle González =

Soil ecologist (born 20th century)

- Born: Grizelle González de Jesús; 20th century
- Education: University of Puerto Rico; University of Colorado Boulder
- Scientific career
- Fields: Soil ecology
- Workplaces: United States Forest Service
- Thesis: Soil fauna, microbes and plant litter decomposition in tropical and subalpine forests (1999 (27 years ago))

Grizelle González is a soil ecologist working for the United States Forest Service in San Juan, Puerto Rico. She is known for her work on soil ecology, nutrient cycling, and ecosystem ecology at the Sabana Field Research Station in Puerto Rico.

== Early life and education ==
González obtained a Bachelor of Science degree in biology in 1993 and a Master of Science degree in soil ecology in 1996 from the University of Puerto Rico. She earned a Doctor of Philosophy degree from the University of Colorado Boulder in soil ecology and biology in 1999. Her dissertation was focused on microbes, plant litter, and soil fauna in both tropical and subalpine forests.

== Career ==
González started her professional career as a research associate at the University of Alaska Fairbanks in 1999. In 2000, she began her career at the United States Forest Service (USFS) International Institute of Tropical Forests (IITF), and, in 2003, she became the director of the Sabana Field Research Station in Puerto Rico. She is also associated faculty at the University of Puerto Rico, Río Piedras Campus.

=== Research ===
González's research has been focused on soil ecology, biogeochemistry, and nutrient cycling in tropical forests involving earthworms, and plant litter and decomposition in tropical environments. She has also examined earthworms as invasive species, and the role of elevation in controlling the distribution of earthworms.

Her more-recent work in Puerto Rico focuses on tropical-forest ecology, where she focuses on research in Puerto Rico's El Yunque National Forest and an experimental forest on Saint Thomas, U.S. Virgin Islands.

González also served as science coordinator for the "Poetic Science" exhibits at the Museo de Arte Contemporáneo de Puerto Rico (Puerto Rico Museum of Contemporary Art), which won awards from the USFS and the International Association of Art Critics.

Following the 2017 Hurricane Maria, González has been examining the immediate impact of the hurricane on Puerto Rico, and its recovering in 2018 into 2019.

=== Selected publications ===
- González, Grizelle; Seastedt, Timothy R. (2001). "Soil fauna and plant litter decomposition in tropical and subalpine forests". Ecology. 82 (4): 955–964. doi:10.1890/0012-9658(2001)082[0955:sfapld]2.0.co;2. ISSN 0012-9658.
- Zou, Xiaoming; Gonzalez, Grizelle (March 1, 1997). "Changes in earthworm density and community structure during secondary succession in abandoned tropical pastures". Soil Biology and Biochemistry. 5th International Symposium on Earthworm Ecology. 29 (3): 627–629. Bibcode:1997SBiBi..29..627Z. doi:10.1016/S0038-0717(96)00188-5. ISSN 0038-0717.
- González, Grizelle; Huang, Ching Yu; Zou, Xiaoming; Rodríguez, Carlos (2006), "Earthworm invasions in the tropics", in Hendrit, Paul F. (ed.), Biological Invasions Belowground: Earthworms as Invasive Species, Dordrecht: Springer Netherlands, pp. 47–56, doi:10.1007/978-1-4020-5429-7_6, ISBN 978-1-4020-5428-0
- Prather, Chelse M.; Belovsky, Gary E.; Cantrell, Sharon A.; González, Grizelle (2018). "Tropical herbivorous phasmids, but not litter snails, alter decomposition rates by modifying litter bacteria". Ecology. 99 (4): 782–791. Bibcode:2018Ecol...99..782P. doi:10.1002/ecy.2169. ISSN 1939-9170. PMID 29603190.

== See also ==
- List of soil scientists
- List of University of Colorado Boulder alumni
- List of University of Puerto Rico, Río Piedras people
- List of women scientists in the 21st century
