= Antonia Martínez =

Puerto Rican murder victim

- Born: April 22, 1949; Arecibo, Puerto Rico
- Died: March 4, 1970 (aged 20); Río Piedras, Puerto Rico

Antonia Martínez Lagares (April 22, 1949 – March 4, 1970) was a 20-year-old student at the University of Puerto Rico at Río Piedras who was shot and killed by a policeman as she criticized the police violence while watching the 1970 anti-Vietnam War and Education Reform student protests at the University of Puerto Rico. She became a symbol against oppression, intolerance and US imperialism in post-Ponce massacre Puerto Rico. Martínez was from Arecibo, Puerto Rico.

== Background ==
In Puerto Rico, as in much of the rest of the world, the late 1960s and early 1970s were characterized by profound social, economic, and political changes. A large portion of the student body at the University of Puerto Rico at Rio Piedras, as well as much of its faculty, supported higher education reform that would produce changes to the administrative and educational formats in place. Of particular focus was the concept of "Casa de Estudios" (literally, "House of Studies") recently implemented by Chancellor Jaime Benitez, and which was founded on a Western and universalist educational and administrative vision of the University as opposed to one of regional and national character.

== Unrest at University of Puerto Rico ==
The newly implemented administrative changes resulted in friction between the administration and much of the student body. Student strikes and protests followed. Various laws were passed by the Government of Puerto Rico that sought to address concerns and some changes in governance were implemented, but the unrest continued. Many students opposed the political structure of the University, including the fact that they were given a voice but not a vote in university matters that affected them; the on-campus presence of the ROTC, the mandatory military service conscription; and the war in Vietnam. These factors resulted in student marches and protests.

On March 4, 1970, during these protests, the Fuerza de Choque (Riot Police) was sent to the University of Puerto Rico at Rio Piedras to intervene against students protesting the presence of the Reserve Officers Training Corps on the campus. As the event unfolded, it is alleged that Antonia observed the police riots shooting at students in Río Piedras. They watched as police officers began beating fellow students and the people on the balcony shouted at them "asesinos" (murderers) and "abusadores" (abusers). Antonia herself was noted to just barely have been looking over the balcony and she had not shouted. At that point, allegedly, one of the police officers, suspected to be Lt. José de Jesús Vidal, looked up to the balcony and spotted the crowd, retrieved his service revolver and shot towards the balcony. A bullet pierced her head and also injured another student who stood with her. Antonia died shortly at the Auxilio Mutuo hospital.

== Case and trial ==
Celestino Santiago, the other wounded student, recalled the events and identified some of the police officers involved. An officer who was not in the vicinity of the shooting was brought to the police and charged for the crime but was later acquitted. The police stated that they were shooting into the air in an attempt to disperse the crowd. The practice of firing shots into the air has been long discarded and is currently prohibited by departmental guidelines.

== Memorials ==
In 2010 the mural that commemorated the 40th anniversary of the killing of Antonia Martínez Lagares was surreptitiously vandalized. Its restoration was led by former political prisoner Rafael Cancel Miranda and aided by activists from various organizations and supported by a group of urban artists. Another mural memorializing Martínez Lagares was created at the Humanities Hall of the University of Puerto Rico at Rio Piedras.

Martínez is one of two University of Puerto Rico students who died during rioting in the early 1970s. A year after her death, University of Puerto Rico Reserve Officers' Training Corps cadet Jacinto Gutierrez was killed while defending the Reserve Officers' Training Corps building at the University of Puerto Rico at Rio Piedras.

== In pop culture ==
The death of Antonia Martínez Lagares has had a significant influence on pop culture in Puerto Rico and became a symbol of police abuse and oppression. Puerto Rican singer Roy Brown, for example, wrote a song about the incident for his second album, Basta Ya... Revolución. Other songs were written by Leró Martínez Roldán (No te olvidamos Antonia) in his album Boricua Soy, Antonio Cabán Vale and Andrés Jiménez.

== Legacy ==
An elementary school in San Germán, Puerto Rico now bears the name of Antonia Martínez Lagares.
