= Murder of Jacinto Gutiérrez =

Puerto Rican Army ROTC cadet who was murdered on 11 March 1971

Jacinto Gutiérrez
- Born: c. 25 July 1949; Ponce, Puerto Rico
- Died: 11 March 1971 (age 20); Río Piedras, Puerto Rico
- Resting place: Cementerio La Piedad; Ponce, Puerto Rico
- Other names: Junior
- Known for: Victim of homicide

Jacinto Gutiérrez born in Ponce, Puerto Rico, was a University of Puerto Rico Río Piedras campus Army Reserve Officers' Training Corps cadet who was murdered on 11 March 1971 at the Army Reserve Officers Training Corps building during a riot by groups opposing the program's presence on the campus. During the riots, two Puerto Rico Police officers, Riot Squad commander Juan Birino Mercado and Sergeant Miguel Rosario Rondón, also lost their lives. No one has ever been charged with his killing.

Gutiérrez was buried in his hometown of Ponce at Cementerio La Piedad. His death is frequently commemorated by groups supporting statehood for Puerto Rico.

== See also ==
- Antonia Martínez
- List of unsolved murders (1900–1979)
