= Basta Ya... Revolución =

Studio album by Roy Brown
- Released: 1971
- Genre: Nova trova, Puerto Rican folk music
- Label: Disco Libre

Roy Brown chronology
Yo Protesto (1969)	Basta Ya... Revolución (1971)	Roy Brown III (1973)

Basta Ya... Revolución is the second studion album by Puerto Rican folk singer Roy Brown. The album was released by Disco Libre in 1971.

== Track listing ==
All tracks are written by Roy Brown.

No.	Title	Length
1.	"Antonia murió de un balazo"
2.	"Pa'l viejo y que adivine"
3.	"Negrito bonito"
4.	"Lamento nuyorquino"
5.	"Falsos constructores"
6.	"Al hombre nuevo (a la brigada de la zona minera)"
7.	"Soy puertorriqueño"
8.	"Vengan mis amigos"
9.	"Descarga No. 51"

== Cultural relevance ==
Along with Yo Protesto, this album is considered to be representative of the manifestations and rebellions of the time.

The song "Antonia murió de un balazo" is about the murder of student Antonia Martínez by a police officer during the 1970 riots at the University of Puerto Rico at Río Piedras.
