= National Society of Hispanic Physicists =

The National Society of Hispanic Physicists (NSHP) was established in 1996 with the goal of promoting the participation and advancement of Hispanic-Americans in physics and celebrating the contributions of Hispanic-American physicists to the study and teaching of physics.

== Brief history ==
The Pan-American Association for Physics received support to establish the National Society of Hispanic Physicists (NSHP) in the form of grants from the Sloan Foundation. Initial financial support of 30 K USD was reported in the Sloan Foundation's Annual Report 1995. An initial organizing meeting was held at the University of Texas at Austin in May 1995, under the leadership of David Ernst, Carlos Ordonez, and Jorge Lopez. The Founding Meeting of the Society was held at the University of Texas at Austin in April, 1996 and the first annual meeting was held in Houston, Texas in October 1997.

Also in 1997, The Hispanic Physicist, the official newsletter of the NSHP, was first published. The US-Mexico Workshop on Teaching Introductory Physics, the first major project undertaken by the Society, was held the same year in Monterrey, Mexico. The project was a bilingual joint venture between the NSHP and the Instituto Tecnológico y de Estudios Superiores de Monterrey (ITESM) to explore the goals of the introductory physics sequence and recent pedagogical developments to meet those goals.

The NSHP meets jointly with other societies organizing sessions, hosting social functions, promoting discussions of diversity and inclusion issues in the physics community, and recognizing achievements of Hispanic-American physics students and faculty.

The National Society of Hispanic Physicists has met annually with the Society for the Advancement of Chicanos and Native Americans in Science (SACNAS) since 1997 and twice with the American Association of Physics Teachers (AAPT) (in Austin, TX in 2003 and Albuquerque, NM in 2005). In addition, the NSHP has met at sectional meetings of the American Physical Society (APS) and the American Astronomical Society (AAS). From 2004-2006, the Society has met annually with the National Society of Black Physicists.

The National Society of Hispanic Physicists was incorporated under the umbrella of the Southeastern Universities Research Association (SURA) in August 2014, giving it tax exemption status as an incorporated 501(c)(3) organization.

== Presidents ==
- 2023: Mario F. Borunda, Oklahoma State University
- 2022-2023: Mario Diaz, University of Texas Rio Grande Valley
- 2018-2019: Ramon E. López, University of Texas, Arlington
- 2010-2016: Luz Martínez-Miranda, University of Maryland
- 2008: David J. Ernst, Vanderbilt University
- 2006-2007: Sergio Ulloa, Ohio University
- 2003-2005: Luz Martínez-Miranda, University of Maryland
- 2000-2003: Jorge A. Lopez, University of Texas at El Paso
- Charter President, Jose D. Garcia, University of Arizona in Tucson

== Mission and goals ==
The purpose of this society is to promote the professional well-being and recognize the accomplishments of Hispanic physicists within the scientific community of the United States and within society at large.

The Society seeks to develop and support efforts to increase opportunities for Hispanics in physics and to increase the number of practicing Hispanic physicists, particularly by encouraging Hispanic students to enter a career in physics.

... from the Constitution of the National Society of Hispanic Physicists, 1997

The Society pursues its mission through four very broad activities.

1) Promoting the study of physics among Hispanic students.

2) Recognizing the accomplishments of Hispanic physics faculty and students in all areas of physics research, teaching, study, mentoring, and outreach.

3) Bringing Hispanic faculty and students together to celebrate both science and shared culture.

4) Working with the larger physics community to make it more inclusive and diversified.

== See also ==
- American Association of Physics Teachers
- American Astronomical Society
- American Physical Society
- National Society of Black Physicists
