= University of Puerto Rico, Río Piedras Campus =

Public land-grant research university in San Juan, Puerto Rico

University of Puerto Rico, Río Piedras
- Former name: Escuela Normal Industrial (1901-1903)
- Motto: Historia veritas vitae ministra (Latin)
- Motto in English: "History serves as the truth of life"
- Type: Public land-grant research university
- Established: March 12, 1903; 123 years ago
- Parent institution: University of Puerto Rico
- Accreditation: MSCHE
- Academic affiliations: Sea-grant; Space-grant
- Budget: $202.5 million (2020)
- President: Vacant
- Rector: Angélica Varela Llavona
- Dean: Grisel E. Meléndez Ramos
- Academic staff: 1,374
- Administrative staff: 2,406
- Students: 18,653
- Undergraduates: 15,186
- Postgraduates: 3,467
- Doctoral students: 773
- Location: Río Piedras, Puerto Rico; 18°24′10″N 66°03′00″W
- Campus: 289 acres (1.17 km^{2}); Large city
- Magazine: Diálogo
- Colors: Red and white
- Sporting affiliations: NCAA Division II - Independent; LAI
- Mascots: The Rooster & the Hen
- Website: uprrp.edu

The University of Puerto Rico, Río Piedras Campus (Spanish: Universidad de Puerto Rico, Recinto de Río Piedras; UPR-RP, or informally La IUPI) is a public land-grant research university in San Juan, Puerto Rico. It is the largest campus in the University of Puerto Rico system in terms of student population and it was Puerto Rico's first public university campus.

The university serves more than 18,000 students, 20% of whom are graduate students, and grants an average of over 3,000 degrees a year. Its academic offerings range from the bachelor to the doctoral level with 70 undergraduate programs and 19 graduate degrees including 71 specializations in the basic disciplines and professional fields.

== History ==
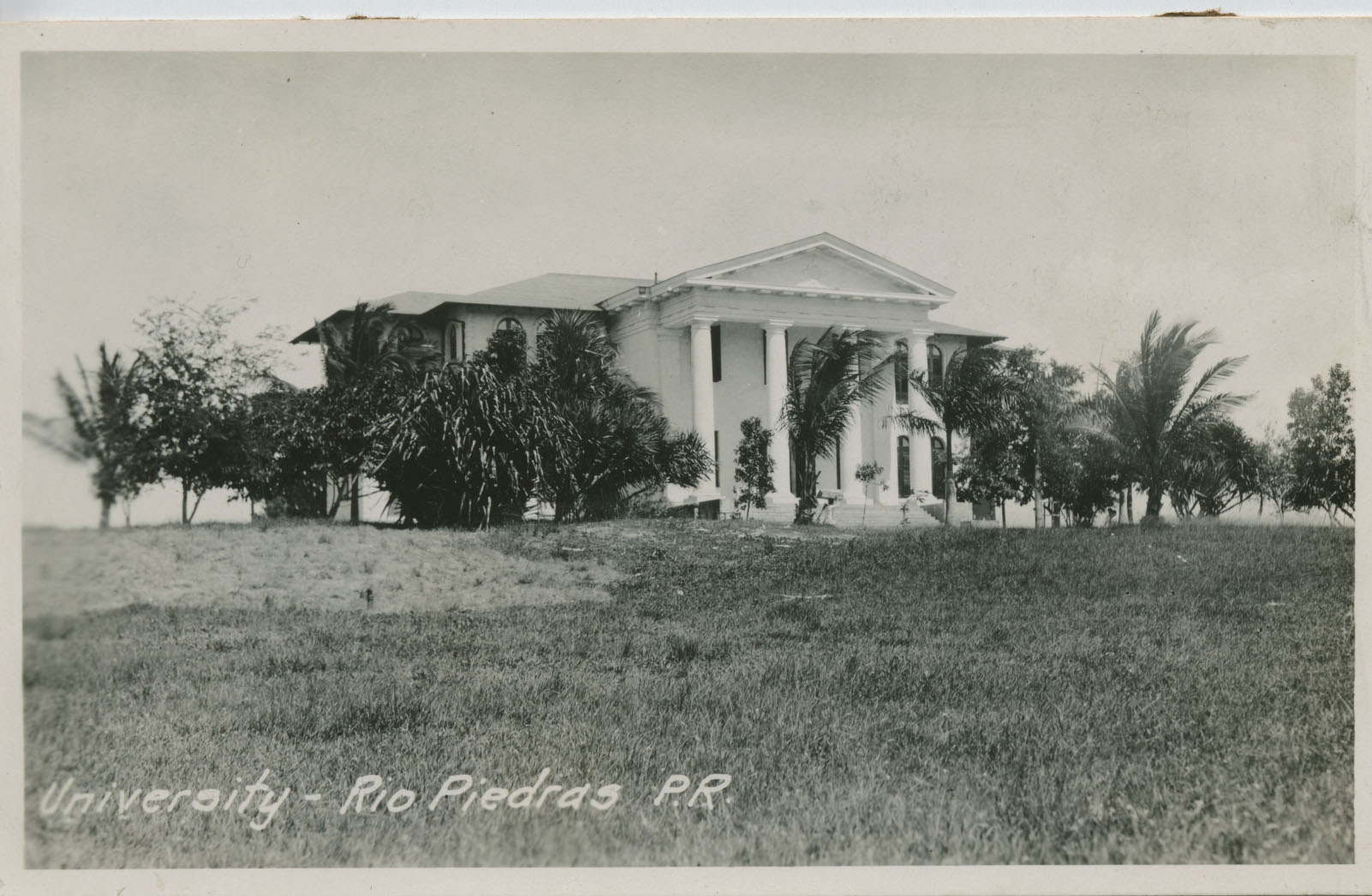
University in Río Piedras, c. 1900–1917

In the year 1900 the Escuela Normal Industrial (Normal Industrial School) was established in Fajardo, Puerto Rico, as the first institution of higher education in Puerto Rico dedicated to train those who would become teachers and educators. At the time it only had 20 students and 5 professors.

A year later (1901) the institution was moved to an area previously occupied by farmland immediately north of the town of Río Piedras, today part of the municipality of San Juan. The Normal School was established in La Convalecencia, which was one of the residences of the former Spanish Governors. The school enrolled 273 students on its first year, and its first bachelor's degrees were granted four years later in 1907.

On March 12, 1903, under the administration of the Public Instruction Commissioner, Samuel McCune Lindsay, the 2nd Legislative Assembly approved a law creating the University of Puerto Rico in Río Piedras, transferring all the funding of the Insular Normal School there. This school became the first department of the university, what is now the Faculty of Education, becoming the nucleus of the University of Puerto Rico.

Now legally established, the University of Puerto Rico started its first academic year (1903–1904) with an enrollment of 173 students. Due to the scarcity of teachers in the island, most of these students were appointed by the Department of Public Instruction to teach at schools without having finished four years of college. The first graduating class (June 1907) consisted of 13 students.

In 1907, the first class graduated from the normal course of four years after the university was legally established. Among the students in that class were Carlota Matienzo, Isabel Andréu, Loaíza Cordero, Marina Roviro, and Juan Herrero.

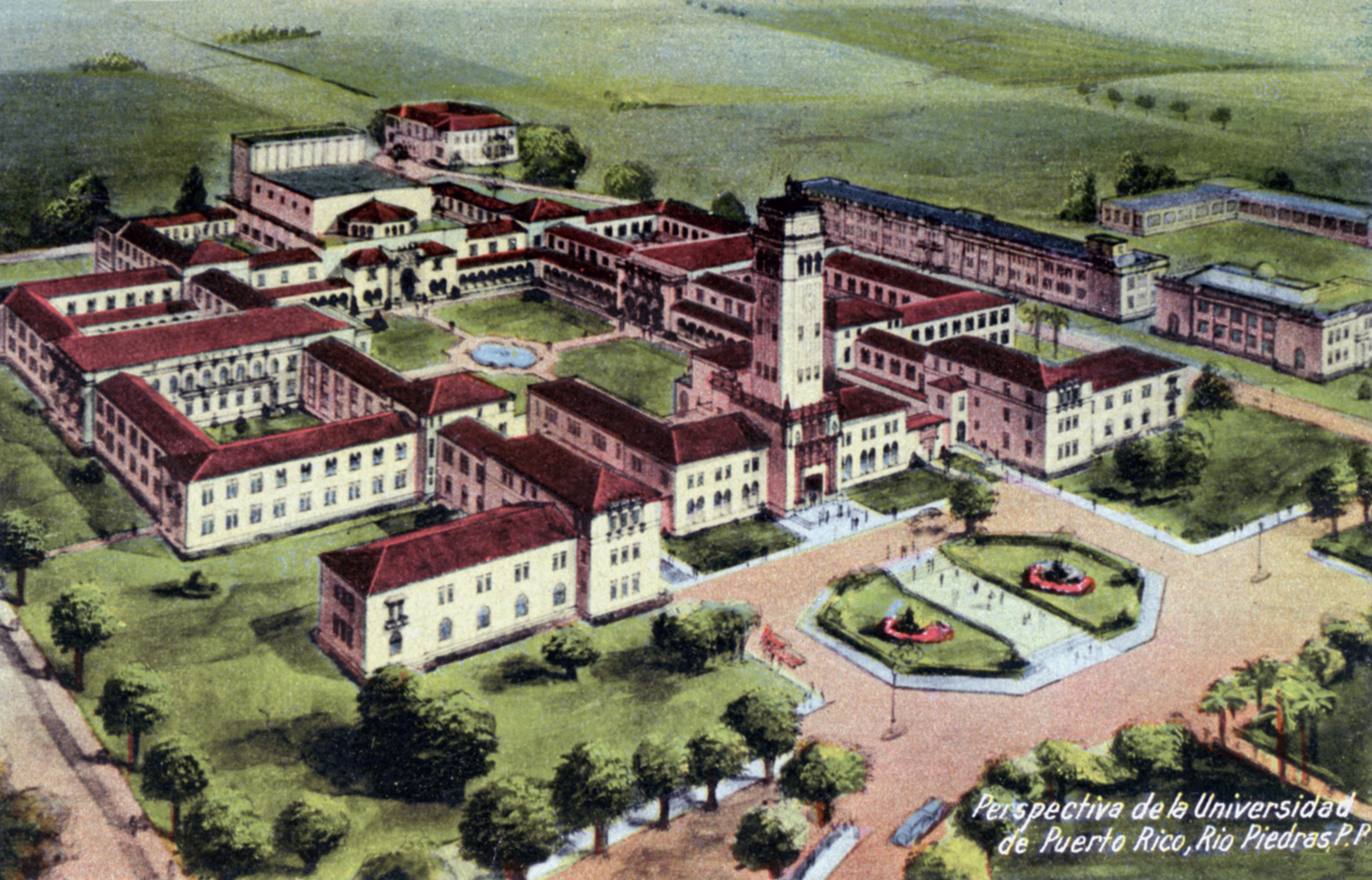
The University of Puerto Rico at Río Piedras campus, c. 1938

On September 22, 1913, the departments of Law and Pharmacology were established. The university at the time required only an eighth grade diploma, but with the expansion of its courses, this requirement changed. After 1917, the departments of Normal Education, Liberal Arts, Pharmacology, and Law required a high school diploma for admission.

On February 21, 1931, Dr. Carlos E. Chardón was appointed as chancellor of the university. During his tenure the university experienced significant growth in endowments. These were used in the expansion of the physical facilities at the Río Piedras and Mayagüez Campuses. This helped turn the university into a respected educational center. Chardón resigned from the post of Chancellor in 1936, being succeeded by Juan B. Soto. The most important part of this period was the expansion of the buildings of the university as part of a plan for the rehabilitation of Puerto Rico.

During the 1960s, the Serie de Cine de la Universidad de Puerto Rico was created. The institution created the Escuela de Comunicación Pública and began teaching classes in film studies.

=== History of student protests ===
The university was the site of social upheaval during the 1960s and 1970s, when nationalist students protested for civil rights, against the war in Vietnam, for the independence of Puerto Rico, and to expel the ROTC from the campus. In 1970 Antonia Martínez was murdered by the police during the anti-education reform and Vietnam War protests of that year. As the shouting started in the street, everyone in the building she was in, on Ponce de León Avenue, went to the balconies to see what was happening. She was, like many others, watching the events, saw policemen attacking at the students, and allegedly shouted at the police ¡Asesinos! ('assassins!'). A policeman turned and shot her in the head, killing her and injuring a roommate. A mural of her and her story existed on the College of Humanities, until administrative personnel covered it with paint. Other stories claim that she was shot by mistake. The students of the university also had a strike in the Spring of 2017 during which the school was shut down for several months.

== Campus and academic facilities ==
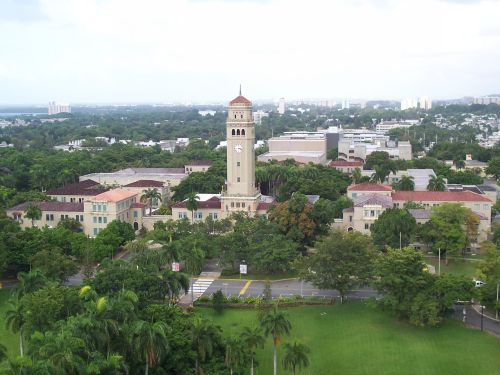
The University of Puerto Rico at Río Piedras campus, including its Roosevelt Tower, 2005

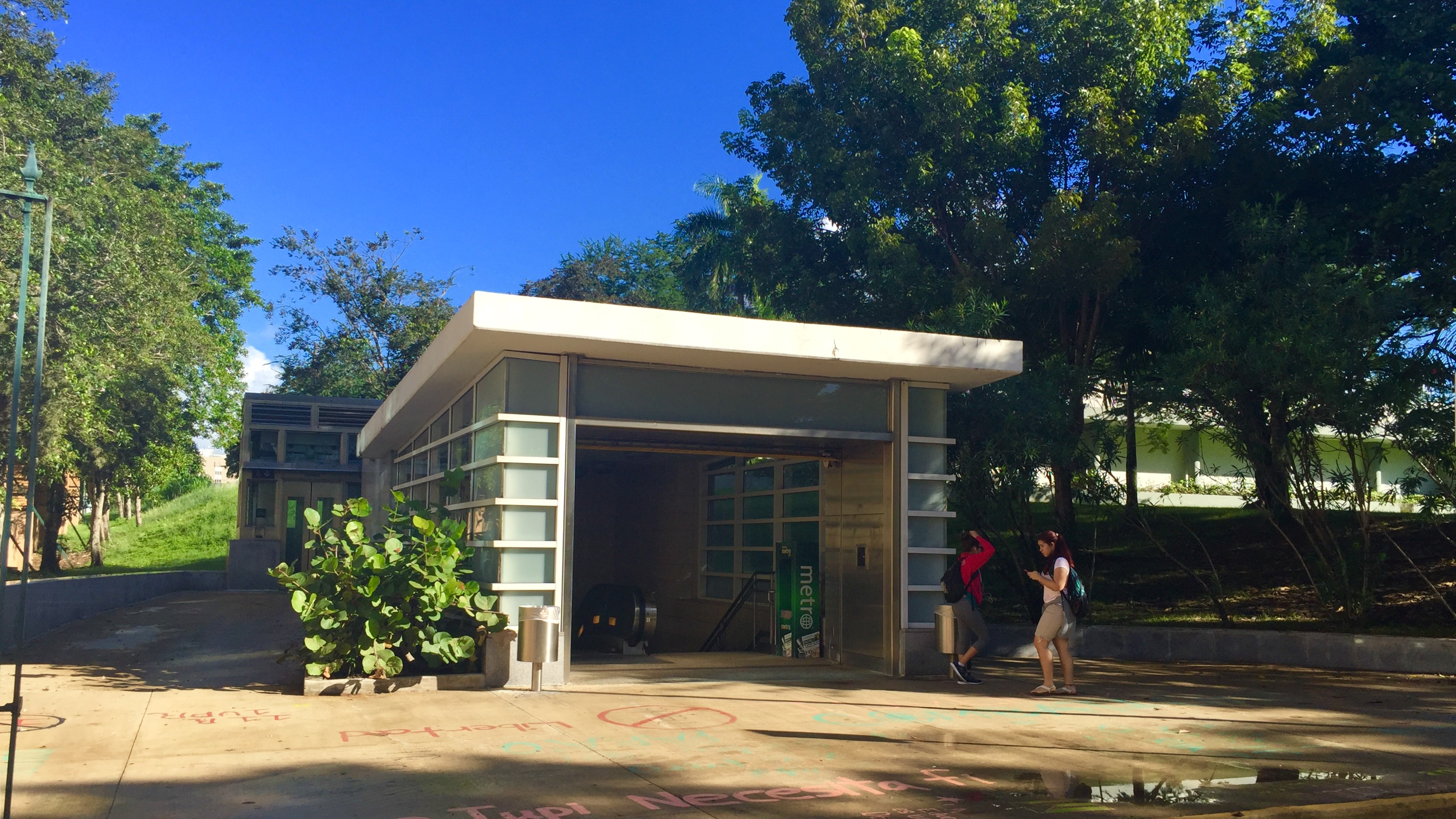
Universidad Tren Urbano station

The Río Piedras Campus is located in the northern end of the downtown area of Río Piedras, a former town but now a district (barrio) of San Juan, Puerto Rico. The campus is easily accessible via public transportation by means of the Tren Urbano metro system with a station (Universidad) located in campus, and the public bus system of San Juan (AMA). The campus is home to a rich diversity in architecture and urban planning with old and modern buildings that showcase the architectural development of the past 120 years in Puerto Rican architecture.

=== La Torre and the Quadrangle ===
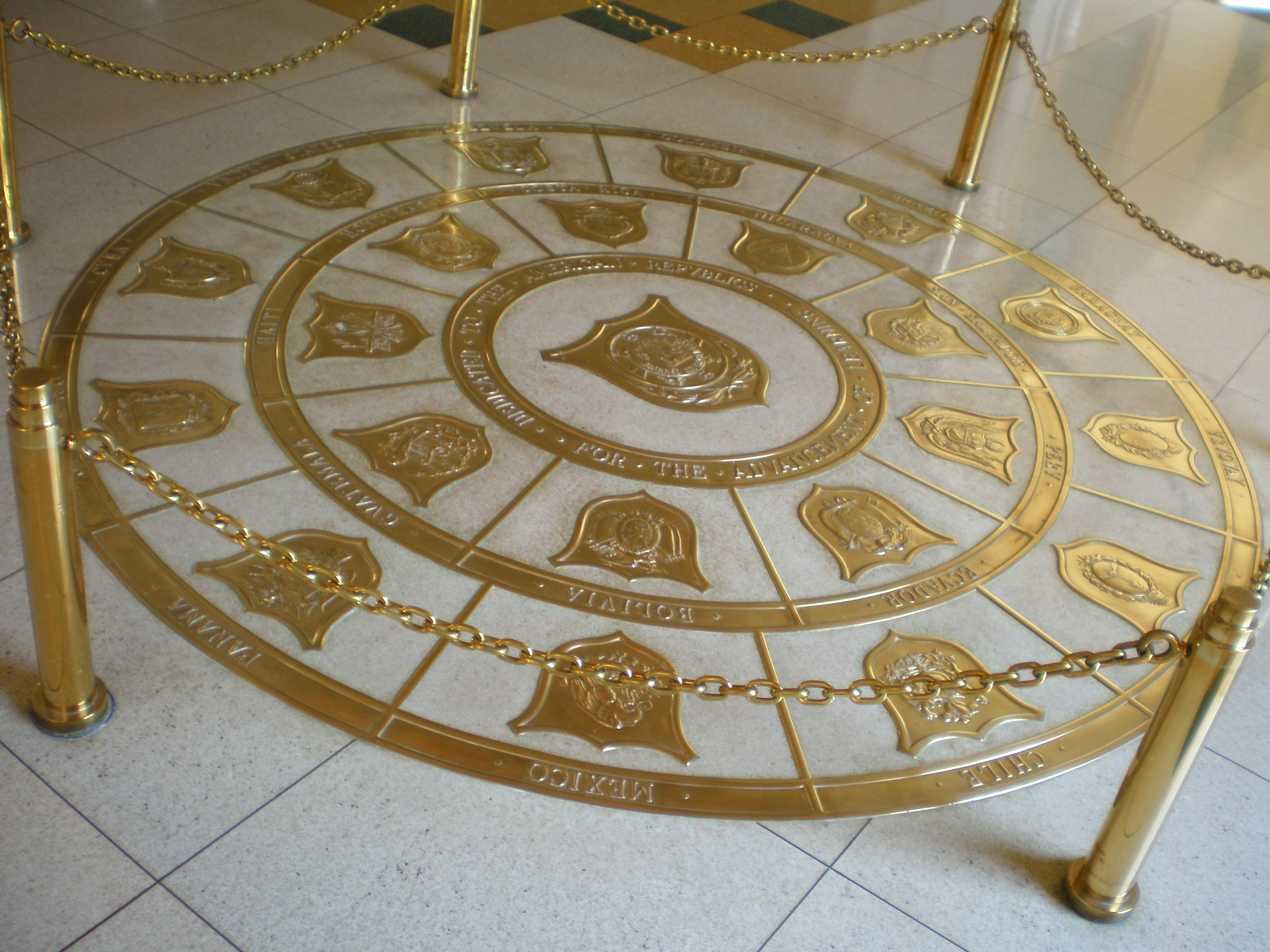
The Bronze Circle inside of La Torre (the Tower)

In 1936, architect Rafael Carmoega, working under the Puerto Rico Reconstruction Administration (PRRA), designed the distinctive University of Puerto Rico clock tower based on the 1924 Parsons Plan. The iconic university clock tower was built in 1937 and christened as the Franklin Delano Roosevelt tower, in honor of the president and his interest in the building of the university. La Torre (as The Tower is nicknamed in Spanish) is located at the entrance of the Román Baldorioty de Castro Building. Right below the tower there is a monument to the nations of the Americas portraying the coats of arms of all American states within a bronze circle, as a symbol of the Panamerican Union. Under the supervision of architect Rafael Carmoega, a group of local architects designed what is known as El Cuadrángulo (The Quadrangle), a plaza-like quadrangle. The campus's central quadrangle and tower were listed on the National Register of Historic Places in 1984.

=== Campus architecture ===
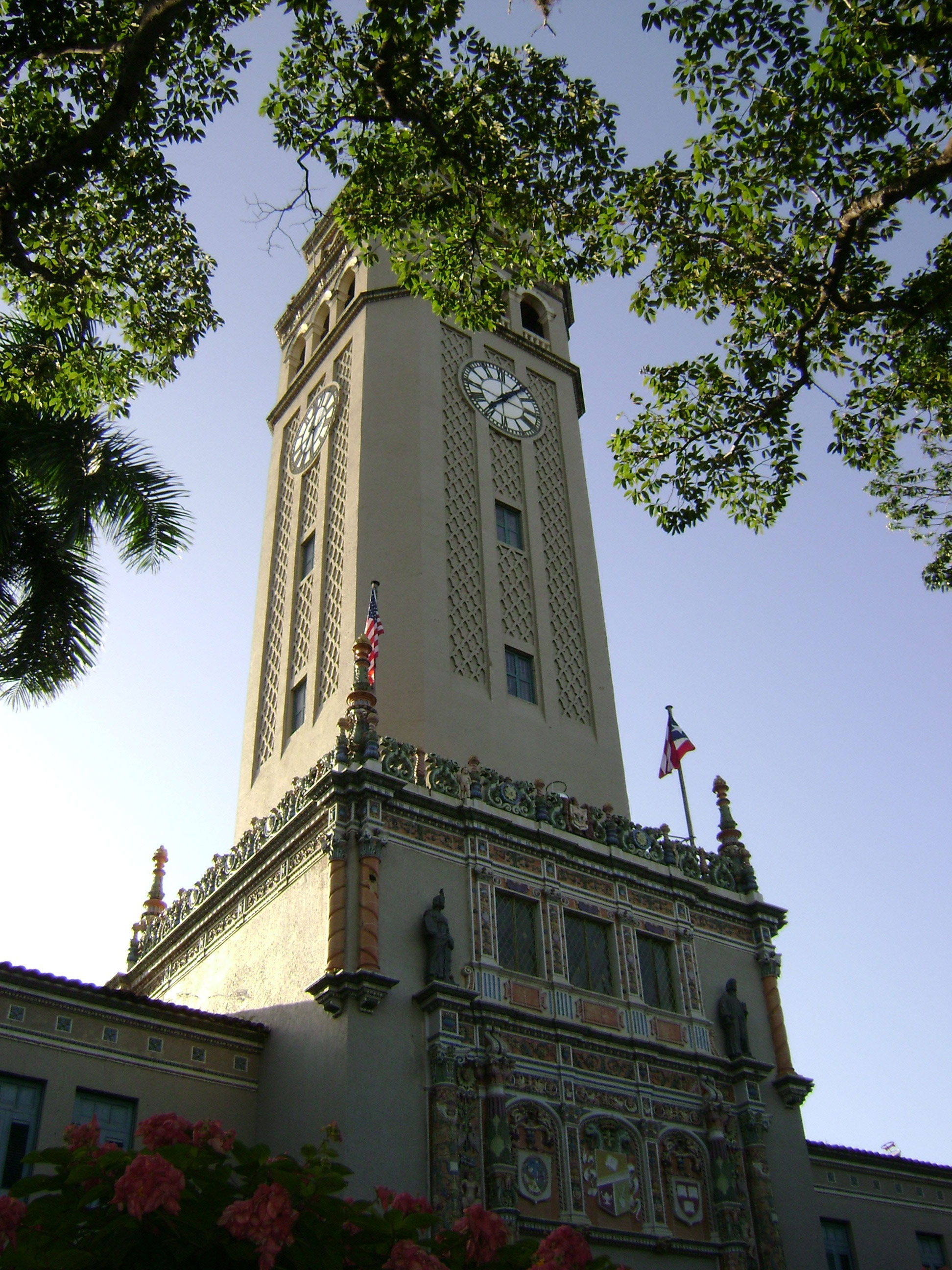
The iconic Roosevelt Tower in the campus's main building

The University of Puerto Rico was established in Río Piedras in 1903. The first buildings were the Normal School (1902), the Model School (1903), and the Principal's Residence (1903), next to the Central Road (today Ponce de Leon Avenue). Over the years, the development of the university occurred somewhat spontaneously. In 1908 the architectural firm of Clark, Howe and Homer designed a new façade for the Model School in the California Mission Style. In 1909 a milk processing building was constructed in an agricultural area, east of the academic center. Arts and Crafts' Workshop buildings, a Library and a Gymnasium were planned, as well as the grandstand and the fence (all demolished now). In 1912 construction began for the Memorial Hall (Baldorioty Building) and buildings for the Law School and the School of Pharmacy were in the works in 1918. In 1924 the Chicago firm of urbanists Bennett, Parsons and Frost were contacted to design a master plan for the future development of the university. It was not until 1935, with the establishment of the Puerto Rico Reconstruction Administration (PRRA) and the large sum of federal funds that it invested for public works in Puerto Rico, that the partial design and construction of the so-called Parson Plan began. However, from the 1940s onward a new architectural paradigm, which discarded historical vocabularies and incorporated attitudes learned from Germany and from the studio of Frank Lloyd Wright, stemmed from German émigré Henry Klumb. For 20 years Klumb was sole architect for the University of Puerto Rico, designing buildings for the campuses at Río Piedras and Mayagüez until in 1966. At that time chancellor Jaime Benítez assigned the design of the General Studies Building to the architectural firm of Toro & Ferrer. Other buildings for the university have been designed by architects Antonio Marqués Carrión (sports facilities, 1971); José Firpi (student residence Torre Norte, 1971); the firm of Reed, Torres, Beauchamp & Marvel (new Education Faculty Building, 1974 and the first expansion to the Faculty of Natural Sciences Building, 1978); the firm of García & Landray (second expansion the Faculty of Natural Sciences Building, 1989); GDO Arquitectos (School of Architecture Building, 2001) and Toro Ferrer (new General Studies Building, 2007).

In addition to La Torre and The Quadrangle, several buildings in the UPR-RP campus have been added to the National Register of Historic Places, such as the former female residence hall "Residencia de Señoritas" building which now houses administrative offices.

=== Library system ===
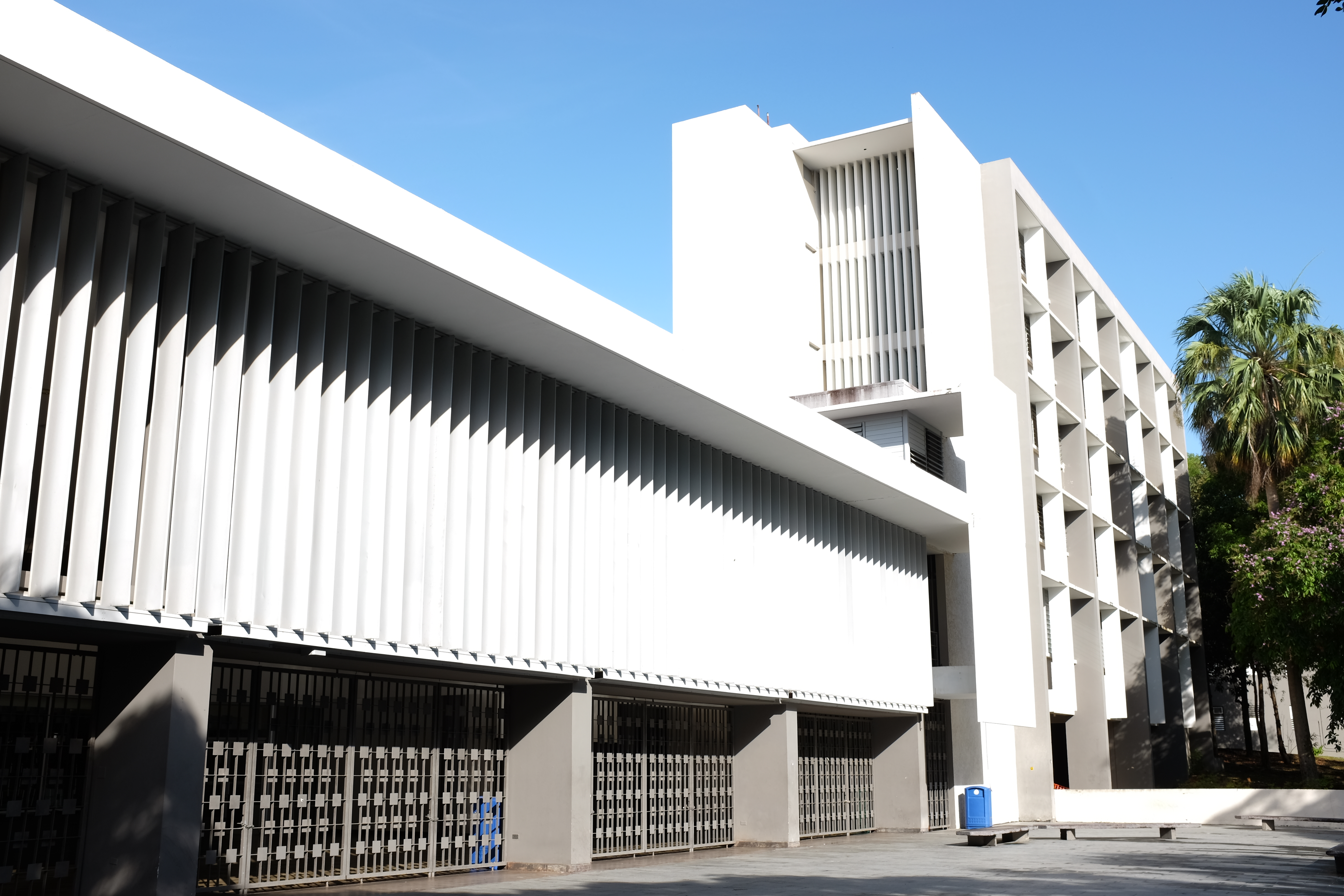
Student Center designed by Henry Klumb

The university library serves the research and teaching needs of the university community. It also extends its services to the Puerto Rican community at large. The system comprises eighteen specialized and general libraries, with holdings totaling more than 4,000,000 items, access to which may be gained through the university's online catalog. Of special interest are the Caribbean and Latin American Studies Library and the Puerto Rican Collection, both located in the José M. Lázaro Building.

In addition to the traditional library services, such as reference, circulation, reserves, photocopying, local interlibrary loan, and the compilation of bibliographies and acquisition lists, the Library System also participates in on-line interlibrary loans with many libraries worldwide. Other services include Dial Order, DIALOG, microfilming, reproduction of photographs, library instruction and orientation, lectures, and exhibits. The Integration of the Information Competencies to the Curriculum Projects promotes the development of information competencies around the campus. The Library System offers facilities for the blind and physically handicapped. The graduate and special collections in the Business Administration, Planning, Public Administration, Social Work, and Library Science programs are integral parts of the Library System, but the libraries of the School of Law, Natural Sciences Faculty, and the School of Architecture, also located on the university campus, operate independently.

=== Information system ===
The Information Systems Office serves the educational, research and administrative efforts of the institution. As a member of Internet2 and the Internet, the university enjoys instant communication with institutions all over the world for the purposes of correspondence and information access. Improvements to existing telecommunications infrastructure include the installation of structured cabling in campus buildings and fiber optics as a means of interconnecting them. Currently, campus buildings are configured to ATM (155Mbits / s) and Gigabit Ethernet interfacing equipment, providing greater capacity to transfer video, voice and data. The campus is capable of offering video conferencing over ATM (Asynchronous Transfer Mode), ISDN (Integrated Services Digital Network), or via the Internet in H.323 format.

=== University museums ===
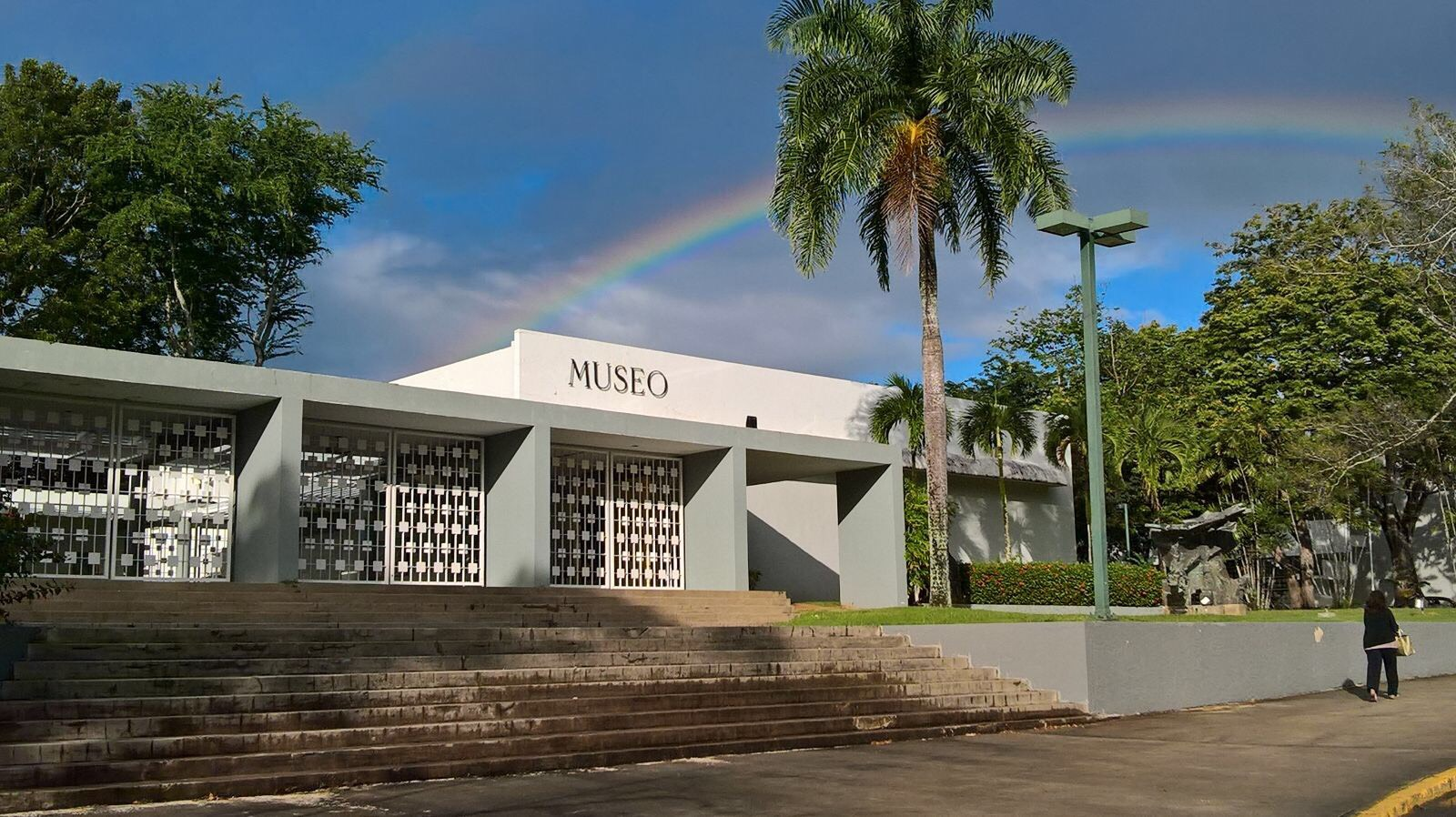
MAHA

The Museum of Art, History, and Anthropology (MAHA) was created in 1951 by legislative act to "complete and preserve our art, history, and anthropological heritage," as a means to educate and enrich our culture. The current building, designed by the architect Henry Klumb, was inaugurated in 1959. Since its establishment, the museum has actively contributed to the growth of Puerto Rican cultural life by holding art, historical, and anthropological exhibits and sponsoring lectures, seminars, publications, and workshops–to the benefit of both the academic and the general communities.

=== Housing ===
The Río Piedras campus provides housing in three residence halls:

- Torre del Norte (Currently Closed); a 22-story building located within a block of the campus. It has capacity to house 437 students in double and single units.
- ResiCampus; located within the campus consists of a structure of nine floors and have a capacity to house 354 students.
- Plaza Universitaria Residence Hall; administered by a private company in consortium to UPR; offers housing to undergraduate and graduate students.

There is also a Guest House within the Student Center, with rooms at affordable rates for visitors to the university, faculty, or students.

10% of first-year and 4% of all undergraduates live in college housing. No married student housing is available. Also, private housing is available in surrounding areas of the university.

== Organization ==
The Río Piedras Campus is a collegiate university. The Chancellor of the Campus is the top academic and administrative officer and presides over its two deliberative bodies: the Administrative Board and the Academic Senate.

=== Administrative Board ===
The Administrative Board, composed of the deans, two senators representing the faculty, and one student senator, advises the Chancellor in matters pertaining to the university program. The Board makes recommendations on leaves and faculty aid applications, and grants promotions and tenures.

=== Academic Senate ===
The Academic Senate, in turn, is the official academic forum. It is composed of the deans, the director of the library system, elected faculty representatives from all the colleges and schools, student senators, and representatives from the staff of academic advisors. Its members participate on the institutional processes, establishing academic rules and collaborating with other organisms of the University of Puerto Rico system.

=== Student Councils ===
The General Student Council (Consejo General de Estudiantes or CGE in Spanish) of the UPRRP is the elected student government of the campus. The council is composed of several representatives to the student council, elected by each School or College, the number of representatives varies depending on the number of students enrolled in the School or College, and the President and Senator of each School and College, for a total of around 50 members. Elections are held in April and representatives are elected for one year, from July 1 to June 30.

Having its origins in the 1920s, the Student Council was dissolved in 1948 while Jaime Benitez was chancellor, and under the council presidency of Juan Mari Brás and it was not until 1968 that the Student Council was re-installed under the name General Student Council and under the council presidency of David Noriega.

The General Student Council is governed by the Board of Directors, which is elected from among the council's members and is composed of:

- President
- Vice President
- Executive Secretary
- Press Secretary
- Public Relations Secretary
- Records Clerk

Additionally, they select Representatives to the Campus' Administrative Board and the university's University Board, both of them with an Alternate Representative. They are members of the board of directors.

Every College and School has a student council of its own, composed by a President, Vice President, Executive Secretary, Treasurer, Records Clerk, Public Relations Chair, the college or School's Student Senator (and, if available for the college/school, an alternate senator), Representatives to the General Student Council (up to four), and representatives of each department or subdivision present in the School or College.

=== Colleges organization ===
Colleges have a dean, an associate dean, assistant deans, department chairs, and other administrative directors. In August 2019, the president-elect of the College of Business Administration Student Council, Alberto J. Lebrón, established the university's first independent college board, founding the UPRRP College of Business Administration Directive Board, composed of two representatives from each of the college's associations and student council directives, with Lebrón serving as the board's first chairman. Each college also has several committees established; examples being the school or college's advisors committee, the curriculum committee, and the accreditation committee.

=== Deanery ===
The campus (and each school/college) has three administrative divisions known as a 'Deanery' or 'Dean's Office'. These include:

==== Deanery of Academic Affairs ====
Academic Affairs (DAA in Spanish, Decanato de Asuntos Académicos) promotes academic excellence, giving guidance and orientation for successful planning with the Campus Strategic Plan. It implants academic policies, and looks for the effective improvement of all personnel. It promotes and designs institutional research and coordinates accreditation processes. It evaluates the programs offered at the university, while trying to improve institutional effectiveness.

It is responsible for the suitable development of the services in the Libraries, Registrar, Admissions, and Continuing Education. It advises the Rector and the adequate units, such as the Administrative Council and the Academic Senate on the development of new politics, and efficacy of processes, planification, and academic decisions.

It is organized with a dean heading it, with the help of the Associate Dean and 3 Auxiliary Deans, each assigned a certain area of concern such as Foreign Students, General Studies, Business Faculty, the Library System, etcetera.

Three schools are under the Dean of Academic Affairs. These include the School of Communication, the Graduate School of Planning and the Graduate School of Informatic Sciences and Technologies and they are represented on the Administrative Board by the Dean of Academic Affairs.

==== Deanery of Student Affairs ====
The Deanery of Students is the leader organization, compromised with an ever-changing academic population. They try to bring the most advanced technological resources in order to be of help with respect to the services given to students.

Faculties included are:

- College of General Studies
- School of Architecture
- School of Communication
- School of Law
- School of Business Administration
- Graduate School of Business Administration
- Graduate School of Informational Sciences and Technologies
- Graduate School of Planning
- College of Natural Sciences
- College of Social Sciences
- College of Education
- College of Humanities

==== Deanery of Administration ====
The Deanery of Administration is the unit that offers essential services to the university community: it implements and guards for the proper fulfillment of the regulations that rule over administrative processes of the Campus and the entire University System. It plans, coordinates, evaluates and supervises labors related with different administrative and operative processes, but over all, they ensure quality services that have a positive aspect on student life, teaching and learning scenarios, investigation areas, labor areas of conformities, according to the Campus mission and the Public Administration that commands the university.

== Academics ==
The Campus serves more than 18,000 students, 20% graduate, and grants an average of over 3,000 degrees a year. From 2005 up to 2010 doctorate degrees conferred have maintained an upward trend. UPR‐RP has consistently granted the largest number of doctorate degrees to Hispanics in the US.

As a public comprehensive doctoral institution, its academic offerings range from the baccalaureate to the doctoral degree, through 70 undergraduate programs and 19 graduate degrees with 71 specializations in the basic disciplines and professional fields.

The graduate offer includes 12 PhDs, one Doctorate in Education, and international programs in Law, at both LLM and JD levels. The Campus frontier of knowledge production has been expanded during this period with the creation of a Master in Cultural Management and Administration in the College of Humanities, and Masters and PhD programs in Environmental Science, the PhD currently under consideration by the licensing board in PR, to be initiated in August, 2010. 56 academic programs are professionally accredited.

=== Research ===
The university is classified among "R2: Doctoral Universities – High research activity". It supports research centers and institutes including the Institute for Tropical Ecosystem Studies that conducts long term environmental research on Caribbean islands and similar tropical areas and is part of a global research network, and the Institute of Caribbean Studies (est. 1958) (which publishes the journal Caribbean Studies, ISSN 0008-6533) and the Institute of Psychological Research, among others.

=== Rankings ===
- UPRRP is ranked 220th in the U.S. in Biological Sciences in the 2011 edition of U.S. News & World Report.
- UPRRP is ranked 129th in the U.S. in Chemistry in the 2011 edition of U.S. News & World Report.

== Schools and colleges ==
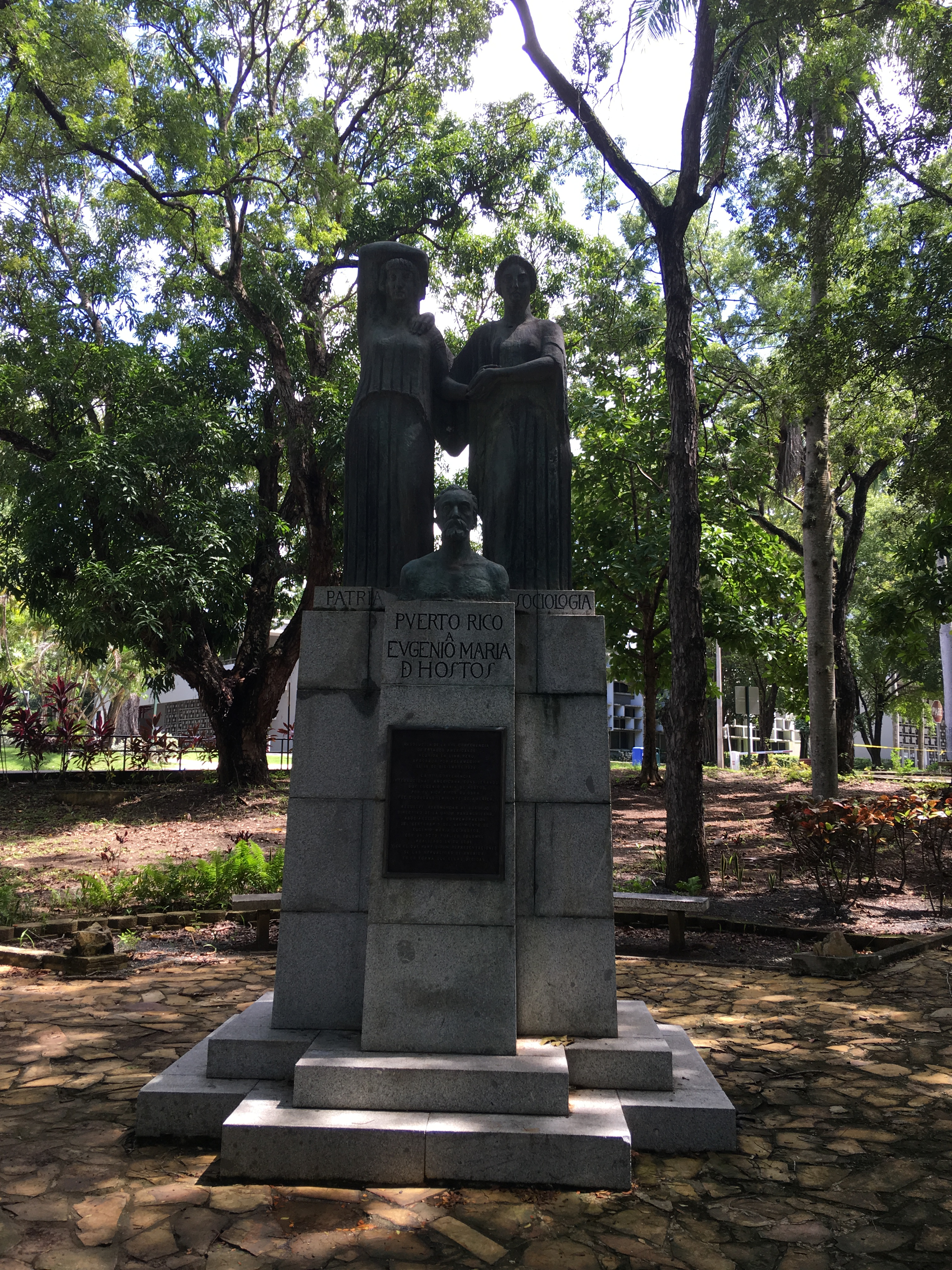
Monument of Eugenio María de Hostos at the campus

=== School of Architecture ===
The School of Architecture of the University of Puerto Rico offers a Bachelor of Environmental Design and a Master of Architecture. The Master of Architecture professional degree is offered by the School, accredited by the National Architectural Accrediting Board (NAAB). The UPR School of Architecture was established thanks to legislation approved in Puerto Rico in 1958 for such purpose. That same year and to that effect, Puerto Rican architect Santiago Iglesias Jr. presented a resolution at the annual convention of the American Institute of Architects, celebrated in Cleveland, Ohio. In 1965, Puerto Rican architect Jesús Eduardo Amaral, was selected as an executive consultant and given the responsibility to establish the school. Proposals were submitted to UPR's Río Piedras Chancellor Jaime Benítez and finally in 1966, the School was officially recognized by the Council of Superior Education.

=== College of Business Administration ===
The College of Business Administration, previously College of Commerce, was established on University of Puerto Rico, Río Piedras in 1926 with a roll of 70 students on a nocturnal program. From its beginning, it has offered preparation of university level in many areas of Business Administration. It also offers a bachelor's degree in administration of office systems, which substituted the secretarial sciences bachelor's degree.

In 1958 the Center for Commercial Investigations and for Academical Initiatives with the purpose of promoting investigation and contribute in the creation of knowledge in the area of Business Administration. Eventually, Cooperative Education, Link (Enlace), International Commerce Development and Enterprise Development programs, in order to have a narrower collaboration with business world.

In the academic year of 1970–71, the Graduated School of Business Administration began offering master's degree in Business Administration (MBA) making it the first of its kind in the Caribbean. In addition to master's degree the School offers altogether with Law School and the Doctoral Program of Business Management the MBA/JD Program which is built towards guidance on professional practice, whilst the Doctoral Program is orientated towards research.

Student enrollment in the College of Business Administration is approximately 2,800 undergraduates and 400 graduate students. This college enrollment is the third highest in the Río Piedras Campus. Nearly 530 Bachelor's degrees and 50 Graduate degrees are conferred annually. 63% of the students of the college are female, similar to the 67% of population of Río Piedras Campus being female.

In November 2013, the School of Business and the Graduate School of Business, became the first and only public study centers in business, accredited in Puerto Rico and Latin America by the prestigious Association to Advance Collegiate Schools of Business (AACSB).

=== Graduate School of Business Administration ===
The Graduate School of Business Administration (EGAE) educates aspiring entrepreneurs and business administrators.

=== School of Communication ===
The School of Communication (COPU, formerly known as Comunicación Pública in Spanish, from where the acronym comes COmunicación PUblica) was established in 1972 with a master's degree in public Communication. It offers bachelor's and master's degrees.

=== College of Education ===
The Eugenio María de Hostos College of Education (in Spanish Facultad de Educación Eugenio María de Hostos) is the biggest and oldest college of the University of Puerto Rico, founded on October 1, 1900, as the Normal School of Teachers (Escuela Normal para Maestros) in the Puerto Rican eastern city of Fajardo. The college has an estimate of 3,400 students who study in six different colleges of the university. The college headquarters are located in the New Building of Education in the south of the campus, and administrate nine buildings in all the campus, including a house in downtown Río Piedras district in San Juan.

The college moved to Río Piedras once the university was founded on March 12, 1903.

==== University High School ====
The University High School was built in the year 1913. It is currently operated by the Faculty of Education of the University of Puerto Rico. It currently has around 500 students from seventh to twelfth grade.

=== College of General Studies ===
The General Studies Division was created in 1943 and became a college in 1945. The creation of the general studies program was the cornerstone of the 1942 University Reform. Within the university's system, the college has the particularity of being constituted as a multi- and interdisciplinary one, wherein three great sections of knowledge converge: Humanities (including Vernacular Spanish, its literary and linguistic components), Social Sciences and Natural Sciences, and English for Academic Purposes, including its literary and linguistic components.

The College of General Studies offers these courses, which will vary depending on the requirements asked by the different Colleges the student heads to: Humanities, Spanish, English, Biological Sciences, Social Sciences, and Physical Sciences.

The main building of the College of General Studies is called Domingo Marrero Navarro, after one of its deans.

=== College of Humanities ===
Established in 1943, the faculty currently has about 2,000 students in the undergraduate program and about 300 students in its graduate program. This faculty offers undergraduate, graduate and doctoral degrees in various disciplines such as fine arts, drama, Hispanic studies, English, comparative literature, philosophy, history, modern languages, linguistics, music, translation, interdisciplinary studies, among others. It has various investigation centers, as well as seminars, specialized libraries in fine arts, philosophy, music and English, and publishes several educational magazines.

=== School of Law ===
The University of Puerto Rico School of Law is accredited by the American Bar Association.

=== College of Social Sciences ===
The College of Social Sciences (CISO, Ciencias Sociales in Spanish, from where the acronym comes CIencias SOciales) was established in 1943, with the mission of teaching universal knowledge on the social sciences, advancing the social comprehension of the nation.

The college offers undergraduate studies in the Departments of: anthropology, sociology, psychology, political science, social sciences (general), economics, social work, geography and labor relations.

The college offers graduate studies in the Departments of: rehabilitation counselling, public administration, social work, economics, sociology and psychology.

=== Graduate School of Planning ===
In April 1965, the Board of Education approved the establishment of the Graduate School of Planning (EGP), which commenced its first academic year in August the same year.

The program was funded with funds from the University of Puerto Rico and the Ford Foundation. The orientation of the curriculum was influenced by the dominant planning perspectives during the 1960s in the United States and the Economic Commission for Latin America. At this early stage, the Faculty had distinguished colleagues from Cornell University and other international institutions.

In addition, educators and researchers from across the island and abroad participated in the design and establishment of priorities of the curriculum. Areas of specialty include economic planning, regional, urban and social. Already in 1975 it established a new discipline of environmental planning.

- Regional and Urban Planning
- Social Planning
- Economic Planning
- Environmental Planning

=== Graduate School of Information Sciences and Technologies ===
The Faculty of Information Sciences and Technologies has the Master of Information Sciences which is accredited by the American Library Association (ALA).

- Master of Information Sciences
- Librarian Teacher Certificate (Post Baccalaureate)
- Certificate of Records and Archives Manager (Post Baccalaureate)
- Certificate Manager Academic and Special Libraries (Post Master)

=== Division of Continuing Education ===
Encompasses continuing education and professional studies offerings.

== Student life ==
=== Athletics ===
The University of Puerto Rico, Río Piedras is a founding member of the island-wide Inter-University Athletic League (LAI) and participates in all of the sports included in that organization. The university is also a member of the NCAA Division II as an Independent and competes in five men's and women's intercollegiate varsity sports: basketball, cross country, outdoor track, tennis, and volleyball.

=== Cultural activities ===
Students at Río Piedras may participate in cultural and social events organized by the university, in addition to academic conferences and lecture. Cultural Activities, run by the dean of students, is the central agency at Río Piedras that plans and sponsors major events on and off campus, with multiple events per week.

The Serie de Cine al Aire Libre runs every month throughout the school year, presenting classic and contemporary films in the Baldorioty de Castro Plaza in front of the Tower. Admission is always free.

There are indoor concerts by musical groups such as the Orquesta Filarmónica de Puerto Rico, the Tuna of UPR-Río Piedras, and the voice ensembles of the campus, Coro de la Universidad de Puerto Rico (founded in 1936 by Augusto Rodríguez), and Coralia, the concert choir.

=== Student organizations ===
Academic interests

- American Chemical Society (ACS)
- American Medical Student Association (AMSA)
- American Marketing Association (AMA)
- Society for Human Resources Management (SHRM UPRRP)
- Geography Students Association
- Graduate Biology Students Association (AEGB)
- Asociación Puertorriqueña de Estudiantes de Periodismo
- Accounting Students Association (AEC)
- Financial Management Association (FMA)
- Asociación de Estudiantes de Consejería en Rehabilitación
- Asociación de Estudiantes de Economía
- Asociación de Estudiantes de Estadística y Sistemas Computarizados de Información
- Asociación de Estudiantes de Comunicación Empresarial (COMCE)
- Asociación de Estudiantes de Trabajo Social
- Asociación de Estudiantes Escuela Graduada de Administración Pública
- Sociedad de Estudiantes de Física
- Asociación de Estudiantes de Ciencias de Cómputos
- Asociación Estudiantil de Pre-Veterinaria
- Asociación Premédica de Puerto Rico (APPR)

Environmental

- Sociedad Eco- Ambiental (SEA)
- CESAM

Religious

- Ministerio Cristiano La Escalerita
- Asociación Bíblica Universitaria

Political

- College Democrats
- Federación Universitaria Pro-Independencia
- Juventud Universitaria del Partido Independentista Puertorriqueño

=== Greek life ===
Social societies:

Fraternities

- Phi Eta Mu^{*}
- Phi Sigma Alpha^{*}
- Nu Sigma Beta^{*}
- Alpha Beta Chi^{*}
- Phi Delta Gamma^{*}

Sororities

- Mu Alpha Phi ^{*}
- Eta Gamma Delta^{*}
- Zeta Phi Sigma

* Member of Concilio Interfraternitario de Puerto Rico (Inter-Fraternity Council of Puerto Rico)

Greek-lettered service, professional and/or honor societies:

- Phi Alpha Delta - co-ed professional law fraternity
- Alpha Phi Omega ^{*} - co-ed service fraternity
- Psi Chi - honor society in Psychology

== Notable people ==
See List of University of Puerto Rico, Rio Piedras people

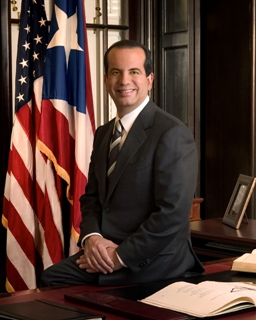
Aníbal Acevedo Vilá, (BA 1982, JD 1985), eighth governor of Puerto Rico (2005-2009), U.S. Representative (Resident Commissioner), D-Puerto Rico (2001-2004), State Representative, P.R. House of Representatives (1992-1999)

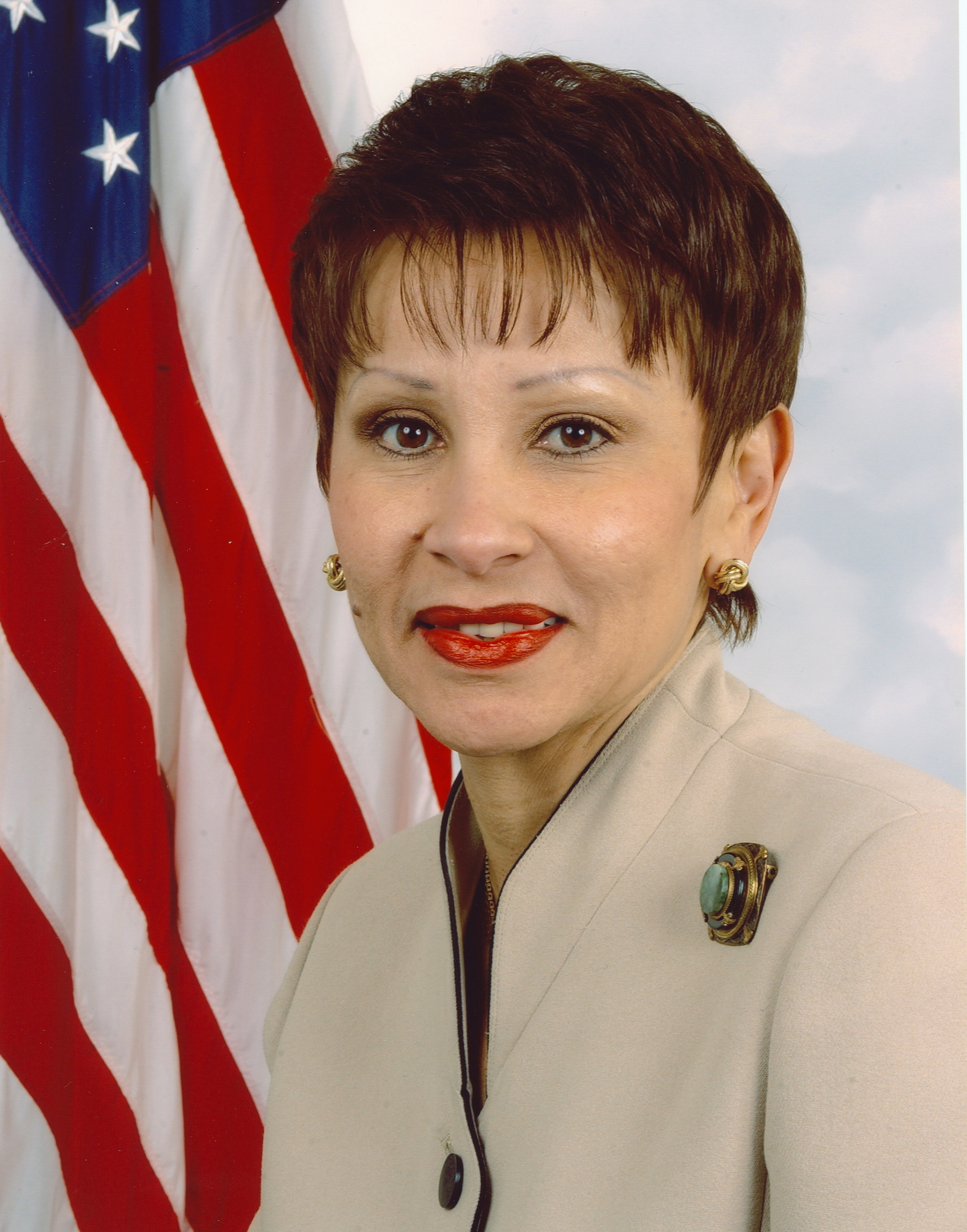
Nydia Velázquez (BA 1974), U.S. Representative, D-New York (1993–present)

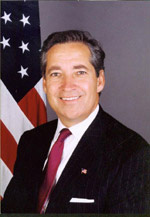
Hans Hertell (JD), U.S. Ambassador to the Dominican Republic, (2001-2007).

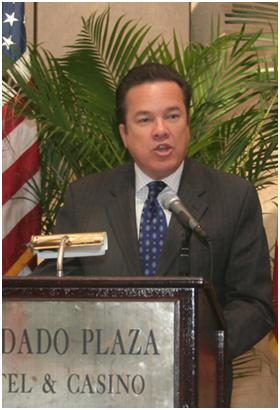
Kenneth McClintock (1960-1962 pre-elementary, 1962-1968 elementary, 1968-1974 high school, 1974-1977 undergraduate), 22nd Secretary of State of Puerto Rico, (2009–present), 13th President of the Senate of Puerto Rico, (2005-2008), State Senator, Senate of Puerto Rico, (1993-2008)

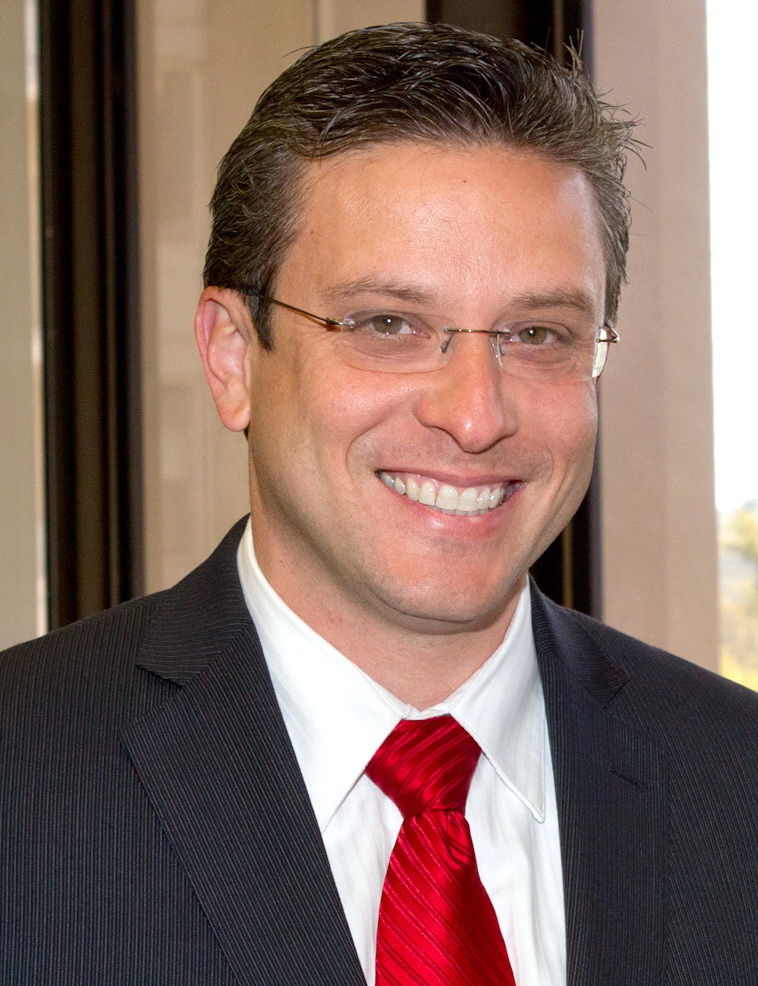
Alejandro García Padilla (BS), 11th governor of Puerto Rico (2013-2016)

== See also ==
- University High School (San Juan)
- 2010 University of Puerto Rico strike
- Río Piedras massacre
- Río Piedras
- School of Tropical Medicine
