= Sandra Rivera =

Puerto Rican actress and filmmaker (1935–2021)

- Born: Teodosia Rivera Robles; March 26, 1935; Fajardo, Puerto Rico
- Died: October 26, 2021 (aged 86); San Juan, Puerto Rico
- Other name: Sandra Rivera Robles y Teodosia Sandra Rivera Robles
- Education: Ornato Studios University of Puerto Rico Department of Drama (1956) Pasadena Playhouse College of Theater Arts (1958); Gene Frankel Studio (1968) The New Actors Workshop - Mike Nichols (1999)
- Occupations: Actress, producer and director
- Years active: 1950-2015
- Spouses: Carlos Rodríguez Orama (married 1956-1968); Xavier Cifré Tormos (married 1975-1997)
- Children: Edmundo H. Rodríguez Rivera; Gilberto A. Rodríguez Rivera; Sandra Teres Rodríguez Rivera
- Parents: Francisco Rivera; Isabel Robles
- Awards: Premio Agüeybaná for Theater Producer of the Year 1973-1974; Alejandro Tapia y Rivera Award for Best Theater Actress - 1984; ACE Awards NY for Producer - Best Documentary - 1980; Instituto de Puerto Rico in New York Lifetime Achievement Award for her work as an actress and producer in the Theater - 2003; Puerto Rico's House and Senate resolutions recognizing her lifetime achievements in the arts in 1994, 2003, 2004, and 2010

Sandra Rivera (March 26, 1935 – October 26, 2021) was a Puerto Rican actress, theater, television and film producer, director and writer. For 56 years she was also the artistic director of La Comedia Puertorriqueña, one of the island's leading theater companies founded by her in 1965.

== Early life and education ==
Sandra was born Teodosia Rivera Robles on March 26, 1935 in Fajardo, a town on Puerto Rico's east coast, to Francisco Rivera De Santiago, a grocery wholesaler and Isabel Robles De Santiago, homemaker. She was the fifth of seven children after siblings Flor de María, Santiago, Genoveva and Julio and followed by Olga and Alfredo.

Her love for the arts was evident at an early age. While attending elementary school, Sandra's dreams of becoming an actress were fueled by watching musical comedies at Fajardo's only movie theater and by reading about Eleonora Duse and Sarah Bernhardt, actresses who ran their own theater companies and inspired the young girl to do the same. Although her parents were reluctant to have a future actress in the family, it wasn't a complete surprise to them since Sandra's grandfather was an accomplished singing guitarist and her older cousins were professional dancers as well as formally trained pianists.

At the age of 13, Sandra, her parents and two younger siblings relocated to the Washington Heights neighborhood of Manhattan. Here, Sandra attended George Washington High School combining her studies with theater training at The Ornato Studios of The Modern Theater. As a teenager, she worked in Spanish language productions staged by companies of the nascent Hispanic theater movement of New York City, often performed at the Church of San Sebastian and at the Belmont and Master Institute theaters.

After graduating in 1953, she was accepted at the University of Puerto Rico's prestigious Department of Drama, modeled after the Yale School of Drama, presently known as the David Geffen School of Drama at Yale University. During her studies at the University of Puerto Rico, she performed in plays by Calderón de La Barca, Shakespeare, Lope de Vega, Molière, Maeterlinck, Lorca, Tennessee Williams, Salacrou, Anouilh and Puerto Rican playwrights. In addition to performing in classical and contemporary works, she studied ballet under Madame Herta Von Brauer.

The 1950s are considered by many to be the Golden Age of the University of Puerto Rico's Teatro Universitario. It trained and created the next generation of the country's theater, television, and film professionals. Sandra shared the stage with other famous actors such as Braulio Castillo, Samuel Molina, Elín Ortiz, Luis Rafael Sánchez, David Ortiz Angleró, Marcos Betancourt, as well as another three young actresses that would become her best friends for life: Velda González, Elga Avilés, and Myrna Vázquez.

Still an undergraduate student, she made her television debut in Teleteatro Telemundo's TV adaptation of The House of Bernarda Alba alongside established leading ladies of the national stage like Mona Marti, Iris Martínez, Marta Romero, Gladys Aguayo and Luz Odilia Font.

In her senior year she directed The Furious Sphinx by Spanish dramatist Juan Germán Schroeder, also taking over the role of Ana at the last minute when the leading actress fell ill. Upon completion of her B.A degree, she was awarded The University Of Puerto Rico's Presidential Scholarship to continue graduate studies abroad. Sandra submitted an application to the Accademia Nazionale D'Arte Drammatica Silvio d'Amicco in Rome because of her interest in Italian neorealism style. She also applied to the Pasadena Playhouse College of Theater Arts as her second choice, choosing to study at the California school in the end "because they replied first".

Sandra entered the Pasadena Playhouse in the fall of 1956. At the renowned school venue, she trained and performed alongside fellow students Gene Hackman, Dustin Hoffman and Henry Darrow. In 1958 Sandra received a master's degree in theater arts, also studying film and television production. She returned to Puerto Rico in 1961, where she continued to work in theater and television shows and soap operas.

In 1965, together with Carlos Marichal and Rafael Acevedo, she founded her own theater company, La Comedia Puertorriqueña inspired by the Comédie-Française, the oldest active theatre company in the world. For this new enterprise she produced and later starred in a significant number of world theater plays. The company's first season opened with Five Finger Exercise by Peter Shaffer followed by Champagne Complex by Leslie Stevens and later on, Federico García Lorca's Yerma, with her in the leading role.

From 1966 onwards, she was invited by the Performing Arts Division of the Institute of Puerto Rican Culture as a producer for its yearly International theater festivals. Williams' Cat on a Hot Tin Roof, Faulkner's Requiem for a Nun, Terence Rattigan's The Prince and the Chorus Girl and Eugene O'Neill's Anna Christie were some of her highly acclaimed productions which also garnered rave reviews for her performances.

In the early 1970s she anchored Women In The News, her own segment on the WKBM-TV morning news show as well as Sandra y su Matinée during which she presented movies and interviewed leading personalities in the world of politics, art, music, fashion and culture.

== New York once more ==
Searching for new career opportunities, Sandra established herself in New York City for a second stint from 1974 to 1982. While in the Big Apple, she taught at Fordham University and the City University of New York. She worked as a television producer for the show Infinity Factory on PBS and as a documentary producer for Rede Globo International TV. As an actress, she produced and played Juana in Dead Season staged at the Museum of Natural History Auditorium (now LeFrak Theatre). She later worked with the Hudson Theatre and Latin American Theatre Ensemble. She starred in the Puerto Rican Traveling Theater bilingual productions of The Oxcart and the world premiere of René Marqués play Death Shall Not Enter the Palace, which marked the opening of PRTT's new theater on Broadway.

== Back home ==
In 1981, she was offered a co-leading role in one Telemundo's prime time soaps, which prompted her move back to the island and her return to work in national television and the Puerto Rican stage.

From this period onwards, Sandra worked practically non-stop, delivering excellent performances in a variety of roles, best among them as M'Lynn Eatenton in Robert Harling's Steel Magnolias, Queen Joanna the Mad of Castile in The Madness of Love, and as Genoveva, a grandmother in her late eighties in Trees Die Standing by Alejandro Casona. For her riveting performance in the latter she was awarded the 1984 Alejandro Tapia y Rivera award for best actress, Puerto Rican theatre's most prestigious honor.

== The new century ==
Two of Sandra's proudest achievements as actress and producer was her theater company's Puerto Rican staging of Eve Ensler's The Vagina Monologues. Starring eight of Puerto Rico's grand dames of the stage, it broke attendance records as the play ran for ten consecutive weeks in San Juan. It then toured the island for an entire year, finally closing back in the capital in December 2002.

The other one was the 2010 Spanish-language world premiere of José Rivera's Boleros for the Disenchanted, at the Francisco Arriví Theater with the author in attendance.

That same year the country's International Theatre Festival was dedicated in her honor, recognizing her more than 50-year career on the stage.

In her later years, the actress added film production to her résumé, helming the movies La fuga (2010), Huey, Dewey, Louie And Three Girls In Pink (2013) and the TV movie adaptation of the play Actresses (2011).

She retired from the stage in 2013 after her last performance in the role of Gingy, in Nora Ephron and Delia Ephron's Love, Loss, and What I Wore at the San Juan Performing Arts Center (Centro de Bellas Artes).

In 2015 she suffered a debilitating stroke which left her paralyzed on one side and affected her speech. Nonetheless, she continued overseeing all aspects of her beloved theatre company as artistic director until her death in 2021. She was mourned as one of Puerto Rico's national treasures.

== Personal life ==
Sandra married Carlos Rodríguez Orama in Fort Ord, California on December 23, 1956. They were divorced on June 21, 1968. The couple had three children, Edmundo Héctor, (film director) Gilberto Adrián (writer) and Sandra Teres (actress and producer).

In 1975 she married theater producer Xavier Cifré Tormos in New York City. After 22 years the marriage ended in divorce.

== List of her work in theater ==
List of her work as actress and producer in theater
Year	Title	Role	Place	Notes
1950	Una luz entre dos sombras by Rolando Barrera	Mother	Master's Auditorium, New York City	Actress
1951	Diez años de amor by Rolando Barrera	Daughter	Teatro Gala, New York	Actress
1952	The Student's Sweetheart by Isabel Cuchí Coll	Nina	New York University	Actress
1953	The Bonds of Interest by Jacinto Benavente	Silvia	New York Belmont Theatre	Actress
1953	The Oxcart by René Marqués	Lidia	Hunts Point Palace, New York City	Actress
1953	Le Marguerite by Armand Salacrou	Marguerite	Teatro Universitario	Actress
1954	The Lady Simpleton by Lope de Vega	Nise	Teatro Universitario	Actress
1954	The Imaginary Invalid by Molière	Béline	Teatro Universitario	Actress
1954	The Life I Gave You by Luigi Pirandello	Isabel	Teatro Universitario	Actress
1954	The Oxcart by René Marqués	Lidia	Ateneo Puertorriqueño	Actress
1955	The Great Theater Of The World by Pedro Calderón de la Barca	Discretion	Teatro Universitario	Actress
1955	The Comedy Of Errors by Shakespeare	Luciana	Teatro Universitario	Actress
1955	The Lark by Jean Anouilh	Queen Yolande	Teatro Universitario	Actress
1955	The Blind by Maurice Maeterlinck	Mad blind woman	Teatro Universitario	Actress
1955	Summer And Smoke by Tennessee Williams	Mrs. Winemiller	Teatro Universitario	Actress
1955	If Five Years Come To Pass by García Lorca	The Bride	Teatro Universitario	Actress
1956	Moon Jellyfish In The Bay by Francisco Arriví	Tina	Teatro Universitario	Actress
1956	Antigone by Sophocles	Antigone	Pasadena Playhouse	Actress
1956	The View from the Bridge by Arthur Miller	Beatrice	Pasadena Playhouse	Actress
1956	The Adding Machine by Elmer Rice	Mrs. Zero	Pasadena Playhouse	Actress
1957	The Wild Duck by Ibsen	Gina Ekdal	Pasadena Playhouse	Actress
1957	Hamlet by Shakespeare	Gertrude	Pasadena Playhouse	Actress
1957	Les Précieuses Ridicules by Molière	Magdelon	Pasadena Playhouse	Actress
1958	The School for Scandal by Sheridan	Lady Sneerwell	Pasadena Playhouse	Actress
1958	Enemies Don't Send Flowers by Pedro Bloch	Silvia	Hotel Alexandria The Palm Court	Actress
1961	The Galloping Hero by Nemesio Canales	Amelia	Touring company, Puerto Rico	Actress
1964	The Setting Suns by René Marqués	Hortense	Teatro de Calatrava Salamanca, Spain	Actress
1965	Five Finger Exercise by Peter Shaffer	-	Teatro Salvador Brau Santurce, Puerto Rico	Producer
1965	Champagne Complex by Leslie Stevens	-	Teatro Salvador Brau Santurce, Puerto Rico	Producer
1965	Yerma by Federico García Lorca	Yerma	Teatro del Colegio de Abogados de Puerto Rico	Actress
1966	The Fox and the Grapes by Guilherme Figueiredo	-	Teatro Tapia	Producer
1966	Cat on a Hot Tin Roof by Tennessee Williams	Maggie	Teatro Tapia	Actress
1967	To Clothe the Naked by Luigi Pirandello	Ersilia Drei	Teatro Tapia	Actress
1968	My Elf Friend by Flavia Lugo Marichal	Marina	Touring company, Puerto Rico	Actress
1968	Requiem for a Nun by William Faulkner	Temple Stevens	Teatro Tapia	Actress
1968	Sirena by Francisco Arriví	Cambucha	Touring company, Puerto Rico	Actress
1969	Oh Dad, Poor dad, Mamma's Hung You in the Closet and I'm Feelin' So Sad by Arthur Kopit	Rosalie	Teatro Tapia	Actress
1970	You and Me Makes Three by Enrique Jardiel Poncela	-	Teatro Tapia	Producer
1971	The Prince and the Showgirl by Terence Rattigan	Mary Morgan	Teatro Tapia	Actress
1972	Trees Die Standing by Alejandro Casona	Isabel	Teatro Tapia	Actress
1972	Anna Christie by Eugene O'Neill	Anna Christie	Teatro Tapia	Actress
1972	Luv by Murray Schisgal	Ellen	Teatro Tapia	Actress
1973	The Fox and The Grapes by Guilherme Figueiredo	Cleia	Teatro Tapia	Actress
1975	Tiempo Muerto by Manuel Méndez Ballester	Juana	Museum of National History, New York City	Actress
1976	Where's My Little Gloria? by Hector Troy	Marifé Maldonado	Hudson Theater, New York City	Actress
1977	The Oxcart by René Marqués	Doña Gabriela	Puerto Rican Traveling Theater	Actress
1980	The Harlot of The Cave by Mario Peña	The Harlot	Latin American Theater Ensemble at El Portón	Actress
1981	Death Shall Not Enter the Palace by René Marqués	Doña Isabel	Puerto Rican Traveling Theater	Actress
1981	The Ball by Edgar Neville	Adela	Teatro Tapia	Actress
1982	OK by Isaac Chocrón	Mina	Centro de Bellas Artes	Actress
1984	The Baby Stroller by Norberto Aroldi	Rosa	Centro de Bellas Artes	Actress
1984	Trees Die Standing by Alejandro Casona	Genoveva	Teatro Tapia	Actress
1985	You and Me Makes Three by Enrique Jardiel Poncela	Manolita	Teatro Tapia	Actress
1986	Love Madness by Tamayo y Baus	Joanna of Castile	Centro de Bellas Artes	Actress
1988	The Quadroon by Alejandro Tapia y Rivera	The Countess	Teatro Tapia	Actress
1989	Steel Magnolias by Robert Harling	M'Lynn Eatenton	Centro de Bellas Artes	Actress
1989	The Gingerbread Lady by Neil Simon	Evy Meara	Teatro Tapia	Actress
1990	The Quadroon by Alejandro Tapia y Rivera	The Countess	Centro de Bellas Artes	Actress
1991	Las amantes pasan el año nuevo solas by Roberto Ramos Perea	Eva	Teatro Tapia	Actress
1992	La sirena varada by Alejandro Casona	-	Teatro Tapia	Producer
1994	The House Must Be Dismantled by Sebastián Junyent	Laura	Centro de Bellas Artes	Actress
1995	Beyond Therapy by Christopher Durang	Charlotte	Teatro Yagüez	Actress
1996	Love Letters by A. R. Gurney	Melissa Channing Gardner	Touring company, Puerto Rico	Actress
1999	Actresses by Josep M. Benet i Jornet	Gloria Marc	Teatro Tapia	Actress
2000	The Dance of Death by August Strindberg	Alice	Centro de Bellas Artes	Actress
2001	Cloud Tectonics by José Rivera	-	Centro de Bellas Artes	Producer
2001	The Vagina Monologues by Eve Ensler	Ensemble/Herself	Centro de Bellas Artes	Actress/Producer
2003	Proof by David Auburn	-	Centro de Bellas Artes	Producer
2010	Boleros for the Disenchanted by José Rivera	Milla/Flora	Teatro Francisco Arriví	Actress
2011	Eurydice by Sarah Ruhl	-	Teatro Victoria Espinosa	Producer
2011	Señora Carrar's Rifles by Bertolt Brecht	Sra. Pérez	Teatro Francisco Arriví	Actress
2013	Love, Loss, and What I Wore by Nora Ephron and Delia Ephron	Gingy	Centro de Bellas Artes	Actress
2015	Red by John Logan	-	Centro de Bellas Artes	Producer

== List of her work as a director ==
List of her work as a director in theater
Year	Title	Place	Notes
1956	The Furious Sphinx by Juan Germán Schroeder	Teatro Universitario	Director
1957	Biography by S. N. Behrman	Pasadena Playhouse	Director
1957	The Shoemaker's Holiday by Thomas Dekker	Pasadena Playhouse	Director
1958	Death Takes A Holiday by Alberto Casella	Pasadena Playhouse	Director
1958	The Trojan Women by Euripides	Pasadena Playhouse	Director
1958	Yerma by Federico García Lorca	Pasadena Playhouse	Director
1961	The House Without a Clock by René Marqués	Ateneo Puertorriqueño	Director
1961	La familia de Justo Malgenio by Isabel Cuchí Coll	Teatro Tapia	Director
1962	The Farce of Master Pierre Patelin by Anonymous	UHS	Director
1986	Tú, mi pasión by Franciso Arriví	Centro de Bellas Artes	Director
2007	Tú, mi pasión by Franciso Arriví	Teatro Francisco Arriví	Director

== List of her work in television ==
List of her work as an actress and host in television
Year	Title	Role	Network	Notes
1956	Aquella extraña mujer	-	Telemundo Soap opera	Actress
1956	Contraespionaje	-	Telemundo TV series	Actress
1962	La otra orilla del río	Dulce	Telemundo Soap opera	Actress
1964	Concierto de amor	Miriam	Telemundo Soap opera	Actress
1971 - 1974	Sandra y su matinée / Sandra y su matinal	-	WKBM-TV	Host
1971 - 1974	Mujeres en las noticias	-	WKBM-TV	Anchor
1971 - 1974	Vitrina del hogar	-	WRIK-TV	Host
1981	Maria Eugenia	Yadira	Telemundo Soap opera	Actress
1984	¿De qué color es el amor?	Clotilde	Telemundo Soap opera	Actress
1986	La muerte de un viajante by Arthur Miller	Linda Loman	WAPA-TV	Actress
1986	Preciosa	Migdalia	Telemundo Soap opera	Actress
1986	La cárcel de todos	-	WRIK-TV Miniseries	Actress
1987	Plaga o destino	-	WAPA-TV Miniseries	Actress
1988	Tormento	Marcelina	WAPA-TV Soap opera	Actress
1989	El papá de mi papá	The wife/The grandma	WAPA-TV Sitcom	Actress

== List of her work in film ==
List of her work as an actress and producer in film
Year	Title	Role	Notes
1964	El hombre esperado	Felicia	Puerto Rican Division of Community Education DIVEDCO
1980	A Tribute to Pedro Flores	-	Producer TV Globo Internacional TVGI
1983	Papo	Mami	Ibis Filmworks, New York
1992	Chavez Ravine	Ensemble	Universal Pictures
1996	Una noche en Hollywood	-	Producer Pasadena Films
2009	Desamores	Lucía de Leyva	Propaganda PR
2010	La fuga	-	Producer Pasadena Films
2013	Huey, Dewey, Louie And Three Girls In Pink	-	Producer Pasadena Films
