= Madness for Love =

1948 film

- Screenshot from film
- Spanish: Locura de amor
- Directed by: Juan de Orduña
- Based on: The Madness of Love by Manuel Tamayo y Baus
- Produced by: Carlos Blanco; Alfredo Echegaray; José María Pemán
- Starring: Aurora Bautista; Fernando Rey; Sara Montiel; Jorge Mistral; Jesús Tordesillas; Manuel Luna
- Cinematography: José F. Aguayo
- Edited by: Juan Serra
- Music by: Juan Quintero
- Production company: CIFESA
- Distributed by: CIFESA
- Release dates: 8 October 1948 (Spain); 26 October 1950 (US)
- Running time: 112 minutes
- Country: Spain
- Language: Spanish

Madness for Love (Spanish: Locura de amor) is a 1948 Spanish historical drama film directed by Juan de Orduña.

The movie is based on the play The Madness of Love written in 1855 by Manuel Tamayo y Baus around the figure of Queen Joanna of Castile; who attracted authors, composers, and artists of the romanticist movement, due to her characteristics of unrequited love, obsessive jealousy, and undying fidelity.

The film is also known as The Mad Queen. It was made by CIFESA, Spain's largest film company at the time, which turned out a number of historical films during the late 1940s. It was given an American release in 1950.

In 2001, Vicente Aranda made a remake titled Juana la Loca.

== Plot summary ==
The story of Queen Joanna of Castile, known as "Juana la loca," and her husband Philip I of Castile, also known as "Philip the handsome."

== Cast ==
- Aurora Bautista as Doña Juana
- Fernando Rey as Felipe el Hermoso
- Sarita Montiel as Aldara
- Jorge Mistral as Capitán Don Alvar
- Jesús Tordesillas as Don Filiberto de Vere
- Manuel Luna as Don Juan Manuel
- Juan Espantaleón as Almirante
- Ricardo Acero as Don Carlos
- María Cañete as Doña Elvira
- Manuel Arbó as Marlian
- Félix Fernández as Mesonero
- Arturo Marín as Chieves
- Luis Peña Sánchez as Noble
- Conrado San Martín as Hernán
- José Bódalo
- Eduardo Fajardo as Marqués de Villena
- Carmen de Lucio as Amante del archiduque Felipe
- Nicolás D. Perchicot as Pintor en la corte de Flandes
- Mercedes Serrano as Doña Leonor

== Bibliography ==
- Mira, Alberto. Historical Dictionary of Spanish Cinema. Scarecrow Press, 2010.
