= María Teresa Babín Cortés =

Puerto Rican educator (1910–1989)

- Born: May 30, 1910; Ponce, Puerto Rico
- Died: December 19, 1989 (aged 79); San Juan, Puerto Rico
- Occupations: educator, literary critic, and essayist.
- Writing career
- Subject: Puerto Rican Culture
- Notable work: Panorama de la Cultura Puertorriqueña

María Teresa Babín Cortés (May 30, 1910- December 19, 1989) was a Puerto Rican educator, literary critic, and essayist. She also wrote poetry and plays. Among her best-known works is Panorama de la Cultura Puertorriqueña and several essays on Federico García Lorca.

== Early years ==
Babín Cortés was born in Ponce, Puerto Rico on May 30, 1910, daughter to Emmanuel Babín Satgé, from Guadeloupe and Joaquina Cortés Marrero, of Santa Isabel, Puerto Rico. Her first years were spent learning French from her father. She also experienced numerous moves, as her father was a chemist who worked at various of the sugar cane mills of Puerto Rico.

== Training ==
She attended elementary school in Yauco and graduated from Ponce High School. She was the Valedictorian of her graduating class. She graduated in 1931 from the University of Puerto Rico, Río Piedras, with a B.A. in Education, and a concentration in Spanish. She earned a Masters in 1939. The title of her Master's research was "Federico García Lorca y su vida". She taught Spanish and French at the Coamo, Isabela, and San Juan (Central) high schools. In 1951, she earned a Ph.D. from Columbia University in New York City. The title of her thesis was "El mundo poético de Federico García Lorca". It was published in 1954.

== Career ==
=== Puerto Rico ===
From 1935 to 1937, she was director of the Comité de Producción de la Escuela del Aire of the Puerto Rico Department of Public Instruction. Upon completing her Masters, she was named Director of the Department of Spanish at the University of Puerto Rico, Rio Piedras, where she performed from 1940 to 1945.

=== United States ===
She was a high school teacher in Easton, Pennsylvania and at Garden City High School in Long Island. She was also a university professor at the Department of Romance Languages in Hunter College of New York (1946–51), Associate Professor of Language and Literature at Washington Square College in New York. She also tutored Jacqueline Kennedy Onassis in her learning of the French language. She was also “Cultural Aide” to Gov. Nelson A. Rockefeller in New York.

=== Puerto Rico, again ===
In 1962, Babín Cortés returned to Puerto Rico. She was named Coordinator of the Special High School program and Director of the Spanish program of the Puerto Rico Department of Public Instruction (1963–1966). The first list of Puerto Rican textbooks was added to the curriculum during her directorship. She then became professor at the University of Puerto Rico, Mayaguez (1966–69) in the Department of Hispanic Studies. She implemented the Masters program in Hispanic Studies there.

=== United States, again ===
She returned to New York and worked as Special Consultant to the Ford Foundation, involved in their minority students scholarships program (1969–73). She was also a member in the Cultural Board of the City of New York. She was invited by Lehman College of the City University of New York to implement a program on Puerto Rican Studies. She was a professor as well as founder, and director of the Department of Puerto Rican Studies at Lehman. She was also a professor in the doctoral program of CUNY School of Graduate Studies, and dean of the CUNY Graduate School.

=== Last return to Puerto Rico ===
She returned to Puerto Rico and took up a position as professor of Puerto Rican Literature at the Centro de Estudios Avanzados de Puerto Rico y el Caribe (1977–1983) and as visiting professor the San Juan campus of the InterAmerican University of Puerto Rico and the University of Puerto Rico, Rio Piedras (1983–85). After the death of her mother and husband, she retired. Maria Teresa died on December 19, 1989.

== Awards ==
- Professor emeritus status at Lehman College in 1978.
- Doctor Honoris Causa by The University of Puerto Rico in 1984.

== Books written ==
The following books were written by Babin Cortes:

- Introducción a la cultura hispánica (1949)
- Fantasía Boricua (1956)
- Panorama de la cultura puertorriqueña (1958)
- La antología prologada de Francisco Gonzalo Marín (1958)
- Ser y estar de Puerto Rico (1964)
- Jornadas literarias (1967)
- Siluetas literarias (1967)
- La gesta de Puerto Rico (1967)
- La cultura de Puerto Rico (1970)
- The Puerto Rican's Spirit (1971)
- Estudios Lorquianos (1976)
- Federico García Lorca, cincuenta años de Gloria (1986)
- El hilo de Ariadna (n.d.)

In the world of poetry, she produced:

- Las voces de tu voz (1962)
- La barca varada (1982)
- La hora colmada (1960) (theatrical fabule)

She also produced numerous critical reviews of Miguel Meléndez Muñoz, Fernando Sierra Berdecía, Manuel Méndez Ballester, René Marqués, Emilio S. Belaval, Julia de Burgos, Luis Palés Matos, Evaristo Ribera Chevremont, among others.

== Legacy ==
She has been recognized as one of Ponce's greatest writers at the Park for Illustrious Ponce Citizens.

== See also ==
- List of Puerto Ricans
