= Luis Daniel Rivera =

Luis Daniel Rivera may refer to:

- Luis Daniel Rivera (politician)
- Luis Daniel Rivera (actor)
