= Leopoldo Santiago Lavandero =

Puerto Rican playwright

- Born: September 21, 1912; Guayama, Puerto Rico
- Died: March 30, 2003 (aged 90); North Port, Florida
- Occupations: radio narrator and director, playwright, theater producer and acting teacher

Leopoldo Santiago Lavandero (September 21, 1912 – March 30, 2003) was a Puerto Rican radio narrator and director, playwright, theater producer and acting teacher. Santiago Lavandero is considered to have been instrumental in discovering some of Puerto Rico's most famous acting legends, such as Adrian Garcia, Luz María Rondón and Luis Daniel Rivera.

== Early life ==
Born in the southern Puerto Rico city of Guayama, Santiago Lavandero moved as a young boy to Bayamon, in the Caribbean country's north.

In 1935, at age 23, Santiago Lavandero graduated from the University of Puerto Rico, with degrees in science and chemistry. In 1936, Santiago Lavandero traveled to the United States, where he enrolled at the Yale University's Laser Galpern's "New Theater School". He also studied folklore under Federico de Onís and theater teaching techniques under Milton Smith. Santiago Lavandero acted in Argentine actor Enrique de Rosas' theater company and supplemented his income as an acting educator at a children's summer camp in New Hampshire.

== Theatrical and teaching career ==
Santiago Lavandero returned to Puerto Rico in the early 1940s, where he started organizing a number of theatrical plays, such as "He Vuelto a Buscarla" ("I've Returned to Look for Her"), "Tiempo Muerto" ("Dead Time") "La Escuela del Buen Amor" ("The School of Good Love") and many other plays. These plays were produced by Santiago Lavandero and by Emilio Belaval under their theater company, named "Areyto".

In 1941, Santiago Lavandero became an acting teacher at Universidad de Puerto Rico, eventually organizing that educational institute's drama department. He was also a scenographer and designer, in charge of preparing scenography for the university's plays. One of his former students at this time was Victoria Espinosa.

Santiago Lavandero then became a director for various drama shows that were shown on WKAQ AM, a leading radio station in Puerto Rico.

Meanwhile, he began traveling the island to discover new talents for his shows. As a talent developer, he, along with Francisco Arrivi Alegria, discovered comedian Adrian Garcia during a trip to western Puerto Rico. He was also instrumental in the career of one of his students, Luz María Rondón and of Luis Daniel Rivera.

Some of the radio shows that Santiago Lavandero directed on the radio were sponsored by the Colgate Palmolive consumer goods company. Santiago Lavandero around that era also held benefits for soldiers serving at World War II.

During 1960, Santiago Lavandero first became involved in organizing plays directed towards children, when he was part of a group of people who created the Puerto Rico Department of Education's "Teatro Escolar" program. He then helped create "Teatro Rodante" ("The Road Theater"), a moving-theater program which took plays across Puerto Rico.

== Personal life and death ==
Santiago Lavandero retired in 1977 and he moved to the United States, living in Florida until he died at North Pont on March 30, 2003, after suffering from Alzheimer's disease.

== See also ==
- List of Puerto Ricans
