= Rafael Acevedo =

Rafael Acevedo may refer to

- Rafael Acevedo (cyclist) (born 1957)
- Rafael Acevedo (writer) (born 1960)
