= Mad Love (2001 film) =

2001 film by Vicente Aranda

- Theatrical release poster
- Spanish: Juana la Loca
- Directed by: Vicente Aranda
- Written by: Vicente Aranda
- Based on: The Madness of Love by Manuel Tamayo y Baus
- Produced by: Enrique Cerezo
- Starring: Pilar López de Ayala; Daniele Liotti; Rosana Pastor; Giuliano Gemma; Eloy Azorín
- Cinematography: Paco Femenia
- Edited by: Teresa Font
- Music by: José Nieto
- Production companies: Enrique Cerezo PC; Pedro Costa PC; Production Group; Sogepaq; Take 2000
- Distributed by: Warner Sogefilms (Spain); Columbia TriStar Films Italia (Italy)
- Release dates: 24 September 2001 (San Sebastián); 28 September 2001 (Spain)
- Running time: 115 minutes
- Countries: Spain; Italy; Portugal
- Language: Spanish
- Box office: €8,895,196

Mad Love (Spanish: Juana la Loca; lit. 'Joanna the Mad') is a 2001 period drama film written and directed by Vicente Aranda starring Pilar López de Ayala and Daniele Liotti. The plot follows the tragic fate of Queen Joanna of Castile, madly in love with an unfaithful husband, Philip the Handsome, Archduke of Austria. It is one of the several adaptations of Manuel Tamayo y Baus' 1855 historic drama The Madness of Love.

The film received three Goya awards, in the categories of Best Actress, Best Wardrobe, and Best Makeup and Hair. It was selected as the Spanish entry for the Best Foreign Language Film at the 74th Academy Awards, but it was not nominated.

== Plot ==
Tordesillas, 1554. Seventy-four years old, Queen Joanna of Castile, called Joanna the Madwoman, still mourns her husband who died a half-century before. Joanna remembers with emotion the man she loved passionately, but who brought her ruin. She does not fear death, she says, because death would reunite her with him. Their story goes back almost 60 years.

In 1496, Joanna, third child of the Catholic Monarchs Ferdinand II of Aragon and Isabella I of Castile, is leaving Spain. She is headed to Flanders to marry the Archduke of Austria, Philip, nicknamed the Handsome, a man she has never seen. The marriage has been arranged for political purposes. Joanna's siblings and her mother, Queen Isabella, bid her farewell.

In Flanders, Joanna, young and inexperienced, is immediately smitten by her fiancé. He is equally pleased with his beautiful bride and orders the marriage to take place instantly so they can consummate it straightaway. Their union is initially a great success. The political alliance between their two countries has been consolidated and Joanna and Philip are very attracted to each other. Their passionate sex soon produces results. Joanna has a daughter, followed shortly by a son. Her love for her husband becomes consuming, but the intensity of her passion turns Philip away. He is a restless man who finds entertainment in hunting and in other women. Several family deaths unexpectedly make Joanna heir of the Castilian and Aragonese crowns. However, she is not interested in government. Obsessed with her husband, Joanna surprises him in bed with a lover; in a fit of jealousy, Joanna cuts her rival's hair. While Joanna despairs at her husband's unfaithfulness, she receives further bad news. Her mother has died: Joanna, now Queen of Castile, must return to her kingdom. Her tantrums over her husband's infidelities have brought her the nickname Joanna the Mad.

At the Castilian court in Burgos, the Queen is welcomed by her subjects, but her marital life is still in turmoil. Philip becomes bewitched by Aixa, a Moorish prostitute who uses her sexual attraction and black magic to secure Philip's favour. The King becomes noticeably indifferent toward his wife, which adds to her increasingly insane jealousy.

Two political parties form at court, one Flemish, the other Castilian. The conspiring Flemish usurpers are headed by Señor de Veyre, Philip's right-hand man. Their objective is to have Joanna declared insane so Philip can seize her power. Joanna's supporters, the loyal Castilian royalists, are headed by the Admiral of Castile. He and the Queen's confidant, Elvira, try to rescue Juana from her marital obsessions.

However the Queen is fixated on retaining her husband's love. To avoid any temptations at court, she hires only ugly maids of honour, but Philip has brought Aixa to court under the name Beatriz de Bobadilla. Unaware of this, the Queen asks Beatriz for a spell to help her retain her husband's love. Equally misguided is Joanna's attempt to regain Philip's attention by simulating a love affair with Captain Álvaro de Estúñiga, a close friend from childhood. The Queen's lack of control permits her enemies to have her declared incompetent to rule. The King, encouraged by Señor de Veyre, resolves to take the kingdom for himself and remove Joanna from power. He finds an unlikely ally in Joanna's own father, king Ferdinand, who has remarried and has no further interest in either his daughter's fate or the kingdom of Castile.

While her fate is decided at a court assembly, Joanna makes her case successfully, counting on her subjects' unquestionable support. However, her powerful speech coincides with Philip falling gravely ill. Although she cares devotedly for her husband, the doctors cannot save him. On his deathbed, Philip apologises to his wife. After his death Joanna, heavily pregnant, begins a long journey southward to bury her husband. She does not go far. Forced to stop to give birth to a daughter, Joanna never reaches her destination. Her mental health plummets further, and she is deemed incapable of rule. Although Joanna retains her title, at the age of 28 she is locked as a madwoman in the castle of Tordesillas for the rest of her long life.

Philip was buried in a nearby monastery, which Joanna was allowed to visit occasionally.

== Cast ==
- Pilar López de Ayala as Joanna of Castile
- Daniele Liotti as Philip I of Castile
- Rosana Pastor as Elvira
- Manuela Arcuri as Aixa/Beatriz
- Eloy Azorín as Álvaro de Estúñiga
- Giuliano Gemma as Señor de Veyre
- Roberto Álvarez as Admiral of Castile
- Guillermo Toledo as Capitán Corrales
- Susi Sánchez as Isabella I of Castile
- Chema de Miguel as Juan Manuel, señor de Belmonte
- Andrés Lima as Diego López de Pacheco, marqués de Villena
- Cipriano Lodosa as Marliano

== Production ==
The film is a Enrique Cerezo PC, Pedro Costa PC, Production Group, Sogepaq and Take 2000 production.

Principal photography began on October 16, 2000 and ended on January 5, 2001.

The film is not an accurate portrayal of historical events, taking many liberties with the facts. Some character and plot devices are completely fictional, most notably the Moorish lover of Phillip. Some scenes were loosely based on the stage play The Madness of Love (Teatro del Príncipe, Madrid, 12 January 1855) by the dramatist Manuel Tamayo y Baus (1829–1898) that inspired several films with the same subject.

The film was shot in historical castles and places in Sigüenza, Talamanca de Jarama, the Monastery of Las Huelgas in Burgos, and Guimarães in Portugal, among other carefully chosen spots. The music for the film was composed by José Nieto, who took inspiration from the Burgos school of organists, such as Antonio de Cabezón, and La Folia Española, Luis de Milán, important 16th-century composer. The film ran into several problems even before it was released to the public. The Italian co-producers changed certain parts of the film for the Italian premiere, and Aranda had to threaten them with lawsuits. However, the version released in Spain and the United States was the original, as Aranda conceived it. The film was the Spanish entry of that year to the Academy Awards. It was picked up by Sony Pictures for distribution in the USA retitling the film in the American market as Mad Love. The same name had already been used by the 1995 Mad Love.

== Reception ==
Jennifer Green in Screen Daily, reviewing the film for international audiences while it was still on theatrical release in Spain, noted, "Aranda takes a clear position, and one decidedly influenced by the modern day; that the future queen was passionate, in some ways ahead-of-her-times and seriously self-destructive - but not crazy." She took issue with the voiceover narration and Liotti's obvious dubbing, but commented, "Lopez de Ayala gives a visceral performance which captures the audience and has positioned her as the actress-to-watch in Spain at the moment."

Sheila Norman-Culp wrote in Midland Daily News, "With her expressive brown eyes and uncontrolled fury, Lopez de Ayala steals the spotlight", but wrote of the leading man, "it's hard to tell whether Liotti is just eye candy or successfully reflecting an unthinking, wooden lout".

Kenneth Turan gave the film a positive review in The Los Angeles Times: "'Mad Love' succeeds as a full-bodied diversion because it takes even its silly elements seriously. If you're in the mood for impressive castles and sumptuous costumes, torch-lit processions and decorative nudity, this is the place to turn." He singled out López de Ayala's performance for praise and noted how contemporary Aranda made the queen: "Juana is simply a quintessential modern woman born centuries before her time. She embraces her sexuality, is not ashamed to breast-feed her children though the court frowns on it, and demands commitment from her spouse. If she gets, shall we say, a teensy bit overwrought about her man's compulsive straying, who's to blame her?"

By contrast, Nathan Rabin in The A.V. Club was unimpressed: "A big ripe hunk of Spanish cheese, the handsomely mounted but largely vacant bodice-ripper Mad Love suggests that revisionist feminist history, softcore pornography, and Harlequin-style romance need not be mutually exclusive." He thought Liotti's performance a weak link and concluded, "The film bears all the signifiers of art—elaborate costumes and sets, a subject of historical importance, a voice-of-authority narrator unleashing a torrent of names and dates—but at heart it's a randy, oversexed soap opera in period garb."

Mad Love has an approval rating of 48% on review aggregator website Rotten Tomatoes, based on 50 reviews, and an average rating of 5.3/10. The website's critical consensus states: "An overwrought bodice-ripper, Mad Love is more silly than dramatic". Metacritic assigned the film a weighted average score of 55 out of 100, based on 19 critics, indicating "mixed or average reviews".

== Awards ==
López de Ayala won the best actress award at the San Sebastián International Film Festival.

== DVD release ==
The film was released on DVD in the U.S. on January 21, 2003, in Spanish with English subtitles.

== See also ==
- List of Spanish films of 2001
- List of submissions to the 74th Academy Awards for Best Foreign Language Film
- List of Spanish submissions for the Academy Award for Best Foreign Language Film
