= Myrna Vázquez =

Puerto Rican screen, stage, radio and television actress

- Born: Myrna Leticia Vázquez Díaz; February 4, 1935; Cidra, Puerto Rico
- Died: February 17, 1975 (aged 40); Boston, Massachusetts, U.S.
- Resting place: Santa María Magdalena de Pazzis Cemetery
- Occupations: Actress, Activist

Myrna Vázquez (1935-1975) was a Puerto Rican screen, stage, radio, and television actress. She later became an influential community activist in Boston's South End.

== Early life and career ==
She was born in Cidra, Puerto Rico, in 1935, one of seven siblings. Sometime around 1945 the family moved to Santurce, San Juan, Puerto Rico. As a child she showed a penchant for the performing arts, using a box for a platform and giving recitals for family and friends.

While still a teenager, she belonged to the comedy troupe of Ramón Rivero (known as "Diplo"). Through her work there, she became friends with the composers Sylvia Rexach and Amaury Veray. She graduated from Central High School in Santurce. Went on to study Theater at the University of Puerto Rico, where she was active in the university theater, and went on to appear in many professional productions. At nineteen, she played Juanita in the world premiere of "La Carreta" by René Marqués. She also appeared in "Mariana or el Alba" and "Los Soles Truncos" by Marqués; "Doce Paredes Negras" by Juan González-Bonilla; and "Tiempo Muerto" by Manuel Méndez Ballester. In 1969 she starred in the premiere of "La Pasión según Antigona Pérez" by Luis Rafael Sánchez, who wrote the part specifically for her.

In the 1960s, she co-founded the Teatro El Cemí with actors Marcos Betancourt, Jacobo Morales, and Elín Ortiz. She founded the Cooperative Theater Arts (COOPARTE) in the early 1970s, and rescued a theater in Villa Palmeras for use by the organization. The Teatro COOPARTE offered theater arts classes to young people, and organized and hosted the first Festival of Latin American Theater. Vázquez served as its president for over four years. She also worked for some time as a drama teacher for the youth of the San José community in Río Piedras.

Vázquez suffered from a congenital heart condition, aortic stenosis, and had a series of surgeries starting in her twenties. Despite the medical danger, she had three sons with her husband, the actor Félix Monclova. One of her sons, René Monclova, became an actor; he was named for his godfather, René Marqués. Eugenio Monclova became a drama teacher and Hector Ivan Monclova a writer.

== Activism ==
In 1974 her marriage ended. Vázquez moved to Boston in search of employment, leaving two of her sons with her mother and taking the third with her to Boston. According to her son, the move was necessary because Vázquez and Monclova had been blackballed for their support of Puerto Rican independence. While living in Boston's South End, she married Hector Colon Declet. She also joined a group of Latina community activists who, among other things, founded a women's shelter. The original shelter was a brownstone in the South End named for another of the founders, Mary Lawson Foreman.

Though Vázquez did not live in Boston for long, she had a lasting influence on the South End community. She was a charismatic activist who helped found the Villa Victoria Center for the Arts, the art component of Inquilinos Boricuas en Acción (IBA Boston), and the annual Puerto Rican Festival.

Vázquez died of a heart condition in 1975. Soon afterwards, the group of activists with whom she had worked decided to name their organization in her honor. Today, Casa Myrna includes several other shelters in the South End and Dorchester neighborhoods, and operates a Transitional Housing Program, a Teen Parenting Program, a housing program for young parents and their children, and SafeLink, the state's first domestic violence hotline.

She is remembered on the Boston Women's Heritage Trail. Her hometown of Cidra celebrates Myrna Vázquez Week each February. A play written in her honor, Myrna Vázquez: Reconocete by Laura Figueroa and Fátima Seda-Barletta, was presented at the Cultural Center of Cidra in 1979. Another theatrical tribute, Son Corazón / Heartstrung by Rosa Luisa Márquez, premiered at the Jorge Hernández Cultural Center in Villa Victoria, Boston, in July 1995. Artist Antonio Martorell, who had known Vázquez, built some elaborate props for the play, including a marionette.

== See also ==
· · ·
