= Tras Talleres (Santurce) =

Subbarrio of Santurce in San Juan, Puerto Rico

Coordinates: 18°26′47″N 66°04′48″W

- Subbarrio
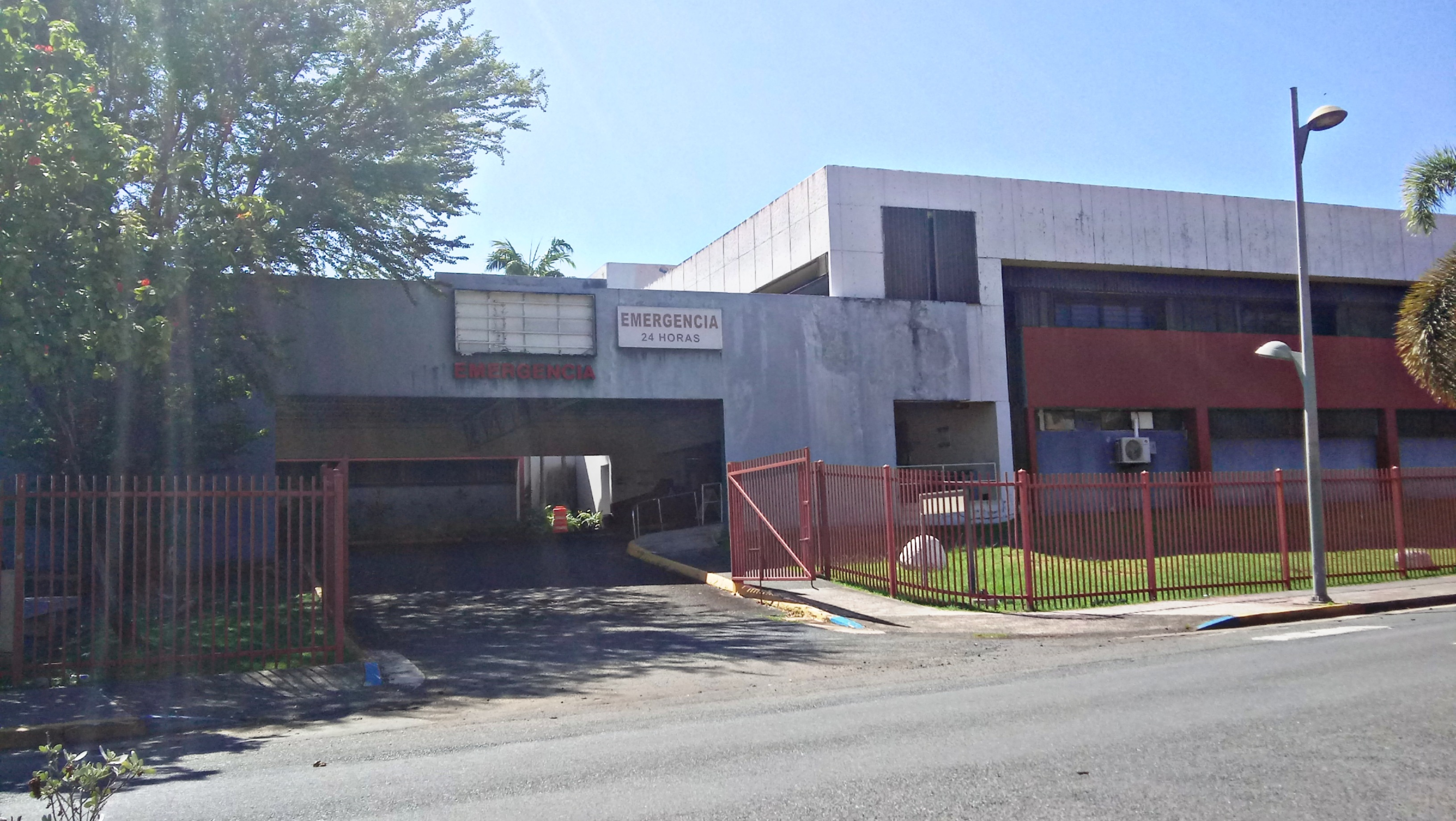
- Hospital in Tras Talleres

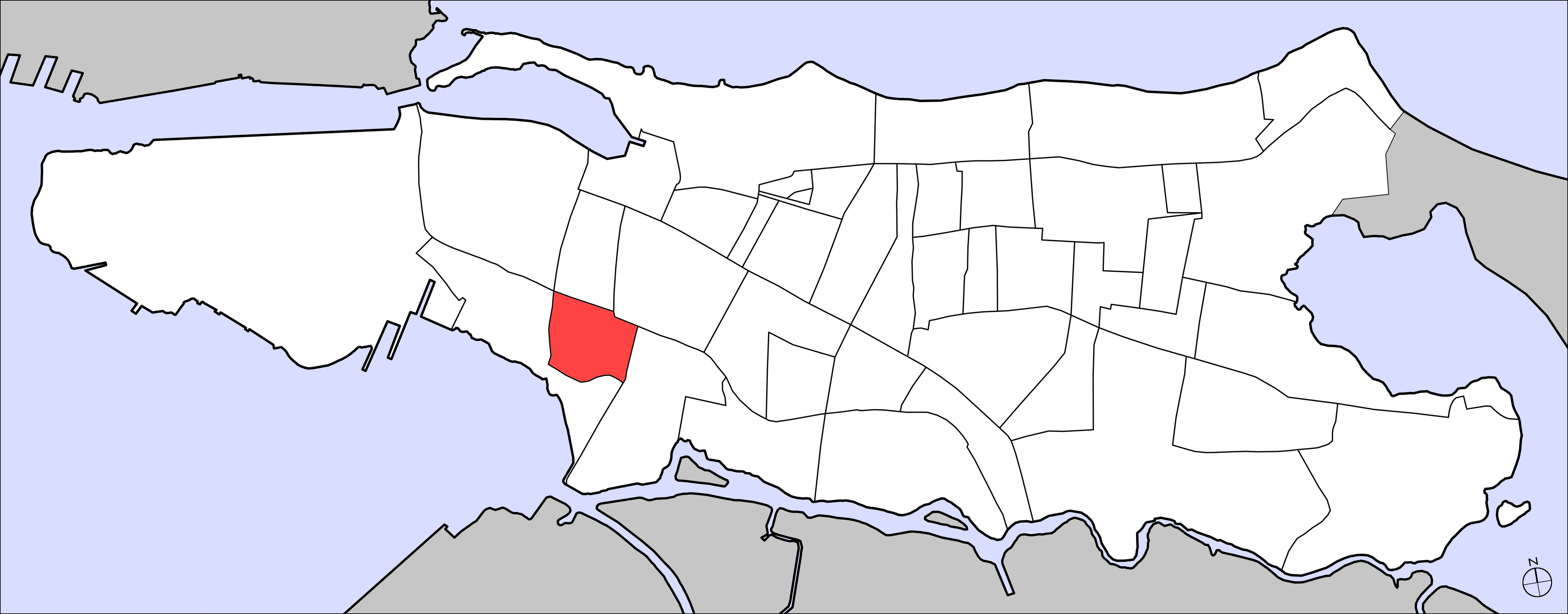
- A map showing the location of Tras Talleres in Santurce
- Commonwealth: Puerto Rico
- Municipality: San Juan
- Barrio: Santurce

Area
  - Total: .06 sq mi (0.16 km^{2})
  - Land: .06 sq mi (0.16 km^{2})
- Elevation: 23 ft (7.0 m)

Population (2010)
  - Total: 1,789
  - Density: 29,816.7/sq mi (11,512.3/km^{2})
- Source: 2010 Census
- Time zone: UTC−4 (AST)

Tras Talleres is one of the forty subbarrios of Santurce, San Juan, Puerto Rico. It comprises the area demarcated by the Luis Muñoz Rivera Expressway on the south, Calle Cerra on the west, Avenida Las Palmas on the north, and Avenida Roberto H. Todd on the east.

== Name ==
The origin of the name, which literally translates to "Rear Workshops" in Spanish, is derived from the mechanic's shops built to service the railway which existed in Puerto Rico in the 19th century, in the site which is currently occupied by Bahia Condominiums A & B.

== Demographics ==
In 1940, Tras Talleres had a population of 7,750.

In 2000, Tras Talleres had a population of 2,453.

In 2010, Tras Talleres had a population of 1,789 and a population density of 29,816.7 persons per square mile.

== Art ==
Santurce es Ley celebrates the ability of artists to create urban art in and around Santurce without being arrested or fined. Tras Talleres has become an open-air art gallery with new art being created around the city all the time.

== Notable people ==
- Victoria Espinosa - theatre director, academic and women's rights activist
- Andy Montañez - singer and songwriter

== Gallery ==
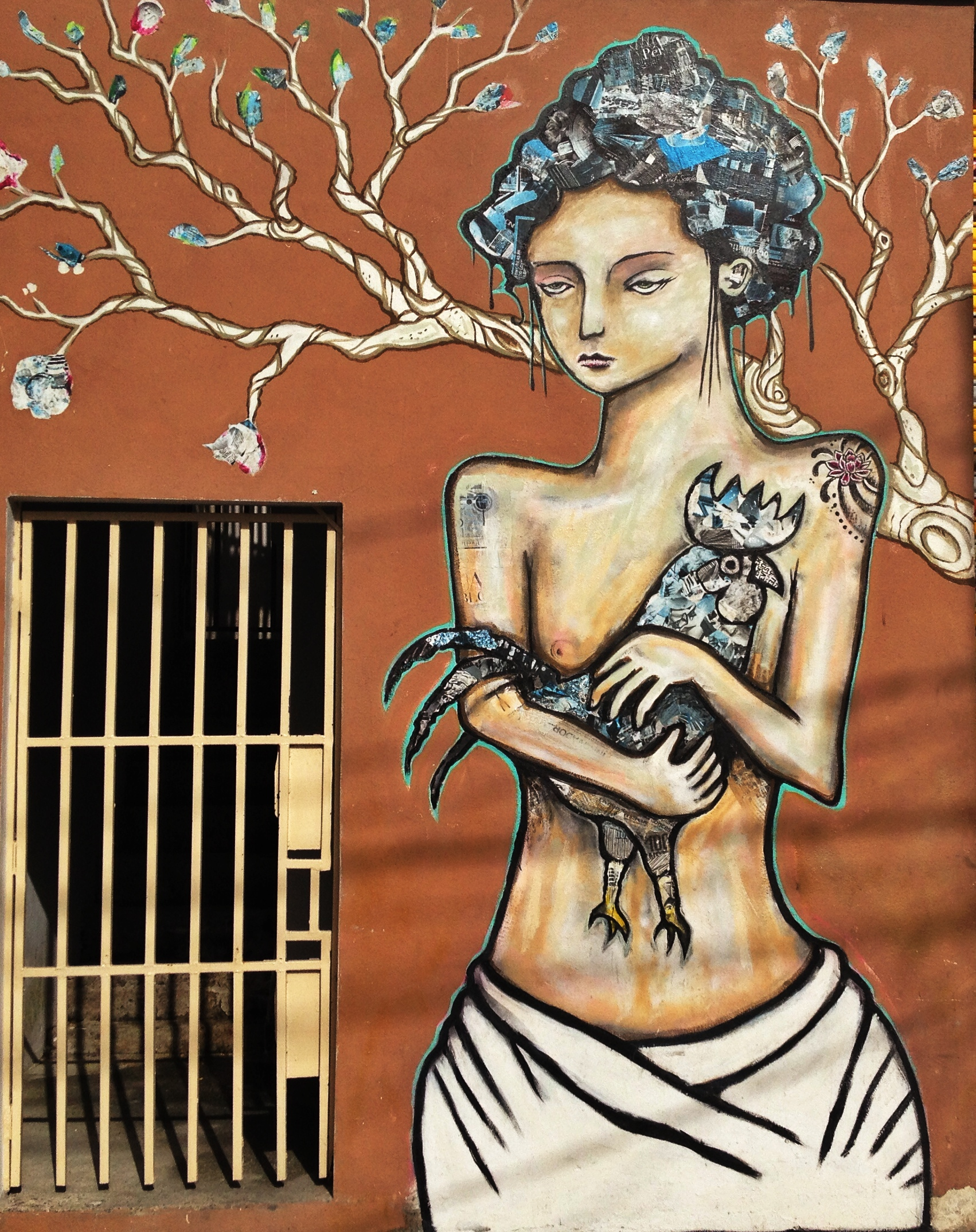
"A Street Art Tour of Santurce" on Calle Cerra

== See also ==
- List of communities in Puerto Rico
