= Enrique Maluenda =

Chilean show host and politician (1935–2023)

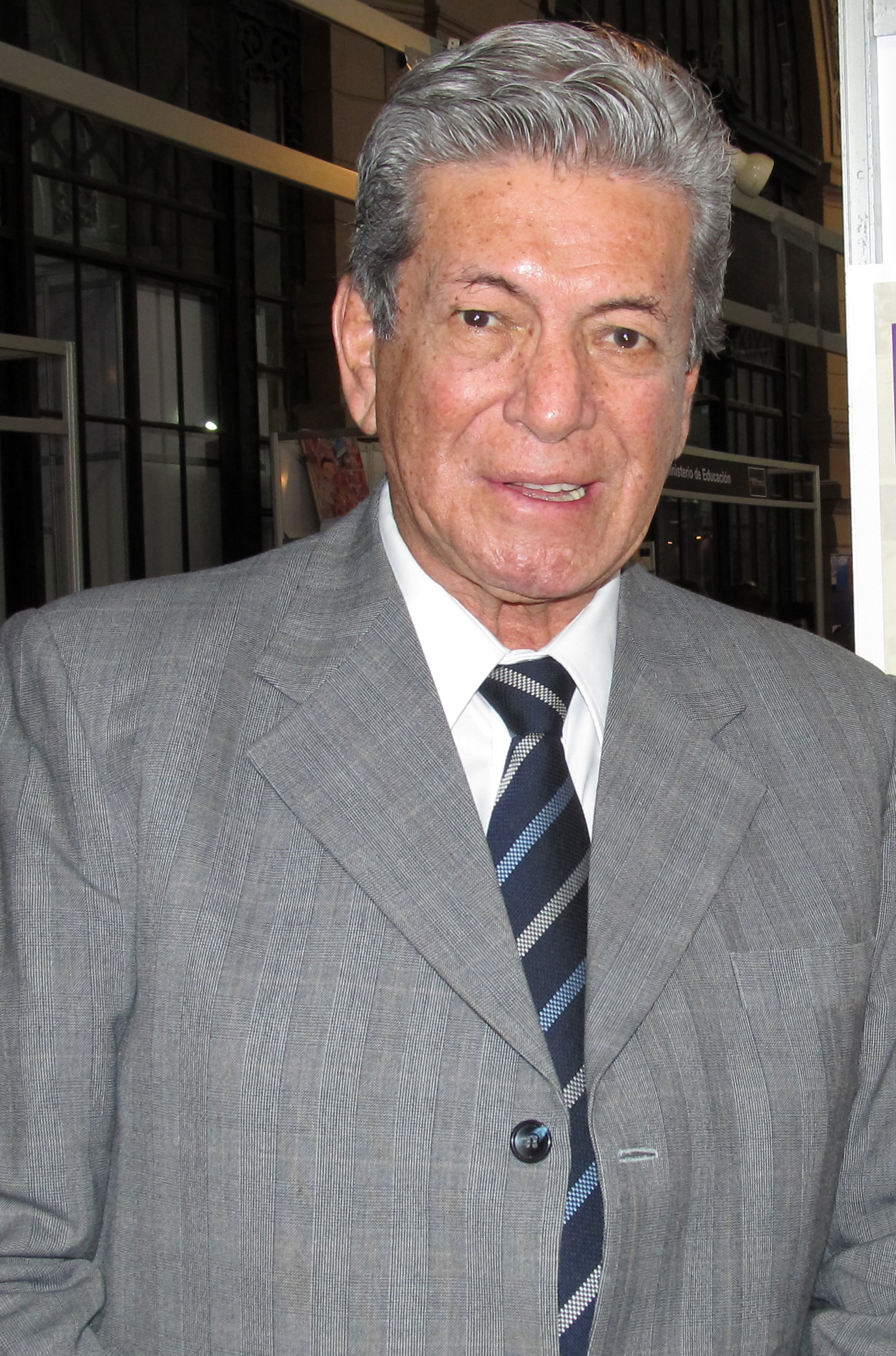
- Maluenda in 2011
- Born: Héctor Enrique Maluenda Meneses; 5 August 1935; Santiago, Chile
- Died: 22 October 2023 (aged 88)
- Occupations: Show host, politician, fireman
- Years active: 1962–2023

Héctor Enrique Maluenda Meneses (5 August 1935 – 22 October 2023), better known as Enrique Maluenda, was a Chilean television show host, politician and fireman. Maluenda forged a career that saw him get work not only in Chile, but in other Latin American countries as well.

== Early life ==
Maluenda was born in Santiago, Chile on 5 August 1935, as the son of Enrique Maluenda Astudillo and of Hilda Meneses. He graduated from the Liceo Manuel Barros Bordoño School in Santiago.

== Career ==
Maluenda first became a host for Radio Prat in Talca. His first stint on television was a brief one in 1962 as the host of a program called De Fiesta Con Los Flamingos (Partying with Los Flamingos), which featured Los Flamingos, a popular music group of the era. Its members included Mandolino. and frequently shared scenes with the host.

The next year, in 1963, he immigrated to Peru, where he remained until 1968. In 1964, Maluenda was hired on Peruvian television to host a show that was named El Hit de la 1 (The 1 O'Clock Hit), which became a success. According to a 2014 interview, he said that he owed his career to Peru.

In 1968, Maluenda traveled to Puerto Rico, where he was quickly signed by Canal 11 to host a television show. Although successful in Puerto Rico, Maluenda returned to Chile in 1970. He was engaged by Canal 9 to host Sábados en el 9 (Saturdays on channel 9), a competitor to Sábados Gigantes hosted by Don Francisco.

The most successful part of Maluenda's career began in 1972, when he returned to of Puerto Rico. He returned to local television there on Canal 11's Súper Show Goya sponsored by Goya Foods. His co-hosts were Luz Odilia Font and Luis Daniel Rivera. The show was also broadcast to Spanish-speaking viewers in the United States. His engagement on the show ended in 1976.

Afterwards, he returned to Chile, having by now gained considerable experience in the television show-hosting profession and become a house-hold name in various Latin American countries. He found work on a show called Dingolondango, which broadcast theater plays live. One of the plays presented during his participation in this show was a version of Jesus Christ Superstar, which local producers renamed Jesus Christ Superstar Andino. Another show that Maluenda hosted during that era was the successful Festival de la 1 (1 O'Clock Festival), which was shown live on Television Nacional de Chile channel from 1979 to 1988. Dingolondango was also shown on the TNC television network.

After Festival de la 1 was canceled, Maluenda worked in radio as a host on Radio Nacional. He, nevertheless, wanted to return to television. In 1992, Maluenda went back to Peru, where he hosted El Baúl de la Felicidad (The Storehouse of Happiness), a Panamericana Television show.

Near the end of his television career, Maluenda returned to Chile permanently during the mid-1990s. He participated on a show sponsored by the Concepción lottery, named Teve Kino when it was broadcast on La Red channel from 1996 to 1998. It was later renamed Fiesta de Millones (Party of Millions) and moved to Megavisión from 1998 to 2000. After its cancellation, Maluenda retired. He did, however, continue to appear on television interviews. He also had a cameo as a TV show host in the 2008 film, Tony Manero.

== Political career ==
Maluenda supported Augusto Pinochet's campaign to remain president during the 1988 plebiscite.

In 2012, Maluenda joined the Union Demócrata Independiente, a Chilean rightist political party.

== Personal life ==
Maluenda's first marriage occurred at the age of 19. The couple had two children; his wife later died.

In 1962, Maluenda met Mercedes Ramírez Quiroz. She came from a family of firemen, which included her brothers. Maluenda became a volunteer fireman himself. In 2012, he commemorated fifty years as a fireman. At the time, he was still a member of the unit Segunda Compañía de Bomba Lo Espejo.

Maluenda and Ramírez Quiroz married in 1973 and had three children.

=== Health problems and death ===
In his later years, Maluenda's health declined. He had facial paralysis in 2004, a liver transplant in 2006, and a pacemaker inserted in 2010. He died on 22 October 2023, at the age of 88.
