= Mandolino (comedian) =

Chilean singer and comedian (1934–2014)

Armando Navarrete Navarrete (February 28, 1934 – May 14, 2014), better known as Mandolino, was a Chilean actor, singer and comedian. He was known in the United States, Chile, and in the rest of Latin America for his comedy sketches with Don Francisco on Sabado Gigante (Sabados Gigantes in Chile). Navarrete began his show business career as a singer in the Chilean musical group Los Flamingos.

== Early life ==
Navarrete was born in Concepcion, Chile.

== Entertainment career ==
Navarrete first started out as a singer, joining Los Flamingos when the group was formed in 1955. Los Flamingos were one of the first rock music bands in Chile; they moved to Argentina in 1959 to expand their fame, and returned to Chile in 1962 to host a television show named De Fiesta Con Los Flamingos, (Partying With Los Flamingos) co-hosted also by Enrique Maluenda.

Around 1969 or 1970, Navarrete met Mario Kreutzberger, better known as "Don Francisco", who had already established Sabados Gigantes in Chile. He spoke to Kreutzberger about creating Mandolino, a wise-cracking, untrusting character who would serve as a foil to Don Francisco. At first, Kreutzberger was reluctant to include Mandolino in the show regularly, but he relented. This resulted in Mandolino becoming a regular on the show for years, including after its move to the United States for Univisión.

Navarrete's Mandolino character was inspired by Martin and Lewis. He consulted Cantinflas for advice, who suggested to him that Mandolino wear loose pants on his sketches.

The Mandolino became popular in Chile and in the rest of Latin America. When, on April 12, 1986, Sabado Gigante began to be broadcast in the United States live from Miami on Univisión, Navarrete moved there. He remained on the show until 1991, when he was fired as a result of a fight between him and Kreutzberger. For a period afterwards, he sold newspapers in the United States to sustain himself. Navarrete found work for a brief time on Telemundo.

== Later life ==
In 2011, Navarrete moved to Honduras along with his daughter Lidia. Navarrete began hosting a show there on Television Educativa Nacional called La Hora de Mandolino.

== Death ==
On May 14, 2014, Navarro died in Tegucigalpa from a heart attack in his sleep.
