= Victoria Espinosa =

Puerto Rican director and academic (1922–2019)

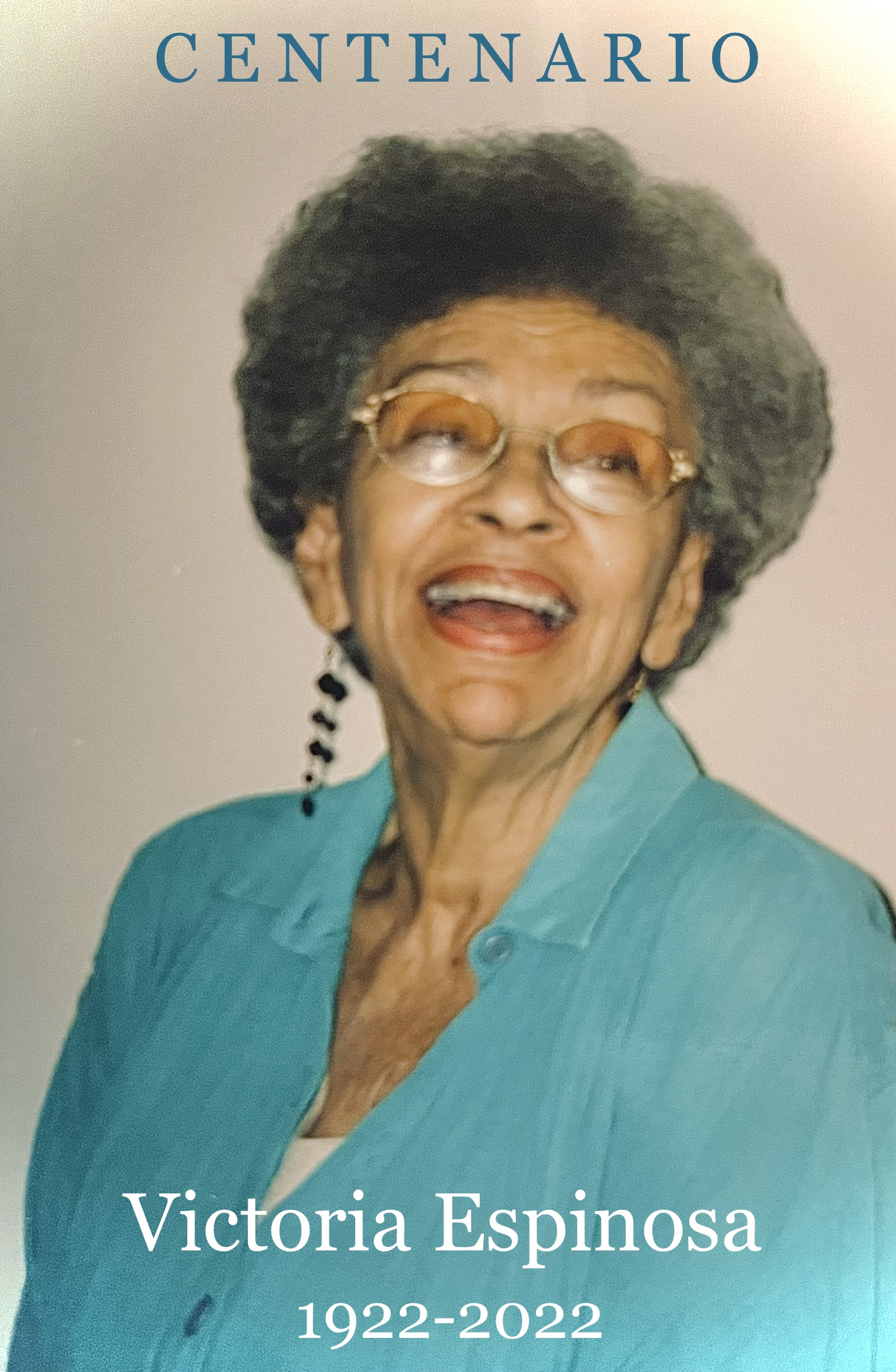
- Born: March 26, 1922; Santurce, Puerto Rico
- Died: July 6, 2019 (aged 97); Bayamón, Puerto Rico
- Resting place: Santa María Magdalena de Pazzis Cemetery
- Occupations: Theatre director Academic
- Known for: 'Grand dame' of Puerto Rican theatre
- Spouse: Luis Maisonet
- Awards: Lifetime Achievement Award - XII International Theatre Festival (1997); Pozo de Plata - Federico García Lorca Casa Natal Museum (2000)

Academic background
- Education: University of Puerto Rico; National Autonomous University of Mexico

Academic work
- Institutions: University of Puerto Rico

Victoria Espinosa (March 26, 1922 – July 6, 2019) was a Puerto Rican theatre director and academic, who was Professor of Theatre at the University of Puerto Rico. Compared to other Puerto Rican theatre pioneers, such as Myrna Casas and Gilda Navarra, Espinosa directed over 120 plays during the course of her career, founded Puerto Rico Theatrón Theater Workshop and the Puerto Rico Actors' Association, and became known as "the 'grand dame' of Puerto Rican theatre".

== Early life and education ==
Born on March 26, 1922, in the Trastalleres neighbourhood of San Juan, her father, Eduviges Espinosa, was a bricklayer and poet, and her mother, Isolina Torres, was a housewife. Biracial (her father was black, her mother white), Espinosa experienced racial discrimination as a child.

Espinosa attended the University of Puerto Rico (UPR) for her undergraduate degree in Drama, graduating in 1949, having been taught by Leopoldo Santiago Lavandero, and Ludwig Schajowicz. She was later awarded an MA in Hispanic Studies. She then completed her doctorate in Practical Drama at the National Autonomous University of Mexico (UNAM), which was awarded in 1968.

== Career ==
At her retirement in 2010, Espinosa held the position of Professor Emeritus of Theatre at the University of Puerto Rico. She started her career at the university, directing the children's theatre. This programme trained a number of performers including: Luis Rafael Sánchez, Pedro Santaliz, and Rafael Acevedo. Whilst working there she founded Puerto Rico Theatrón Theater Workshop. One of its notable productions in the 1970s, Areyto Pessoro, depicted the life of Taino people, who were indigenous to Puerto Rico. From 1984 to 1988 she managed the Institute of Puerto Rican Culture. She also founded the Puerto Rico Actors' Association. Other Puerto Rican directors Espinosa has been compared to are Myrna Casas and Gilda Navarra. Espinosa also acted at two points in her career: during her doctoral studies in Mexico, and when she was in her 90s. During the latter period she took roles in Moliere's Las Preciosa Ridiculas and Samuel Beckett's Rockaby.

== Theatre direction ==
Espinosa directed over 120 plays during the course of her career. In 1958 she directed Los soles truncos (The Half-Suns), written by René Marques at the First Puerto Rican Theatre Festival. This collaboration was a success and Espinosa was the only person to direct that play for the following thirty years. She also staged the plays of her former student, Luis Rafael Sánchez, collaborating with him often.

In 1978 she directed the world premiere of The Public, a play by Federico García Lorca. The play was written in 1930, but could not be performed at the time due to its homosexual themes. Her staging included surrealistic paintings. Another notable production by Espinosa was that of La Isla Antilla by Tere Marichal, which went on tour to North America in 1996. Espinosa is also recognised as "singlehandedly" establishing experimental theatre in Puerto Rico. She also directed El archivo, a play by Tadeus Rosewicz, which was performed by the Theatre Company of the Student Council, which established them as a more serious company.

== Awards and recognition ==
The Who's Who of Contemporary World Theatre referred to Espinosa as "the 'grand dame' of Puerto Rican theatre" and in 1997 she was awarded the Lifetime Achievement Award from the XII International Theatre Festival, which was held in Miami.

The Federico García Lorca Casa Natal Museum awarded Espinosa their highest accolade, the Pozo de Plata, in 2000. In the same year the Music Hall Theater in Santurce was renamed Teatro Victoria Espinosa in her honour.

Espinosa and her husband featured in the documentary series Crónicas 90, which highlighted the achievements of Puerto Ricans who had reached the age of 90. Other people featured in the series included: Frank H. Wadsworth, José R. Alicea, Iluminado Dávila, Nellie Vera Sánchez and Flavia Lugo de Marichal.

In 2022 the centenary of her birth was celebrated with lectures and performances at University of Puerto Rico. These events were also part of Week for the Eradication of Racism and the Affirmation of African Descent, which in turn took place within UN International Decade for People of African Descent (2012-2024), and linked to Espinosa's biracial heritage.

In 2024 the Puerto Rican festival La Campechada was dedicated to Espinosa, and featured performances across Santurce inspired by guiding themes of her life, such as gender and theatre.

== Personal life ==
In 1953 Espinosa married surrealist artist Luis Maisonet; they had two children. She died on July 6, 2019, aged 97. She was buried at the Santa María Magdalena de Pazzis Cemetery.
