= Luz Odilia Font =

Puerto Rican actress (1929–2022)

- Born: Luz Odilia Arocho; November 11, 1929; San Sebastián, Puerto Rico
- Died: February 9, 2022 (aged 92); Guaynabo, Puerto Rico
- Occupation: Actress
- Years active: 1950s–2022

Luz Odilia Font (née Arocho; November 11, 1929 – February 9, 2022) was a Puerto Rican actress. She was perhaps better remembered for her role as "Clara" in the 2013 Puerto Rican film production, "The Condemned".

== Life and career ==
Born in San Sebastián, the daughter of a social worker mother, Font enjoyed music since an early age. At age nine, Font began a formal training in music by taking musical classes. Her family later moved to the San Juan area of Santurce, where they were neighbors with Manuel Mendez Ballester, a very well known playwright of the era. Ballester discovered her and he invited her to a radio show he produced at the time, named "La Escuela del Aire" ("School on Air").

Font eventually graduated from the University of Puerto Rico with an associate degree, hoping to follow that with a degree in psychology. Before that could happen, she met her future husband, Luis Alberto Font. When the couple married, Font took her husband's last name, a practice that is still very uncommon, as of 2024, in Puerto Rico and the rest of Latin America.

Font moved to the United States but her stay in her new country did not last long. She was pregnant while visiting Puerto Rico. After giving birth, Font decided to stay in her home country and give acting as a career a try. Soon afterwards, she got her first television acting job, when Telemundo Puerto Rico, then better known mostly as "Canal 2", hired her for a bi-monthly show named "Drama Antizime" (named, for promotional reasons, after a local mouthwash brand, the show was later named, for promotional reasons also, "Drama Malta India" after a local, non-alcoholic malt).

Font made her telenovela debut in a 1958 drama show named "Retorno al Pasado". By 1961, Font's services as an actress were so requested that she had a unique contract which allowed her to work for both of Puerto Rico's main television stations, Telemundo Puerto Rico and WAPA-TV, at the same time. While at Telemundo Puerto Rico she acted in "Pueblo" (a telenovela not to be confused with the local supermarket chain of the same name); she also starred at WAPA-TV's "Bendita eres Tu" ("You are Blessed"). Later she starred in other telenovelas such as "Justicia" ("Justice"), "El Perdon de los Pecados" ("Sin's Forgiveness"), "Maria Merce La Mulata" ("Maria Merce the Mulatto") and the major Puerto Rican hit, "Entre Monte y Cielo" (which loosely translates to "Between Heaven and Earth").

Her theater acting career took off about the same time as "Entre Monte y Cielo" was on the air. She acted in plays by Myrna Casas and in Rene Marquez's "La Carreta", among others. During the 1960s, Font acted in the film named "El Jibarito" about the famous Puerto Rican singer and composer Rafael Hernandez, playing his sister, Victoria Hernandez.

Font's career as a television actress and personality continued and she participated in 1969's "Juan de Dios" ("John of God") as well as the international hit telenovela, 1972's "Tomiko" and in "Mujeres sin Hombres" ("Women Without Men"). She also participated in some shows that were hosted by Chilean Enrique Maluenda and participated, as show host, alongside Maluenda and her fellow Puerto Rican actor, Luis Daniel Rivera, in a variety show named "Super Show Goya", which was sponsored by Goya Foods.

In 1979, Font acted alongside Johanna Rosaly in "Vida". In 1988, she participated in "Andrea", which was another major hit among Puerto Rican telenovelas. She followed that with her acting in 1992's "Natalia". Meanwhile, she was in two Vicente Castro made-for-TV films, 1999's "Coralito Tiene dos Maridos" ("Coralito has two Husbands") and 2003's "Promesa de Reyes" ("Three Wise Men's Promises").

During 2013, the Puerto Rican Institute of Culture dedicated its 49th film festival to Font. That same year, she participated in the Puerto Rican film "The Condemned", where she acted alongside Axel Anderson, among others.

Font died in Guaynabo, Puerto Rico on February 9, 2022, at the age of 92.

== See also ==
- List of Puerto Ricans
