= Juan Manuel, lord of Belmonte =

Castilian nobleman

Juan Manuel de Villena y de la Vega

Ambassador of Spain to England
- Incumbent
- Assumed office 1499

Contador mayor of Castile

Reeve of Burgos, Segovia, Plasencia, Jaén, and Atienza

Ambassador to Pope Leo X

Councillor of State
- Incumbent
- Assumed office 1523

Personal details
- Died: 1543
- Spouse: Catalina de Rojas
- Children: Lorenzo Manuel de Villena y Rojas, Juan, Pedro, Lorenzo, Rodrigo

Juan Manuel de Villena y de la Vega (died 1543) was a Castilian nobleman, third lord of Belmonte, member of the Order of the Golden Fleece, Contador mayor of Castile, reeve of Burgos, Segovia, Plasencia, Jaén and Atienza.

== Biography ==
He was Ambassador of Spain to England in 1499. After the death of Philip I of Castile in 1506, a conflict with Ferdinand II of Aragon forced Juan Manuel into exile in Flanders, where he was apprehended and imprisoned. He was freed by Charles V and made ambassador to Pope Leo X, and in 1523 a position as councillor of state.

He was married to Catalina de Rojas. In 1536 he restored the Gospel wing of St Paul's abbey in Peñafiel, on the condition that one of the chapels of the abbey church would serve as his family tomb. His own tomb is there, as well as that of his mother, Aldonza de la Vega, and that of his wife.

His firstborn and heir was Lorenzo Manuel de Villena y Rojas, commander of the Order of Alcántara and senior butler to Charles V. His younger sons were Juan, bishop of Sigüenza (r. 1574–1579), Pedro, Lorenzo and Rodrigo.

Juan Manuel appears as a character in a number of Spanish historical films, including Juana la Loca (2001), played by Chema de Miguel, Isabel (2014), played by Jacobo Dicenta, and La corona partida (2016), again played by Jacobo Dicenta.
