= Luis Rafael Sánchez =

Puerto Rican playwright, novelist (born 1936)

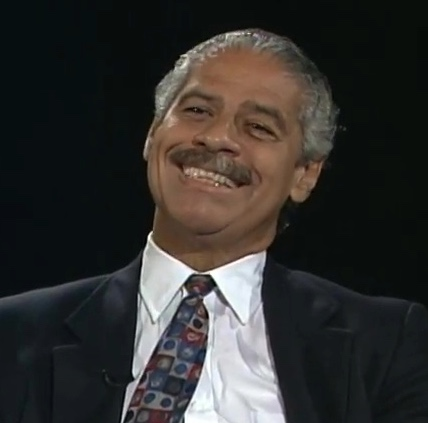
- Sanchez on CUNY TV's Charlando con Cervantes, 1995
- Born: November 17, 1936 (age 89); Humacao, Puerto Rico
- Occupations: Playwright, novelist
- Writing career
- Pen name: Wico
- Genres: novel, short story, play

Luis Rafael Sánchez, also known as "Wico" Sánchez (born November 17, 1936) is a Puerto Rican essayist, novelist, and short-story author who is widely considered one of the island's most outstanding contemporary playwrights. Possibly his best known play is La Pasión según Antígona Pérez (The Passion according to Antigona Perez), a tragedy based on the life of Olga Viscal Garriga.

== Early years ==
Luis Rafael Sánchez was born and raised by his parents in the city of Humacao, Puerto Rico, in the eastern part of Puerto Rico. There he received his primary education. His family moved to San Juan, where Sánchez continued to receive his secondary and higher education. He enrolled in the University of Puerto Rico in 1955 after graduating from high school, earning a Bachelor of Arts degree. It was during his days as a student at the university that he became interested in acting. There he was taught by Victoria Espinosa.

Sánchez's interest in literature led him to enroll at the City University of New York where in 1959 he earned his master's degree in dramatic arts. He eventually went to Madrid, Spain and earned his Doctorate in literature in 1976 from the Complutense University of Madrid.

== La Pasión según Antigona Pérez ==
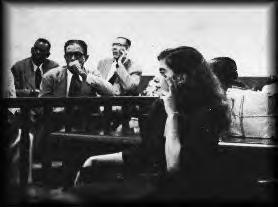
Olga Viscal Garriga on trial for refusing to recognize U.S. authority over Puerto Rico

Sánchez's best known play is La Pasión según Antigona Pérez (The Passion of Antigona Perez), a tragedy set in present-day Latin America, suggested by Sophocles' Antigone. The character of Antigona was based on the life of Olga Viscal Garriga (1926–1995). Her life was rooted in politics and her three children. She was a member of the Puerto Rican Nationalist Party and an accomplished speaker who spent time in jail for her political beliefs. Yet, she saw herself as a simple woman with simple needs. But, in fact, she was a very complex woman with many facets of her personality. The world premiere production took place in 1968 at Old San Juan's Tapia Theater, starring Myrna Vázquez as "Antigona", during the 11th Annual Puerto Rican Theater Festival.

A highly acclaimed all-star revival opened in 1991 at San Juan's Performing Arts Center featuring Alba Nydia Diaz as Antigona, Walter Rodriguez as Creon, Samuel Molina as Monsignor Escudero, Marian Pabon as Pilar Vargas, Noelia Crespo as Aurora, and Julia Thompson as Irene. The production, which integrated video and broadcast technology, was directed by Idalia Perez Garay for Teatro del Sesenta Theater Company. It featured original music by Pedro Rivera Toledo, sets by Checo Cuevas, and film sequences supervised by Puerto Rican filmmaker Luis Molina Casanova. A new production opened at San Juan's Performing Arts Center on April 8, 2011, featuring Yamaris Latorre as Antigona, directed by Gilberto Valenzuela for Tablado Puertorriqueño Theater Company.

== La Guaracha del Macho Camacho (Macho Camacho's Beat) ==
La Guaracha del Macho Camacho (Macho Camacho's Beat) was published in 1976. This novel moves to a guaracha, a Latin rhythm, inviting readers to imagine (or learn) what this beat sounds like. It has been suggested that the song itself is the real protagonist of the tale. The Americanization of Puerto Rico is explored in this work, as well as the topic of Puerto Rican politics and the political situation of the island as a colony. One aspect of this examination can be seen as a critique of Puerto Ricans who give up their culture to assimilate into the American culture as compared to Puerto Ricans who refuse to let go of their cultural identity. The book was translated into English by Gregory Rabassa.

In his essay "La guagua aérea" ("The Flying Bus"), Sánchez explores the concept of a bi-polar culture, the question of assimilation and opposition to U.S. Anglo culture. He coined the term "La guagua aérea" which has since been used by other prominent Puerto Rican authors such as Giannina Braschi who pays homage to Sánchez's classic essay in her Spanglish novel "Yo-Yo Boing!". He also wrote En cuerpo de camisa ("In Shirt Sleeves", 1966), a collection of short stories.

Luis Rafael Sánchez is now a professor emeritus at the University of Puerto Rico and the City University of New York. He travels to Europe and Latin America, where he has been involved in the teachings and works of theater.

== Other major works ==
- Los ángeles se han fatigado (play, 1960)
- Farsa del amor compradito (play, 1960)
- La hiel nuestra de cada día (play, 1960)
- Sol 13, interior (play, 1961)
- O casi el alma (play, 1965)
- En cuerpo de camisa (short story collection, 1966)
- Quíntuples (play, 1985)
- La importancia de llamarse Daniel Santos (novel, 1988)
- No llores por nosotros Puerto Rico (essay collection, 1998)
- Indiscreciones de un perro gringo (novel, 2007)
- El corazón frente al mar (essay, 2021)
- Escribir en puertorriqueño (anthology, 2024)
- Piel sospechosa (anthology, 2025)

== See also ==
- List of Puerto Rican writers
- List of Puerto Ricans
- Puerto Rican literature
- Latino Theater in the United States
