= Francisco Arriví =

Puerto Rican writer, poet and playwright (1915–2007)

- Father of the Puerto Rican Theater
- Born: June 24, 1915; Santurce, Puerto Rico
- Died: February 8, 2007 (aged 91); San Juan, Puerto Rico
- Occupations: Poet; Playwright
- Writing career
- Genres: Theatre; Poetry
- Notable work: Bolero y plena
- Literary movement: Generación de los 40

Francisco Arriví (June 24, 1915 – February 8, 2007), a.k.a. Paco, was a writer, poet and playwright known as "The Father of the Puerto Rican Theater."

== Early years ==
Arriví (birth name: Francisco Arriví Alegría) was born in Santurce, a section of the city San Juan, Puerto Rico, to a Spanish father and Puerto Rican mother. He loved to read books, a habit he acquired at the age of six. His grandmother, who used to take him to the theater every week, inspired his interest in theatrical works. He built a small stage in the backyard of his house on Calle Wilson (Wilson Street) when he was 10 years old where, together with his friends, he would make presentations of children's tales.

He received his primary education at the Padre Rufo and Rosendo Matienzo Cintrón public schools, and his secondary high school education at the Escuela Superior Central (Central High School). He became interested in writing poetry during this period of his life. After he graduated from high school, he applied for admission to University of Puerto Rico at Rio Piedras where he continued his education. He wrote one of his first musical compositions, Himno al Alma Máter, which is the official hymn of said educational institution and in 1938 earned a degree in Spanish and Latin-American literature.

== Theatrical career ==
Upon his return to Puerto Rico, and under the direction of Leopoldo Santiago Lavandero, Arriví joined the Sociedad Dramática de Teatro Popular (Drama Society of Popular Theater), who called themselves Areyto (Areyto is a Taino word which means "majestic ceremonial dance"). Arriví used his experience with Areyto in his later theatrical presentations.

Arriví earned a living as an educator at the Escuela Superior de Ponce (Ponce High School) where he founded the school's student drama club, the Tinglado Puertorriqueño. In 1940 he began his career as a playwright at the school, after staging his original play Club de Solteros (Bachelors Club).

Arriví actively collaborated with an educational program sponsored by the Department of Education called Escuela del Aire (The Airwave School) broadcast over WIPR Radio. His show, From the Jungle to the Skyscrapers, presented many radio plays and was considered the best radio show on the island. These plays included Hacienda Villareal, Alma de Leyenda (Legendary Soul), Heroes de Guerra (War Heroes) and Pajinas de Nuestra Historia (Pages of our History), all written by Arriví.

In 1949, in New York City, Arriví was granted a scholarship from the Rockefeller Foundation and earned his master's degree in Radio and Theater from Columbia University.

In 1951, Arriví had the distinction of writing Ayer y Hoy (Yesterday and Today), the first television program transmitted in Puerto Rico. During the two years that he spent behind the T.V. cameras, he wrote the script for El Niño Dios (The Child God) and Luis Muñoz Rivera.

In 1955, Arriví presented one of his greatest works Bolero y Plena at the University Theater and, in 1958, he presented Vejigantes in the First Festival of Puerto Rican Theater. These were followed by Sirena (Mermaid) and Medusa en la Bahía (Medusa in the Bay). In addition, Arriví gained international recognition and his plays were presented abroad.

In 1959, Vejigantes, a work which presents the "complexities of Puerto Rican racial identity", was presented by Frank Dauster and received an award from the Institute of Literature. That same year he was named director of the theater program of the Puerto Rican Institute of Culture. Also that same year, Arrivi and fellow Puerto Rican theater figure, Leopoldo Santiago, went to the western Puerto Rico city of Mayagüez to watch a play. During that trip, they were among the first people outside Mayagüez to discover young actor, Adrian Garcia.

In 1961 he organized the First Playwright's Seminary. In the seventh celebration of the Puerto Rican Theater Festival, Arriví presented a new version of his first play Club de Solteros (Bachelors Club), now titled Coctel de Don Nadie (Mr. Nobody's Cocktail). His other acclaimed works include: Acto de Fe (Act of Faith), Cantico Para un Recuerdo (Song of Remembrance) and Absurdos Contra la Muerte (Absurdities Against Death).

== Poet ==
In 1958, Arriví published his first book of poems titled Isla y Nada (Island and Nothing) which was awarded the first place prize of the Círculo Cultural Yaucano.

In 1960, he published another book of poems titled Frontera (Frontier) which was also awarded the first place prize of the Círculo Cultural Yaucano, in addition to a first place prize from the Puerto Rican Institute of Literature.

Arriví was also the author of many essays dealing with the theater. Amongst these were Entrada por las Raíces, (Entering by the Roots), Conciencia Puertorriqueña del Teatro Contemporáneo (Puerto Rican Conscience of the Contemporary Theater), and Areyto Mayor (High Areyto).

== Written works ==
Amongst Arriví's published works are the following:

In Spanish

- Bolero Y Plena; Editorial Cultural, ISBN 84-283-0689-3 (84-283-0689-3)
- Ceiba; Areyto; Cemi; Coqui; Boriken, ISBN 84-499-1165-6 (84-499-1165-6)
- Tres Obras De Teatro; Instituto de Cultura Puertorriquena, ISBN 0-86581-611-5 (0-86581-611-5)
- Via Poetica; Editorial Universitaria, Universidad de Puerto Rico, ISBN 0-8477-3222-3 (0-8477-3222-3)

In English

- Canticle for a Memory; Cross-Cultural Communications, ISBN 0-89304-156-4 (0-89304-156-4)
- Via Poetica; Editorial Universitaria, Universidad de Puerto Rico, ISBN 0-8477-3223-1 (0-8477-3223-1)

== Lyrics to "Himno de la Vida" ==
The following are the lyrics to Francisco Arriví's 1938 Himno de la Vida (The Anthem of Life), the anthem of the University of Puerto Rico at Río Piedras:

"Himno de la Vida" by Francisco Arriví
Spanish (original version)	English translation
¡Cantemos unidos un himno a la Alma Máter; Cantemos con fuerza el Himno de la Vida que anuncie Juventud, Amor y Libertad, dé gloria al luchador, honra de la Universidad!	Let us sing together an anthem to the Alma Mater; let us sing with strength an Anthem of Life which proclaims of Youth, Love, and Liberty, and that gives glory to he who fights, he is the honour of the University!

== Later years ==
Arriví, who was also the cousin of Dr. Ricardo Alegría known as the "Father of Modern Puerto Rican Archaeology", played an instrumental role in the establishment of the Centro de Bellas Artes Luis A. Ferré (Luis A. Ferré Performing Arts Center) in Puerto Rico.

On February 8, 2007, Arriví died of cardiac arrest at the Ashford Presbyterian Community Hospital. A vigil was held at the Teatro Francisco Arriví (Francisco Arriví Theater), an old restored theater which the Institute of Puerto Rican Culture named in his honor. He was buried in the Cementerio Los Angeles cemetery of the city of Guaynabo. Arriví was survived by his son Francisco Arriví Cros and two grandchildren.

There is a commemorative plaque in the lobby of Ponce's Teatro La Perla that reads: "Francisco Arriví: Poet, Playwright, Essayist, perennial promoter of Puerto Ricanism and of the eternal values of the universal man." It was placed there by the administration of mayor Jose Dapena Thompson (1984–1988).

== See also ==
- List of Puerto Ricans
