= Emilio S. Belaval =

American dramatist

Emilio S. Belaval (born in Fajardo, Puerto Rico on November 8, 1903; died in San Juan, Puerto Rico, 1973) was a lawyer and Supreme Judge and writer from Puerto Rico. He graduated from the University of Puerto Rico. His 1935 work Los cuentos de la Universidad, including the essay Los problemas de la cultura puertorriqueña, dealt with ideas of Puerto Rican identity with Beleval favoring one centering on "its own geography" rather than any universalism. This aspect is said to place his views at variance to Antonio S. Pedreira's Insularismo, despite the works having some similarities and being published close together in time. Some of the works by Belaval were made into theater productions by his countryman, playwright Leopoldo Santiago Lavandero.

A literary award is named for Emilio S. Belaval.

== Partial bibliography ==
=== Short-story collections ===
- El libro azul (1918)
- Cuentos para colegialas (1922)
- Los cuentos de la Universidad (1935)
- Cuentos para fomentar el turismo (1946)
- Cuentos de la plaza fuerte (1963)

=== Theater ===
- Cuando las flores de Pascua son flores de azahar (1939)
- La muerte (1953)
- La novela de una vida simple (1935)
- La presa de los vencedores (1939)
- Hay que decir la verdad (1940)
- La muerte (1953)
- La vida (1959)
- El puerto y la mar (1965)
- Agua de la mala suerte, agua de la buena suerte (1967)

=== Essays ===
- Los problemas de la cultura puertorriqueña (1935)
- El teatro como vehículo de expresión de nuestra cultura (1940)
- Areyto (1948)
- La intríngulis puertorriqueña (1952)
- El ser de lo viviente en el raciovitalismo orteguiano: resumen de una lectura desinteresada (1956)
- Cultura de la esencialidad humana- Literatura espíritu y tiempo (1959)
