= Guilherme Figueiredo =

Brazilian dramatist

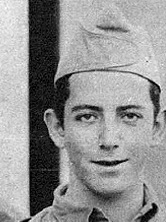
Guilherme Figueiredo (1932)

Guilherme Figueiredo (1915–1997) was a Brazilian dramatist. He is best known for 1949's A God Slept Here (Portuguese: Um Deus Dormiu Id em Casa) and his play The Fox and the Grapes (Portuguese: A raposa e as uvas) in 1953 about Aesop's life, which won various awards, including the Atur Azevedo prize from the Academia Brasileira de Letras.

== Professional Life ==
Figueiredo debuted with the 1948 play Lady Godiva.

Before becoming a dramaturg, he had studied law in Rio de Janeiro, during which time he wrote cultural reviews for the local publications O Jornal and Diário de Notícias. Despite the recognition of his plays, he held a number of other professions, such as translator (primarily from French to Portuguese), professor of theater studies, library director, and artistic director of TV Tupi, a commercial television network.

== Death and personal life ==
He died at age 82 of cardiac arrest in May 1997. At the time of his death, he had been working on a memoir titled "A Bala Perdida".

Guilherme's brother, João Baptista de Oliveira Figueiredo, was the 30th Brazilian president and final president of the military dictatorship that ended in 1985.
