= Rafael Acevedo (writer) =

Playwright, poet, professor and writer

- Born: Rafael Acevedo; 1960; Santurce, San Juan, Puerto Rico
- Education: University of Puerto Rico
- Writing career
- Language: Spanish
- Genres: Poetry, science fiction
- Notable work: instrumentario, Moneda de sal, Exquisito cadáver, among others.
- Literary movement: 80s Generation

Rafael Acevedo (born 1960) is a Puerto Rican poet, novelist, playwright and professor of literature. He was editor of the journal Filo de juego (1983-1987), one of the most important publications of the poets of the '80s Generation (Spanish: Generación de Poetas de los Ochenta) movement. Like some other Puerto Rican writers of the late 20th and early 21st century, his work is highly imaginative and not strongly tied to the independence movement.

== Early life ==
Rafael Acevedo was born in Santurce, San Juan, Puerto Rico. He studied drama at the University of Puerto Rico, where he was taught by Victoria Espinosa.

== Poetry ==
Acevedo has published six books of poetry:

- Contracanto de los superdecidores (1982)
- El retorno del ojo pródigo (1986)
- Libro de islas (1989)
- instrumentario (1996)
- La Moneda de Sal (2006) "Salt Money"
- Elegía Franca (2014)

His poems have been included in several anthologies:

- Antología de poesía puertorriqueña (1993)
- Mal(h)ab(l)ar (1996)
- El límite volcado (2000)
- Los nuevos caníbales, vol. 2: la más reciente poesía del Caribe hispano (2003)

Several of Acevedo's poems have been translated into English:

- "Of Cannibals", "Typology"
- "Silent Dragon"
- "Mirror" and "Measuring Instruments"

== Science fiction ==
His novel Exquisito cadáver won an award from Casa de las Américas in 2001.

Along with Professor Melanie Pérez Ortiz, Acevedo helped to host the First Congress of Science Fiction and Fantasy Literature of the Caribbean at the University of Puerto Rico in 2014.

== Theatrical works ==
Acevedo has written plays, including the following:

- Tres pájaros en una rama (1990)
- Crónica natural (1991)
- Aló quién llama (1994)
