= Myrna Casas =

Puerto Rican playwright (1934–2022)

- Born: January 2, 1934; San Juan, Puerto Rico
- Died: November 9, 2022 (aged 88)
- Education: Vassar College, Boston University College of Fine Arts, New York University
- Occupations: Professor, writer and playwright

Myrna Casas (January 2, 1934 – November 9, 2022) was a Puerto Rican experimental playwright, director, actress, and theatre scholar. She was the co-founder and artistic director of the company Producciones Cisne.

== Early life ==
Casas was born in San Juan to Carmen Busó Carrasquillo and Sixto Casas Semidei. She studied Drama at Vassar College, graduating in 1954, and earned a master's degree in acting at Boston University College of Fine Arts in 1961. She went on to study at New York University where she obtained a doctorate in Theatre education in 1974.

== Career ==
A member of the sixties generation, Casas's work addressed Puerto Rican national identity through both absurdist and realist plays. She also explored the themes of women in patriarchal societies, as in her play Eugenia Victoria Herrera. Her 1988 play The Great Ukrainian Circus (El gran circo Ucraniano) has been performed regularly and examined by scholars.

Casas for many years taught at the University of Puerto Rico in the drama department, which she also directed for several years. She acted in the 1950s and served in the San Juan municipal assembly from 1996 to 2000.

In June 2022, the Columbia University Libraries acquired Casas's papers, including her original annotated manuscripts of all plays written since 1960, as part of its Latino Art and Activism Archives. She has been compared to other Puerto Rican women in theatre, such as Victoria Espinosa and Gilda Navarra.

== Personal life and death ==
Casas died on a November 9, 2022, at the age of 88. She was buried at the Santa María Magdalena de Pazzis Cemetery.

== Works ==
Casas wrote more than 30 plays, including:

- Cristal roto en el tiempo (A Glass Broken in Time) – 1960
- Eugenia Victoria Herrera – 1964
- Absurdos en soledad – 1964
- La trampa (The Trap) – 1974
- No todas lo tienen (They Don't All Have It) – 1975
- Al garete
- Cuarenta años después (Forty Years Later) – 1976
- Crónicas de obsesión
- Tres noches tropicales (Three Tropical Nights)
- Juegos de obsesión
- Las reinas del Chantecler
- El gran circo Ucraniano (The Great Ukrainian Circus) – 1988 (winner of the National Dramaturgy award of the Circle of Puerto Rican Drama Critics)
- Este país no existe (This Country Doesn't Exist) – 1993

Casas also wrote an opera libretto, El mensajero de plata.

== Honors ==
Casas received honors from the Center for Advanced Studies on Puerto Rico and the Caribbean (2013), Ateneo Puertorriqueño (2005), the University of Tennessee (2006), the Puerto Rican Senate (2004), and SOGEM (Sociedad de Escritores de México) (1990).

In 2019 the Universidad del Sagrado Corazón dedicated the celebration of World Theatre Day to Casas.

== See also ==
- List of Puerto Ricans
- Dean Zayas - another Puerto Rican playwright
