= Luis Daniel Rivera (actor) =

Puerto Rican actor and politician

- Born: August 4, 1946 (age 78); Utuado, Puerto Rico
- Occupation(s): Actor, politician
- Years active: 1964–present

Luis Daniel Rivera (born August 4, 1946, in Utuado, Puerto Rico) is a Puerto Rican actor and radio announcer. He is better known for his participation in Puerto Rican, Dominican Republic and Mexican telenovelas. He has also participated in some films.

Rivera is also a former member of the New Progressive Party or "PNP", a political party which advocates for a possible, future Puerto Rican statehood (as a 51st state of the United States). Rivera, however, says that, since retiring as a member of that party, he prefers not to talk publicly about political issues or ideologies.

== Early life ==
Rivera was born on August 4, 1946, in Utuado. He is the son of David Rivera Serrano, who was a farmer. Rivera's father was ill, and as a consequence, Rivera wanted, as a child, to study medicine so he could cure his father's illnesses. When he was only six years old, Rivera got the chance to speak in front of an audience for the first time, when asked to read a poem in front of his first-grade schoolmates. Rivera went both to elementary and junior high school at Colegio San Miguel in Utuado, and he also participated at the local Catholic cathedral as an altar boy, before he and his family moved, as a teen, to the Puerto Rican city of Manatí.

Rivera attended high school in Manati; there, his Spanish teacher encouraged him to become an actor. One of the people who saw him at Manati was the noted Puerto Rican theater figure, Leopoldo Santiago Lavandero, who during that era also discovered the talents of another legendary Puerto Rican actor, Mayagüez native Adrian Garcia.

Soon after, Rivera decided to move to Puerto Rico's capital, the northern city of San Juan, where he enrolled in an acting class taught by Laura Martell and by another legendary Puerto Rican television (and theater) actor, Edmundo Rivera Alvarez (no relation). In San Juan, Rivera worked as a radio announcer, and he made his theater debut, playing Jesus Christ in a play titled "Pasión y Muerte" ("Passion and Death").

== Professional acting career ==
Soon after, by 1964, Rivera made his television debut, acting in telenovelas. He also acted in radionovelas-soap operas broadcast live on radio stations-and, to supplement his income, he also got a job at the circulations department of the famous Puerto Rican newspaper, El Mundo, and another one, at the Tres Monjitas milk company, where he was a wholesale sales agent for a time.

In 1970, Rivera participated in what is sometimes considered a telenovela classic, "Tomiko". He also acted in "La Mentira" ("The Lie"), and in the major late 1970s hit, Cristina Bazan, where he had the chance of acting alongside Venezuelan singer and actor Jose Luis Rodriguez and Puerto Rican actress Johanna Rosaly.

When Rivera was between 25 and 26 years old, in 1972, he was contacted by canal 2's Esther Palés, who offered the young man a contract with that channel. He soon starred in an afternoon telenovela and, in 1974, he was cast for the telenovela "El Hijo de Ángela María" ("Ángela María's Son"), which became a major hit across Latin America and also spanned a movie, also named "El Hijo de Ángela María". At those two productions, he shared credits with Johanna Rosaly again, and with Cuban actor and show host Rolando Barral.

Around that era, he also participated as a show host, in a Puerto Rican television show named "Super Show Goya" (sponsored by Goya Foods) alongside Luz Odilia Font and Chilean Enrique Maluenda. In 1977, Rivera acted in the Mexican film "Santo en Oro Negro" ("Santo in Black Gold"), alongside legendary Mexican Lucha Libre wrestler, Santo.

During 1983, Rivera accepted an offer by Chilean producer Valentín Pimstein to work in Mexico, on a telenovela named "La Fiera" ("The Wild One"), where Rivera worked alongside legendary Mexican actors Guillermo Capetillo and Victoria Ruffo, among others. La Fiera was a major hit in Mexico, Peru and Brazil, giving Rivera international exposure in those countries. It was also shown in Puerto Rico and other Latin American countries.

In the Dominican Republic, Rivera acted in a telenovela named "Llanto en mi Ciudad" ("A Cry in my City").

Rivera got an offer to either establish himself permanently in Mexico or work as an actor in the South American country of Peru; he preferred to return to his home-country of Puerto Rico to be near his by-now growing family. This took place in 1985, when he was invited by fellow Puerto Ricans, actresses Angela Meyer and Camille Carrion, to join their production company, "Producciones Meca", for a project that company had with the by-then returning canal 11. Rivera's return to Puerto Rican television came on a show named "Casa de Mujeres" ("Women's House") His association with Carrion and Meyer led to him being cast in another well-known Puerto Rican telenovela, "La Isla" ("The Island").

In 1988, Rivera recorded a television commercial for a restaurant located in Plaza Rio Hondo, Bayamón, Puerto Rico, named "La Cazuela".

Ever since, he has been semi-retired from acting, due in part to Puerto Rican television networks down-scaling the number of telenovelas produced in the Caribbean island beginning in the late 1980s. Rivera later became a politician for the statehood-claiming New Progressive Party, but he has since retired from that as well and taken a basic non-political standing every time he is asked about politics on interviews ever since. He has returned to acting from time to time.

In addition, Rivera was involved with a project named el "Projecto Dramatico Radial de la Corporacion de Puerto Rico Para la Difusion Publica" (the "Puerto Rican Corporation For Public Diffusion's Radio-Drama Project"), which was a project aimed at giving Puerto Rican actors and others indirectly involved in the acting profession (such as directors, technicians, make-up artists and the such) steady work. He claims to have proposed the project to then governor Rafael Hernandez Colon at first, but that it was the next governor, Pedro Rosselló, who finally accepted it. As part of that project, many shows, such as comedies, radionovelas and other dramatic shows were produced.

== Personal life ==
Rivera got married, at the young age of 18, to Leonor Marín, during 1964. Their children include son Luis Daniel Rivera, Jr. (born in 1965) and daughters Waleska and Lizbeth Rivera (born in 1970 and 1972, respectively). He has various grandchildren and, at least, one publicly known great-granddaughter.

On June 27, 1985, Rivera and his wife were among the 257 passengers on an American Airlines flight, flight 633, a DC-10 which crashed during take-off from Luis Munoz Marin International Airport in San Juan on its way to Dallas, Texas. Everyone survived the crash, in which Rivera suffered minor injuries and required medical attention.

He supported Pedro Rosselló for governor of Puerto Rico in the 1992 Puerto Rico elections.

== See also ==
- List of Puerto Ricans
