= Luis A. Ferré Performing Arts Center =

Performing arts center in Santurce, San Juan, Puerto Rico

Centro de Bellas Artes Luis A. Ferré
- "Bellas Artes de Santurce"
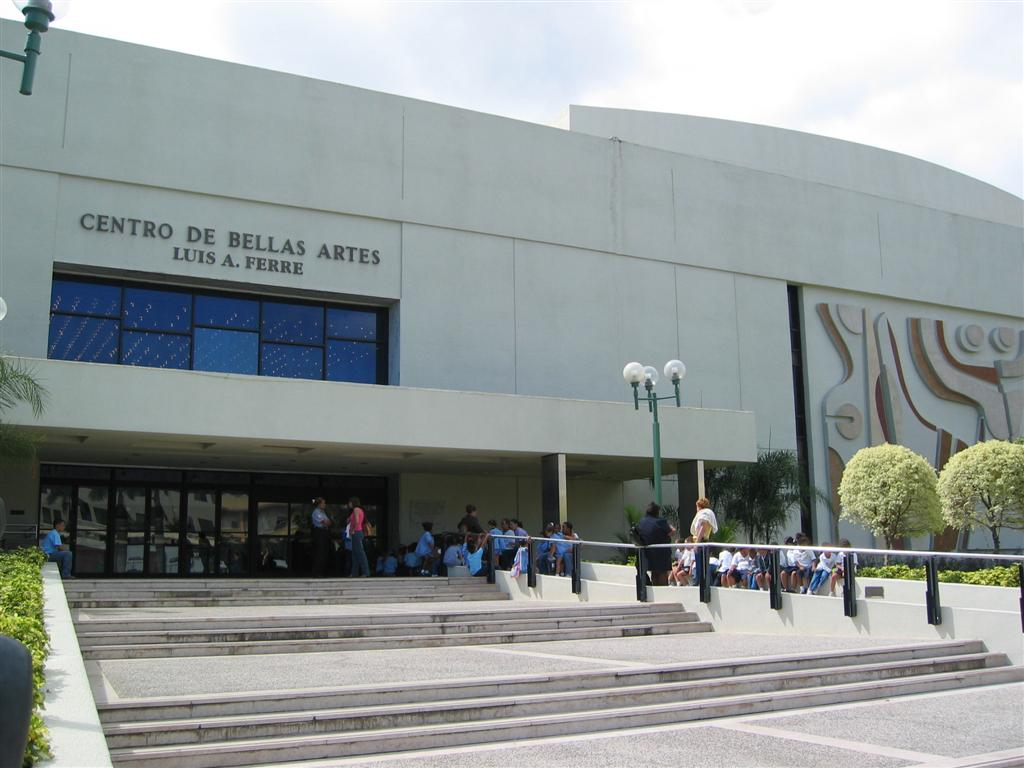
- Interactive map of Centro de Bellas Artes Luis A. Ferré
- Former names: Centro de Bellas Artes de Puerto Rico
- Address: Ponce de León Ave, Parada 22; Santurce, PR 00940
- Location: San Juan, Puerto Rico
- Coordinates: 18°26′51″N 66°4′9″W
- Owner: Corporation of the Performing Arts Center of Puerto Rico
- Capacity: Sala Antonio Paoli: 1,945; Sala Sinfónica Pablo Casals: 1,300; Sala René Marquéz: 781; Sala Carlos Marichal: 210; Café Teatro Sylvia Rexach: 200
- Type: Concert hall, Opera house, Theatre, Performing arts center

Construction
- Built: 1981
- Opened: April 9, 1981
- Cost: $11,372,000

Website
- www.cba.gobierno.pr

The Luis A. Ferré Performing Arts Center (Centro de Bellas Artes Luis A. Ferré in Spanish) is a multi-use performance centre located in the barrio of Santurce in San Juan, Puerto Rico. It features three main concert and theater halls for plays, ballet, operas and concerts. It was renamed in 1994 after the late Puerto Rican philanthropist, politician and Governor of Puerto Rico, Luis A. Ferré.

The Center opened on April 9, 1981 under the administration of Governor Carlos Romero Barceló after ten years of planning, project financing, and construction. Since then, it has become the most important performing arts venue in the Puerto Rican capital, presenting the highest level of commercial theater in Puerto Rico along with ballets and operas, and also hosting artists such as Plácido Domingo and Menudo. The center is home to the Puerto Rico Symphony Orchestra and the annual Casals Festival.

In January 2019, Lin-Manuel Miranda’s musical Hamilton began its third touring production at the venue, with Miranda reprising the title role of Founding Father and Secretary of Treasury, Alexander Hamilton, with higher praise than his original run on Broadway. Miranda returned to the venue after nine years since he reprised the role of Usnavi exclusively in San Juan during the North American touring production of In the Heights, which he also wrote.

== History ==
On February 17, 1967, Francisco de Arriví lobbied in favor of the project, claiming that if it didn't proceed local theater would be "estranged". Ulises Barros was selected as the head engineer of the project. In December 1970, the project received a million in funds from the government. Following the end of the Luis A. Ferré administration, additional assignments of $2,722,000 and $3,100,000 were made, with the total reaching $18,000,000. The building was inaugurated on April 9, 1981, amidst protests against the Romero Barceló administration that responded to the approval of the "cultural laws" that created the AFAC. Among the speakers were Ricardo Alegría, Arriví, Edwin Reyes and Clemente Soto Vélez.

Alegría, who had opposed Senate Project 1157, which transferred the CBA to the Fondo de Becas para el Arte y la Cultura (AFAC) as a public corporation, calling it "cultural piracy" for taking a project that was almost finished, lobbied to the governor transferring control of the CBA to the Institute of Puerto Rican Culture (ICP). On February 15, 1980, Arriví delivered a speech supporting the ICP as administrator of the CBA, citing a long-standing history of international cultural initiatives. In 1985, the Centro de Bella's Artes was transferred to the ICP and led by a subdirector independent of the institution. In 1993, there was an initiative to name the Centro de Bella's Artes. Juan Mari Bras proposed naming it after Alegría, who declined, having drafted a law against issuing the name of living persons to public projects or buildings/monuments. It was ultimately named after Luis A. Ferré.

== Facilities ==
The Center features four main concert and theater halls, two eateries and a central outdoor plaza, each with its own unique features:

- Antonio Paoli Festival Hall – Dedicated to a Puerto Rican opera singer, it is the largest hall of the center. Seating is between 1,875 and 1,945, and features two stories with VIP balconies, world-class acoustic system, and a 62-by-50-foot (19 by 15 m) stage perfect for scenic musical performances including, operas, ballet, popular music shows, and symphonic concerts.
- René Marqués Theater Hall – Dedicated to one of Puerto Rico's most famous playwrights and essayists, this hall seats between 748 and 781 guests and with a stage measuring 42 by 40 feet, it is specially designed for plays and musical performances.
- Carlos Marichal Performance Hall – dedicated to a respected Puerto Rican set and costume designer, the hall features seating for 210 guests in an intimate arena-styled theater.

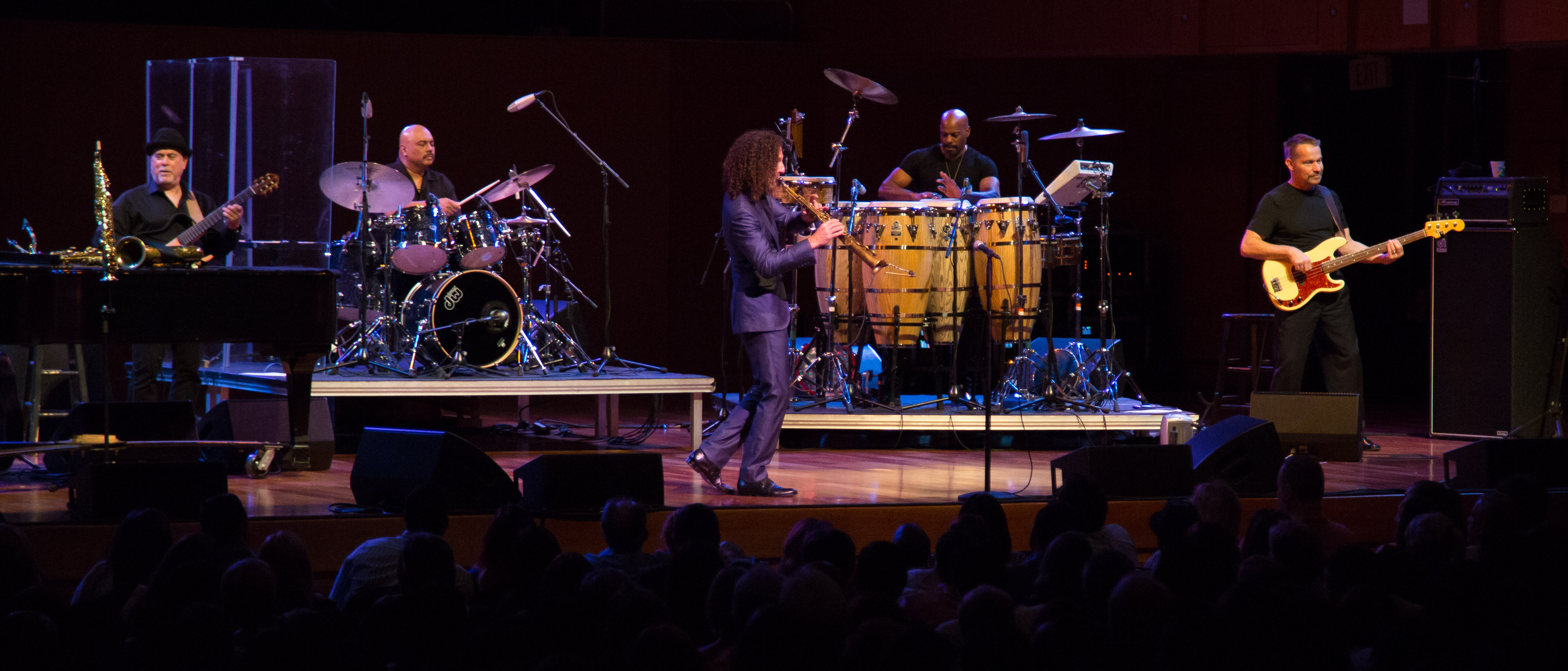
Kenny G in the Sala Sinfónica

- Sala Sinfónica Pablo Casals – symphony hall dedicated to the Spanish Catalan cellist and conductor best remembered for the recording the Bach Cello Suites he made from 1936 to 1939. The $34 million building, designed by Rodolfo Fernandez and Acentech Incorporated's Studio A, seats 1,300 and serves as the new home of the Puerto Rico Symphony Orchestra.
- Juan Morel Campos Plaza, dedicated to the Puerto Rican composer of danzas is located right in front of the center's main entrance, it is a large open plaza featuring a pair of sculptures called The Muses and the Las Tablas Restaurant, and is available for outdoor activities and presentations for 800 guests.
- Sylvia Rexach Theater Café – Designed to be a fourth, but smaller, concert hall, the Café opened in 1988 and offers a relaxed nightclub theme for up to 200 guests with a small stage for intimate performances. A xylographic mural by famed local artist Antonio Martorell decorates its walls and grants homage to Sylvia Rexach, the famous Puerto Rican bolero singer and composer.
- Las Tablas Restaurant (formerly the Arts Pavilion) – is a restaurant within the Juan Morel Campos Plaza and features an award-winning architectural design. The restaurant, whose theme literally embodies the phrase The Beauty of the Caribbean, is owned by international pop star Luis Fonsi and local music and concert producer Tony Mojena. Its menu, developed by Giovanna Huyke, is built around the theme the taste of music, and consists mostly of local traditional foods prepared by its in-house chef Alexis Bartolomei.

== Surrounding art ==
The center is surrounded by various art expositions, including murals, paintings, and sculptures. The two largest halls feature art expositions which distinguishes each one:

- In the Antonio Paoli Festival Hall's second floor, a 30-by-15-foot (9.1 by 4.6 m) mural titled La Plena by Rafael Tufiño is on display and represents twelve famous Puerto Rican plenas by local songwriter Manuel “Canario” Jiménez: Cortaron an Elena; Temporal; El Perro de San Jerónimo; Josefina; Santa María; Tintorera del Mar; Fuego, Fuego, Fuego; Monchín del Alma; Cuando las Mujeres; Tanta Vanidad; Lola; and El Diablo Colorao. The mural was created 30 years before the opening of the Center between 1952 and 1954. It was moved to its current place in 1987 after a three-year restoration project by Anton Konrad.
- In the René Marqués Hall, a 20-by-39-foot (6.1 by 11.9 m) stained glass exposition titled Form and Tropical Crystals by local artist Luis Hernández Cruz illuminates its lobby with 5,700 multi-colored pieces of crystal arranged to showcase themes related to the sea, the forest, the sky and the overall tropical ambiance.

Near the entrance of the center, various expositions greet guests and visitors, including a 40-foot (12 m) aluminum sculpture by Luis Torruella titled Melodic Reflection. However, the main art theme of the center's entrance are The Muses. These are two separate works of art, one being an assortment of 6-foot-tall (1.8 m) bronze female sculptures along the Juan Morel Campos Plaza, by Annex Burgos; and the second being a large mural at the center's façade (pictured above), made from a mixture concrete and crystal stones and designed by Augusto Marín. Each muse represents the different arts and cultures which the Center embraces, including local and classical music, theater, literature, dance, films, architecture, sculptures, and painting.
