= Manuel Tamayo y Baus =

Spanish dramatist (1829–1898)

The Most Excellent Manuel Tamayo
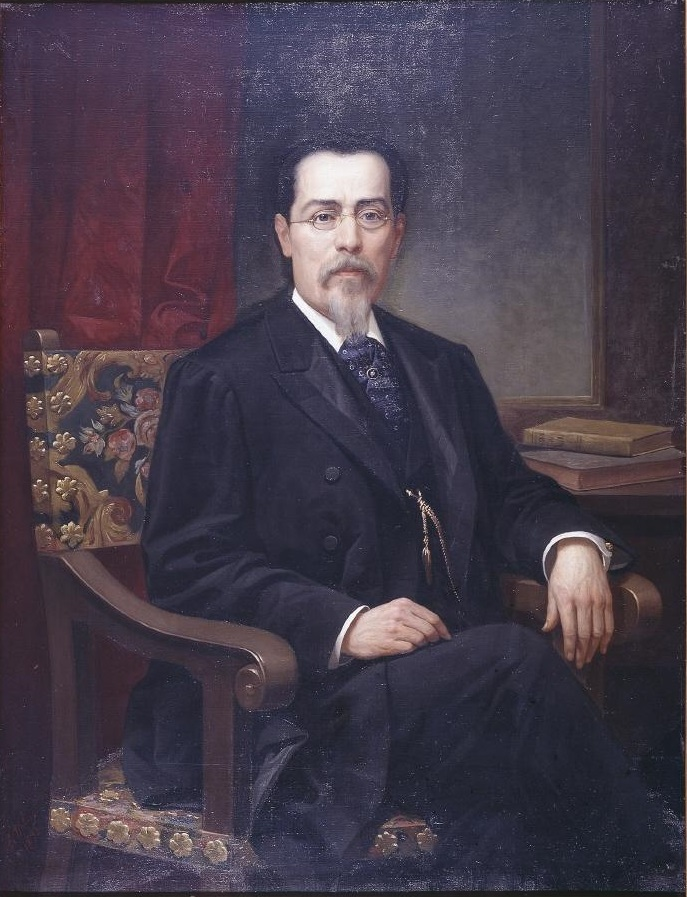
- Portrait at the National Library (1892)
- Born: Manuel Tamayo y Baus; 15 September 1829; Madrid, Spain
- Died: 20 June 1898 (aged 68); Madrid, Spain

Seat O of the Real Academia Española
- In office 12 June 1859 – 20 June 1898
- Preceded by: Juan González Cabo-Reluz
- Succeeded by: Emilio Ferrari

Manuel Tamayo y Baus (15 September 1829 – 20 June 1898) was a Spanish dramatist.

== Life ==
He was born at Madrid, into a family connected with the theatre, his mother being the eminent actress Joaquina Baus. She appeared as Geneviève de Brabant in an arrangement from the French made by Tamayo when he was in his twelfth year. Through the influence of his uncle, Antonio Gil y Zárate, minister of education, Tamayo's independence was secured by his nomination to a post in a government office. The earliest of his printed pieces, Juana de Arco (1847), is an arrangement from Schiller, and Una Aventura de Richelieu, which the author has not cared to preserve, is said to be an imitation of Alexandre Dumas, père. The general idea of his Angela (1852) was derived from Schiller's Kabale und Liebe, but the atmosphere is Spanish, the situations are original, and the phrasing is Tamayo's own.

His first great success was Virginia (1853), a dramatic essay in Alfieri's manner, remarkable for its ingenuity and noble diction. In 1854 Tamayo was expelled from his post by the new Liberal government, but was restored before long by Cándido Nocedal, a minister who had been struck by the young man's talent. He collaborated with Aureliano Fernández-Guerra y Orbe in writing La Ricahembra (1854), a historical drama which recalls the vigor of Lope de Vega. The Madness of Love (1855), in which Juana la Loca, the passionate, love-sick daughter of Isabel the Catholic, figures as the chief personage, established Tamayo's reputation as Spain's leading playwright. Hija y Madre (1855) was a failure, and La Bola de Nieve (1856) is notable solely for its excellent workmanship.

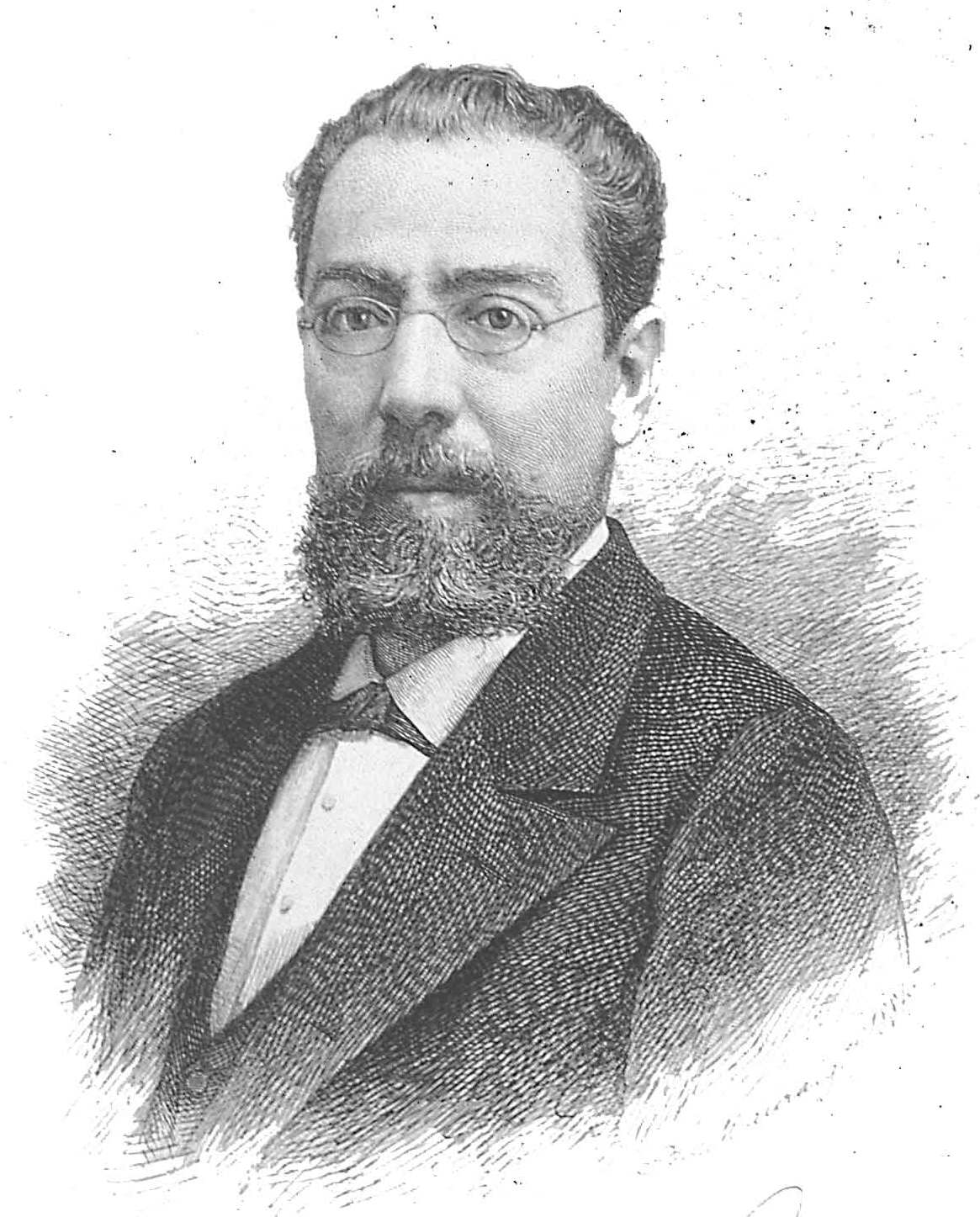
Manuel Tamayo y Baus (1884)

It is unfortunate that Tamayo's straitened means forced him to put original work aside and to adapt pieces from the French. Examples of this sort are fairly numerous. Lo Positivo (1862), imitated from Adrien-Augustin-Léon Laya's Duc Job, is well-nigh forgotten, though the Spanish version is a dexterous piece of stagecraft and contains some elements of original value. Del dicho al Jiecho (1864) is from La Pierre de touche of Jules Sandeau and Émile Augier, and a pleasing proverb, Más vale Maña que Fuerza (1866) is a great improvement upon Mme Caroline Bertons Diplomatie du Ménage.

The revolution of 1868, which cost Tamayo his post at the San Isidro Library, is indirectly responsible for No hay mal que por bien no venga (1868), a clever arrangement of Le Feu au Couvent, by Henri Murger's friend, Théodore Barrière. During these seven years Tamayo produced only one original piece, Lances de Honor (1863), which turned upon the immorality of duelling, and led to a warm discussion among the public. Written in prose, the piece is inspired by a breath of medieval piety which had not been felt in the Spanish theatre since the 17th century. This renascence of an old-world motive has induced many critics to consider Lances de Honor as Tamayos best work, but that distinction should be accorded rather to Un Drama nuevo (1867), a play in which the author has ventured to place Shakespeare and Yorick upon the scene.

Los Hombres de bien (1870) was Tamayo's final contribution to the Spanish stage. His last years were spent in recasting his Virginia, and the result of his efforts may be read in the posthumous edition of his Obras (Madrid, 1898–99). In 1858 Tamayo was elected a member of the Spanish Academy, to which he afterwards became permanent secretary; and in 1884 the Conservative minister, Alejandro Pidal y Mon, appointed him director of the National Library.
