= Manuel Méndez Ballester =

Puerto Rican writer (1909–2002)

Manuel Méndez Ballister
- Don Manuel Méndez Ballester
- Born: August 4, 1909; Aguadilla, Puerto Rico
- Died: January 24, 2002 (aged 92); Hato Rey, Puerto Rico

Manuel Méndez Ballester (4 August 1909 – 24 January 2002), was a Puerto Rican writer who also worked in journalism, radio broadcasting, television and teaching.

== Life and career ==
José Manuel Epifanio Méndez Ballester, better known as Manuel Méndez Ballester was born in Aguadilla, Puerto Rico, in 1909 to parents Andrés Méndez Licíaga and Juana Ballester González. In Aguadilla, he was raised and received his primary education. Relocating to New York in his teens, he initiated secondary schooling, but upon his return to Puerto Rico, continued his studies on his own. While still in his adolescence, and due to economic urgency, he began to work as a clerk in several commercial houses of Aguadilla and San Juan. He later served in the offices of the District Court of Aguadilla. His next profession was as the Administrator of the Central Coloso sugar cane refinery, a task that allowed him first hand account of the social life, customs and problems of the sugar cane workers. This association and knowledge would prove of great value for the development of his literary role as a dramatist.

Méndez Ballester began to participate in and became fond of local theater productions, and by 1931, his journalistic ventures led him to be collaborator and then editor of Atalaya y Letras, a local cultural periodical in Aguadilla.

Méndez Ballester enrolled at the University of Puerto Rico, Rio Piedras Campus, seeking to become a lawyer, but before finalizing the first year of studies he dropped out to pursue a career in radio programming for the Department of Public Education. He returned to the university in 1935 as an evaluator and assessor of teachers for workers whom the Administration of Reconstruction of Puerto Rico sponsored.

Isla Cerrera, written in 1937, was his first novel, and was a historical view of the early days of Spanish colonization. El Clamor de Los Surcos, his first popular play in 1938, received high accolades by Ateneo Puertorriqueño. His classic tragedy in three acts, Tiempo Muerto, premiered in 1940. This is considered to be his masterpiece and the one most associated with Méndez Ballester. It is set in the sugar cane fields of Aguadilla and deals with the workers during the off season or "dead time," thus the title.

In 1943, he organized la Sociedad General de Autores (General Society of Authors) with whom he presented two new drama works: Hilaricón in 1943, and Nuestros Días in 1944. He then developed a more comical than satirical style with his El Misterio del Castillo in 1946, Un Fantasma Desentito in 1950, the farce Es de Vidrios la Mujer in 1952, and El Curioso Impertinente. In 1958 he wrote Encrucijada, and El Milagro in 1961, followed by La Feria o El Mono con la Lata en el Rabo (1963). In 1965 he wrote Bienvenido Don Goyito, a popular play which is still revered today. In 1968 he published Arriba las Mujeres, in 1970, the dramatic piece La Invasión, ó Jugando al Divorcio and in 1975 back to comedy with Los Cocorocos.

Méndez Ballester was interested in politics and became a senator for the city of San Juan, and upon his retirement from politics dedicated himself to become Puerto Rico's foremost dramatist and man of letters. He died on January 23, 2002, at Auxilio Mutuo Hospital in Hato Rey, Puerto Rico, at age 92. There was a solemn funeral in his parents' native town of San Sebastián, then a procession to Aguadilla, where there was a service at the Inter American University, where he had donated all his literary papers and historical documents to a library named in his honor.

=== Luz Odilia Font ===
Mendez Ballester is credited with discovering the talents of a young actress, his then neighbor in San Juan, the also San Sebastian native Luz Odilia Font.

== See also ==
- List of Puerto Rican writers
- List of Puerto Ricans
- Puerto Rican literature
- Miguel Ángel Suárez
