= The Madness of Love (play) =

1885 play by Manual Tamayo y Baus

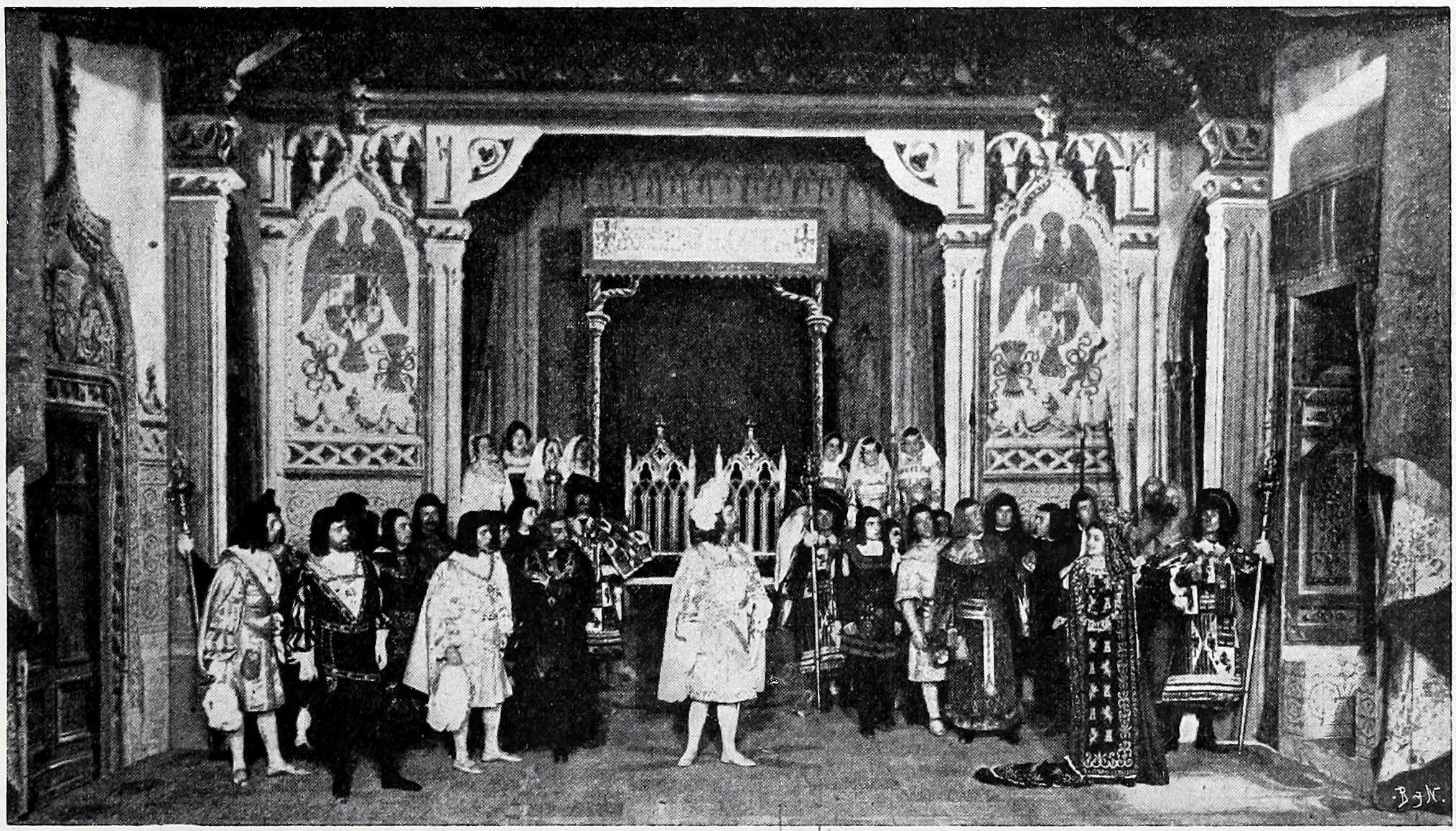
Act 3, scene 5 of the play as performed by the company of the Teatro Español, circa 1901, featuring Fernando Díaz de Mendoza as the King and María Guerrero as the Queen

The Madness of Love (Spanish: La locura de amor) is an 1855 historical drama play written by Manuel Tamayo y Baus.

== Plot ==
Tracking the plight of Queen Joanna of Castile, the play consists of 5 acts set in 1506 in Castile; specifically in Tudela de Duero (Act 1), in an inn near Tudela (Act 2) and in the Palace of the Constables of Castile in Burgos (last three acts).

== Premiere and reception ==
The play premiered at the Teatro del Príncipe on 12 January 1855. It proved to be a commercial and international success. A very influential 19th-century work, it has been adapted to film several times.
