= List of political parties in Puerto Rico =

This list of political parties in Puerto Rico identifies notable political parties in Puerto Rico, both past and present. Notes:

- Puerto Rico has a 'first past the post' electoral system, in which a voter can vote by party, by candidate or both. To qualify as an official political party (and thus be able to appear on the printed state electoral ballot), a party must meet the criteria set forth by the Puerto Rico Electoral Law.
- For political parties in the broader United States, see List of political parties in the United States.

== Registered parties ==
=== Active ===
As of 2026, Puerto Rico has five registered electoral parties:

| Party | Current leader | Year founded | Ideology | Political position | Gubernatorial vote (2024) | Senate | House | Mayors |
|---|---|---|---|---|---|---|---|---|
| Popular Democratic Party (PPD); Partido Popular Democrático | Pablo José Hernández Rivera | 1938 | Pro-Commonwealth; Liberalism; Social liberalism | Center-left | 273,162 (21.47%) | 6 / 27 | 13 / 51 | 41 / 78 |
| New Progressive Party (PNP); Partido Nuevo Progresista | Jenniffer González-Colón | 1967 | Puerto Rico statehood; Centrism; Factions: Conservatism; Liberalism | Center to center-right | 524,373 (41.22%) | 19 / 27 | 36 / 51 | 36 / 78 |
| Citizens' Victory Movement (MVC); Movimiento Victoria Ciudadana | Eva Prados | 2019 | Progressivism; Social democracy; Anti-corruption; Anti-colonialism | Left-wing | 1,522 (0.12%) | 0 / 27 | 0 / 51 | 0 / 51 |
| Puerto Rican Independence Party (PIP); Partido Independentista Puertorriqueño | Rubén Berríos | 1946 | Left-wing nationalism; Democratic socialism; Puerto Rican independence | Center-left | 391,945 (30.81%) | 2 / 27 | 3 / 51 | 0 / 78 |
| Project Dignity (PD); Proyecto Dignidad | Nilda Pérez | 2019 | Christian democracy; Conservatism; Anti-corruption | Center-right to right-wing | 81,251 (6.39%) | 1 / 27 | 1 / 51 | 1 / 78 |

=== Inactive ===
==== Under United States sovereignty, 1898–present ====
The existing parties in Puerto Rico at the time of change of sovereignty in 1898 reinvented themselves into parties with by-laws, platforms and ideologies consistent with the new political reality brought about by the change of sovereignty. The Barbosistas, followers of Jose Celso Barbosa and mostly aligned with Partido Autonomista Ortodoxo, formed the Partido Republicano Puertorriqueño, while the Muñocistas, followers of Luis Muñoz Rivera and mostly aligned with Partido Liberal Puertorriqueño, formed Partido Federal.

| Name in English | Name in Spanish | Abbreviation | Ideology | Created | Disbanded |
|---|---|---|---|---|---|
| Federal Party | Partido Federal | | Pro-autonomy | 1899 | 1900s |
| Puerto Rican Republican Party | Partido Republicano Puertorriqueño | | Pro-statehood | 1899 | 1924 |
| Labor Party | Partido Obrero | PSPR | Socialism, Pro-statehood | 1899 | 1915 |
| Union Party | Partido Unión | | Pro-independence | 1900s | 1930s |
| Socialist Party | Partido Socialista de Puerto Rico | PO | Socialism | 1915 | 1950s |
| Nationalist Party of Puerto Rico | Partido Nacionalista de Puerto Rico | PNPR | Pro-independence | 1920s | 1965 (Note: Splinters of the Nationalist Party remain active until today.) |
| Puerto Rican Alliance | Alianza Puertorriqueña | AP | Centrism | 1924 | 1932 |
| Coalition | Coalición | | Pro-statehood | 1924 | 1940 |
| Republican Union | Unión Republicana | | Pro-statehood | 1930s | 1960s |
| Puerto Rican Communist Party | Partido Comunista Puertorriqueño | PCP | Marxism–Leninism, pro-independence | 1930s | 1990s |
| Liberal Party of Puerto Rico | Partido Liberal de Puerto Rico | | Pro-independence | 1932 | 1948 |
| Puerto Rican Reformist Party | Partido Reformista Puertorriqueño | PRP | | 1948 | 1948 |
| Transparent, Authentic and Complete Liberal Party | Partido Liberal Neto, Auténtico y Completo | | | 1937 | 1948 |
| Republican Statehood Party | Partido Estadista Republicano | PER | Pro-statehood | 1956 | 1968 |
| Christian Action Party | Partido Acción Cristiana | PAC | Christian politics | 1957 | 1965 |
| People's Party | Partido del Pueblo | PP | | 1960s | 1970s |
| Puerto Rican Union Party | Partido Unión Puertorriqueña | PUP | | 1969 | 1972 |
| Puerto Rican Socialist Party | Partido Socialista Puertorriqueño | PSP | Socialism, pro-independence | 1970s | 1990s |
| Puerto Rican Renewal Party | Partido Renovación Puertorriqueña | PRP | Pro-statehood | 1983 | 1987 |
| Puerto Ricans for Puerto Rico Party | Partido Puertorriqueños Por Puerto Rico | PPPR | Green politics | 2007 | 2012 |
| Sovereign Union Movement | Movimiento Unión Soberanista | MUS | Pro-independence | 2010 | 2012 |
| Working People's Party | Partido del Pueblo Trabajador | PPT | Left-wing populism, Democratic socialism | 2012 | 2016 |

==== Under Spanish sovereignty, 1870–1898 ====
There were no political parties in Puerto Rico until 1870. Bolívar Pagán states that the following parties were present in Puerto Rico during the years of Spanish sovereignty. (Note: Bolívar Pagán also states that a Union Autonomista Liberal existed, a party that again attempted to merge again the Liberals and Autonomista Ortodoxo, but this party had a fleeting existence.)

| Name in English | Name in Spanish | Leader | Platform / Ideology | Created | Disbanded |
|---|---|---|---|---|---|
| Unconditional Spanish Party | Partido Incondicional Español | Jose Ramon Fernandez | Conservative | 1870 | 1898 |
| Liberal Reformist Party | Partido Liberal Reformista | Pedro Geronimo Goyco | Liberalism | 1870 | 1898 |
| Puerto Rican Autonomist Party | Partido Autonomista Puertorriqueño | R. B de Castro, later Celso Barbosa and Muñoz Rivera (Note: Internal split on 13 February 1897) | Self-rule under Spanish sovereignty | 1887 | 1898 |
| Orthodox Autonomist Party (Note: Partido Autonomista Ortodoxo [Orthodox Autonomist Party] also called Partido Puro y Radical [Pure and Radical Party].) | Partido Autonomista Ortodoxo | Jose Celso Barbosa | Puerto Rican independence | 1897 | 1899 |
| Puerto Rican Liberal Party | Partido Liberal Puertorriqueño | Luis Muñoz Rivera | Puerto Rican independence Had pact with Liberal Party of Spain | 1897 | 1899 |

== Unregistered parties ==
A number of unregistered political parties and organizations exist in Puerto Rico outside of the electoral arena. These organizations span the entire political spectrum:

- Hostosian National Independence Movement (MINH) – (Umbrella organization in favor of pro independence and nationalist movements) – Movimiento Independentista Nacional Hostosiano
- Pro ELA – In favor of a freely associated republic status.
- Puerto Rican Nationalist Party
- Communist Party of Puerto Rico
- Socialist Front – An umbrella of socialist organizations.
- Socialist Workers Movement – Socialist Revolutionary organization, with strong bases in the trade union and student movement. Bandera Roja – Periodical, in Spanish
- United Statehooders – Estadistas Unidos.

== Affiliates of federal-level United States parties ==
Unlike the political parties listed above, which are eligible for registration with the Comisión Estatal de Elecciones (CEE) upon fulfilling CEE requirements, the following parties exist as affiliates of American parties and participate in the U.S. primaries of the corresponding American parties at the federal level. Also, unlike the Puerto Rican political parties above, all of which are based in Puerto Rico, these parties are headquartered in mainland United States.

- Democratic Party of Puerto Rico – (Spanish: Partido Demócrata de Puerto Rico) is the Puerto Rico affiliate of the U.S. national Democratic Party.
- Libertarian Party of Puerto Rico – (Spanish: Partido Libertario) is a Puerto Rico affiliate of the U.S. national Libertarian Party
- Republican Party of Puerto Rico – (Spanish: Partido Republicano de Puerto Rico) is the Puerto Rico affiliate of the U.S. national Republican Party

== See also ==
- Historia de los Partidos Políticos Puertorriqueños (1898-1956)
- Politics of Puerto Rico
- Political party strength in Puerto Rico
- Elections in Puerto Rico
- Puerto Rican Independence Movement
