= Politics of Puerto Rico =

The politics of Puerto Rico take place in the framework of a democratic republic form of government that is under the jurisdiction and sovereignty of the United States Congress as an organized unincorporated territory. Since the 1898 invasion of Puerto Rico by the United States during the Spanish–American War, politics in Puerto Rico have been significantly shaped by its status as territory of the United States. The nature of Puerto Rico's political relationship with the United States is the subject of ongoing debate in Puerto Rico, in the United States, the United Nations and the international community, with all major political parties in the archipelago calling it a colonial relationship.

The government of the Commonwealth of Puerto Rico is divided into three branches: executive, legislative and judicial, as established by the Constitution of Puerto Rico. The executive power is exercised by the executive branch, which is headed by the governor, advised by a cabinet of secretaries that are independent of the legislature. Legislative power is vested upon the Legislature. Judicial power is exercised by the judiciary, consisting of the Tribunal Supremo de Puerto Rico, the Tribunal de Apelaciones (English: Court of Appeals), and Tribunal de Primera Instancia (English: Courts of First Instance). There is also a Federal Court to hear cases of a federal nature or with federal jurisdiction.

Puerto Rico's governor, who is the head of government, and the members of the legislature are elected every four years by popular vote. Puerto Rico's legislature is a bicameral body consisting of a Senate and a House. The members of the judicial branch are appointed by the Governor with the approval of the Senate to serve until they reach age 70. Due to the status of Puerto Rico as a territory of the United States, its residents cannot vote in the U.S. presidential elections.

Politics in Puerto Rico revolve around a multi-party political system. The politics of Puerto Rico are dominated by three political parties: the Partido Nuevo Progresista (PNP), the Partido Popular Democratico (PPD), and, to a lesser extent, the Partido Independentista Puertorriqueño (PIP).

== Political history and political parties ==
=== 19th century ===
One year after the United States invasion of the island, Dr. José Celso Barbosa embraced the idea of annexation as a U.S. state as a solution to the colonial situation and founded the Partido Republicano Puertorriqueño in 1899.

Celso Barbosa had been the leader in the Autonomist Party that favored a republican government for Spain. For much of the 19th Century, the principal parties favored Puerto Rico becoming another of the Spanish provinces on equal footing with the mainland provinces in Spanish Europe; such standing was given twice to Puerto Rico and other Spanish overseas territories under liberal governments, but it was revoked many times - before the establishment of the Spanish constitutional monarchy - every time the Spanish monarchs were successful in regaining their royal power during the first half of the 19th century.

In this context, and following the U.S. annexation of Puerto Rico at the end of the Spanish American War of 1898, Dr. Barbosa returned to the original idea of equal footing, but this time as a full constituent member of the American Republic.

In contrast, Roman Baldorioty de Castro, had been the leader of another faction inside the Autonomist Party, supported a territorial governance for Puerto Rico under Spain, similar to the Canadian model developed by the British. Before Baldorioty de Castro, other leaders had mentioned the possibility of autonomy, generally as an answer to the Spanish insistence in instituting special laws to govern the Spanish territories and overseas provinces.

During the last twenty years under the Spanish flag, the majority of the local parties, with the exception of the Partido Incondicional Español (Unconditional Spanish Party) embraced the idea of autonomy. The Incondicionales accepted whatever Spain had for Puerto Rico and the Crown duly recognized their support by giving aristocratic titles to their party's leaders.

=== 20th century ===
==== 1900-1940 ====
The Partido Republicano Puertorriqueño won the elections in 1900 and again in 1902. The new government of Puerto Rico, organized under the Foraker Act of 1900, was a mixture of the British and the American system, somewhat similar to that established for the territory of Orleans after the Louisiana Purchase. The House of Delegates was elected directly by the voters (male, propertied) and the equivalent to the Senate was the Cabinet appointed by the Governor and by the President of the United States. Muñoz-Rivera exiled himself to New York after the defeat, but returned once the Federal Party was no longer useful and joined Rosendo Matienzo Cintrón in organizing the Union Party, also with them was José de Diego.

Matienzo Cintrón had been a Republican, supporting statehood. But two years into the new government, he realized that statehood would not be granted and the desired equality as citizens was not feasible under the United States. He brought with him other former Republicans and practically all of Muñoz-Rivera's Federalists into a party that was to bring about the union of all political groups. He was successful, they won the elections of 1904 and all subsequent elections until the 1920s when another defection of Republicans allowed for the creation of yet another party bringing into it persons supporting a status change.

The Union Party, initially supported statehood or an autonomous government, it then later added independence. In fact, Matienzo-Cintrón went from statehood advocate to autonomist to independence advocate as a result of eight years of American civil government in Puerto Rico. The Union Party, from the very beginning, was against the colonial government established under the Foraker Act. Rosendo Matienzo Cintrón, Manuel Zeno Gandía, Luis Lloréns Torres, Eugenio Benítez Castaño, and Pedro Franceschi started to organize the Independence Party in 1912, which paved the path for similar movements. The Union Party quickly gained the attention of the colonial governors, all Republicans, who were willing to work closely with them because of their control of the House of Delegates. The local Republicans protested bitterly and, at one point, they took statehood out of their platform – not reinstating it until the early 1920s. Many in the Union Party leadership were lawyers who had contracts with the sugar operations recently bought out and enlarged by the new American owners, thus establishing a close relationship between the nascent middle classes and the American corporate interests.

A coalition between the pro-independence Union Party presided by Antonio R. Barceló and the pro-statehood Partido Republicano Puertorriqueño presided by José Tous Soto called the "Alianza Puertorriqueña" was formed. Differences between Barceló and Tous Soto and Félix Córdova Dávila, the resident commissioner of Puerto Rico in Washington, as to the goals of the alliance became apparent. The Unionist sector of the alliance decided to disaffiliate themselves from the "Alliance." Because of legal reasons, Barceló was unable to use the name "Union Party" and in 1932, founded the "Liberal Party of Puerto Rico". The Liberal Party's political agenda was the same as the original Union Party's agenda and urged independence as a final political solution for Puerto Rico. After the Liberal Party was defeated in the 1936 elections, an assembly was held in Naranjales on May 31, 1937, in which Luis Muñoz Marín presented his ideas as to how the party should be run, however, the majority of the party members objected and blamed him for their defeat. Muñoz Marín considered this action the same as having been expelled from the party. Muñoz Marín and his followers, among which were included Felisa Rincon de Gautier and Ernesto Ramos Antonini, held an assembly in the town of Arecibo founded the Partido Liberal, Neto, Auténtico y Completo ("Clear, Authentic and Complete Liberal Party"), claiming to be the true Liberal Party. The Partido Liberal, Neto, Auténtico y Completo, an independent political party, later became the Popular Democratic Party (PPD) which would ironically end up promoting the "Estado Libre Associado" (Free Associated State) status that Barceló, as president of Union Party, had asked for in 1923 under Campbell Bill and which Muñoz Marín had always opposed, instead of independence.

The Puerto Rican Nationalist Party was founded in 1922. It strongly criticized the American colonial regime for its menace to the Spanish and Latin American roots of the Puerto Rican culture. It also advocated for complete independence. The PNP began to grow with the leadership of Dr. Pedro Albizu Campos, who was later jailed by the colonial regime under charges as a subversive leader. On March 21, 1937, a peaceful march was organized in the southern city of Ponce by the nationalists after receiving authorization from the pertinent authorities. The march was organized to commemorate the abolition of slavery and to demand the release of Albizu Campos from federal prison. The permit, however, was revoked by the U.S.-appointed governor of the Island Blanton Winship minutes before the march was to start. The march turned into a bloody event when the Insular Police ("a force somewhat resembling the National Guard of the typical U.S. state" and which answered to governor Winship) opened fire upon, what a U.S. Congressman and others reported were unarmed and defenseless cadets and bystanders alike killing 19 and badly wounding over 200 more, many in their backs while running away. It came to be known as the Ponce massacre.

==== 1940–1968 ====
Luis Muñoz Marín founded the Popular Democratic Party (PPD) in 1938. Their slogan was Pan, Tierra y Libertad (Bread, Land and Liberty). The party favored independence from the United States in its initial stages but social and economic reform were priorities in their political agenda.

The Puerto Rican Independence Party was formed six years later by dissidents who saw the PPD moving away from the ideal of independence. During that period, the colonial regime appointed the first Puerto Rican governor, Jesús T. Piñero, until 1948 when the people elected Luis Muñoz Marín, the first elected governor.

The years of 1944–1948 were crucial ones in the direction of the country. Luis Muñoz Marín shifted his goals from independence to state-like autonomy to accommodate better economic circumstances. This led to the U.S. Congress to enact the Public Law 81-600 which led to the Congressional approval of a local constitution drafted by a constitutional assembly elected by Puerto Rico and the renaming of the United States unincorporated territory of Puerto Rico as the Commonwealth of Puerto Rico, using the same official name as the commonwealths of the U.S. states of Kentucky, Massachusetts, Pennsylvania and Virginia, as well as that of other sovereign nation countries such as Australia. The alternative pro-independence Tydings bill had languished in Congress.

In the 1950s, the Puerto Rican Nationalist Party denounced the Constitution and Muñoz Marín support as a sham, and staged a series of uprisings in 1950, known as the Puerto Rican Nationalist Party Revolts of the 1950s, of which the most notable were the ones in Jayuya, Utuado and San Juan, plus the attack on Blair House, and the United States House of Representatives in 1954. Twenty-three people were killed and more than 50 were injured.

Governor Muñoz Marín inaugurated the new status called Estado Libre Asociado—or Free Associated State in English—and raised the Puerto Rican flag along with La Borinqueña, the official anthem of Puerto Rico, for the first time on July 25, 1952—date in which Puerto Ricans celebrate the Constitution of Puerto Rico.

==== 1968–1999 ====
The New Progressive Party (PNP) was founded in August 1967 by Luis A. Ferré, a month after the July 23, 1967, local plebiscite and the year before the PNP won the 1968 elections. The party saw the ideology of annexation as a U.S. state as a civil rights issue. The creation of the New Progressive Party polarized the political arena to a great degree as radical independence groups were formed in the 1970s and the Puerto Rican Socialist Party (PSP), a Marxist and Cuba-friendly party, was created. Two of the radical groups were labeled as terrorist groups by the U.S. Government, Los Macheteros and the Armed Forces of National Liberation (FALN). These groups were viewed by many pro-independence followers as freedom fighters.

In 1972, the PNP lost to a reunified Popular Democratic Party (PPD). Rafael Hernández Colón became the undisputed leader of the PPD at age 36. He was, as the fourth elected governor, in favor of adding more powers to the commonwealth status. One of his projects was the Puerto Rican owned marine transportation. In order to control the costs of marine transport in Puerto Rico, the marine company Sea Land was bought to form Navieras of Puerto Rico in 1974.

The fifth governor was Carlos Romero Barceló, a supporter of annexation as the U.S. state of Puerto Rico. Under his administration, Section 936 of the U.S. Internal Revenue Tax Code (26 U.S.C. § 936) was implemented as an economic incentive. This allowed American companies to profit in the island without paying taxes. His administration was shadowed by the Cerro Maravilla (Maravilla Hill) affair, where two independence activists were killed by police agents. This created a Watergate-like scandal that was later investigated by the Senate.

In 1980, Romero Barcelo was reelected Governor by a controversial 0.2% margin, but lost control of the Senate and, a year later, the House of Representatives to the PPD. Independence radical groups placed bombs on 11 jet fighters in 1981 in the Muñiz Base (a U.S. military base), and the U.S. removed all of its fighter aircraft from Puerto Rico. Rafael Hernández Colón became the head of government for the second time in 1984, was reelected in 1988 and remained in power until 1992.

Pedro Rosselló became the sixth elected Governor in 1992. He pushed the political status dilemma in Washington, D.C., and sponsored two local non-binding referendums, one in 1993 and another in 1998. While he was elected to a second term, his last four years were met with mounting allegations of corruption. After Rosselló's second term ended, former Speaker of the House Edison Misla Aldarondo (PNP) was jailed as well as many members of Rosselló's party. Most of the corruption allegations were based on extortion and appropriation of public funds.

=== 21st century ===
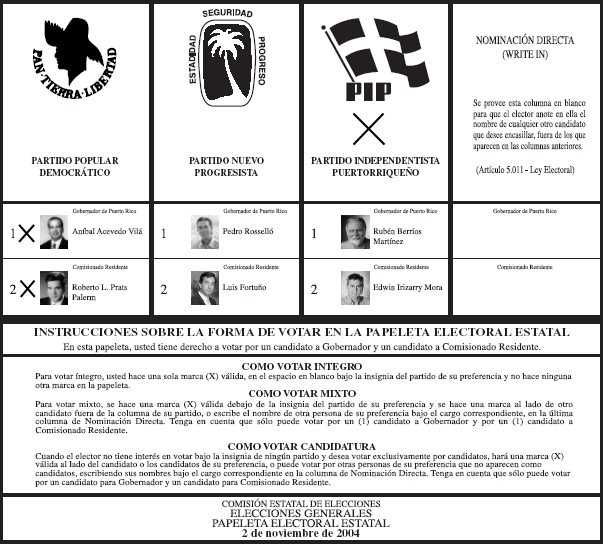
A sample ballot for the 2004 elections

==== 2000s ====
The corruption led the PNP to lose the 2000 election and the Governorship when he ran again in 2004. In 2000, Sila María Calderón (PPD) was elected, becoming the first female governor of Puerto Rico, also gaining control of the Senate, presided over by Antonio Fas Alzamora and the House of Representatives, headed by Speaker Carlos Vizcarrondo. The PPD also elected Aníbal Acevedo Vilá as the island's non-voting delegate in Congress.

In 2004, Aníbal Acevedo Vilá (PPD) was declared the winner by the Supreme Court of Puerto Rico as governor by about 3,000 votes, but his party lost control of the Senate, which elected PNP Senator Kenneth McClintock as its president, and the House of Representatives, which chose the PNP's José Aponte as Speaker, and Puerto Rico's seat in Congress, due to the election of Luis Fortuño.

During the 2005–2008 term, former Gov. Rosselló's unsuccessful attempt to unseat Senate President McClintock split the New Progressive Party, a split that continued as Rosselló initiated a fourth bid for the governorship against Resident Commissioner Fortuño in an internal primary that was held March 9, 2008, and which he lost. On the PPD side, Acevedo's rocky relationship with the PNP-controlled Legislature was compounded with Federal investigations and unsuccessful indictments of his past political fundraising by grand juries in Philadelphia and San Juan, Puerto Rico.

In 2008, Luis Fortuño (PNP) was elected governor, giving the New Progressive Party its largest victory in history and beating incumbent Gov. Aníbal Acevedo Vilá of the Popular Democratic Party (PPD) by more than 223,000 votes. Also the PNP won supermajorities in the Commonwealth's House of Representatives and Senate.

==== 2010s ====
Hillary Clinton Bernie Sanders No votes Results for the 2016 Democratic Party presidential primaries by municipality. Voters in Puerto Rico can vote in presidential primaries for the United States. Voters can also select a candidate in the presidential election, but these votes are not counted in the election.

The PNP won the seat for Puerto Rico's sole delegate to Congress, because of the election of Pedro Pierluisi. Alejandro García Padilla (PPD) was elected as the eleventh Governor of Puerto Rico, by a narrow (0.6%) margin, defeating Fortuño 47.73% to 47.13% in the 2012 gubernatorial elections. On November 8, 2016, Ricardo Rosselló, the son of former governor Pedro Rosselló (PNP) received 41% of the vote defeating five other gubernatorial candidates and was elected the twelfth Governor of Puerto Rico. He was sworn in on January 2, 2017. He resigned in 2019 after mass protest as a result of the Telegramgate.

==== 2020s ====
In the 2020 elections Pedro Pierluisi (PNP) was elected governor with 33% of the vote. The elections marked the first time third-party candidates other than Puerto Rican Independence Party won seats. In the 2020 elections the Popular Democratic Party took a slight majority of the seats in the Puerto Rico House of Representatives.

In April 2023, Puerto Rico's Status Act, which seeks to resolve its territorial status and relationship with the United States through a binding plebiscite at the federal level, was reintroduced in the House by Democrats.

In 2020 and 2024 there were referendums on Statehood, in both cases a majority of favored Statehood.

== Political status ==
In 1950, the U.S. Congress gave Puerto Ricans the right to organize a constitutional convention, contingent on the results of a referendum, where the electorate would determine if they wished to organize their own government pursuant to a constitution of their own choosing. Puerto Ricans expressed their support for this measure in a 1951 referendum, which gave voters a yes-or-no choice for the commonwealth status, defined as a 'permanent association with a federal union' but not choice for independence or statehood. A second referendum was held to ratify the constitution, which was adopted in 1952.

Before approving the new constitution, the Constitutional Convention specified the name by which the body politic would be known. On February 4, 1952, the convention approved Resolution 22 which chose in English the word "Commonwealth", meaning a "politically organized community" or "state", which is simultaneously connected by a compact or treaty to another political system. The convention adopted a translation into Spanish of the term, inspired by the Irish saorstát (Free State) of "Estado Libre Asociado" (ELA) to represent the agreement adopted "in the nature of a compact" between the people of Puerto Rico and the U.S. literally translated into English, the phrase means "Associated Free State."

In 1967, the Legislative Assembly tested the political interests of the Puerto Rican people by passing a plebiscite Act that allowed a vote on the status of Puerto Rico. This constituted the first plebiscite by the Legislature for a choice on three political status options. Puerto Rican leaders had lobbied for such an opportunity repeatedly, in 1898, 1912, 1914, 1919, 1923, 1929, 1932, 1939, 1943, 1944, 1948, 1956, and 1960. The Commonwealth option, represented by the PPD, won with an overwhelming majority of 60.4% of the votes. The Partido Republicano Puertorriqueño and the Puerto Rican Independence Party boycotted the plebiscite.

After the plebiscite, efforts in the 1970s to enact legislation to address the status issue died in Congressional committees. In the 1993 plebiscite, in which Congress played a more substantial role, Commonwealth status was again upheld. In the 1998 plebiscite, all the options were rejected when 50.3% of voters chose the "none of the above" option, favoring the commonwealth status quo by default.

=== International status ===
On November 27, 1953, shortly after the establishment of the Commonwealth, the General Assembly of the United Nations approved Resolution 748, removing Puerto Rico's classification as a non-self-governing territory under article 73(e) of the UN Charter. This made it possible for the United States to stop publicly transmitting information on Puerto Rico. However, as was pointed out by delegates from countries such as Indonesia and Guatemala during the discussions over the vote, the General Assembly did not apply its full list of "factors" to Puerto Rico to determine if it had achieved self-governing status. These and other delegates argued that Puerto Rico had not attained fully self-governing status.

In August 1977, the Chairman of the Democratic Party of Puerto Rico, Franklin Delano López, testified before the UN Decolonization Committee denouncing the colonial nature of the Commonwealth Status. As a result of his statement, many other statehooders and commonwealth supporters went to the United Nations requesting the end of the colonial status.

=== Political status within the United States ===
Under the Constitution of Puerto Rico, Puerto Rico is described as a Commonwealth and Puerto Ricans have a degree of administrative autonomy similar to that of a U.S. state. Puerto Ricans were collectively made U.S. citizens in 1917 as a result of the Jones–Shafroth Act. The act was signed into law by President Woodrow Wilson on March 2, 1917. U.S. Federal law 8 U.S.C. § 1402 approved by the President Harry S. Truman on June 27, 1952, declared all persons born in Puerto Rico on or after January 13, 1941, to be citizens of the U.S. at birth and all persons born in Puerto Rico between April 11, 1899, and January 12, 1941, and meeting certain other technical requirements, and not citizens of the United States under any other Act, were declared to be citizens of the U.S. as of January 13, 1941.

Only the "fundamental rights" under the federal constitution apply to Puerto Rico like the Privileges and Immunities Clause (U.S. Constitution, Article IV, Section 2, Clause 1, also known as the 'Comity Clause') that prevents a state from treating citizens of other states in a discriminatory manner, with regard to basic civil rights. The clause also embraces a right to travel, so that a citizen of one state can go and enjoy privileges and immunities in any other state; this constitutional clause was expressly extended to Puerto Rico by the U.S. Congress through the federal law 48 U.S.C. § 737 and signed by the President Harry S. Truman in 1947. Other fundamental rights like the Due Process Clause and the equal protection guarantee of the Fourteenth Amendment was expressly extended to Puerto Rico by the U.S. Supreme Court. In a brief concurrence in the judgment of Torres v. Puerto Rico, U.S. Supreme Court Justice Brennan, argued that any implicit limits from the Insular Cases on the basic rights granted by the Constitution (including especially the Bill of Rights) were anachronistic in the 1970s.

President George H. W. Bush issued a memorandum on November 30, 1992, to heads of executive departments and agencies establishing the current administrative relationship between the federal government and the Commonwealth of Puerto Rico. This memorandum directs all federal departments, agencies, and officials to treat Puerto Rico administratively as if it were a state, insofar as doing so would not disrupt federal programs or operations.

Puerto Rico does participate in the internal political process of both the Democratic and Republican parties in the U.S., accorded equal-proportional representation in both parties, and delegates from the islands vote in each party's national presidential convention.

Puerto Ricans may enlist in the U.S. military. Since 1917, Puerto Ricans have been included in the compulsory draft whenever it has been in effect and more than 400,000 Puerto Ricans have served in the United States Armed Forces. Puerto Ricans have participated in all U.S. wars since 1898, most notably World War I, World War II, the Korean and Vietnam wars, as well as the current Middle Eastern conflicts. Several Puerto Ricans became notable commanders, five have been awarded the Medal of Honor, the highest military decoration in the United States, also several Puerto Ricans have attained the rank of General or Admiral, which requires a Presidential nomination and Senate confirmation. In World War II, the Korean War and the Vietnam War Puerto Ricans were the most decorated Hispanic soldiers and in some cases they were the first to die in combat.

Puerto Rico has not yet become an independent nation or a state of the Union. It remains a territory of the United States of America. The action of Congress in authorizing and approving, The Commonwealth Constitution is adopted pursuant to the constitutional power of Congress to make necessary rules and regulations concerning the territory of the United States of America. The foreign relations of Puerto Rico, like those of other territories and states, continue to be conducted by the United States of America. Internal government and administration, Puerto Rico occupies a unique position among the territories and states of the United States of America. in requesting Congress to authorize the drafting and adoption of a constitution. Congress has agreed that Puerto Rico shall, under this constitution, be free from any control or interference by Congress in matters relating to internal government and administration, subject only to compliance with the applicable provisions of the federal constitution of the United States of America. Laws that directed or authorized direct interference by the United States federal government in local government affairs, prior to 1952, have been repealed.

=== Implications of the current political status ===
Puerto Rico is an organized unincorporated U.S. territory which has been given internal self-governing powers (Note: The number and breadth of these "internal self-governing powers" is a matter of debate) which, taken together, are referred to as "Commonwealth" status. Puerto Rico has more latitude over its internal affairs than the U.S. territories of Guam, the U.S. Virgin Islands, or American Samoa.

Puerto Rico has approximately the same degree of authority over its internal affairs as an American state. However, it does not have the sovereignty that a state of the Union has, given that Puerto Rico is a possession of the United States and it is, thus, not protected by the US Constitution to the same degree that states are.

Some differences between Puerto Rico and a state of the American Union are:

- "Unlike states, and federally-recognized Native American reservations, Puerto Rico does not have a zone of reserved sovereignty that is beyond the reach of Congress in the latter's exercise of its territorial powers." That is, Puerto Rico has no recourse to challenge unilateral actions by the United States government that affect citizens of Puerto Rico.
- Some residents of Puerto Rico are exempt from some aspects of the Internal Revenue Code.
- Puerto Rico has international representation in sports and some other culturally international events, similar to sovereign nations.
- Puerto Rico does not have the rights of a state as granted by the US constitution, because it is not a state. These include:
  - Lack of voting representation in either House of the U.S. Congress.
  - Puerto Rico residents cannot vote in presidential elections.

Despite the fact that the U.S. Federal Government holds ultimate sovereignty over all U.S. citizens and the territory of Puerto Rico, residents of Puerto Rico are without an effective voice in the Federal government. This is not because Puerto Rico residents do not have the right to vote, but rather because the territory itself does not have voting representation in the United States Congress, nor is it represented in the United States Electoral College. Puerto Ricans do, however, play an indirect role in electing the President of the United States, since both the Republican Party and the Democratic Party hold primaries in Puerto Rico, giving Puerto Ricans a voice selecting each party's presidential nominee.

Both the Puerto Rican Independence Party and the New Progressive Party outright reject the status quo that permits disfranchisement. The remaining political organization, the Popular Democratic Party, is less active in its opposition of this case of disfranchisement but has officially stated that it favors fixing the remaining "deficits of democracy" that the Bill Clinton and George W. Bush Administrations have publicly recognized in writing through Presidential Task Force Reports.

=== Presidential politics in Puerto Rico ===
Although the Republican Party and Democratic Party chapters in Puerto Rico have selected voting delegates to the national nominating conventions since the early 1900s, public interest in these processes heightened as a result of the efforts of a group of Democratic statehooders led by Franklin Delano López in 1976 to elect delegates supporting former Georgia Gov. Jimmy Carter to that year's Democratic National Convention. On October 23, 1979, the first primary of a party affiliated to the Democratic National Committee was held in Puerto Rico. Franklin Delano López was elected Chairman of the New Democratic Party of Puerto Rico by the direct votes of 374,000 American citizens residing on the Island. Lopez then moved the Puerto Rican Legislature to adopt a Presidential Primary Law. During the discussion of the Presidential primary Law, Lopez managed to persuade Presidential Chief of Staff, Hamilton Jordan and Timothy Kraft to grant Puerto Rico the right for a more robust delegation, the inclusion of Puerto Rico after Pennsylvania in the roll call of the state in exchange of eliminating from the bill that Puerto Rico was going to be the first Presidential Primary in the Nation. As a result of that effort, the Puerto Rico Legislature approved a law regulating presidential primaries in 1979, the first of which was held in 1980, with George H. W. Bush winning the Republican primary and President Carter beating Senator Edward "Ted" Kennedy in a hard-fought Democratic primary. More than 1.2 million American citizens residing in Puerto Rico participated in the primaries.

In the first internal primary of a National political party, the new slate of statehooders, headed by Franklin Delano López took control of the local Democratic party chapter. In January 1980 after clashing with Governor Carlos Romero Barceló, Lopez was forced to resign the chairmanship of the New Democratic Party in exchange of the Governor becoming the President of Carter's campaign in Puerto Rico and throwing the New Progressive Party behind the president's re-election efforts. Lopez' fight with Governor Romero, on behalf of President Carter, paid off and was appointed Deputy Campaign Manager of President Carter national campaign. Lopez efforts moved to Puerto Rico and the status issue at the forefront of the National political discussion. Subsequently, both the statehood faction and the commonwealth shared control on a 50-50 basis from 1984 to 1988 and lost control that year as a result of their defeat in an internal primary that year between PPD forces led by then Senate president Miguel Hernández Agosto and PNP forces led by former Gov. Carlos Romero Barceló. While the PPD Democratic faction controls the Democratic party chapter under the state chairmanship of former senator Roberto Prats, two of the five DNC members residing in Puerto Rico, Senate president Kenneth McClintock and Francisco Domenech are statehooders.

On the Republican side PNP-affiliated statehood Republicans control the GOP local chapter (Republican Party of Puerto Rico), headed by state chair and Aguadilla mayor Carlos Méndez, Republican National Committeeman and Governor Luis Fortuño and Republican National Committeewoman Zoraida Fonalledas.

The 2008 Republican presidential primary was slated to be held in February, while Democrats held their primary in June. Then Senate President and Democratic National Committeeman Kenneth McClintock, former Sen. Roberto Prats, Puerto Rico's Democratic State Chair and former PPD gubernatorial candidate José Alfredo Hernández Mayoral were appointed co-chairs of Sen. Hillary Clinton's National Hispanic Leadership Council while Young Democrats of America Democratic National Committeeman Francisco Domenech co-chaired Clinton's young professionals organization. Prats and McClintock subsequently co-chaired Clinton's Puerto Rico campaign, while Francisco Domenech became the Deputy Campaign Manager. Senator Clinton won the Puerto Rico Primary by a 68% to 32% margin. Being the last big primary before the last two states voted on June 3, Puerto Rico's Democratic presidential primary attracted historic levels of national media coverage.

Several local politicians have expressed concern that Puerto Rico has become a "piggy bank" for presidential campaigns. Recent examples include Vice President Dick Cheney's whirlwind two-hour visit to collect $300,000 in 2006 and Senator Barack Obama's 50% longer three-hour trip in November, 2007 to collect $200,000

Speculation, which began in late 2009 by a national media blog and by Grover Norquist, a well-known Republican commentator, mentioned Gov. Fortuño as a long-shot inclusion in a national political ticket.

=== 21st Century ===
According to a December 2005 report by the President's Task Force on Puerto Rico's Status, it is not possible "to bind future (U.S.) Congresses to any particular arrangement for Puerto Rico as a Commonwealth". This determination was based on articles in the U.S. Constitution regarding territories. Prominent leaders in the pro-statehood and pro-independence political movements agree with this assessment. In 2005 and 2007, two reports were issued by the U.S. President's Task Force on Puerto Rico's Status. Both reports conclude that Puerto Rico continues to be a territory of U.S. under the plenary powers of the U.S. Congress. Reactions from Puerto Rico's two major political parties were mixed. The Popular Democratic Party (PPD) challenged the task force's report and committed to validating the current status in all international forums, including the United Nations. It also rejects any "colonial or territorial status" as a status option, and vows to keep working for the enhanced Commonwealth status that was approved by the PPD in 1998 which included sovereignty, an association based on "respect and dignity between both nations", and common citizenship. The New Progressive Party (PNP) supported the White House Report's conclusions and supported bills to provide for a democratic referendum process among Puerto Rico voters. It stated that the U.S. Justice Department in 1959 reiterated that Congress held power over Puerto Rico pursuant to the Territorial Clause of the U.S. Constitution. In a 1996 report on a Puerto Rico status political bill, the "U.S. House Committee on Resources stated that PR's current status does not meet the criteria for any of the options for full self-government". It concluded that Puerto Rico is still an unincorporated territory of the U.S. under the territorial clause, that the establishment of local self-government with the consent of the people can be unilaterally revoked by the U.S. Congress, and that U.S. Congress can also withdraw the U.S. citizenship of Puerto Rican residents of Puerto Rico at any time, for a legitimate Federal purpose. The application of the Constitution to Puerto Rico is limited by the Insular Cases.

On December 21, 2007, the Bush Administration's Task Force on Puerto Rico's Status reiterated and confirmed that Puerto Rico continues to be a territory of the U.S. under the plenary powers of the U.S. Congress, a position shared by the remaining two-major parties: New Progressive Party and the Puerto Rican Independence Party.

On June 15, 2009, the United Nations Special Committee on Decolonization approved a draft resolution calling on the Government of the United States to expedite a process that would allow the Puerto Rican people to exercise fully their inalienable right to self-determination and independence.

Following the reports recommendations the 2009 bill (H.R. 2499), was introduced in the United States House of Representatives on May 19, 2009, by Pedro Pierluisi (D-Puerto Rico). The bill would have provided for a referendum giving Puerto Ricans the choice between the options of retaining their present political status, or choosing a new status. If the former option won, the referendum would have been held again every 8 years. If the latter option won, a separate referendum would be held where Puerto Ricans would have been given the option of being admitted as a US State "on equal footing with the other states", or becoming a "sovereign nation, either fully independent from or in free association with the United States." The bill enjoyed bi-partisan support in the House of Representatives, with 182 co-sponsors and was reported out of the House Resources Committee on a 30–8 vote. The measure was passed by the House on April 29, 2010. The bill did not pass in the Senate.

On March 16, 2011, the President's Task Force on Puerto Rico's Status issued a third report that reaffirmed the legal position adopted by the three previous presidents over nearly a quarter century that Puerto Rico remains today "subject to the Territory Clause of the U.S. Constitution (see Report at p. 26), that the territory's long-term economic well-being would be enhanced by an early resolution of the political status problem (p. 33) and devotes most of the report to extensive economic analysis and recommendations.

On December 11, 2012, the Legislative Assembly of Puerto Rico enacted a concurrent resolution to request the President and the Congress of the United States to respond diligently and effectively, and to act on the demand of the people of Puerto Rico, as freely and democratically expressed in the plebiscite held on November 6, 2012, to end, once and for all, its current form of territorial status and to begin the process to admit Puerto Rico to the Union as a State.

On May 15, 2013, headed by non-voting Resident Commissioner Pedro Pierluisi, a group of 119 Democratic and 12 Republican members of Congress introduced H.R. 2000, the Puerto Rico Status Resolution Act to Congress, requesting a process for voting to admit Puerto Rico as a State to be approved and a vote to ratify Puerto Rico as a state. It did not receive a vote in the House.

The nature of Puerto Rico's political relationship with the United States is the subject of ongoing debate in the United Nations and the International Community. According to two consecutive Bush Administration President's Task Force Reports, the latest of which was issued on December 21, 2007 Puerto Rico is an unincorporated organized territory of the United States, subject to the plenary powers of the United States government. The Popular Democratic Party has challenged the Bush Administration's Task Force Reports stating that in 1953 Puerto Rico achieved a compact of association between both nations that was recognized by the United Nations. Nonetheless, the aforementioned U.S. Presidential and Congressional Reports state that the current prerogatives assumed by the Puerto Rico government are delegated by the U.S. Congress and may be amended or eliminated at its sole behest.

In a letter sent by the former governor of Puerto Rico to the former U.S. Secretary of State, Condoleezza Rice and the Co-Chairs of the White House's Presidential Task Force on Puerto Rico's Status on the Bush administration, former governor Acevedo Vilá stated:

"My Administration's position is very clear: if the Task Force and the Bush Administration stand by their 2005 conclusions, then for over 50 years the U.S Government has perpetuated a 'monumental hoax' on the people of Puerto Rico, on the people of the United States and on the international community. If the 2005 report articulates the new official position of the United States, the time has come now for the State Department to formally notify the United Nations of this new position and assume the international legal consequences. You cannot have a legal and constitutional interpretation for local, political purposes and a different one for the international community. If it is a serious, relevant document, the report must have international consequences. Alternatively, the Task Force may review and amend the 2005 conclusions to make them consistent with legal and historical precedent, and therefore allow future status developments based on a binding compact."

On December 15, 2022, the U.S. House of Representatives voted in favor of the Puerto Rico Status Act. The act sought to resolve Puerto Rico's status and its relationship to the United States through a binding plebiscite.

In September 2023, Roger Wicker reintroduced legislation in the United States Congress on the territorial status of Puerto Rico. a two-round consultation process. The first vote is scheduled for August 4, 2024, where Puerto Ricans will have the choice between four alternatives: annexation to the United States, independence, sovereignty in free association, and a free state associated with the United States.

In July 2024, Governor Pedro Pierluisi calls a plebiscite on the status of Puerto Rico in November 2024. For the first time, the island's current status as a U.S. territory will not be an option during the non-binding plebiscite. The executive order follows the U.S. House of Representatives' approval in 2022 of a bill to help Puerto Rico move toward a change in territorial status. Voters have a choice between statehood, independence, or independence with free association, the terms of which would be negotiated regarding foreign affairs, U.S. citizenship, and use of the U.S. dollar. There were three choices: statehood, independence, and independence with free association with the United States (There was no option to maintain status). The top choice was 57% voted for Statehood (as part of the USA) from 528 thousand votes.

On February 13, 2025, the Puerto Rico House of Representatives approved a resolution on the legal territorial status of Puerto Rico. "Concurrent Senate Resolution 0001 requests that 'the President and Congress of the United States of America respond promptly and act in accordance with the demands of the citizens of Puerto Rico.'"

== See also ==
- List of political parties in Puerto Rico
- Political party strength in Puerto Rico
- Elections in Puerto Rico
- Municipalities of Puerto Rico
- Puerto Rico political status plebiscites
- Holidays in Puerto Rico
