= Political party strength in Puerto Rico =

Political parties in the US territory

The political party strength in Puerto Rico has been held by different political parties in the history of Puerto Rico. Today, that strength is primarily held by two parties, namely:

- The New Progressive Party (PNP in Spanish) which holds about 39% of the popular vote while advocating for Puerto Rico to become a state of the United States
- The Popular Democratic Party (PPD in Spanish) which holds about 34% of the popular vote while advocating for maintaining the current political status of Puerto Rico as that of a Commonwealth (Note: Party platform 2012 (in Spanish) p. 248. "El Partido Popular Democrático reafirma que el Estado Libre Asociado es la opción de estatus que mejor representa las aspiraciones del Pueblo de Puerto Rico.") (Note: Party platform 2012 (in Spanish) p. 248 "El Partido Popular Democrático apoya firmemente el desarrollo del Estado Libre Asociado hasta el máximo de autonomía compatible con los principios de unión permanente con los Estados Unidos y la ciudadanía americana de los puertorriqueños. El Partido Popular rechaza cualquier modificación de estatus que se aparte de estos principios y que atente contra nuestra nacionalidad puertorriqueña o que menoscabe nuestra identidad lingüística y cultural.")

Political party strength in Puerto Rico in 2020

The rest of the strength is held by three minority parties:

- The Movimiento Victoria Ciudadana (MVC) which holds about 12% of the popular vote while advocating for a constitutional assembly and running on an anti-colonial platform
- The Puerto Rican Independence Party (PIP in Spanish) which holds about 6% of the popular vote while advocating for the independence of Puerto Rico
- Project Dignity (PD) which holds about 6% of the popular vote while advocating for a Christian and conservative platform

== Before the 1952 Constitution ==
The following table indicates the party of elected officials in the United States insular area of Puerto Rico after 1898:

- Governor

The table also indicates the historical party composition in the territorial or Commonwealth:

- Senate
- House of Representatives
- Territory delegation to the U.S. House of Representatives

The Puerto Rican parties are as follows:

Acción Cristiana (AC), Alianza Puertorriqueña (AP), Coalición *(C), Estadista (E), Estadista Puertorriqueño (EP), Estadista Republicano (ER), Puerto Rican Independence (PIP), Liberal (L), Movimiento Unión Soberanista (MUS), Nonpartisan (NP), New Progressive Party (PNP), Popular Democratic Party (PPD), People's Party (P), Working People's Party (PT/PPT), Puertorriqueños por Puerto Rico (PPR), Republicano Puertorriqueño (RP), Socialista Obrero (SO), Socialist (PSP), Unionist (U), and Unión Republicana Progresista (URP).
*Coalición was an electoral coalition, not a party.

For a particular year, the noted partisan composition is that which either took office during that year or which maintained the office throughout the entire year. Only changes made outside of regularly scheduled elections are noted as affecting the partisan composition during a particular year. Shading is determined by the final result of any mid-cycle changes in partisan affiliation.

Year	Executive office	Legislative Assembly		U.S. House
Year	Governor	Senate	House	U.S. House
1901	appointed under United States colonial administration		unknown	Federico Degetau (RP)
1902	appointed under United States colonial administration		unknown	Federico Degetau (RP)
1903	appointed under United States colonial administration		unknown	Federico Degetau (RP)
1904	appointed under United States colonial administration		unknown	Federico Degetau (RP)
1905	appointed under United States colonial administration		U majority	Tulio Larrínaga (U)
1906	appointed under United States colonial administration		U majority	Tulio Larrínaga (U)
1907	appointed under United States colonial administration		U majority	Tulio Larrínaga (U)
1908	appointed under United States colonial administration		U majority	Tulio Larrínaga (U)
1909	appointed under United States colonial administration		U majority	Tulio Larrínaga (U)
1910	appointed under United States colonial administration		U majority	Tulio Larrínaga (U)
1911	appointed under United States colonial administration		U majority	Luis Muñoz Rivera (U)
1912	appointed under United States colonial administration		U majority	Luis Muñoz Rivera (U)
1913	appointed under United States colonial administration		U majority	Luis Muñoz Rivera (U)
1914	appointed under United States colonial administration		U majority	Luis Muñoz Rivera (U)
1915	appointed under United States colonial administration		U majority	Luis Muñoz Rivera (U)
1916	appointed under United States colonial administration		U majority	Luis Muñoz Rivera (U)
1917	appointed under United States colonial administration	13U, 5RP, 1S	unknown	Félix Córdova Dávila (U)
1918	appointed under United States colonial administration	13U, 5RP, 1S	unknown	Félix Córdova Dávila (U)
1919	appointed under United States colonial administration	13U, 5RP, 1S	unknown	Félix Córdova Dávila (U)
1920	appointed under United States colonial administration	13U, 5RP, 1S	unknown	Félix Córdova Dávila (U)
1921	appointed under United States colonial administration	15U, 3RP, 1S	unknown	Félix Córdova Dávila (U)
1922	appointed under United States colonial administration	15U, 3RP, 1S	unknown	Félix Córdova Dávila (U)
1923	appointed under United States colonial administration	15U, 3RP, 1S	unknown	Félix Córdova Dávila (U)
1924	appointed under United States colonial administration	15U, 3RP, 1S	unknown	Félix Córdova Dávila (U)
1925	appointed under United States colonial administration	17AP, 2U	unknown	Félix Córdova Dávila (U)
1926	appointed under United States colonial administration	17AP, 2U	unknown	Félix Córdova Dávila (U)
1927	appointed under United States colonial administration	17AP, 2U	unknown	Félix Córdova Dávila (U)
1928	appointed under United States colonial administration	17AP, 2U	unknown	Félix Córdova Dávila (U)
1929	appointed under United States colonial administration	11AP, 7SC, 1PH	unknown	Félix Córdova Dávila (U)
1930	appointed under United States colonial administration	11AP, 7SC, 1PH	unknown	Félix Córdova Dávila (U)
1931	appointed under United States colonial administration	11AP, 7SC, 1PH	unknown	Félix Córdova Dávila (U)
1932	appointed under United States colonial administration	11AP, 7SC, 1PH	unknown	Félix Córdova Dávila (U)
1932	appointed under United States colonial administration	11AP, 7SC, 1PH	unknown	José Lorenzo Pesquera (NP)
1933	appointed under United States colonial administration	14C, 5L	C majority	Santiago Iglesias (C)
1934	appointed under United States colonial administration	14C, 5L	C majority	Santiago Iglesias (C)
1935	appointed under United States colonial administration	14C, 5L	C majority	Santiago Iglesias (C)
1936	appointed under United States colonial administration	14C, 5L	C majority	Santiago Iglesias (C)
1937	appointed under United States colonial administration	14C, 5L	C majority	Santiago Iglesias (C)
1938	appointed under United States colonial administration	14C, 5L	C majority	Santiago Iglesias (C)
1939	appointed under United States colonial administration	14C, 5L	C majority	Bolívar Pagán (C)
1940	appointed under United States colonial administration	14C, 5L	C majority	Bolívar Pagán (C)
1941	appointed under United States colonial administration	10PPD, 9U	PPD majority	Bolívar Pagán (C)
1942	appointed under United States colonial administration	10PPD, 9U	PPD majority	Bolívar Pagán (C)
1943	appointed under United States colonial administration	10PPD, 9U	PPD majority	Bolívar Pagán (C)
1944	appointed under United States colonial administration	10PPD, 9U	PPD majority	Bolívar Pagán (C)
1945	appointed under United States colonial administration	17PPD, 1URP, 1S	PPD majority	Jesús T. Piñero (PPD)
1946	appointed under United States colonial administration	17PPD, 1URP, 1S	PPD majority	Jesús T. Piñero (PPD)
1946	appointed under United States colonial administration	17PPD, 1URP, 1S	PPD majority	Antonio Fernós Isern (PPD)
1947	appointed under United States colonial administration	17PPD, 1URP, 1S	PPD majority	Antonio Fernós Isern (PPD)
1948	appointed under United States colonial administration	17PPD, 1URP, 1S	PPD majority	Antonio Fernós Isern (PPD)
1949	Luis Muñoz Marín (PPD)	17PPD, 1S, 1EP	PPD majority	Antonio Fernós Isern (PPD)
1950	Luis Muñoz Marín (PPD)	17PPD, 1S, 1EP	PPD majority	Antonio Fernós Isern (PPD)
1951	Luis Muñoz Marín (PPD)	17PPD, 1S, 1EP	PPD majority	Antonio Fernós Isern (PPD)
1952	Luis Muñoz Marín (PPD)	17PPD, 1S, 1EP	PPD majority	Antonio Fernós Isern (PPD)

== After the 1952 Constitution ==
Year	Governor	Legislative Assembly		United States Congress				Presidential Straw Poll
Year	Governor	Territorial Senate	Territorial House	Resident Commissioner	Shadow Senator	Shadow Senator	Shadow Representatives	
1953	Luis Muñoz Marín (PPD/I)	23 PPD, 5 PIP 4 PER (Note: Per Article III of the Puerto Rico Constitution, if a party wins a two-thirds majority (18 out of 27 seats) or more in the Senate, seats must be added to preserve minority parties' power, equal to the number of seats over the 18-seat threshold.)		Antonio Fernós Isern (PPD/D)	no such office			no such contest (Note: Presidential straw poll first conducted in 2024.)
1954	Luis Muñoz Marín (PPD/I)	23 PPD, 5 PIP 4 PER		Antonio Fernós Isern (PPD/D)	no such office			no such contest
1955	Luis Muñoz Marín (PPD/I)	23 PPD, 5 PIP 4 PER		Antonio Fernós Isern (PPD/D)	no such office			no such contest
1956	Luis Muñoz Marín (PPD/I)	23 PPD, 5 PIP 4 PER		Antonio Fernós Isern (PPD/D)	no such office			no such contest
1957	Luis Muñoz Marín (PPD/I)	23 PPD, 6 PER, 3 PIP		Antonio Fernós Isern (PPD/D)	no such office			no such contest
1958	Luis Muñoz Marín (PPD/I)	23 PPD, 6 PER, 3 PIP		Antonio Fernós Isern (PPD/D)	no such office			no such contest
1959	Luis Muñoz Marín (PPD/I)	23 PPD, 6 PER, 3 PIP		Antonio Fernós Isern (PPD/D)	no such office			no such contest
1960	Luis Muñoz Marín (PPD/I)	23 PPD, 6 PER, 3 PIP		Antonio Fernós Isern (PPD/D)	no such office			no such contest
1961	Luis Muñoz Marín (PPD/I)	23 PPD, 9 PER, 1 Ind		Antonio Fernós Isern (PPD/D)	no such office			no such contest
1962	Luis Muñoz Marín (PPD/I)	23 PPD, 9 PER, 1 Ind		Antonio Fernós Isern (PPD/D)	no such office			no such contest
1963	Luis Muñoz Marín (PPD/I)	23 PPD, 9 PER, 1 Ind		Antonio Fernós Isern (PPD/D)	no such office			no such contest
1964	Luis Muñoz Marín (PPD/I)	23 PPD, 9 PER, 1 Ind		Antonio Fernós Isern (PPD/D)	no such office			no such contest
1965	Roberto Sánchez Vilella (PPD/D)	23 PPD, 9 PER		Santiago Polanco-Abreu (PPD/D)	no such office			no such contest
1966	Roberto Sánchez Vilella (PPD/D)	23 PPD, 9 PER		Santiago Polanco-Abreu (PPD/D)	no such office			no such contest
1967	Roberto Sánchez Vilella (PPD/D)	23 PPD, 9 PER		Santiago Polanco-Abreu (PPD/D)	no such office			no such contest
1968	Roberto Sánchez Vilella (PPD/D)	23 PPD, 9 PER		Santiago Polanco-Abreu (PPD/D)	no such office			no such contest
1969	Luis A. Ferré (PNP/R)	17 PPD, 10 PNP	28 PNP, 23 PPD	Jorge Luis Córdova (PNP/D)	no such office			no such contest
1970	Luis A. Ferré (PNP/R)	17 PPD, 10 PNP	28 PNP, 23 PPD	Jorge Luis Córdova (PNP/D)	no such office			no such contest
1971	Luis A. Ferré (PNP/R)	17 PPD, 10 PNP	28 PNP, 23 PPD	Jorge Luis Córdova (PNP/D)	no such office			no such contest
1972	Luis A. Ferré (PNP/R)	17 PPD, 10 PNP	28 PNP, 23 PPD	Jorge Luis Córdova (PNP/D)	no such office			no such contest
1973	Rafael Hernández Colón (PPD/D)	20 PPD, 6 PNP, 1 PIP		Jaime Benítez Rexach (PPD/D)	no such office			no such contest
1974	Rafael Hernández Colón (PPD/D)	20 PPD, 6 PNP, 1 PIP		Jaime Benítez Rexach (PPD/D)	no such office			no such contest
1975	Rafael Hernández Colón (PPD/D)	20 PPD, 6 PNP, 1 PIP		Jaime Benítez Rexach (PPD/D)	no such office			no such contest
1976	Rafael Hernández Colón (PPD/D)	20 PPD, 6 PNP, 1 PIP		Jaime Benítez Rexach (PPD/D)	no such office			no such contest
1977	Carlos Romero Barceló (PNP/R)	14 PPD, 13 PNP		Baltasar Corrada del Río (PNP/D)	no such office			no such contest
1978	Carlos Romero Barceló (PNP/R)	14 PPD, 13 PNP		Baltasar Corrada del Río (PNP/D)	no such office			no such contest
1979	Carlos Romero Barceló (PNP/D)	14 PPD, 13 PNP		Baltasar Corrada del Río (PNP/D)	no such office			no such contest
1980	Carlos Romero Barceló (PNP/D)	14 PPD, 13 PNP		Baltasar Corrada del Río (PNP/D)	no such office			no such contest
1981	Carlos Romero Barceló (PNP/D)	15 PPD, 12 PNP	25 PPD, 25 PNP, 1 Ind	Baltasar Corrada del Río (PNP/D)	no such office			no such contest
1982	Carlos Romero Barceló (PNP/D)	15 PPD, 12 PNP	25 PPD, 25 PNP, 1 Ind	Baltasar Corrada del Río (PNP/D)	no such office			no such contest
1983	Carlos Romero Barceló (PNP/D)	15 PPD, 12 PNP	25 PPD, 25 PNP, 1 Ind	Baltasar Corrada del Río (PNP/D)	no such office			no such contest
1984	Carlos Romero Barceló (PNP/D)	15 PPD, 12 PNP	25 PPD, 25 PNP, 1 Ind	Baltasar Corrada del Río (PNP/D)	no such office			no such contest
1985	Rafael Hernández Colón (PPD/D)	18 PPD, 8 PNP, 1 PIP		Jaime Fuster (PPD/D)	no such office			no such contest
1986	Rafael Hernández Colón (PPD/D)	18 PPD, 8 PNP, 1 PIP		Jaime Fuster (PPD/D)	no such office			no such contest
1987	Rafael Hernández Colón (PPD/D)	18 PPD, 8 PNP, 1 PIP		Jaime Fuster (PPD/D)	no such office			no such contest
1988	Rafael Hernández Colón (PPD/D)	18 PPD, 8 PNP, 1 PIP		Jaime Fuster (PPD/D)	no such office			no such contest
1989	Rafael Hernández Colón (PPD/D)	18 PPD, 8 PNP, 1 PIP		Jaime Fuster (PPD/D)	no such office			no such contest
1990	Rafael Hernández Colón (PPD/D)	18 PPD, 8 PNP, 1 PIP		Jaime Fuster (PPD/D)	no such office			no such contest
1991	Rafael Hernández Colón (PPD/D)	18 PPD, 8 PNP, 1 PIP		Jaime Fuster (PPD/D)	no such office			no such contest
1992	Rafael Hernández Colón (PPD/D)	18 PPD, 8 PNP, 1 PIP		Antonio Colorado (PPD/D)	no such office			no such contest
1993	Pedro Rosselló (PNP/D)	21 PNP, 7 PPD, 1 PIP		Carlos Romero Barceló (PNP/D)	no such office			no such contest
1994	Pedro Rosselló (PNP/D)	21 PNP, 7 PPD, 1 PIP		Carlos Romero Barceló (PNP/D)	no such office			no such contest
1995	Pedro Rosselló (PNP/D)	21 PNP, 7 PPD, 1 PIP		Carlos Romero Barceló (PNP/D)	no such office			no such contest
1996	Pedro Rosselló (PNP/D)	21 PNP, 7 PPD, 1 PIP		Carlos Romero Barceló (PNP/D)	no such office			no such contest
1997	Pedro Rosselló (PNP/D)	19 PNP, 8 PPD, 1 PIP	37 PNP, 16 PPD, 1 PIP	Carlos Romero Barceló (PNP/D)	no such office			no such contest
1998	Pedro Rosselló (PNP/D)	19 PNP, 8 PPD, 1 PIP	37 PNP, 16 PPD, 1 PIP	Carlos Romero Barceló (PNP/D)	no such office			no such contest
1999	Pedro Rosselló (PNP/D)	19 PNP, 8 PPD, 1 PIP	37 PNP, 16 PPD, 1 PIP	Carlos Romero Barceló (PNP/D)	no such office			no such contest
2000	Pedro Rosselló (PNP/D)	19 PNP, 8 PPD, 1 PIP	37 PNP, 16 PPD, 1 PIP	Carlos Romero Barceló (PNP/D)	no such office			no such contest
2001	Sila María Calderón (PPD/D)	19 PPD, 8 PNP, 1 PIP	29 PPD, 21 PNP, 1 PIP	Aníbal Acevedo Vilá (PPD/D)	no such office			no such contest
2002	Sila María Calderón (PPD/D)	19 PPD, 8 PNP, 1 PIP	29 PPD, 21 PNP, 1 PIP	Aníbal Acevedo Vilá (PPD/D)	no such office			no such contest
2003	Sila María Calderón (PPD/D)	19 PPD, 8 PNP, 1 PIP	29 PPD, 21 PNP, 1 PIP	Aníbal Acevedo Vilá (PPD/D)	no such office			no such contest
2004	Sila María Calderón (PPD/D)	19 PPD, 8 PNP, 1 PIP	29 PPD, 21 PNP, 1 PIP	Aníbal Acevedo Vilá (PPD/D)	no such office			no such contest
2005	Aníbal Acevedo Vilá (PPD/D)	15 PNP, 11 PPD, 1 PIP	32 PNP, 18 PPD, 1 PIP	Luis Fortuño (PNP/R)	no such office			no such contest
2006	Aníbal Acevedo Vilá (PPD/D)	15 PNP, 11 PPD, 1 PIP	32 PNP, 18 PPD, 1 PIP	Luis Fortuño (PNP/R)	no such office			no such contest
2007	Aníbal Acevedo Vilá (PPD/D)	15 PNP, 11 PPD, 1 PIP	32 PNP, 18 PPD, 1 PIP	Luis Fortuño (PNP/R)	no such office			no such contest
2008	Aníbal Acevedo Vilá (PPD/D)	15 PNP, 11 PPD, 1 PIP	32 PNP, 18 PPD, 1 PIP	Luis Fortuño (PNP/R)	no such office			no such contest
2009	Luis Fortuño (PNP/R)	22 PNP, 9 PPD	37 PNP, 17 PPD	Pedro Pierluisi (PNP/D)	no such office			no such contest
2010	Luis Fortuño (PNP/R)	22 PNP, 9 PPD	37 PNP, 17 PPD	Pedro Pierluisi (PNP/D)	no such office			no such contest
2011	Luis Fortuño (PNP/R)	22 PNP, 9 PPD	37 PNP, 17 PPD	Pedro Pierluisi (PNP/D)	no such office			no such contest
2012	Luis Fortuño (PNP/R)	22 PNP, 9 PPD	37 PNP, 17 PPD	Pedro Pierluisi (PNP/D)	no such office			no such contest
2013	Alejandro García Padilla (PPD/D)	18 PPD, 8 PNP, 1 PIP	28 PPD, 23 PNP	Pedro Pierluisi (PNP/D)	no such office			no such contest
2014	Alejandro García Padilla (PPD/D)	18 PPD, 8 PNP, 1 PIP	28 PPD, 23 PNP	Pedro Pierluisi (PNP/D)	no such office			no such contest
2015	Alejandro García Padilla (PPD/D)	18 PPD, 8 PNP, 1 PIP	28 PPD, 23 PNP	Pedro Pierluisi (PNP/D)	no such office			no such contest
2016	Alejandro García Padilla (PPD/D)	18 PPD, 8 PNP, 1 PIP	28 PPD, 23 PNP	Pedro Pierluisi (PNP/D)	no such office			no such contest
2017	Ricardo Rosselló (PNP/D)	21 PNP, 7 PPD, 1 PIP, 1 Ind (Note: Three seats were added and awarded to the PPD.)	34 PNP, 16 PPD, 1 PIP	Jenniffer González-Colón (PNP/R)	Zoraida Fonalledas (PNP/R)	Carlos Romero Barceló (PNP/D)	2 PNP/D, 2 PNP/R, 1 Ind	no such contest
2018	Ricardo Rosselló (PNP/D)	21 PNP, 7 PPD, 1 PIP, 1 Ind	34 PNP, 16 PPD, 1 PIP	Jenniffer González-Colón (PNP/R)	Zoraida Fonalledas (PNP/R)	Carlos Romero Barceló (PNP/D)	2 PNP/D, 2 PNP/R, 1 Ind	no such contest
2019	Wanda Vázquez Garced (PNP/R)	21 PNP, 7 PPD, 1 PIP, 1 Ind	34 PNP, 16 PPD, 1 PIP	Jenniffer González-Colón (PNP/R)	Zoraida Fonalledas (PNP/R)	Carlos Romero Barceló (PNP/D)	2 PNP/D, 2 PNP/R, 1 Ind	no such contest
2020	Wanda Vázquez Garced (PNP/R)	21 PNP, 7 PPD, 1 PIP, 1 Ind	34 PNP, 16 PPD, 1 PIP	Jenniffer González-Colón (PNP/R)	Zoraida Fonalledas (PNP/R)	Carlos Romero Barceló (PNP/D)	1 PNP/R, 1 PNP/D, 1 Ind, 2 vacant	no such contest
2021	Pedro Pierluisi (PNP/D)	12 PPD, 10 PNP, 2 MVC, 1 PIP, 1 PD, 1 Ind	26 PPD, 21 PNP, 2 MVC, 1 PIP, 1 PD	Jenniffer González-Colón (PNP/R)	Zoraida Fonalledas (PNP/R)	Carlos Romero Barceló (PNP/D)	1 PNP/R, 1 PNP/D, 1 Ind, 2 vacant	no such contest
2021	Pedro Pierluisi (PNP/D)	12 PPD, 10 PNP, 2 MVC, 1 PIP, 1 PD, 1 Ind	26 PPD, 21 PNP, 2 MVC, 1 PIP, 1 PD	Jenniffer González-Colón (PNP/R)	Melinda Romero Donnelly (PNP/D)	Zoraida Buxó (R)	2 PNP/D, 1 PNP/R, 1 Ind	no such contest
2022	Pedro Pierluisi (PNP/D)	12 PPD, 10 PNP, 2 MVC, 1 PIP, 1 PD, 1 Ind	25 PPD, 21 PNP, 2 MVC, 1 PIP, 1 PD, 1 Ind (Note: PPD Rep. Luis Raúl Torres Cruz left the party and registered as an Independent.)	Jenniffer González-Colón (PNP/R)	Melinda Romero Donnelly (PNP/D)	Zoraida Buxó (R)	2 PNP/D, 1 PNP/R, 1 Ind	no such contest
2023	Pedro Pierluisi (PNP/D)	12 PPD, 10 PNP, 2 MVC, 1 PIP, 1 PD, 1 Ind	25 PPD, 21 PNP, 2 MVC, 1 PIP, 1 PD, 1 Ind	Jenniffer González-Colón (PNP/R)	Melinda Romero Donnelly (PNP/D)	Zoraida Buxó (R)	2 PNP/D, 1 PNP/R, 1 Ind	no such contest
2023	Pedro Pierluisi (PNP/D)	12 PPD, 10 PNP, 2 MVC, 1 PIP, 1 PD, 1 Ind	25 PPD, 21 PNP, 2 MVC, 1 PIP, 1 PD, 1 Ind	Jenniffer González-Colón (PNP/R)	Melinda Romero Donnelly (PNP/D)	Zoraida Buxó (R)	2 PNP/D, 1 PNP/R, 1 vacant (Note: Independent shadow representative Elizabeth Torres Rodriguez was removed from her position.)	no such contest
2024	Pedro Pierluisi (PNP/D)	12 PPD, 10 PNP, 2 MVC, 1 PIP, 1 PD, 1 Ind	25 PPD, 21 PNP, 2 MVC, 1 PIP, 1 PD, 1 Ind	Jenniffer González-Colón (PNP/R)	Melinda Romero Donnelly (PNP/D)	Zoraida Buxó (R)	1 PNP/D, 1 PNP/R, 2 vacant (Note: Shadow representative María Meléndez resigned July 2023)	Kamala Harris/ Tim Walz (D) ✗
2025	Jenniffer González-Colón (PNP/R)	19 PNP, 5 PPD, 2 PIP, 1 PD, 1 Ind (Note: One seat was added and awarded to the PIP.)	36 PNP, 13 PPD, 3 PIP, 1 PD	Pablo Hernández Rivera (PPD/D)	Term expired			Kamala Harris/ Tim Walz (D) ✗
2026	Jenniffer González-Colón (PNP/R)	19 PNP, 5 PPD, 2 PIP, 1 PD, 1 Ind	36 PNP, 13 PPD, 3 PIP, 1 PD	Pablo Hernández Rivera (PPD/D)	Term expired			Kamala Harris/ Tim Walz (D) ✗

== See also ==
- Politics of Puerto Rico
- List of political parties in Puerto Rico
- Elections in Puerto Rico
