= 1924 Puerto Rican general election =

1924 Puerto Rico elections
- November 4, 1924

General elections were held in Puerto Rico on 4 November 1924. Félix Córdova Dávila was re-elected Resident Commissioner.

== Results ==
=== Resident Commissioner ===
Candidate	Party or alliance		Votes	%
Félix Córdova Dávila	Alianza Puertorriqueña	Union of Puerto Rico	132,755	52.32
Félix Córdova Dávila	Alianza Puertorriqueña	Republican Party	30,286	11.94
Félix Córdova Dávila	Alianza Puertorriqueña	Total	163,041	64.26
Fernando J. Géigel	Coalition	Socialist Party	56,103	22.11
Fernando J. Géigel	Coalition	Partido Republicano Puro	34,576	13.63
Fernando J. Géigel	Coalition	Total	90,679	35.74
Total			253,720	100.00
Source: Nolla

=== Senate ===
==== District members ====
Party	Class 1			Class 2			Total seats
Party	Votes	%	Seats	Votes	%	Seats	Total seats
Alianza Puertorriqueña	162,878	64.60	7	161,292	64.36	7	14
Coalition	89,244	35.40	0	89,319	35.64	0	0
Total	252,122	100.00	7	250,611	100.00	7	14
Source: Nolla

=== House of Representatives ===
==== District members ====
Party	Votes	%	Seats
Alianza Puertorriqueña	168,417	65.06	33
Coalition	89,871	34.72	2
Federal Party	440	0.17	0
Nationalist Party	123	0.05	0
Total	258,851	100.00	35
Source: Nolla
