= 1917 Puerto Rican general election =

1917 Puerto Rico elections
- June 16, 1917

General elections were held in Puerto Rico on June 16, 1917. They were the first elections under the Jones–Shafroth Act, which had repealed the Foraker Act of 1900 on March 2. The Jones-Shafroth Act granted United States citizenship to Puerto Ricans. Among the changes brought about by this law were the increase in size of the House of Delegates from 35 to 39 members. Suffrage was denied to women, with only men over 21 years of age who owned property being able to vote. The elections were the last before the 19th Amendment to the United States Constitution granted women the right to vote.

Félix Córdova Dávila was elected Resident Commissioner with 52% of the vote. Arthur Yager, appointed by President Woodrow Wilson, was the governor at the time.

== Results ==
=== Resident Commissioner ===
Candidate	Party	Votes	%
Félix Córdova Dávila	Union of Puerto Rico	90,155	51.53
Domingo Sepúlveda	Republican Party	60,319	34.48
Prudencio Rivera Martinez	Socialist Party	24,468	13.99
Total		174,942	100.00
Source: Nolla

=== Senate ===
Party	At-large			District			Total seats
Party	Votes	%	Seats	Votes	%	Seats	Total seats
Union of Puerto Rico	82,864	56.35	3	179,038	51.52	10	13
Republican Party	42,702	29.04	1	120,120	34.57	4	5
Socialist Party	21,492	14.61	1	48,360	13.92	0	1
Total	147,058	100.00	5	347,518	100.00	14	19
Source: Nolla

==== At-large members ====
Candidate	Party	Votes	%	Notes
Martín Travieso	Union of Puerto Rico	28,118	18.30	Elected
Frank Martínez	Union of Puerto Rico	27,395	17.83	Elected
Eduardo Georgetti	Union of Puerto Rico	27,351	17.80	Elected
José Celso Barbosa	Republican Party	22,103	14.38	Elected
Santiago Iglesias	Socialist Party	28,118	18.30	Elected
Santiago Veve Calzada	Republican Party	20,599	13.40	
Total		153,684	100.00	
Source: Nolla

==== District members ====
Party	Class 1			Class 2			Total seats
Party	Votes	%	Seats	Votes	%	Seats	Total seats
Union of Puerto Rico	98,567	53.93	5	89,471	51.49	5	10
Republican Party	60,054	32.86	2	60,066	34.57	2	4
Socialist Party	24,148	13.21	0	24,212	13.94	0	0
Total	182,769	100.00	7	173,749	100.00	7	14
Source: Nolla

=== House of Representatives ===
Party	Votes	%	Seats
Union of Puerto Rico	89,951	51.83	21
Republican Party	60,091	34.62	13
Socialist Party	23,518	13.55	1
Total	173,560	100.00	35
Source: Nolla

=== Public Service Commissioners ===
Candidate	Party	Votes	%	Notes
José G. Torres	Union of Puerto Rico	89,645	25.80	Elected
Leopoldo Santiago Carmona	Union of Puerto Rico	89,507	25.76	Elected
Julio P. Castro	Republican Party	59,998	17.27	
Guillermo Riefkohl	Republican Party	59,978	17.26	
Roque Rivera	Socialist Party	24,227	6.97	
Santiago Carreras	Socialist Party	24,073	6.93	
Total		347,428	100.00	
Source: Nolla
