= 1928 Puerto Rican general election =

1928 Puerto Rico elections
- November 6, 1928

General elections were held in Puerto Rico on 6 November 1928. Félix Córdova Dávila was re-elected Resident Commissioner.

== Results ==
=== Resident Commissioner ===
Candidate	Party	Votes	%
Félix Córdova Dávila	Alianza Puertorriqueña	132,826	51.82
Prudencio Rivera Martinez	Coalition	123,415	48.15
Other candidates		94	0.04
Total		256,335	100.00
Source: Puerto Rican Election Archive

=== Senate ===
==== At-large members ====
Candidate	Party	Votes	%	Notes
Santiago Iglesias	Coalition	67,990	30.74	Elected
Antonio Rafael Barceló	Alianza Puertorriqueña	47,641	21.54	Elected
Juan Hernández López	Alianza Puertorriqueña	35,709	16.15	Elected
Rafael Martínez Nadal	Coalition	34,342	15.53	Elected
Juan B. Soto	Alianza Puertorriqueña	31,269	14.14	Elected
Alfonso Lastra Chárriez	Coalition	4,206	1.90	
Total		221,157	100.00	
Source: Nolla

==== District members ====
Party	Class 1			Class 2			Total seats
Party	Votes	%	Seats	Votes	%	Seats	Total seats
Alianza Puertorriqueña	132,447	51.79	4	132,465	51.79	4	8
Coalition	123,241	48.19	3	123,316	48.21	3	6
Independents	32	0.01	0	7	0.00	0	0
Total	255,720	100.00	7	255,788	100.00	7	14
Source: Nolla

=== House of Representatives ===
==== At-large members ====
Candidate	Party	Votes	%	Notes
Rafael Alonso Torres	Coalition	67,751	31.75	Elected
José Tous Soto	Alianza Puertorriqueña	43,547	20.41	Elected
Miguel Guerra Mondragón	Alianza Puertorriqueña	32,425	15.20	Elected
Eugenio Fernández García	Alianza Puertorriqueña	34,067	15.97	Elected
Manuel F. Rossy Calderón	Coalition	35,591	16.68	
Total		213,381	100.00	
Source: Nolla

==== District members ====
Party	Votes	%	Seats
Alianza Puertorriqueña	132,509	51.64	19
Coalition	123,564	48.16	16
Other parties	457	0.18	0
Independents	47	0.02	0
Total	256,577	100.00	35
Source: Nolla
