= 1912 Puerto Rican general election =

1912 Puerto Rico elections
- November 5, 1912

General elections were held in Puerto Rico in 1912. Luis Muñoz Rivera was re-elected as Resident Commissioner.

== Results ==
=== Resident Commissioner ===
Candidate	Party	Votes	%
Luis Muñoz Rivera	Union of Puerto Rico	88,301	60.89
Pedro Perea Fajardo	Republican Party	56,708	39.11
Total		145,009	100.00
Source: Nolla
