= Historia de los Partidos Políticos Puertorriqueños (1898–1956) =

Political parties history book set from Puerto Rico

- Historia de los Partidos Políticos Puertorriqueños (1898–1956), Tomo I, Table of Contents
- Author: Bolívar Pagán
- Language: Spanish
- Series: Historia de los Partidos Políticos Puertorriqueños (1898–1956), Tomo I and Tomo II
- Subject: Political history of Puerto Rico
- Genre: Political science
- Publisher: Librería Campos, San Juan, Puerto Rico
- Publication date: 1959 (Tomo I); 1972 (Tomo II)
- Publication place: Puerto Rico
- Media type: Print
- Pages: 342 (Tomo I); 399 (Tomo II)
- OCLC: 1294879
- LC Class: JL1059.A45 P2
- Preceded by: Tomo I
- Followed by: Tomo II

Historia de los Partidos Políticos Puertorriqueños (1898–1956) (English: History of the Puerto Rican Political Parties (1898–1956)) is Bolívar Pagán's 1959 flagship two-volume set on Puerto Rico's political parties. It covers political parties in the years since the American invasion of 1898 through the year 1956.

== Historiography ==
Although Pagán, a Puerto Rico senator (1933–1939) and U.S. Congressman (1939–1945), had written half a dozen other books on politics prior to this set, this set is considered the climax of his political penmanship. Critical reviewer Luis Burset states that "for its thoroughness, focus, and relevance, Bolívar Pagán's Historia de los Partidos Políticos Puertorriqueños is now mandatory reading for understanding the development of Puerto Rico's political parties... it enjoys a position of choice in the Puerto Rican historiography."

The two-volume set numbered Tomo I and Tomo II (volume I and volume II) consists of 342 and 399 pages, respectively. Volume 1 was published in 1959 and covers years 1898 to 1931. Volume II was published in 1972 and covers years 1932 to 1956.

== Critical Reviews ==
The book was reviewed by several critics

== See also ==
- List of political parties in Puerto Rico
- Politics of Puerto Rico
- Political party strength in Puerto Rico
