= 1910 Puerto Rican general election =

1910 Puerto Rico elections
- November 8, 1910

General elections were held in Puerto Rico in 1910. Luis Muñoz Rivera was elected Resident Commissioner.

== Results ==
=== Resident Commissioner ===
Candidate	Party	Votes	%
Luis Muñoz Rivera	Union of Puerto Rico	99,692	63.12
Guillermo Riefkohl	Republican Party	58,256	36.88
Total		157,948	100.00
Source: Nolla
