= Liberal Party of Puerto Rico =

Political party in Puerto Rico

Liberal Party Partido Liberal
- Founder: Antonio R. Barceló
- Founded: 1932
- Dissolved: 1944
- Split from: The Alliance
- Preceded by: Union of Puerto Rico
- Merged into: Popular Democratic Party
- Succeeded by: People's Party
- Ideology: Liberalism; Autonomy
- Political position: Centre
- Colors: Red, Black

The Liberal Party of Puerto Rico (Spanish: Partido Liberal de Puerto Rico) was a pro-Puerto Rican independence political party. The Liberal Party was founded in 1932 as a formal disaffiliation between two political parties which composed the political coalition known as the Alianza (Alliance).

== Founding ==
The Alianza (also called the Coalition) was a coalition between the pro-independence Union Party led by Antonio R. Barceló and the pro-statehood Republican Party of Puerto Rico led by José Tous Soto. Differences between Barceló, Tous Soto and Félix Córdova Dávila, the Resident Commissioner of Puerto Rico in Washington, as to the goals of the alliance became apparent. Barceló requested that Herbert Hoover, the newly elected President of the United States, temporarily retain Horace Mann Towner as governor of the island. Hoover consulted Córdova Dávila instead of Barceló in regard to his intentions of naming Theodore Roosevelt Jr. to the post. Córdova Dávila in turn notified Tous Soto, instead of Barceló, as to Hoover's decision.

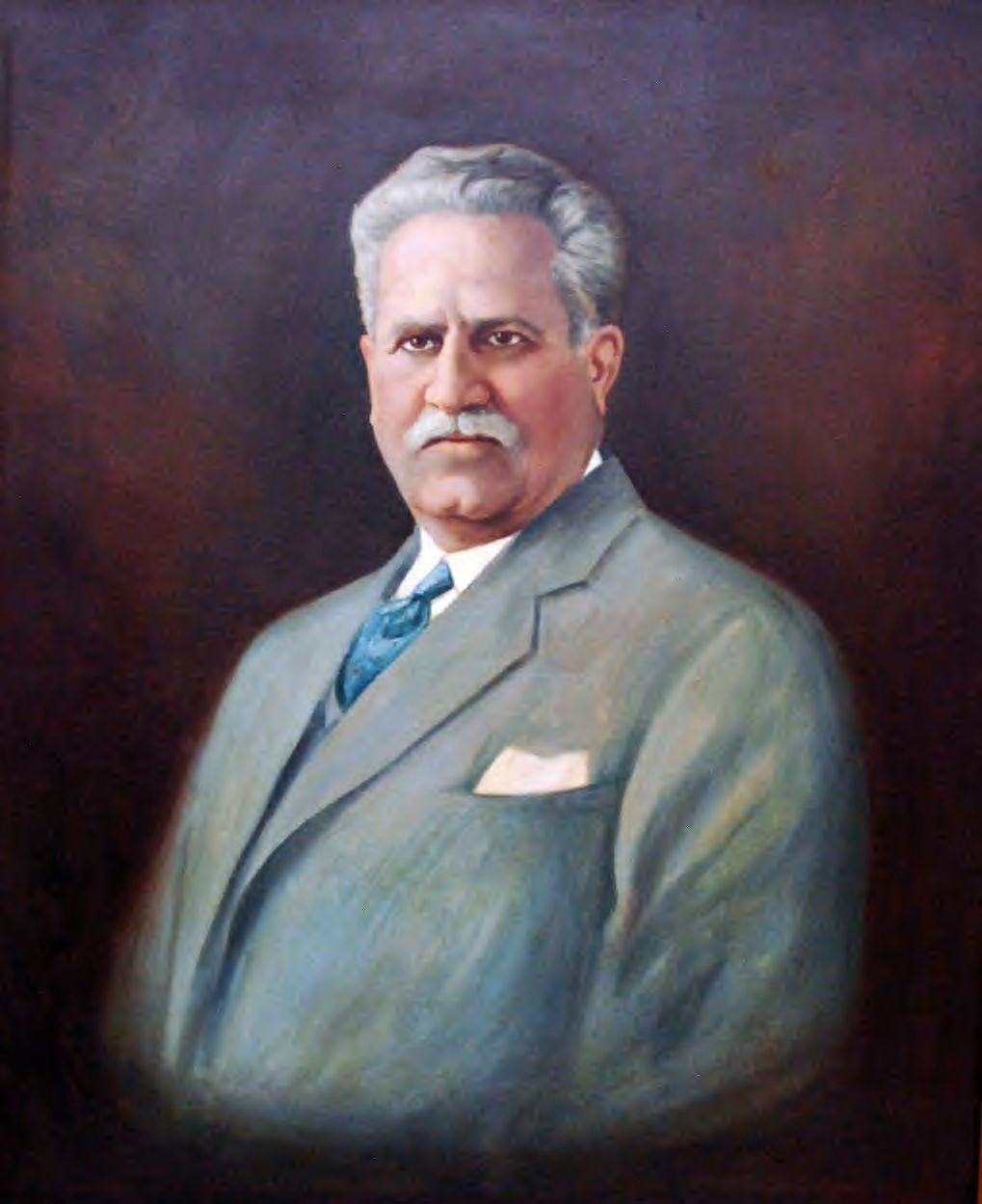
Antonio R. Barceló, founder of the Liberal Party of Puerto Rico

Barceló was offended and convinced his followers, in the Unionist sector of the alliance, to disaffiliate themselves from the "Alliance." Because of legal reasons, Barceló was unable to use the name "Union Party" and in 1932 founded the "Liberal Party of Puerto Rico." The Liberal Party's political agenda was the same as the original Union Party's agenda and urged independence as a political solution for Puerto Rico. Among those who joined him in the "new" party were Felisa Rincón de Gautier and Ernesto Ramos Antonini. By 1932, Luis Muñoz Rivera's son, Luis Muñoz Marín, had also joined the Liberal Party. During the elections of 1932, the Liberal Party faced the Alliance, then a coalition of the Republican Party of Puerto Rico and Santiago Iglesias' Socialist Party. Barceló and Muñoz Marín were both elected senators. The Liberals generally supported the policies of the New Deal and sought to translate the programs to Puerto Rico. It was the single strongest party from 1932 to 1940. It was prevented from taking a majority of seats by the Coalición.

== Decline ==
By 1936, differences between Muñoz Marín and Barceló began to surface. While Barceló dedicated himself to the local political activities of the party in Puerto Rico, Muñoz Marín was in Washington, D.C., where, with the help of news reporter Ruby Black, he became known among the politicians of the United States. Among his successes in Washington was the implementation of the "Plan Chardon" in the New Deal of the Roosevelt Administration, which he did without consulting Barceló. The successes of Muñoz Marín convinced many in the island that he was the true leader of the Liberal Party, thereby creating a faction within the party between those who considered Muñoz Marín the true leader and those who considered Barceló as their leader.

After the assassination of police colonel Francis Riggs in San Juan as an indirect result of the Río Piedras massacre, which involved the police and students of the University of Puerto Rico, U.S. Senator Millard Tydings presented a legislative proposal in 1936 to grant independence to Puerto Rico. Barceló and the Liberal Party favored the bill, as did other Puerto Rican parties of the time, because it would give Puerto Rico its independence; Muñoz Marín opposed the bill because he thought it had unfavorable economic conditions.

In 1936, a party assembly was held in San Juan where Muñoz Marín stated that he was not interested in being considered for the position of Resident Commissioner and that Barceló should be the Commissioner. This move would leave the presidency of the party empty and open for Muñoz Marín. Barceló refused to be named Commissioner and to relinquish his presidency. Muñoz Marín and his followers founded a group within the party called "Accion Social Puertorriqueño" (Puerto Rican Social Action) who believed in the immediate independence of Puerto Rico. After the Liberal Party was defeated in 1936 elections, an assembly was held in Naranjales on May 31, 1937, in which Muñoz Marín presented his ideas as to how the party should be run; however, the majority of the party members objected and blamed him for their defeat. Muñoz Marín considered this action the same as having been expelled from the party.

Muñoz Marín and his followers, among which were included Felisa Rincon de Gautier and Ernesto Ramos Antonini, held an assembly in the town of Arecibo, founded the Clear, Net, Authentic, and Complete Liberal Party (Partido Liberal, Neto, Auténtico y Completo), claiming to be the true Liberal Party. The Partido Liberal, Neto, Auténtico y Completo, an independence political party, later became the Popular Democratic Party (PPD), which would end up promoting the "Estado Libre Associado" (Free Associated State) status that Barceló, as president of Union Party, had asked for in 1923 under Campbell Bill and which Muñoz Marín had always opposed, instead of independence.

Maria Antonia Josefina Barceló was elected president of the Liberal Party upon the passing of her father in 1938, thus becoming the first woman to preside a political party in Puerto Rico. In the years that followed, the Liberal Party lost its base of support to the PPD. The Liberal Party only survived as an electoral force until 1944.

== See also ==
- List of Puerto Ricans (Politicians)
- Senate of Puerto Rico
