= Partido Republicano Puro =

Partido Republicano Puro (Note: The party was also known as "Partido Constitucional Histórico" (Historic Constitutional Party), see Historia de Puerto Rico: Unidad #6 (partidos políticos).) (Pure Republican Party), also known as Partido Constitucional Histórico, was a political party that existed in Puerto Rico from 1924 to 1932. The party's main goal was the annexation of Puerto Rico into the American Union as a state. It resulted from a split of Partido Republicano de Puerto Rico on May 4, 1924. Its president was Rafael Martínez Nadal. The party dissolved in 1932 when it joined members of the conservative end of the Alianza Puertorriqueña to form Partido Unión Republicana (Republican Union Party).

== Background ==
The Puerto Rico Organic Law of 1917 resulted in new elections taking place in July 1917. Three political parties sent representatives to the Puerto Rico Legislature as a result of those elections: Union de Puerto Rico sent 13 members to the Puerto Rico Senate, while Partido Republicano de Puerto Rico sent five, and Partido Socialista sent one.

Partido Republicano also ended up with a minority in Puerto Rico House of Representatives, though proportionally much stronger than its representation in the Senate. However, and seemingly encouraged in their annexation goals by the granting of US citizenship to Puerto Ricans, while a minority on both chambers, the members of Partido Republicano operated in a very combative fashion with their majority colleagues, the Unionists, whose main tenet was independence for Puerto Rico. Meanwhile there was also conflict inside the Union Party because some of its members (its most conservative) supported complete independence from the United States, while others (its more liberals) supported mere autonomy. In 1924 statehood supporters in Partido Union de Puerto Rico joined the liberal faction in Partido Republicano to form a new party, La Alianza for the 1928 elections. The liberal faction in Partido Republicano had other priorities above becoming a state of the Union.

== Foundation ==
The agreements that formed La Alianza left Partido Republicano with much lower prospects to win in the elections of 1924. As such the remaining members of the Partido Republicano (its most conservative wing) re-branded themselves as Partido Republicano Puro on 4 May 1924. It subsequently joined Partido Socialista to form an electoral bloc called "Coalición".

== Alliances ==
After the 1928 elections which despite the efforts of the Republicanos Puros and the Socialistas were still won by La Alianza, in 1932 Partido Republicano Puro joined the conservative wing of La Alianza to create a new party Union Republicana, bringing an end to Partido Republicano Puro that same year.

== See also ==
- Republican Party of Puerto Rico (1899)
- Republican Party of Puerto Rico (1903)
- Partido Estadista Puertorriqueño
