= José Celso Barbosa Day (Puerto Rico) =

Commemorates the birth of the father of Puerto Rico's statehood movement

José Celso Barbosa Day is celebrated in Puerto Rico every July 27 to commemorate the birth of the father of Puerto Rico's statehood movement. The official commemoration is usually held in his native city, Bayamón, Puerto Rico, where the house in which he was born has been turned into a museum operated by the Institute of Puerto Rican Culture and the city government. A more modest ceremony is usually also held in front of his tomb at the Santa María de Pazzis Cemetery in historic Old San Juan.
