= Republican Party of Puerto Rico =

Local affiliate of the Republican Party in Puerto Rico

Republican Party of Puerto Rico Partido Republicano de Puerto Rico
- Chairperson: Angel M. Cintrón
- Founded: 1899
- Headquarters: San Juan, Puerto Rico
- Ideology: Conservatism; Puerto Rican statehood
- Political position: Right-wing
- National affiliation: Republican Party (Note: Affiliation to US National Republican Party (GOP) was withdrawn by the National Committee in 1916 but reinstated in 1919. (See Bolívar Pagán's Historia de los Partidos Politicos de Puerto Rico, 1898-1956, Tomo I. (San Juan, Puerto Rico: Librería Campos. 1959.) p. 239. OCLC 1627009)
- Colors: Red

Website
- www.republicanpartyofpuertorico.gop

The Republican Party of Puerto Rico (Spanish: Partido Republicano de Puerto Rico) is the local affiliate of the national United States Republican Party in Puerto Rico. The affiliation started in 1903. The party does not participate in the November elections mandated by the Constitution of Puerto Rico for local registered political parties because it is not a registered party in Puerto Rico for local electoral purposes. Instead, the party holds its own elections to select the Puerto Rico delegates to the Republican National Convention and holds presidential primaries on the last Sunday of February. (Note: Presidential primaries of the Republican party are held in Puerto Rico on the last Sunday of February as long as it does not precede or coincide with the celebration of the presidential primary of the State of New Hampshire. If there is a conflict, the presidential Republican primary in Puerto Rico is held on the first Sunday of March. (See, Rules of the Republican Party. Section § 1324.))

The Republican Party of Puerto Rico's ideology supports statehood for Puerto Rico. The local affiliate is based in San Juan, Puerto Rico.

== History ==
The origin of the Republican Party of Puerto Rico can be traced to the aftermath of the Spanish–American War. Once the Spanish–American War came to an end in 1898, Puerto Rico became a territory of the United States. At that point, the former Spanish colonial-era parties that existed in Puerto Rico were forced to redefine themselves given the new political reality created by the change in sovereignty. On July 4, 1899, the dissenting wing of one of such parties, the Partido Autonomista (Autonomist Party), which had just formed Partido Autonomista Ortodoxo in 1897, founded a party with an ideology of annexation to the United States and called it Partido Republicano de Puerto Rico (Republican Party of Puerto Rico). This new party favored joining the United States as a federated state and was led by José Celso Barbosa. In 1903 the Republican Party of Puerto Rico affiliated itself with the U.S. Republican Party.

In 1924 Partido Republicano de Puerto Rico split into two factions: one faction joined with the Union Party to form the Alianza (The Alliance), a pro-autonomy group, and the other faction, renamed itself Partido Republicano Puro (Pure Republican Party) and joined with the Socialist Party to form the pro-statehood Coalición (The Coalition). The 1924 split brought Partido Republicano de Puerto Rico to an end, and Coalición became the de facto pro-statehood ideology.

== Ideology ==
The Republican Party of Puerto Rico believes in equal and full citizenship rights for U.S. citizens of Puerto Rico, and that this can only be achieved through statehood for Puerto Rico.

== Republican presidential primaries 2016 results ==
Candidates	Recent positions	Logo	Island delegates	Popular vote	Senatorial districts
Donald Trump	Chairman of The Trump Organization (1971–2017)		0	5,052 (13.1%)	None
Ted Cruz	U.S. Senator from Texas (2013–present)		0	3,340 (8.6%)	None
Marco Rubio	U.S. Senator from Florida (2011–2025)		20 Delegates	27,485 (71.0%)	All 8 districts
Other Candidates			0	1,356 total votes	None
Official Result by Puerto Rico's State Election Commission

== See also ==
- Democratic Party (Puerto Rico)
- Republican Party (United States)
- Partido Republicano Puertorriqueño
