= José Celso Barbosa =

Puerto Rican politician

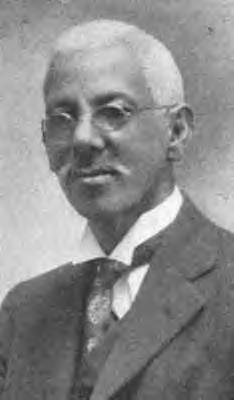
- Dr. José Celso Barbosa

Member of the Executive Cabinet
- In office 1900–1917

Member of the Puerto Rico Senate from the at-large district
- In office 1917–1921

Personal details
- Born: July 27, 1857 Bayamón, Puerto Rico
- Died: September 21, 1921 (aged 64) San Juan, Puerto Rico
- Party: Puerto Rican Republican Party
- Spouse: Belén Sánchez y Jimenez
- Education: University of Michigan (MD)
- Profession: Medical physician; sociologist; political leader in Puerto Rico

José Celso Barbosa Alcala (July 27, 1857 – September 21, 1921) was a Puerto Rican physician, sociologist and political leader. Known as the father of the statehood movement in Puerto Rico, Barbosa was the first Puerto Rican, and one of the first people of African descent, to earn a medical degree in the United States.

After his return to the island in 1880, Barbosa made many contributions to medicine and public health. He initiated an early form of health insurance, encouraging employers to pay a fee to cover the future needs of their employees. In 1900, Barbosa was among the first five Puerto Rican leaders appointed to the Executive Cabinet under Governor Charles H. Allen, in the first civilian government organized by the United States. He served in the Cabinet until 1917. From 1917 to 1921, Barbosa served in the first elected Puerto Rican Senate.

== Early life and education ==
Barbosa was born in 1857 in the city of Bayamón, Puerto Rico where he received both his primary and secondary education. Though he was a product of European and west African lineages, Celso y Barbosa was the first person of any African ancestry to attend Puerto Rico's prestigious Jesuit seminary, Colegio San Ignacio de Loyola in San Juan. After graduating, Barbosa tutored private students to save money to attend college. In 1875, he moved to New York City to attend prep school, where he learned English in a year.

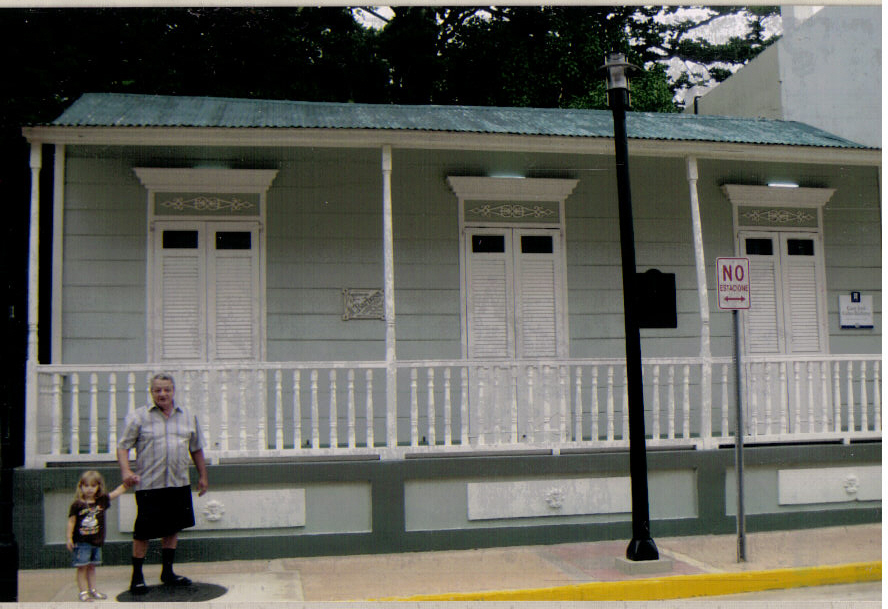
Museo José Celso Barbosa, the doctor's birthplace and childhood home

Originally Barbosa wished to become a lawyer, but after he suffered a bout of pneumonia in New York City, his doctor recommended that he study medicine. In 1877 he applied but was denied admission to the College of Physicians and Surgeons at Columbia University, due to his African heritage . He then applied and was admitted to the medical school of the University of Michigan, where he graduated as valedictorian of the class of 1880. Barbosa was the first person from Puerto Rico to earn a medical degree in the United States. He returned to Puerto Rico, where he set up a practice in his hometown of Bayamón.

== Early career ==
The Spanish colonial government initially did not recognize Barbosa's medical degree, as it was not from a known European university. The American consul to the island intervened on behalf of Barbosa to have his United States degree recognized, so that he could practice.

Barbosa provided medical care all over the island. He introduced the novel idea of employers paying a fee for the future healthcare needs of their employees (a very early health insurance system). In 1893, Barbosa founded the first Puerto Rican cooperative and named it El Ahorro Colectivo.

== Political career ==
During the Spanish colonial period, Barbosa was a member of the Partido Autonomista Puro (Pure Autonomous Party), also known as "Partido Histórico" and "Partido Ortodoxo", led by Román Baldorioty de Castro, but left because of ideological differences.

In 1898, when the United States bombarded and blockaded San Juan during the Spanish–American War, Barbosa and other doctors who lived in Bayamón traveled to the town of Cataño and took a ferry to the capital. Barbosa, as a member of the Red Cross, went to the aid of the wounded Puerto Rican and Spanish soldiers. He and his party on the ferry had to travel across San Juan Bay at risk, as they were under cannon fire. Barbosa and those with him were recommended by the Spanish government for the Cruz de la Orden del Mérito Naval (The Cross of the Order of Naval Merit) for their bravery.

As a result of the war, the United States made Puerto Rico one of its territories. On July 4, 1899, Barbosa formed the pro-statehood Partido Republicano de Puerto Rico. He became known as the father of the statehood for Puerto Rico movement.

== Later years ==
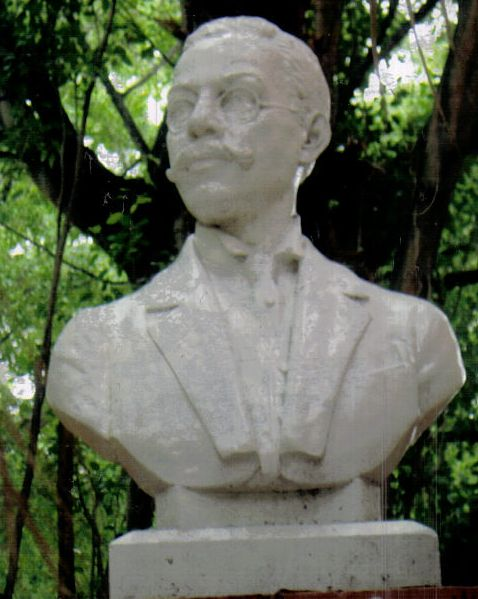
Bust of Dr. Barbosa

On June 5, 1900, President William McKinley named Barbosa, together with Rosendo Matienzo Cintrón, José de Diego, Manuel Camuñas and Andrés Crosas, as part of an Executive Cabinet under U.S.-appointed Governor Charles H. Allen, the first civilian governor of the island. The Executive Cabinet also included six American members. Barbosa served on the Executive Cabinet until 1917, dealing with a variety of governors appointed by the US during that period, and providing continuity in administration.

During this period, in 1907 he founded the newspaper El Tiempo, the first bilingual newspaper published on the island.

With representative elections authorized in 1917, Barbosa ran for an at-large seat. He was elected, serving as a member of the first Puerto Rican Senate, from 1917 to 1921.

José Celso Barbosa died in San Juan on September 21, 1921. He was buried in Santa Maria Magdalena de Pazzis Cemetery in Old San Juan. One of his daughters, Pilar Barbosa, became a historian, serving as the Official Historian of Puerto Rico from 1993 to 1997. She was also a political activist who carried on her father's work.

== Legacy and honors ==
- Puerto Rico has declared his birthday, July 27, an official holiday, known as José Celso Barbosa Day.
- Barbosa's house in Bayamón has been preserved and is operated as a historic house museum. Many of his awards, certificates, books and other artifacts of interest are on exhibit.
- On August 1, 2006, the United States Postal Service Post Office at 100 Avenida RL Rodriguez in Bayamón was named as the "Dr. Jose Celso Barbosa Post Office Building". The act for this was signed by President George W. Bush. (Note: Public Law 109-253; House Resolution 3440; U.S. 109th Congress in 2006)
- In Ponce, there is a school named after him.
- Avenida José C. Barbosa, in Yauco, is named for him.
- In East Harlem, P.S. 206M, an elementary school, is co-named for Barbosa.

== Personal life ==
Barbosa had twelve children including, Roberto C. Barbosa who became a dentist, Guillermo H. Barbosa, who became a surgeon and Pilar Barbosa de Rosario, who became Puerto Rico's first female official historian and married José Ezequiel Rosario. His cousin Jesus, gave birth to Oddosia "Thea" Barbosa.

== See also ==
- List of Puerto Ricans
- Pilar Barbosa

== Notes ==
Senate of Puerto Rico
Preceded by First Minority Leader	Minority Leader of the Puerto Rico Senate; 1917–1920	Succeeded by José Tous Soto
Party political offices
Preceded by Founding Chairman	Chairman of the Puerto Rico Republican Party; 1899–1921	Succeeded by José Tous Soto
