= José Tous Soto =

Puerto Rican politician

Member of the Puerto Rico Senate from the Ponce district
- In office 1917–1924

8th Speaker of the Puerto Rico House of Representatives
- In office 1925–1930

Personal details
- Born: October 2, 1874 San Lorenzo, Puerto Rico
- Died: March 22, 1933 (aged 58) San Juan, Puerto Rico
- Party: Liberal Party
- Other political affiliations: Republican Party; Alianza Puertorriqueña
- Education: University of Oviedo (LLD)
- Profession: Politician, Attorney

José Tous Soto (October 2, 1874 – March 22, 1933) was a Puerto Rican politician and former Senator and Representative.

== Early years and education ==
José Tous Soto was born in San Lorenzo on October 2, 1874. He graduated with a Doctorate in Civil Law from the University of Oviedo in Spain.

== Appointed as judge ==
He was appointed Associate Judge of the District Court of Arecibo. In 1903 Soto sits as district judge of the important office of San Juan, then moving to Ponce again, where he served until 1908.

== Political career ==
=== Party alliance ===
Tous began his political career with the Liberal Fusionist Party, led by Luis Muñoz Rivera. He then joined the Republican Party.

=== Legislator ===
In 1900, he was chosen to occupy a seat in the House of Delegates of Puerto Rico, representing the district of Guayama. In 1914, he was elected for another term, this time representing the district of Ponce.

In 1917, Tous was a member of the first Puerto Rican Senate established by the Jones-Shafroth Act. He represented the District VI (Guayama).

Served as Speaker of the Puerto Rico House of Representatives from 1925 to 1930.

When the Campbell autonomy plan was presented in Congress in 1922, Tous opposed it. The project offered Puerto Rico the possible development of an autonomous state.

=== Leadership in the Alianza ===
He continued serving at the Senate, until 1924. That year, Tous and Antonio Barceló, then Senate president, led a merging of the Republican Party with the opposing Union of Puerto Rico, forming Alianza Puertorriqueña. The merging came as a means to unify the efforts of the politicians legislating in favor of better conditions for Puerto Ricans. As a result, Tous became a member of the House of Representatives while Barceló continued in the Senate.

== Death ==
Tous Soto died on March 22, 1933.

Political offices
Preceded by Miguel Guerra Mondragrón	8th Speaker of the Puerto Rico House of Representatives; 1925–1930	Succeeded by Manuel F. Rossy Calderón
Party political offices
Preceded by José Celso Barbosa	Chairman of the Puerto Rico Republican Party; 1921–1932	Succeeded by Rafael Martínez Nadal
