= Partido Liberal Neto, Auténtico y Completo =

Political party in Puerto Rico

Partido Liberal Neto, Auténtico y Completo (roughly, in English, the Transparent, Authentic and Complete Liberal Party) was a political party in Puerto Rico from 1937 to 1948.

Luis Muñoz Marín, the son of a former Resident Commissioner, founded the party after being expelled from the Liberal Party on 31 May 1937. The party was the precursor of the Popular Democratic Party (PPD).

The party formed at Teatro Oliver in Arecibo, Puerto Rico, on 27 June 1937. Its governing board was composed of: Luis Muñoz Marin (President); General Vice-presidents: Francisco Susorri (father), Rodolfo Ramirez Pabon, Ernesto Ramos Antonini, Librada R. Vda de Ramos; District-based Vice-presidents: Manuel A. Garcia Mendez (Aguadilla), Juan Davila Diaz (Arecibo), Enrique Manrique (Guayama), Rafael Calderon (Humacao), Santiago M. Palmer (Mayaguez), Andres Grillasca (Ponce), Samuel R. Quiñones (San Juan).
