= Partido Republicano Puertorriqueño =

Former major political party in Puerto Rico

Partido Republicano Puertorriqueño (English: Puerto Rican Republican Party) was a political party founded in Puerto Rico on July 4, 1899. The party dissolved in 1924 when it split into two factions, both factions forming alliances with other local parties. It was led by Dr. José Celso Barbosa.

== History ==
The origin of the Partido Republicano Puertorriqueño can be traced to the aftermath of the Spanish–American War. Once the Spanish–American War came to an end in 1898, Puerto Rico became a territory of the United States. At that point, the former Spanish colonial-era parties that existed in Puerto Rico were forced to redefine themselves given the new political reality created by the change in governments. On July 4, 1899, the dissenting wing of one of such parties, the Partido Autonomista (Autonomist Party), which had just formed Partido Autonomista Ortodoxo in 1897, founded a party with an ideology of annexation to the United States and called it Partido Republicano Puertorriqueño. This new party favored joining the United States as a federated state and was led by Dr. José Celso Barbosa.

In 1924 Partido Republicano de Puerto Rico split into two factions: one faction joined with the pro-autonomy group Union Party to form the Alianza Puertorriqueña (The Alliance), and the other faction formed Partido Republicano Puro (Pure Republican Party) and joined with the Socialist Party to form the pro-statehood bloc called Coalición (The Coalition). The 1924 split brought Partido Republicano de Puerto Rico to an end.

=== Alignment ===
In 1903, the party became an affiliate of the national Republican Party of the United States. This affiliation lasted until 1916 when, with the victory of Democratic President Woodrow Wilson, the U.S. national party unincorporated the Puerto Rico Republican Party from its national roster. Three years later, in 1919, the party resumed its affiliation to the national party with the prospects of Republican victory in the U.S. 1920 Presidential elections. However, Partido Republicano Puertorriqueño has had an ideology of aligning itself with whichever national party would be the party victorious in the presidential elections and, with time, future U.S. Republican administrations showed little interest in Puerto Rico's local Partido Republicano Puertorriqueño.

== Party chairpersons ==
Chairperson	Term	Electoral Party Name
José Celso Barbosa	1899–1921	Partido Republicano de Puerto Rico (Republican Party of Puerto Rico)
José Tous Soto	1921–1924	Partido Republicano de Puerto Rico (Republican Party of Puerto Rico)

== See also ==
- Republican Party of Puerto Rico
