= Puerto Rico statehood movement =

Movement to grant Puerto Rico U.S. statehood

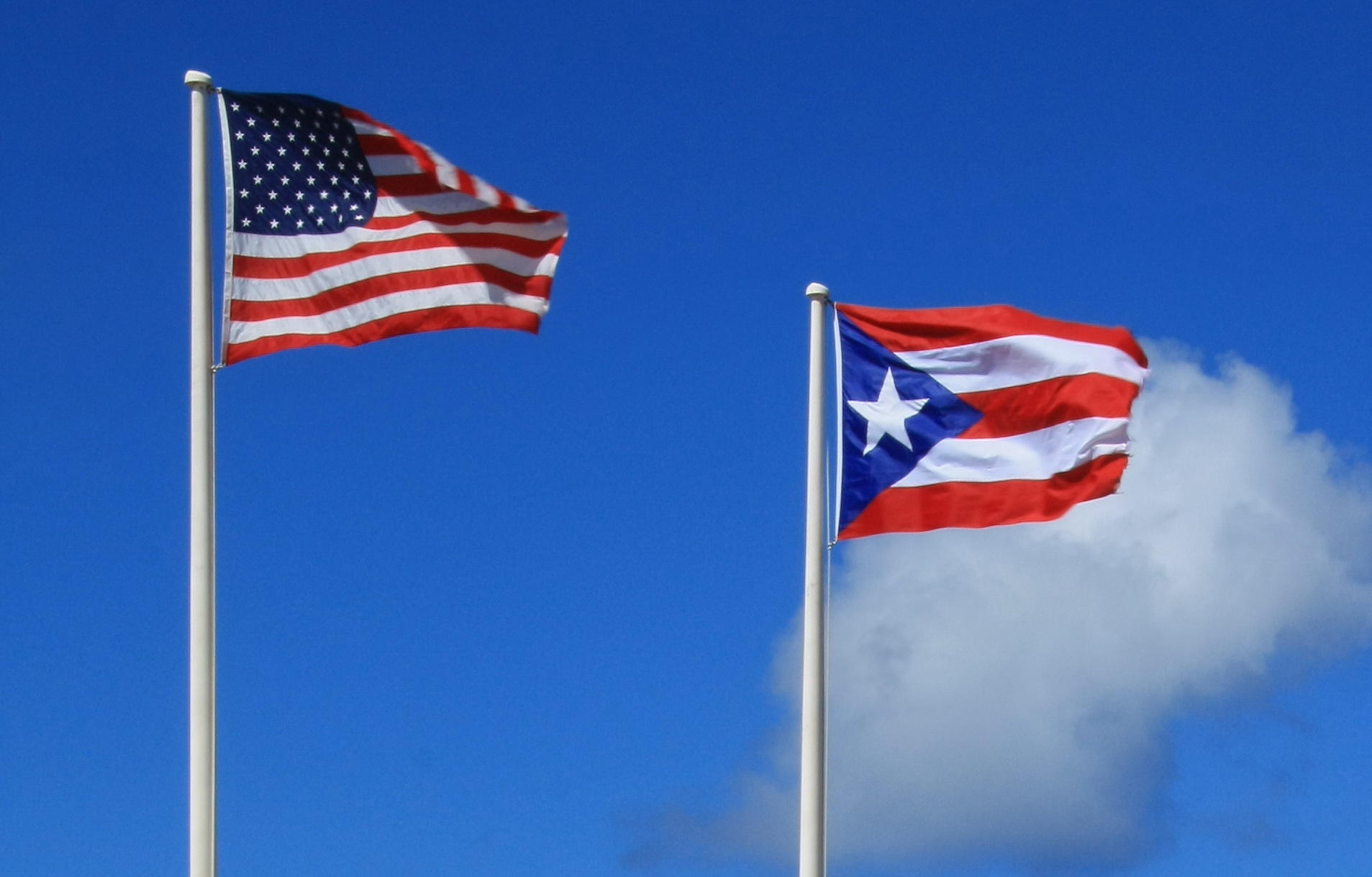
Flag of the United States (left) alongside Flag of Puerto Rico (right)

The Puerto Rico statehood movement (Spanish: movimiento estadista de Puerto Rico) is a political movement which aims to make Puerto Rico a state of the United States. Currently, Puerto Rico is an unincorporated organized territory. Puerto Rico was acquired by the United States in 1898 following the US victory at the Spanish–American War.

As of 2023, the population of Puerto Rico is 3.2 million, around half the average state population and higher than that of 19 U.S. states. Statehood is one of several competing options for the future political status of Puerto Rico, including: maintaining its current status, becoming fully independent, or becoming a freely associated state. Puerto Rico has held seven referendums on the political status of the island: 1967 and 1993, which resulted in a Commonwealth victory, 1998, where "None of the above" was the winner, 2012, 2017, 2020 and 2024, the latter four resulting in a statehood win. Opponents of statehood disputed the legitimacy of those latter referendums.

In the 2020 referendum, the 55% turnout rate equaled that for the simultaneous 2020 gubernatorial race and the 2016 gubernatorial race. The most recent referendum was in 2024, with a majority (58.61%) of valid votes cast for statehood. The turnout rate increased to 57%. However, at this referendum, the option to keep the current status was not on the ballot.

However, these referendums are non-binding, as the power to grant statehood lies with the United States Congress. Due to Puerto Rico's status, some have described it as "the oldest colony in the modern world". (Note: Puerto Rico was a colony of Spain from 1493 to 1898, when it passed to be a colonial possession of the United States, classified by the United States as "an unincorporated territory". In 1914, the Puerto Rican House of Delegates voted unanimously in favor of independence from the United States, but this was rejected by the U.S. Congress as "unconstitutional" and in violation of the U.S. 1900 Foraker Act. In 1952, after the United States Congress approved Puerto Rico's constitution, its formal name became "Commonwealth of Puerto Rico", but its new name "did not change Puerto Rico's political, social, and economic relationship to the United States." That year, the United States advised the United Nations (UN) that the island was a self-governing territory. During its 8th session, the United Nations General Assembly recognized Puerto Rico's self-government on November 27, 1953, with Resolution 748 (VIII). UN Resolution "748 (VIII)" was adopted on November 27, 1953, during its 459th Plenary Meeting. This removed Puerto Rico's classification as a non-self-governing territory (under article 73(e) of the Charter of the United Nations). The resolution passed, garnering a favorable vote from some 40% of the General Assembly, with over 60% abstaining or voting against it (20 to 16, plus 18 abstentions). Today, however, the UN "still debates whether Puerto Rico is a colony" or not. The island has been called a colony by many, including US Federal judges, US Congresspeople, the Chief Justice of the Puerto Rico Supreme Court, and numerous scholars. For additional references to Puerto Rico's current colonial status under U.S. rule, see Nicole Narea, Amy Goodman and Ana Irma Rivera Lassén, David S. Cohen and Sidney W. Mintz.)

== Background ==
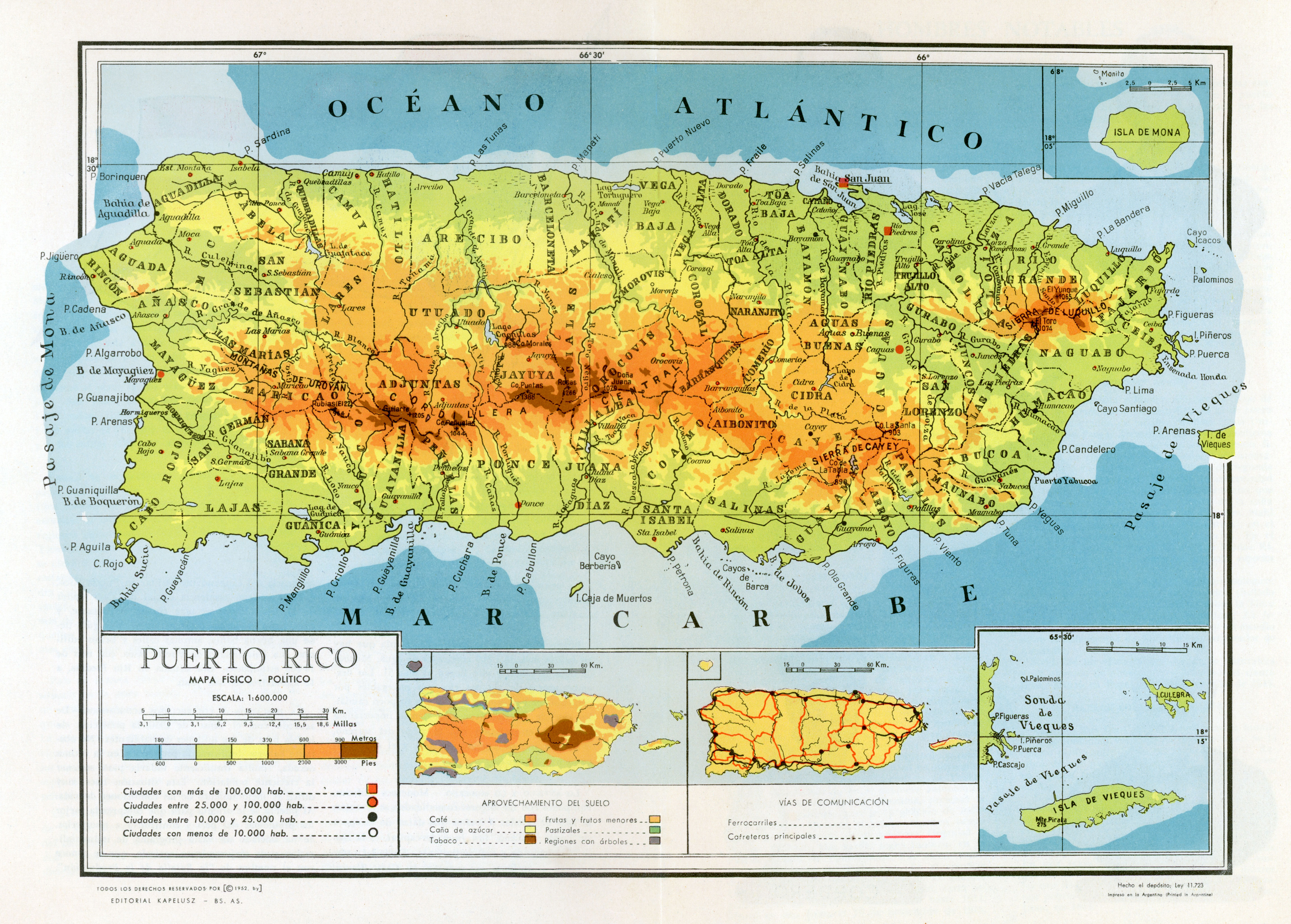
Map of Puerto Rico from 1952

Following the Spanish–American War, Puerto Rico was ceded to the United States in 1898, through the signing of the Treaty of Paris. Puerto Rico became an unincorporated, organized territory of the US through a series of judicial decisions by the Supreme Court of the United States, collectively known as the Insular Cases and the enactment of several statutes by Congress.

In 1900, the U.S. Congress enacted the Foraker Act, establishing a civil government in the territory and then in 1917, Puerto Ricans were granted United States citizenship, by the enactment of the Jones-Shafroth Act. The Office of the President is responsible for policy relations between the United States and Puerto Rico, although according to the Territorial Clause of Constitution of the United States of America "The Congress shall have power to dispose of and make all needful Rules and Regulations respecting the Territory or other Property belonging to the United States...".

In 1946, Puerto Rican native Jesús T. Piñero was appointed as governor. The first Puerto Rican gubernatorial election happened in 1948 and resulted in a victory of Popular Democratic Party candidate Luis Muñoz Marín. In 1952, voters in Puerto Rico approved a new constitution proposed by Governor Muñoz Marin after increased pressure locally along with internationally to decolonize the island; this led to the territory being designated as a commonwealth. This new title of "commonwealth" did not change how Puerto Rico was related to the United States, allowing Congress to continue holding power over it as an unincorporated territory. The current constitution of Puerto Rico entered into force on July 25, 1952.

=== Potential benefits of statehood ===
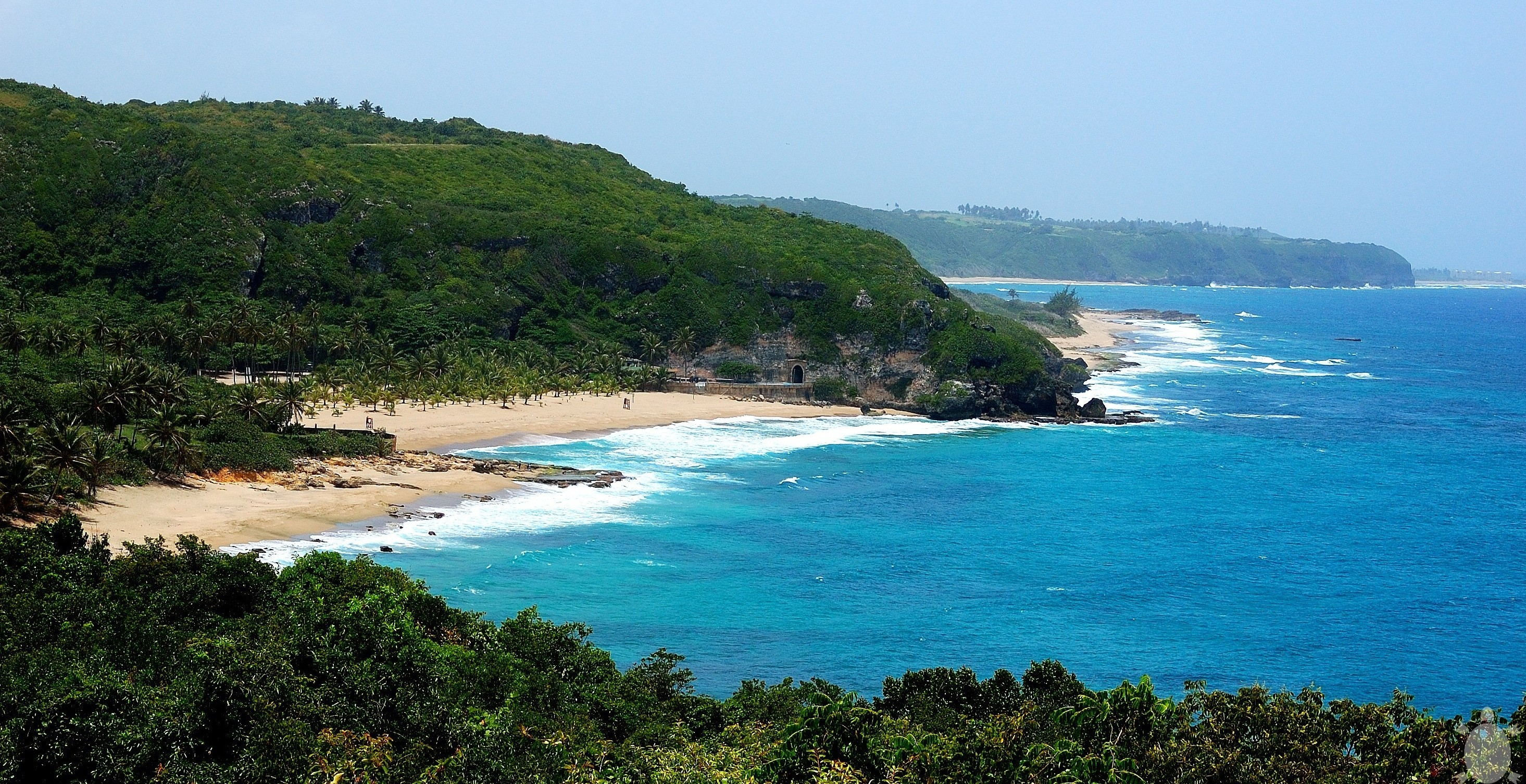
Aguadilla, Puerto Rico

A United States flag with 51 stars. According to the Flag Act of 1818, a new star must be added to the United States's flag for every new state admitted to the Union. If Puerto Rico becomes a US state, the United States may have a flag similar or identical to the flag displayed above

Puerto Rico is, by a large margin, the largest U.S. territory in terms of both population and geographical area, being similar to Connecticut with respect to population size (~3.3 million to CT's 3.6 million) and geographical area (13,791 square km to CT's 14,357). Puerto Rico residents do not participate in the Presidential elections because Puerto Rico does not have any electoral votes, but individual Puerto Ricans do have the right to vote when residing in a U.S. state or the District of Columbia. If Puerto Rico were to become a state, they would gain the ability to vote in Presidential elections.

Benefits of statehood include an additional $10 billion per year in federal funds, the right to vote in presidential elections, higher Social Security and Medicare benefits, increased minimum wage, and a right for its government agencies and municipalities to file for bankruptcy. The latter is currently prohibited.

The primary debate over Puerto Rican statehood is about representation. Some proposals seek to give it representation without statehood, giving it its apportioned representatives in the House and two Senators like a state without officially adding it to the union.

Whether Puerto Rico is given statehood or simply apportioned members of Congress as a Commonwealth or territory, this will have an impact on the make-up of the House. As the Reapportionment Act of 1929 mandates the House be capped at 435 members, Puerto Rico would end up with Representatives that would otherwise have been apportioned to other states.

== History ==
Since the transfer of sovereignty of Puerto Rico from Spain to the United States, the relationship between Puerto Rico and the US has been debated by many. On April 11, 1899, the peace treaty between Spain and the USA (the 1898 Treaty of Paris) became effective, and established a military government in Puerto Rico. This was short lived, since the following year (April 2, 1900) Congress enacted the Foraker Act, which established a civil government and free trade between Puerto Rico and the USA. Puerto Ricans, although incapable of electing members of the territory's executive branch, were now able to elect their local representatives and a resident commissioner to the US Congress, who had a voice but no vote. In 1917, the enactment of the Jones-Shafroth Act the territory of Puerto Rico was organized and statutory US citizenship was granted to its residents.

Since 1967, there have been several referendums, which included questions on statehood. Puerto Ricans chose not to alter the status quo in referendums until 2012. The 2012 referendum produced a more equivocal result.

=== 1967 referendum ===
A referendum on the status of the island was held in Puerto Rico on July 23, 1967. Voters were given the choice between being a Commonwealth, statehood or independence. The majority of voters voted for Commonwealth status while around 40% showed support for joining as a state, with a voter turnout of 65.9%.

=== 1998 referendum ===
A referendum in December 1998 offered voters four political status options: statehood, independence, free association, and territorial commonwealth, plus "none of the above." The latter option won 50.5% of the vote, followed by statehood, with 46.6%. Turnout was 71%.

=== 2012 referendum ===
On November 6, 2012, voters were presented with two questions:
(1) whether they agreed to continue with Puerto Rico's territorial status and (2) to indicate the political status they preferred from three possibilities: statehood, independence, or a sovereign nation in free association with the United States. Voters who chose "No" to the first question numbered 970,910 (54.0%), expressing themselves against continuing the current political status, while those who voted "Yes" numbered 828,077 (46.0%), indicating their desire to continue the current political status relationship. Of those who answered the second question, 834,191 (61.2%) chose statehood, 454,768 (33.3%) chose free association, and 74,895 (5.5%) chose independence. The preferred status consultation did not include Puerto Rico's current status as a territory (Estado Libre Asociado as defined by the 1952 Constitution) as a choice, but instead an alternative named "E.L.A. Soberano" On December 11, 2012, the Legislative Assembly of Puerto Rico enacted a concurrent resolution requesting the President and the Congress of the United States to respond diligently and effectively on the demand of the people of Puerto Rico to end its current political status and to begin the transition of Puerto Rico to become a state of the union. This was followed by a hearing at the Senate Energy and Natural Resources Committee on Puerto Rico's status on August 1, 2013, and (in 2014) resolutions introduced in both houses of the United States Congress (H.R. 2000; S. 2020) to hold a yes-or-no referendum among the residents of Puerto Rico on statehood. Both resolutions died in committee.

=== 2017 referendum ===
Because there were almost 500,000 blank ballots in the 2012 referendum, creating confusion as to the voters' true desire, Congress ignored the results, but passed a budget bill which included $2.5M in funding for a future referendum, intended to help educate the population on any future plebiscite. The fifth referendum was held on June 11, 2017, and offered voters three options: "Statehood", "Free Association/Independence" and "Current Territorial Status". The turnout was only 23% because statehood opponents boycotted it, arguing that the ballot language was biased towards pro-statehood. Some would later try to attribute the boycott to the PPD party, citing its support for the status quo. Of the voters who "participated", 97.18% chose statehood, 1.50% favored independence and 1.32% chose to maintain the commonwealth status.

==== Criticism ====
The June 2017 referendum was, according to The New York Times, a "flawed election" where the turnout was only 23%, in part because most statehood opponents sat out. 97% of votes cast favored statehood. The November 2020 referendum was the first to ask voters a simple yes-or-no question: "Should Puerto Rico be admitted immediately into the Union as a State?". There were 655,505 votes in favor of statehood (52.52%) and 592,671 votes opposed (47.48%), with a turnout of 1,248,476 voters out of the total population stated by census Population Estimates of 3,221,789 as of July 1, 2022.

Although the two referendums (November 2012 and June 2017) also had ostensibly pro-statehood outcomes, The New York Times described them as "marred, with ballot language phrased to favor the party in office". For example, the fourth referendum, held in November 2012, asked voters (1) whether they wanted to maintain the current political status of Puerto Rico and, if not, (2) which alternative status they prefer. Of the fifty-four percent (54.0%) who voted "No" on maintaining the status quo, 61.11% chose statehood, 33.34% chose free association, and 5.55% chose independence.

=== 2018 Puerto Rico Admission Act (H.R. 6246) ===
In 2018, the 2018 Puerto Rico Admission Act was introduced to the United States Congress by Jenniffer González-Colón, and had 34 co-sponsors. It would have mandated Puerto Rico becoming a state of the Union by start of 2021.

=== Puerto Rico Statehood Admission Act (H.R. 4901) ===
A bill (H.R. 4901) for Puerto Ricans to vote "yes" or "no" on statehood was introduced on October 29, 2019, by Puerto Rico Resident Commissioner Jenniffer González Colón, but died in Committee. A corresponding bill in the Legislative Assembly of Puerto Rico that would implement the vote, known in English as the Law for the Final Definition of the Political Status of Puerto Rico (P.S. 1467), was approved by both houses on March 31, 2020, and sent to the Governor for signature. The single question was "Should Puerto Rico be immediately admitted into the Union as a state?", with only two options: "yes" or "no".

=== 2020 referendum ===
2020 Puerto Rican status referendum
- November 3, 2020
- Should Puerto Rico be admitted immediately into the Union as a State?

Results
Choice	Votes	%
Yes	655,505	52.52%
No	592,671	47.48%
Valid votes	1,248,176	96.82%
Invalid or blank votes	40,959	3.18%
Total votes	1,289,135	100.00%
Registered voters/turnout	2,355,894	54.72%
- Results by municipality

On May 16, 2020, Governor Wanda Vázquez Garced announced that a referendum on Puerto Rico's statehood would be held in November of that year. For the first time in the territory's history, only one direct question was asked: "Should Puerto Rico be admitted immediately into the Union as a State?" Previous referendums presented multiple options such as independence or maintaining the current territorial status. The announcement came amid growing disillusionment with Puerto Rico's territorial status due to the lack of access to federal funds for recent natural disasters, such as Hurricane Maria and the COVID-19 pandemic.

The referendum was held on November 3, 2020. There were 655,505 votes in favor of statehood (52.52%) and 592,671 against (47.48%). After the results, the Puerto Rico Legislature, which at the time had a pro-statehood majority, passed the "Puerto Rico Congressional Act" calling a special election to elect two shadow senators and four shadow House-members to Washington D.C. to advocate for statehood. In the US House of Representatives, a bill to provide for the admission of the State of Puerto Rico into the Union was introduced. These bills, H.R. 1522 and S. 780, were supported by 50 Puerto Rican pro-statehood organizations, who "[called] on the House Committee on Natural Resources and the Senate Committee on Energy and Natural Resources to approve that legislation."

=== Puerto Rico Status Act (H.R. 8393) Passes House ===
On December 15, 2022, H.R. 8393 passed the House of Representatives in a 233–191 vote with 11 absences. It would have instituted a binding referendum that would allow Puerto Ricans to vote on the future status of the island, that Congress would have to obey. Every Democrat voted in favor of the bill, as did 16 Republicans. (Note: Don Bacon, Liz Cheney, Rodney Davis, Brian Fitzpatrick, Mayra Flores, Andrew Garbarino, Anthony Gonzalez, Jaime Herrera Beutler, Bill Huizenga, David Joyce, John Katko, Dan Newhouse, Bill Posey, María Elvira Salazar, Lloyd Smucker, and Fred Upton.) The bill died in the Senate. In April 2023, Puerto Rico's Status Act, which seeks to resolve its territorial status and relationship with the United States through a binding plebiscite at the federal level, was reintroduced in the House by Democrats. This legislation, however, has been viewed as biased in favor of incorporating Puerto Rico as a state due to its introducers being pro-State for Puerto Rico.

In September 2023, Senator Roger Wicker introduced legislation under the same title which, if passed, would schedule a first vote for August 4, 2024, where Puerto Ricans would have the choice between four alternatives: annexation to the United States, independence, sovereignty in free association, and a free state associated with the United States.

In December 2023, Senator Martin Heinrich introduced another act by the same name which, if passed, would also schedule a binding referendum.

=== 2024 referendum ===
2024 Puerto Rican status referendum
- November 5, 2024

Results
Statehood	58.61%
Free association	29.57%
Independence	11.82%
- Results by municipality Statehood: 60–70% 50–60% 40–50%

In July 2024, Governor Pedro Pierluisi called a plebiscite on the status of Puerto Rico in November 2024; for the first time the island's current status as a U.S. territory was not an option during the non-binding plebiscite. The executive order followed the U.S. House of Representatives' 2022 approval of a bill to help Puerto Rico move toward a change in territorial status. Voters were given the choice of statehood, independence, or independence with free association, the terms of which would be negotiated regarding foreign affairs, U.S. citizenship, and use of the U.S. dollar. The Popular Democratic Party called for a blank vote for not including the Commonwealth or the current system.

In the November 5 referendum, the top choice was statehood which garnered 59% of valid votes and 49% of all votes.

== Support outside Puerto Rico ==
In 1982, Ronald Reagan announced his belief that the statehood would benefit the United States and Puerto Rico, but also that he supported the Puerto Ricans' right to self-determination. He rejected outside influences on the process, saying that it should be a matter between the United States and Puerto Rico.

Support for Puerto Rican statehood has been expressed by former presidents George H. W. Bush, George W. Bush, Barack Obama, and Joe Biden, as well as Massachusetts governor and U.S. senator Mitt Romney, former U.S. Representative Don Young, U.S. Representative Steny Hoyer, former U.S. Representative Stephanie Murphy, U.S. Representative Darren Soto, former Florida governor and U.S. Representative Charlie Crist, former Florida governor (now U.S. Senator) Rick Scott, former U.S. Senator (now U.S. Secretary of State) Marco Rubio, former Florida governor Jeb Bush, U.S. Virgin Islands Governor Albert Bryan, and American Samoa Delegate to Congress Amata Coleman Radewagen. Former Senator and Presidential Candidate, Bob Dole, strongly supported a vote for Puerto Rican statehood.

Florida governor Ron DeSantis has been in favor of Puerto Rican statehood, and also helped co-sponsor the 2018 Puerto Rican Admission Act.

A poll of over 7,200 in 2024 found that nearly 60% of Americans support statehood for Puerto Rico.

== Opposition outside Puerto Rico ==
During the 2012 Republican Party presidential primaries for the presidential election of that year, former senator Rick Santorum affirmed that he would only support Puerto Rican statehood if the population of the island began to use English as its main language.

Senate Republican Leader Mitch McConnell said in an interview in 2019 that he was against Puerto Rican statehood, as he felt they would vote Democratic and result in two more Democratic senators in Congress, and with D.C. statehood would mean four total. In context, he tied the issue with opposing their overall agenda, which included D.C. statehood and other changes. His words, part of a longer statement, were, "They plan to make the District of Columbia a state, that would give them two new Democratic senators, Puerto Rico a state, we give them two more Democratic senators. As long as I'm the majority leader of the Senate none of that stuff is going anywhere." He reaffirmed that he was against adding states, because they vote Democratic, and in the 2024 election Puerto Rico voted 73.4% for Kamala Harris and 26.6% for Donald Trump. McConnell stepped down from Leader at the end of 2024, and Senator John Thune took his place, pledging to support Trump policies.

In a November 10, 2020, interview, then-Democratic Senator Joe Manchin of West Virginia, said that he did not "see the need for the D.C. statehood with the type of services that we're getting in D.C. right now" but on Puerto Rico statehood, Manchin said that he opposed it but was open to discussion.

A poll of over 7,200 in 2024 found about 16% of Americans opposed statehood for Puerto Rico.

=== Puerto Rico and Donald Trump ===
In 2016, Donald Trump made the following statement on Puerto Rico's future: "There are 3.7 million American citizens living in Puerto Rico. As citizens, they should be entitled to determine for themselves their political status. I am firmly committed to the process where Puerto Ricans might resolve their status according to Constitutional and Congressional protocols. I believe the people of Puerto Rico deserve a process of status self-determination that gives them a fair and unambiguous choice on this matter. As president I will do my part to insure that Congress follows the Constitution. The will of the Puerto Rican people in any status referendum should be considered as Congress follows through on any desired change in status for Puerto Rico, including statehood."

In 2018, as president, Trump stated his opposition at that time to statehood, saying that he would refuse to allow it if any serving Puerto Rico politicians who criticized him, such as the Mayor of San Juan (the capital city), remained in office.

The then-Governor of Puerto Rico, Ricardo Rosselló, responded by saying “The president said he is not in favor of statehood for the people of Puerto Rico based on a personal feud with a local mayor. This is an insensitive, disrespectful comment to over 3 million Americans who live in the U.S. territory of Puerto Rico”.

There was media speculation that racist jokes about Puerto Rico and Latino voters, made by roast comedian Tony Hinchcliffe at a Donald Trump presidential election rally in New York's Madison Square Garden in October 2024, could have pushed Puerto Rico's population to vote for statehood in its 2024 Status Referendum, on November 5. The comedian has a long history of making offensive jokes for comedic roast, and was later defended by Jon Stewart. Overall, the jokes were condemned as not being appropriate to a political rally. The candidate stated they did not know who the comedian was or who had hired him for the political rally when asked, and the campaign issued a statement, "This joke does not reflect the views of President Trump or the campaign." President Biden further condemned the remarks and praised Puerto Rican people, though the exact wording of remarks triggered a nationwide debate over the president's remarks, especially regarding an apostrophe in the transcript.

In November 2024, Trump picked Florida Senator Marco Rubio to be Secretary of State, someone who had previously endorsed resolutions for Puerto Rico and pushed for increased tax credits for low-income families there.

== Statehood supporters ==
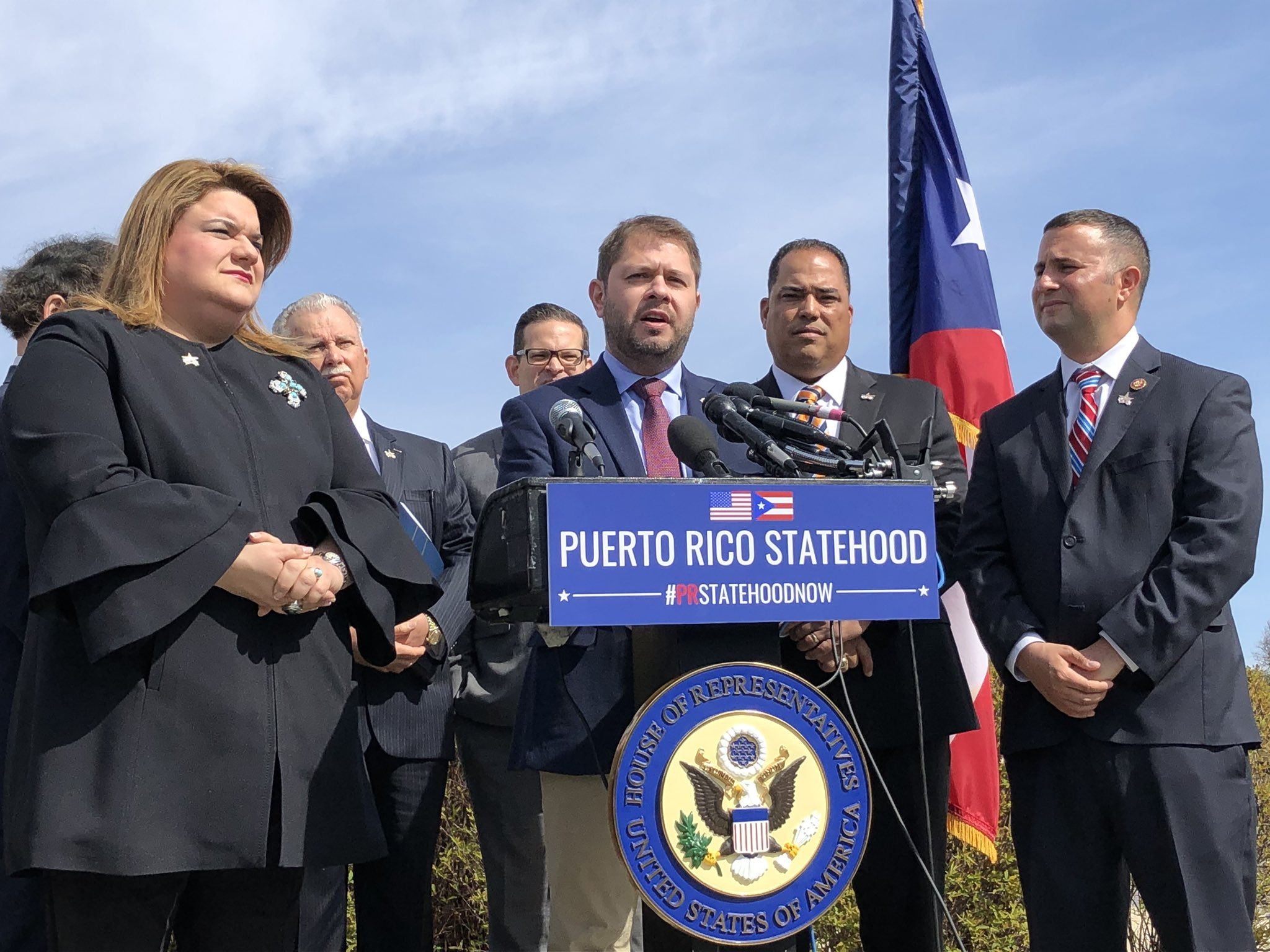
Congressman Ruben Gallego speaking in support of Puerto Rican statehood in 2019

The Taking of Congress (Spanish: Toma del Congreso) was an event that started on January 15, 2013, in the United States Capitol in which more than 130 private citizens from different advocacy groups in Puerto Rico started a campaign in which they visited every member of the United States Congress in order to speak about the results of the 2012 Puerto Rican status referendum—in which a majority of voters expressed themselves against the current political status of Puerto Rico. They also attempted to persuade the members of Congress to initiate a process to change Puerto Rico's political status. The campaign was supported by former U.S. representative José Enrique Serrano and former Resident Commissioner of Puerto Rico (later Governor) Pedro Pierluisi. Groups involved included Alianza Pro Libre Asociación Soberana (ALAS), Boricua Ahora Es, Igualdad Futuro Seguro, Renacer Ideológico Estadista (RIE), Proyecto Estrella, Young Democrats of America, and Young Republican Federation of Puerto Rico.

== See also ==
- 51st state
- Federal voting rights in Puerto Rico
- Hawaii Admission Act, the most recent law admitting a new US state (1959)
- Political status of Puerto Rico
- Politics of Puerto Rico
- Proposed political status for Puerto Rico
- Puerto Rican citizenship and nationality
- Puerto Rico Democracy Act, bill introduced in Congress in 2007 and 2009
- Sovereigntism (Puerto Rico)
- Special Committee on Decolonization
- Territories of the United States
- United Nations list of non-self-governing territories
