= Alianza Puertorriqueña =

Political party of Puerto Rico

Alianza Puertorriqueña was a major political party in Puerto Rico.

The party was founded in 1924 by the union of the liberal wing of the Republican Party and the Union of Puerto Rico advocating for more unity amongst people from different ideologies for the benefit of Puerto Rico. This proclaim was headed by Antonio R. Barceló, from the Union Party and President of the Senate of Puerto Rico, Jose Tous Soto and José Celso Barbosa, from the Republican Party.

The union of the parties led to a massive victory at the 1924 general elections with the victory of most of its candidates. However, as the years progressed, the people became more disillusioned with the results and the party lost support. At the 1928 elections, the Alianza still had a victory, but not as wide as its previous one.

By the 1932 general elections, the party had already disappeared.

== Sources ==
- Coaliciones, alianzas, y uniones entre las colectividades (1896-1945) by CECANGPR
- Entre 1920 y 1924 on Pomarrosas
