= Coalition (Puerto Rico) =

Electoral alliance in Puerto Rico

The Coalition (Spanish: Coalición) was an electoral alliance in Puerto Rico.

The Coalition was formed in 1924, composed of Partido Republicano Puro and the Socialist Party. It was generally in favor of statehood. It held a majority in the island's legislature from 1932 to 1940.
