= Union of Puerto Rico =

Political party in Puerto Rico

The Union of Puerto Rico (Spanish: Unión de Puerto Rico, UPR), also known as the Unionist Party (Spanish: Partido Unionista, PU), was a major political party in Puerto Rico in the early 20th century. The Union of Puerto Rico was known as the dominant political party of the island from 1904 to 1932. UPR founder Luis Muñoz Rivera also founded La Democracia, which effectively acted as the UPR publication. On 19 February 1904, the Union of Puerto Rico party became the first mass party to advocate for independence for Puerto Rico in the form of a sovereign nation.

== Founding ==
Union of Puerto Rico was founded in February 1902 by Luis Muñoz Rivera, Rosendo Matienzo Cintrón, Antonio R. Barceló, José de Diego, Juan Vías Ochoteco and others after the disbanding of the Federal Party following the party's withdrawal in the election of 1900. The party formed under a platform of greater autonomy for Puerto Rico as a result of the group's dissatisfaction, and frustration, with the Foraker Act.

== Platform ==
=== Autonomy ===
The UPR, initially, had a platform that pushed for the separation of the cabinet and legislature, for Puerto Ricans to have more cabinet positions, for a less powerful governor and the governor's appointments in hopes that Puerto Ricans could have more influence and participation within their own government.

=== Jones Act and Realignment ===
From 1913 to 1915 Luis Muñoz Rivera attempted to amend the Jones Act, during its creation, in order to incorporate Puerto Rican autonomy into the act. Rivera attempted to reform the acts incorporation of aspects similar to the older Olmstead Act, especially aspects of United States civil government. Muñoz's campaign for amendments to the eventual Jones act was systemic from the fact he viewed it as "ultra-conservative", and wanted to try and realize Puerto Rican autonomy.

The most divisive aspect of the Jones act was United States citizenship for Puerto Ricans. Both Muñoz, and the UPR delegates in Washington opposed Puerto Rican-U.S. Citizenship. Muñoz, in February 1914, introduced his own bill for the continuation of Puerto Rican citizenship- supported by the UPR delegates. However, dejected, the UPR delegates eventually chose to accept the provision "of individual citizenship outlined in the Shafroth bill".

Muñoz's patience and diligence regarding the tentative Jones Bill, was challenged by the radical Jose De Diego (another UPR leader) who sought quick resolution for Puerto Rican independence. This division regarding ideology within the party came to be resolved at the UPR convention, in 1915. The party, according to Munoz, came to the conclusion that;

The Unionist party . . . by a vote of 106 against 35 resolved to follow a policy entirely along the lines of self-government. The party shall confine its activities to demanding home rule leaving the independence plank in its platform simply as an ideal until some future convention shall determine the date on which the said plank shall be considered a party issue…

Following the death of Munoz, in 1916, this new platform became permanent, as Munoz's death created poignancy regarding his final public goal for the UPR. The party, thusly, began to take a more conservative platform regarding Puerto Rican autonomy. Eventually, in 1920, the party would even work for the expansion of the Jones Act in order to maintain United States relations that they hoped could guarantee eventual Puerto Rican autonomy.

== Dissent ==
In 1913 a small pro-independence faction (known as the independistas) occurs with José de Diego as a response to the Jones Act. While one of the earliest examples of dissent within the party, de Diego subsequently accepted the Jones Act (in line with his party) in order to retain his position within the legislature.

Various members of the party felt that the Union Party was not doing enough for the cause of Puerto Rican independence. In 1919, José Coll y Cuchí quit the party and with his followers founded Asociación Nacionalista de Puerto Rico (English: Nationalist Association) in San Juan. The Nationalist Association had a youth group called the Juventud Nacionalista (English: Nationalist Youth) which was at that time presided over by José Paniagua. The Nationalist Youth was then composed of students from the University of Puerto Rico and high school students.

Other high-ranking members who also felt as Coll y Cuchí and quit the party were Dr. Leopoldo Figueroa, José S. Alegría (father of Ricardo Alegría) and Eugenio Font Suárez, co-founded the Independence Association of Puerto Rico (Asociación Independentista).

== Birth of the Puerto Rican Nationalist Party ==
On September 17, 1922, the Independence Association merged with Coll y Cuchí's Nationalist Association of Puerto Rico and the Nationalist Youth (Juventud Nacionalista) political organizations to form the Puerto Rican Nationalist Party.

== Reorganization ==
In 1921 President Harding appointed E. Mont Reily as governor of Puerto Rico. While the UPR had historically been amicable with Puerto Rican Governors, Reily retaliated against the UPR as their platform was one of Puerto Rican independence. Facing new political pushback, that included members of the UPR no longer being appointed to government positions, the UPR completely removed Puerto Rican independence from their platform and instead campaigned for an Estado Libre Asociado (English: Free Associated State) on February 11, 1922. The ELA would have effectively allowed Puerto Ricans to be elected as their own governors, by extending U.S. citizenship, and would have removed Reily from office as a result.

The ELA, and change in platform, drew criticism as being bourgeois especially from more radical factions within the UPR- this faction created the Puerto Rican Nationalist Party.

=== Formation of Alianza ===
In 1924, the Union Party joined with dissident members of the Republican Party to form the Alianza (English: Alliance), a political coalition. In elections, both parties would be on the ballot but their individual votes would be combined as one coalition. Criticism by the more liberal faction of the Puerto Rican Republican Party, and Socialist Party in 1920 regarding Puerto Rico's status lead to the eventual formation of Coalicion. With the growing influence, and organization, of radical parties caused concern within the UPR. The more liberal factions became more popular with the male laboring class. Similar concerns for the UPR arose with female suffrage, achieved in 1924. The response was the creation of Alianza.

=== Liberal Party ===
In 1932, the Alianza reconstituted itself as the Liberal Party and formally endorsed independence. The Alianza's more conservative, pro-statehood, faction broke off and joined with the Republicans to form the Republican Union.

== Demise ==
In 1920, after the UPR changed their platform for the expansion of the Jones Act, the UPR experienced criticism by the pro-independence faction of the Puerto Rican Republican Party and the Socialist Party for creating new uncertainty regarding the island's status.

Fuerza Viva, the farmers association at the time, became especially critical of the UPR as their rhetoric began to emphasis greater foreign economic relations. Fuerza Viva, as a result, began to criticize the UPR and in 1926 began an attack against UPR leader Antonio R. Barcelo. Barcelo was accused of being a socialist by Fuerza Viva.

Throughout the 1920s, while remaining the dominant political party of the island, the UPR experienced a loss of popularity as their image (especially after the formation of the Alianza) because associated with being bourgeois, and politically conservative.
