= José S. Alegría =

Puerto Rican poet, writer, lawyer, and independence advocate

- Born: July 17, 1886; Dorado, Puerto Rico
- Died: July 29, 1965 (aged 79); Santurce, Puerto Rico
- Political party: Puerto Rican Nationalist Party
- Movement: Puerto Rican Independence
- Children: Ricardo Alegría

José S. Alegría (July 17, 1886 – July 29, 1965) was a poet. Alegría was a founding member of the Puerto Rican Nationalist Party and president of the political organization from 1928 to 1930. He was interested in the visual arts and learned some painting techniques from Puerto Rican artist Francisco Oller and from Fernando Díaz Mckenna. He is the father of Ricardo Alegría (1921 – 2011) a scholar, cultural anthropologist and archeologist known as the "Father of Modern Puerto Rican Archaeology".

During the 1930s, Alegría presided over the Casino of Puerto Rico. From 1938 to 1949, he was the director of the magazine "Puerto Rico Illustrado", there he published some of his poems under the name of Raimundo Lucio. He served this role for eleven years, 1938–49. Alegría also served as the president of the Sociedad Puertorriqueña de Periodistas (1943–45), a journalism organization.

== Early years ==
Alegría was born at the municipality of Dorado to Cruz Alegría Arizmendi and Carmen Santos. His father was a former soldier from Guipuzcoa that had settled and become a merchant, serving as mayor of Dorado twice during the Spanish regime. . Unlike his father, Alegría was distinctly liberal since his youth, as exemplified when he lamented the death of Antonio Maceo in 1896 while the rest of his class was oblivious to the significance of the event. He would complete his education between Dorado, Barceloneta and Manatí.

In 1901, he earned a teachers certificate in the "Normal" category, working as such for a brieft time. Alegría became interested in politics at a young age and when he was 16 years old, he founded the Federal Youth Committee of the Federal Party in the town of Barceloneta. The municipal assembly offered him a grant to study law abroad. His family sent him to the United States to continue his college education. He attended Valparaiso University, in Indiana and in 1908 earned his law degree. There he established a small source of income source by selling Puerto Rican cigars. Among the students at the university, Alegría was a distinguished student and considered a leader by other Puerto Ricans such as Francisco Delgado and gained nicknames such as "His Excellency" or "Mr. Allegro" from the Anglo students.

== Political career ==
When he returned to Puerto Rico, he joined the Union Party of Puerto Rico. The Union Party was founded in February 1904 by Luis Muñoz Rivera, Rosendo Matienzo Cintrón, Antonio R. Barceló, José de Diego and others after the disbanding of the Federal Party. The party supported greater self-government for the island, though the party was divided between those in favor of independence and those favoring statehood. The party was highly successful electorally through the 1930s. Alegría participated in organizing the party's committee at Manatí.

Alegría was named municipal judge of the town of Salinas. He also served as the municipal judge of the towns of Santa Isabel and Manatí in different occasions. Relocating to San Juan afterwards, Alegría was known for having a daily routine that saw him traverse the city on a regular basis, making stops to purchase a number of things from the newspaper and books to clothing and hats at defunct establishments like Joyería Bouret or La Primavera. He would frequently hold reunions with other professionals at places such La Mallorquina, with stops at the Banco Territorial or Colonial American Bank marking his afternoons. Alegría would work as a lawyer at Central Plazuela and at his personal office would work under the, by then obsolete, Spanish hours. Generally sociable and interested in a number of topics such as arts and other such amenities, he never thrived economically as a lawyer but his clients (such as Eduardo Georgetti) were generous with their gifts, which allowed him time to get involved in a number of whims.

After Luis Muñoz Rivera died in 1917 and his successor Antonio Rafael Barceló distanced the Union Party from the ideal of Puerto Rican independence, Alegría became increasingly frustrated by this. In 1919, José Coll y Cuchí, a member of the Union Party, felt that the party was not doing enough for the cause of Puerto Rican independence and with his followers founded the Nationalist Association of Puerto Rico in San Juan. By the 1920s there were two other pro-independence organizations in the Island: the Nationalist Youth and the Independence Association of Puerto Rico. The Independence Association was founded by Alegría, Eugenio Font Suárez and Dr. Leopoldo Figueroa in 1920.

On September 17, 1922, these three political organizations joined forces and formed the Puerto Rican Nationalist Party and Coll y Cuchi was elected president. Alegría followed Coll y Cuchi and was elected vice-president. In 1924, Dr. Pedro Albizu Campos joined the party and was also named vice-president. In 1927, Alegría participated in the unveiling of a monument to commemorate the CGrito de Lares. By 1930, disagreements between Coll y Cuchi and Albizu Campos as to how the party should be run, led the former and his followers to abandon the party and return to the Union Party. Alegría was named party president in 1928 and held that position until 1930. On May 11, 1930, Dr. Pedro Albizu Campos was elected president of the Puerto Rican Nationalist Party. The new president proposed to the young lawyer to travel throughout Latin American seeking support for independence.

In 1932, Alegría joined the Liberal Party of Puerto Rico, a pro-independence political party. His change in affiliation was the product of his interest in socioeconomic reforms, which he considered essential. In 1936, he was elected to the House of Representatives in the Puerto Rican legislature and served in that position until 1940. Alegría was a conservationist that as a representative assigned a fund to restore the Teatro Tapia, which he also defended when its demolition was proposed. He also opposed the demolition of a chapel known as Capilla del Cristo, which he defended along several of San Juan residents.

== Arts ==
His stay as a judge at Manatí awoke in him an interest in poetry, joining a group of bards in the area. Alegría would later publish his work in the book Rosas y flechas. This marked another facet of his interest in the arts, having also studied under painter Francisco Oller. Alegría also became one of the first collectors of Puerto Rican art, purchasing the work of Oller and José Campeche. After Fernando Díaz McKenna relocated to Puerto Rico in 1913, he studied under him as well. In 1918, Alegría and Evaristo Ribera Chevremont published Antología de los poetas jóvenes de Puerto Rico, a poetry compendium of poets from Manatí. In 1919, he exposed a painting named El Jardín Rosa for the Ateneo Puertorriqueño, for which he received an award. In 1923, he began publishing the Visa moderna magazine, which lasted two years and featured Art Deco covers.

In 1935, Alegría was elected president of the Casino de Puerto Rico. In his role as president, he actively organized several festivals and allowed the use of his house towards this end. Alegría also made arrangements to expand the inclusion of the arts as part of the institution's curriculum, even writing painting the piece La Trulla and writing the zarzuela La Cenicienta for the Club Artístico del Casino de Puerto Rico. He tried convincing the Casino that a terrain at Isla Verde could be converted in a beach house/sports center, something that was declined but ultimately became a reality when the area was developed years later. As the locale served as the epicenter of activity for a number of influential families, Alegría created the concept of the "Social Friday" at the casino, which has persisted in the Puerto Rican popular culture to this day. He also created an internal magazine, named Casino. Alegría ceased his office as president of the Casino de Puerto Rico in 1937.

In 1938, Alegría became the director of Puerto Rico Ilustrado, for which he had written about cultural topics such as a variety of dances, and began a move to focus on local news and authors. For this publication he wrote a series of parodic articles as part of the "Cartas a Florinda" series in which city and rural life were contrasted, to write these he employed pseudonyms like Raimundo Lucio or Tristán el sordo. These would reflect a socially conservative and melancholic persona that disliked divorce and was concerned that continuous construction would remove San Juan's distinctiveness, which was also skeptical of the effect that the proliferation of professional women would have on the nuclear family. The articles were later compiled in Crónicas frívolas y Cartas a Florinda. Alegría also used the pages of Puerto Rico Ilustrado to argue against the proposed demolition of Teatro Tapia.

Among his written works are the following:

- "Antología de poetas jóvenes de Puerto Rico" (Anthology of young poets of Puerto Rico) (1918) - Along Evaristo Ribera Chevremont.
- "Crónicas frívolas" (Frivolous Chronics) (1938)
- "Retablos de la aldea" (Altarpieces of the village) (1949)
- "El alma de la aldea" (The soul of a village) (1956)
- "Cartas a Florinda" (Letters to Florinda) (1958)
- "Rosas y flechas" (Roses and arrows) (1958)

He also authored poems Sirenas de Cristal, Pasión de Ensueño and Romería de Recuerdos. These along Primaveral and Nuestras Nupcias were published in Puerto Rico Illustrado and books like Poesia Puertorriqueña. Alegría focused his work around Puerto Rican scenes and traditions.

== Later years ==
In 1938, the family would relocate to a loaned house at Avenida De Diego at the urging of their elder son. In 1940, Celeste and Elisa purchased a house at Calle del Parque in Santurce, Puerto Rico, after the latter sold her part to the couple, they repaired it and eventually settled in. In 1947, they sold it to their children, who preserved the building. Until his death on July 29, 1965, Alegría remained close with Celeste, with whom he always tried to share his meals. He would also hold family reunions at the Del Parque house on Sundays.

When Ricardo graduated from Central High, but lacked four mandatory English classes and had a lackluster average, the university did not accept him. Instead, Alegría sent his son to the Instituto Politécnico in the municipality of San Germán, Puerto Rico. The youngster was frustrated with the environment and was expelled after only one semester, due to persistent pranks. Alegría then incorporated his son to the staff of Puerto Rico Ilustrado for six months. In 1943, Alegría became the president of the Puerto Rican Society of Journalists, serving the role for two years. He left the role of president in 1945. Alegría was also a member of the local history and language academies. As his son gained prominence as an archeologist, Alegría would poke fun at his findings by claiming that "[Ricardo] invented the Taíno", a tongue-in-cheek reference at the lack of previous research on the topic.

When Luis Muñoz Marín swore in as governor of Puerto Rico, he elaborated a piece discussing how the three generations of that family had been ideologically different from each other. In 1949, Alegría left his work at Puerto Rico Ilustrado after a dispute with president Ángel Ramos over a segment that he considered was disrespectful towards Inés Mendoza. That same year, his book Retablos de la aldea received an award from the Institute of Literature. El alma de la aldea also followed the traditional style used in the former. He served as columnist at El Diario de Puerto Rico with "¡Que cosas!". Despite quitting Puerto Rico Ilustrado, Alegría would still write the occasional article for it.

While Ricardo was studying abroad, Alegría would write him letters and offer counsel. By 1952, he had begun noticing health issues, in particular with his heart. In 1963, Alegría created the Puerto Rican Society of Authors and served as its president. He would also serve as President of the Parole Board. Alegría was also the President of the Puerto Rican Institute of Hispanic Culture. He was bestowed with the Order of Isabel the Catholic in recognition of his contributions to the institute.

Alegría died in his home in San Juan and is buried at Santa María Magdalena de Pazzis Cemetery, located just outside the city walls of Old San Juan. The city of Dorado honored his memory by naming a high school, Jose S. Alegria High School, after him. After his death, Ricardo preserved a painting of his father done by Carlos Marichal at his library. Years later, after leading the Institute of Puerto Rican Culture in the restoration of San Juan, Ricardo noted that he had recycled some of Alegría's failed projects from his time as representative.

== Personal life ==
In 1913, Alegría attended a party held at La Fortaleza, where he first met the family of Canóvanas mayor Luis Hernáiz Veronne, taking particular interest in his half-sister, Celeste Gallardo. With the help of a mutual friend, physician Despiau, he invited her to a dance. An accidental faux pas involving her mother, Estefania Veronne, and an invitation to another informal dance, ended their first meeting. However, Alegría insisted and would travel between Manatí and San Juan and visit the house of the Gallardo family with the only intent of inviting her to social activities. The couple got married on July 9, 1914. Two years later, they would relocate to a seven-room house property of the Gallardo family at San Juan, the same in which they were first married at San Francisco street No. 409. Alegría was satisfied with the building, in particular due to its oceanside site.

The couple had four children, José Esteban (1916), María Antonieta (1917), Félix Luis (1918) and Ricardo (1921), which were delivered in the house. Alegría also had another son, Gilberto, from another relationship. Figures known in the public imaginarium such as Albizu Campos, Antonio S. Pedreira, Felisa Rincón de Gautier, Lidio Cruz Monclova, Luis Biamón and Rafael López Sicardo would mingle at his law office or the family's house. An avid reader, he built a private library that reflected a number of his interests like Puerto Rican literature, history, journalism, law and the arts. His copy of El Tesoro de la Juventud would fuel Ricardo's future passion for archeology. After being elected Representative, Alegría wrote the Smithsonian Institution so they would send publications to his son. His reputation granted his children free access to cultural activities, further fueling their own interests. At San Juan, Aegría and his wife would visit the Luna theater with frequency, taking the young Ricardo with them.

Alegría continued being an independentist throughout his life, keeping a painting of Ramón Emeterio Betances as the centerpiece of his library. His son, Ricardo, inherited this belief and since his youth would express it by boycotting the pledge of allegiance at his school. Alegría would intervene on his behalf, but not chastise his son, even proposing that he dressed as Patrick Henry as a pro-independence message when children were told to dress as a Founding Father for an activity. He openly opposed the government's Americanization effort and sabotaged it by providing his children with books from his collection, but despite this collaborated with the schools as offering resources such as an intercom. When Ricardo became interested in biology, Alegría purchased a used microscope to foster this interest.

== See also ==
- List of Puerto Ricans
- Puerto Rican Nationalist Party
- History of Puerto Rico
