= 1902 Puerto Rican general election =

1902 Puerto Rico elections
- November 4, 1902

General elections were held in Puerto Rico in 1902. Federico Degetau, who favored Puerto Rican statehood, was re-elected as Resident Commissioner. These elections did not determine the island's governor, who served at the pleasure of the president until the election of Luis Muñoz Marín in 1948. Given Puerto Rico's householder franchise system, only propertied men above the age of 21 were able to participate.

== Results ==
=== Resident Commissioner ===
Candidate	Party	Votes	%
Federico Degetau	Republican Party	73,823	68.08
Felipe Cuebas y Arredondo	Federal Party	34,605	31.92
Total		108,428	100.00
Source: Nolla
