= 1900 Puerto Rican general election =

1900 Puerto Rico elections
- November 6, 1900

General elections were held in Puerto Rico on November 6, 1900. These were the first elections after the United States annexed the territory from Spain following the Spanish–American War in 1898. There were no direct elections to the office of Governor of Puerto Rico (held by Charles Herbert Allen), who was appointed directly by the President of the United States.

== Background ==
The elections were held under the Foraker Act, a U.S. federal law that established the first civilian government on the island after the change of sovereignty. The elective offices in the elections included the 35 seats in the House of Delegates, the lower house of the island's legislature, the Resident Commissioner (an elected figure who represented Puerto Rico in the United States House of Representatives without the right to vote), mayors, boards of councils, school commissioners and road supervisors.

The Foraker Act stipulated that the executive branch, represented by the Governor of Puerto Rico, the Senate, the Executive Council and the judiciary would be appointed by the President of the United States, with the notice and consent of the United States Senate.

The Executive Council composed of six Americans and five Puerto Ricans determined the electoral rules.

Suffrage was denied to women, and only men over 21 who paid government contributions or who were literate were granted the right to vote.

== Results ==
The Federal Party boycotted the elections and called for voters to abstain from voting, which resulted in a landslide victory for the Republican Party, with Federico Degetau being elected Resident Commissioner with 99.75% of the vote, defeating Manuel R. Gatell of the Federal Party, which only received 0.25% of the vote.

=== Resident Commissioner ===
Candidate	Party	Votes	%
Federico Degetau	Republican Party	58,297	99.75
Manuel R. Gatell	Federal Party	148	0.25
Total		58,445	100.00
Source: Nolla

=== House of Delegates ===
Party	Votes	%	Seats
Republican Party	291,358	99.79	35
Federal Party	617	0.21	0
Total	291,975	100.00	35
Source: Nolla
