= 1904 Puerto Rican general election =

1904 Puerto Rico elections
- November 8, 1904

General elections were held in Puerto Rico in 1904. Tulio Larrínaga was elected as Resident Commissioner, defeating the incumbent Federico Degetau.

== Results ==
=== Resident Commissioner ===
| Candidate | Party | Votes | % |
|---|---|---|---|
| Tulio Larrínaga | Union of Puerto Rico | 89,182 | 62.43 |
| Federico Degetau | Republican Party | 53,674 | 37.57 |
| Total | | 142,856 | 100.00 |
Source: Nolla
