= Leopoldo Figueroa =

Puerto Rican politician

Leopoldo Figueroa Carreras
- Cámara de Representantes de Puerto Rico

Member of the Puerto Rico House of Representatives from the 4 Bayamón-Cataño-Guaynabo district
- In office 1933–1944

Personal details
- Born: September 21, 1887 San Juan, Puerto Rico
- Died: October 15, 1969 (aged 82) San Juan, Puerto Rico
- Party: Republican Union; New Progressive Party; Republican Party
- Spouse: Carmen Vazquez Rivera
- Education: University of Havana; University of Puerto Rico School of Law (JD)
- Profession: Politician; journalist; medical doctor; lawyer
- Note: Figueroa co-founded the Independence Association, which later merged with two other political organizations to form the Puerto Rican Nationalist Party

Leopoldo Figueroa (September 21, 1887 – October 15, 1969), also known as "The deacon of the Puerto Rican Legislature", was a Puerto Rican politician, journalist, medical doctor and lawyer. Figueroa, who began his political career as an advocate of Puerto Rican Independence, was the co-founder of the Independence Association of Puerto Rico, one of three political organizations which merged to form the Puerto Rican Nationalist Party. Figueroa changed political ideals and by 1948 was a member of the Partido Estadista Puertorriqueño (Puerto Rican Statehood Party). That year, he was the only member of the Puerto Rico House of Representatives who did not belong to the Partido Popular Democrático (PPD), and the only Representative to oppose the PPD's approval of what became known as the Ley de la Mordaza (Gag Law), which violated the civil rights of those who favored Puerto Rican Independence. On December 22, 2006, the Puerto Rican Legislature approved a law declaring every September 21, Leopoldo Figueroa Carreras Day.

== Early years ==
Figueroa (birth name: Leopoldo Figueroa Carreras) was born in San Juan, Puerto Rico when the island was still a Spanish colony. He became interested in politics at an early age due to the influences of his father who was a personal friend of the Puerto Rican political leader Luis Muñoz Rivera and his uncle Sotero Figueroa, a close friend of Cuban revolutionary leader José Martí.

In 1898, when he was 11 years old, the United States invaded Puerto Rico. Some Puerto Rican leaders, such as José de Diego and Eugenio María de Hostos, expected the United States to grant the island its independence. However, this did not concur with the Monroe Doctrine, or the geopolitical interests of the United States. Under the terms of the Treaty of Paris of 1898 ratified on December 10, 1898, Puerto Rico was annexed as a territory by the United States. Spain had lost its last colony in the western hemisphere, and the United States gained imperial strength and global presence.

When he was 14 years old, Figueroa began participating in the political activities of the "Puerto Rican Federal Party", a party which supported greater self-rule for the island founded by Muñoz Rivera. His interest in journalism was influenced by his uncle who was the manager of "Patria", a newspaper founded by Martí.

He graduated from the Central High School of San Juan and moved to Cuba to study medicine at the University of Havana. In 1922, he moved to Madrid to specialize in Gynecology. In 1926 he graduated as a lawyer from the University of Puerto Rico School of Law.

== Supporter of independence ==
Figueroa became active in the Union Party of Puerto Rico, founded in February 1904 by Luis Muñoz Rivera, Rosendo Matienzo Cintrón, Antonio R. Barceló, José de Diego, and others after the disbanding of the Federal Party. It supported greater self-government for the island but was divided between pro-independence and pro-statehood factions. Figueroa supported independence and belonged to the Unionist subcommittee of the town of Cataño.

In 1906, Figueroa decided to study medicine at the University of Havana in Cuba, but not without having published the article "Adios Patria" ("Good-Bye My Nation") in the newspaper "El Eco de Cataño," an article in which he promised to return and to fight for his country against the new tyrant, the United States.

During his stay in Cuba, he resided with his uncle Sotero Figueroa and befriended various self-exiled Puerto Ricans like Lola Rodríguez de Tió and Sergio Cuevas Zequeira. Figueroa earned his medical degree in 1910 and returned to Puerto Rico.

He continued in his political activities upon his return to the island. In the 1912 Union Party Assembly in Mayagüez, Figueroa presented a motion to expel the members who favored US statehood for Puerto Rico. His motion was opposed by party leaders Herminio Díaz Navarro, Rafael Cuevas Zequeira and Martín Travieso and was not accepted. In the 1914 elections, he was elected to the Camera of Delegates in representation of the District of San Juan. The same year, Barceló, Muñoz Rivera and de Diego were members of an executive council that attempted to form an alliance between the Union and Republican Parties. In 1915, Figueroa and José De Diego traveled to the Dominican Republic and Cuba with the intention of organizing a Union of the Antilles and to gather support for Puerto Rican Independence movement.

By 1920, Figueroa was disillusioned with the party leadership and, together with José S. Alegría (the father of Ricardo Alegría) and Eugenio Font Suárez, founded the Independence Association of Puerto Rico. The Independence Association merged with José Coll y Cuchí's Nationalist Association of Puerto Rico and the Nationalist Youth political organization, to form the Puerto Rican Nationalist Party.

In the 1920/elections, he was elected to the position of Commissioner of Public Service. In 1924, the Union Party joined with dissident members of the Republican Party to form the Alianza ("Alliance"). It generally supported autonomy for Puerto Rico. Figueroa was re-elected to the same political position as before but now as member of the new political organization.

Besides his political obligations, Figueroa continued to practice his medical profession as director of the Maternity Hospital in San Juan. In 1928, he published a medical treatise, "Mortalidad infantil".

== Change to supporter of statehood ==
Figueroa began to doubt that the United States would grant Puerto Rico its independence and that said ideals were more wishful thinking then realistic. He realized that the passage of the Jones-Shafroth Act, which imposed a conditional US citizenship upon the people of Puerto Rico, who had neither asked for nor wanted it, made it clear that the United States had no intentions of granting Puerto Rico independence. His doubts lead him to embrace the idea that Puerto Rico would eventually become a "state" of the United States of America. He then began to associate himself with political organizations whose ideals were pro-statehood.

He then decided to study law at the University of Puerto Rico and in 1927, he earned his degree. The Alliance Party did not last long as a united political organization and was soon divided into two factions, one that believed in independence and later became the Liberal Party of Puerto Rico, the other being pro-statehood. Figueroa joined the latter and later the pro-statehood Puerto Rican Republican Party, also known as the Partido Estadista de Puerto Rico, founded in 1899, by Dr. José Celso Barbosa. The party was renamed in 1930 to Republican Union. He was elected to the Puerto Rican House of Representatives in 1933 and in 1940, representing the districts of Bayamón-Cataño-Guaynabo. On August 19, 1944, he was named vice president of his party.

=== Puerto Rico's Gag Law ===
On May 21, 1948, a bill was introduced before the Puerto Rican Senate which would restrain the rights of the independence and Nationalist movements on the island. The Senate, which at the time was controlled by the Partido Popular Democrático (PPD) and presided by Luis Muñoz Marín, approved the bill that day. This bill, which resembled the anti-communist Smith Act passed in the United States in 1940, became known as the Ley de la Mordaza (Gag Law) when the U.S.-appointed governor of Puerto Rico, Jesús T. Piñero, signed it into law on June 10, 1948.

It now was a crime to print, publish, sell, or exhibit any material intended to paralyze or destroy the insular government or to organize any society, group, or assembly of people with a similar destructive intent. It made it illegal to sing a patriotic song, and reinforced the 1898 law that had made it illegal to display the Flag of Puerto Rico, with anyone found guilty of disobeying the law in any way being subject to a sentence of up to ten years imprisonment, a fine of US$10,000 (equivalent to $134,000 in 2025), or both. According to Figueroa, the only non-PPD member of the Puerto Rico House of Representatives, the law was repressive and violated the First Amendment of the US Constitution which guarantees Freedom of Speech. He pointed out that the law violated the civil rights of Puerto Ricans.

== New Progressive Party and later years ==
Figueroa was elected to the Puerto Rican Senate in 1952, 1956, 1960 and 1964, representing the Republican Union. He was a member of the Constitutional Convention of Puerto Rico (1951–1952). On January 22, 1967, the Republican Union called for an assembly to discuss the Puerto Rican status issue. A result of the meeting was the creation of the political organization "Estadistas Unidos" (United Statehooders) which was renamed "Partido Nuevo Progresista" (PNP or New Progressive Party of Puerto Rico), presided by Luis A. Ferré. Figueroa joined the new organization and served in the House of Representatives and also as the organizations first representative in the Board of the State Elections. In 1968, Luis A. Ferré was elected Governor of Puerto Rico and the PNP gained control of the Puerto Rican House Representatives. Angel Viera Martínez was named president of the House and he in turn named Figueroa his parliamentary assessor. During his later years, Figueroa married Carmen Vazquez Rivera, a decorated veteran of the US Army and Air Force who was among the Puerto Rican women that served in World War II and later the Korean War. As a Head Nurse, Vazquez and Figueroa shared a medical background and lived in the Santurce area of San Juan until his death.

== Legacy ==
Figueroa continued in his political profession until his death on October 15, 1969. The Government of Puerto Rico named a public housing project "Leopoldo Figueroa Carreras" in his honor. On December 22, 2006, the Government of Puerto Rico approved Law 282, which declares every September 21 of every year as "Leopoldo Figueroa Day". He is the subject of the 2012 book Dr. Leopoldo Figueroa, El Ideario de un Decano 1889 – 1969, published by the Office of the Official Historian of Puerto Rico.

== See also ==
- List of Puerto Ricans
- Sotero Figueroa
- Carmen Vazquez Rivera
- Luis Muñoz Rivera
