= Cementerio Municipal de Mayagüez =

Cemetery in Mayagüez, Puerto Rico

- U.S. National Register of Historic Places
- Puerto Rico Historic Sites and Zones
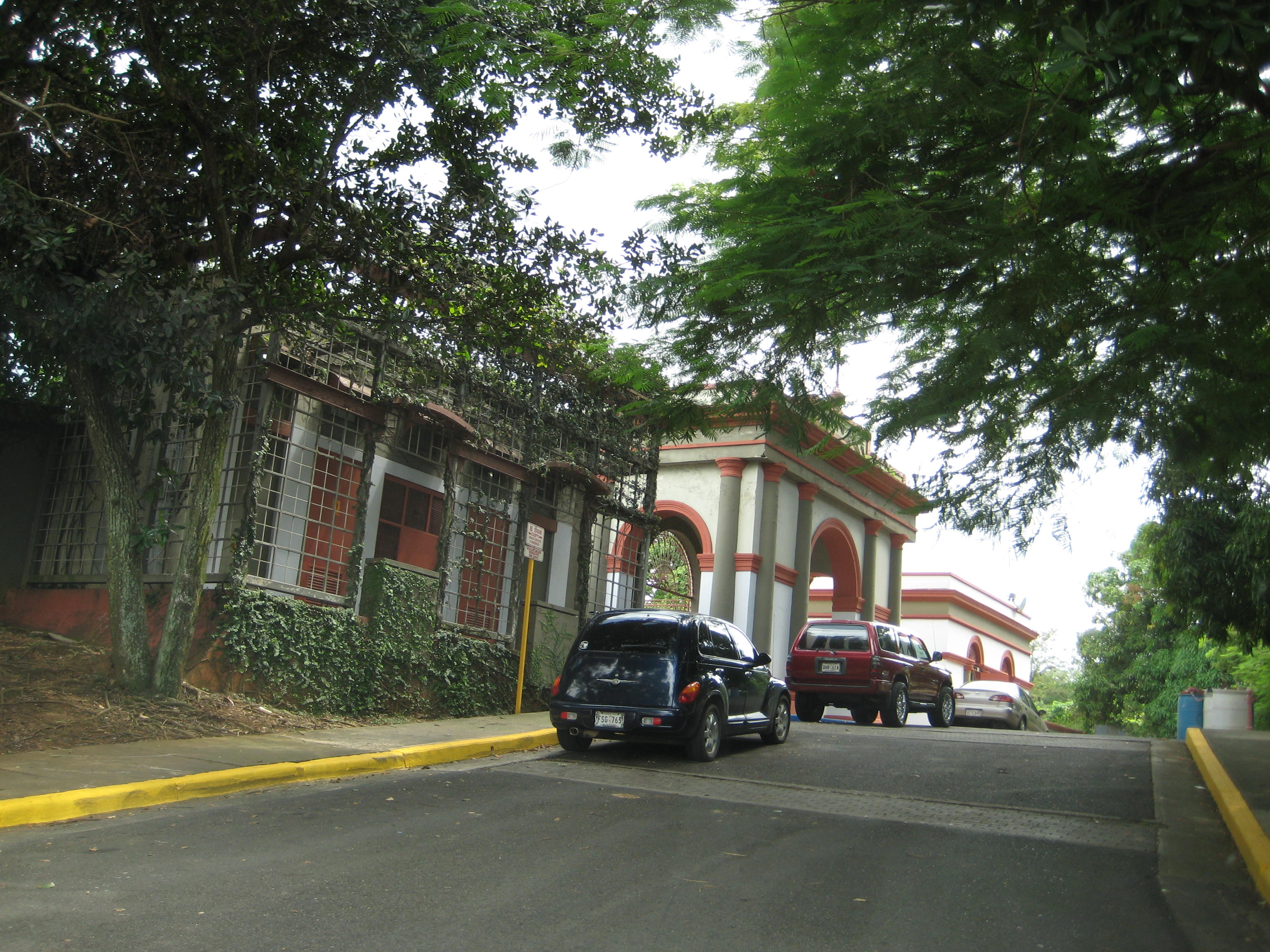

- Location within Puerto Rico
- Location: Southern end of Post Street, Mayaguez, Puerto Rico
- Coordinates: 18°11′28″N 67°08′31″W
- Area: 5.3 acres (2.1 ha)
- Built: 1876
- Architect: Vidal D'Ors, D. Felipe; Puig, Juan Jose
- Architectural style: Classical Revival
- MPS: Cemeteries in Puerto Rico, 1804–1920 MPS
- NRHP reference No.: 88001247
- RNSZH No.: 2000-(RO)-19-JP-SH

Significant dates
- Added to NRHP: August 25, 1988
- Designated RNSZH: December 21, 2000

The Cementerio Municipal de Mayagüez, also known as Cementerio Viejo, was constructed in 1876 in Mayaguez, Puerto Rico. It was designed by the municipal architect Félix Vidal d’Ors following the master plan for the city from 1804. The outskirts of the cemetery are defined by brick walls and niches, the area is divided by two streets that intersect. Following an 1872 law the cemetery provided separated areas intended for non-Catholics and for the poor, located in the east.

It was listed on the National Register of Historic Places in 1988 and on the Puerto Rico Register of Historic Sites and Zones in 2000. The listing includes two contributing buildings, one contributing site, and five other contributing structures. It is one of the most elegant and carefully designed cemeteries on the island.

== Notable interments ==
- Tulio Larrínaga, former Resident Commissioner of Puerto Rico from 1905 – 1911
- Alicia Moreda, actress/comedian
- Juan Mari Bras, founder of the Movimiento Pro Independencia and the modern Puerto Rican Socialist Party
- María Luisa Arcelay, educator, businesswoman and politician
- Shorty Castro, comedian, actor, comedy writer and stage director
- Mon Rivera musician
- Juancho Bascarán, mayor of Las Marias, fought in the Spanish–American War
- Mariano Riera Palmer, mayor of Mayaguez
- Pedro Juan Rúa Rullán, influential author and college professor and grandson of former Mayagüez mayor Juan Rullán Rivera
