= Santa María Magdalena de Pazzis Cemetery =

Colonial-era cemetery in Old San Juan, Puerto Rico

Santa Maria Magdalena de Pazzis Cemetery
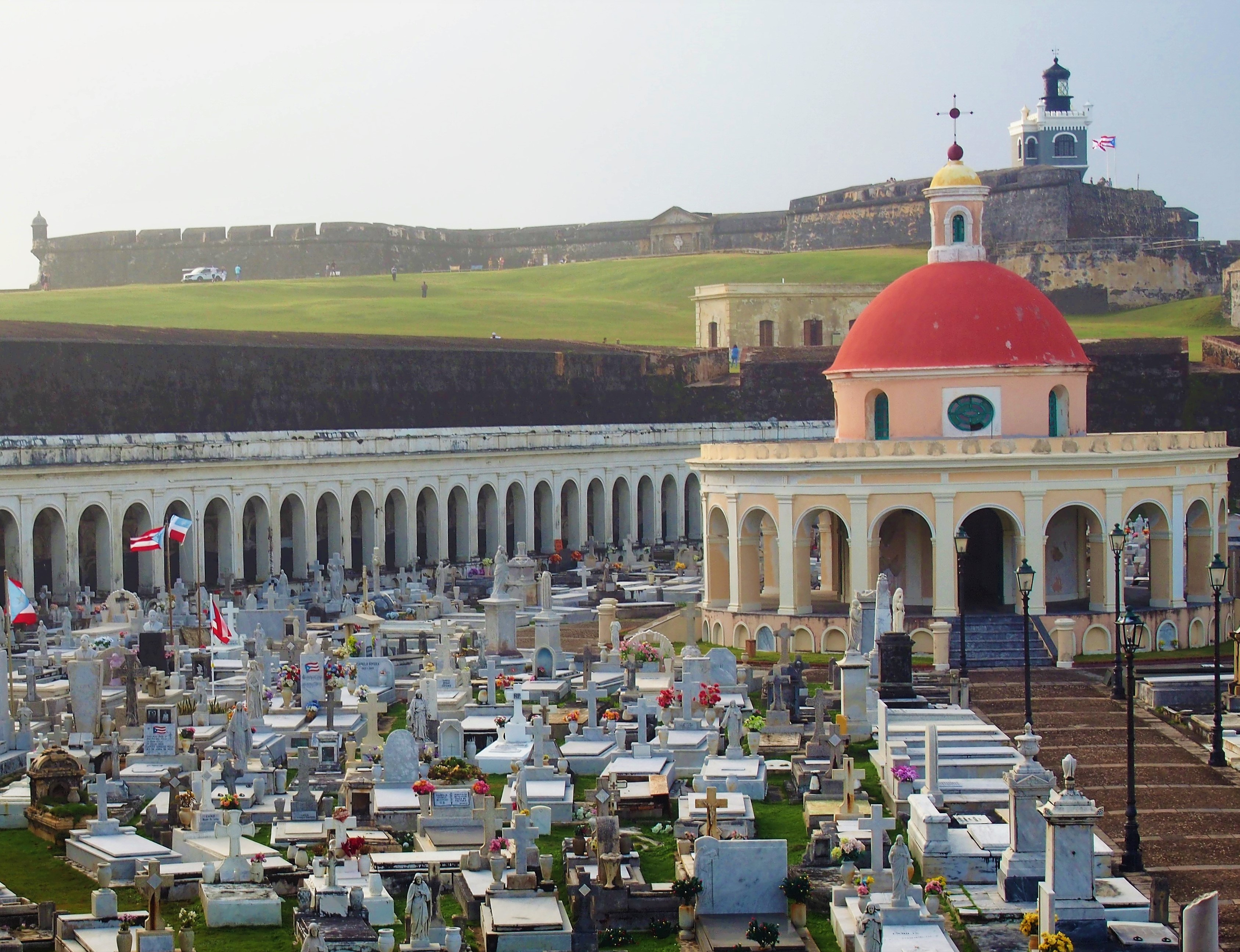
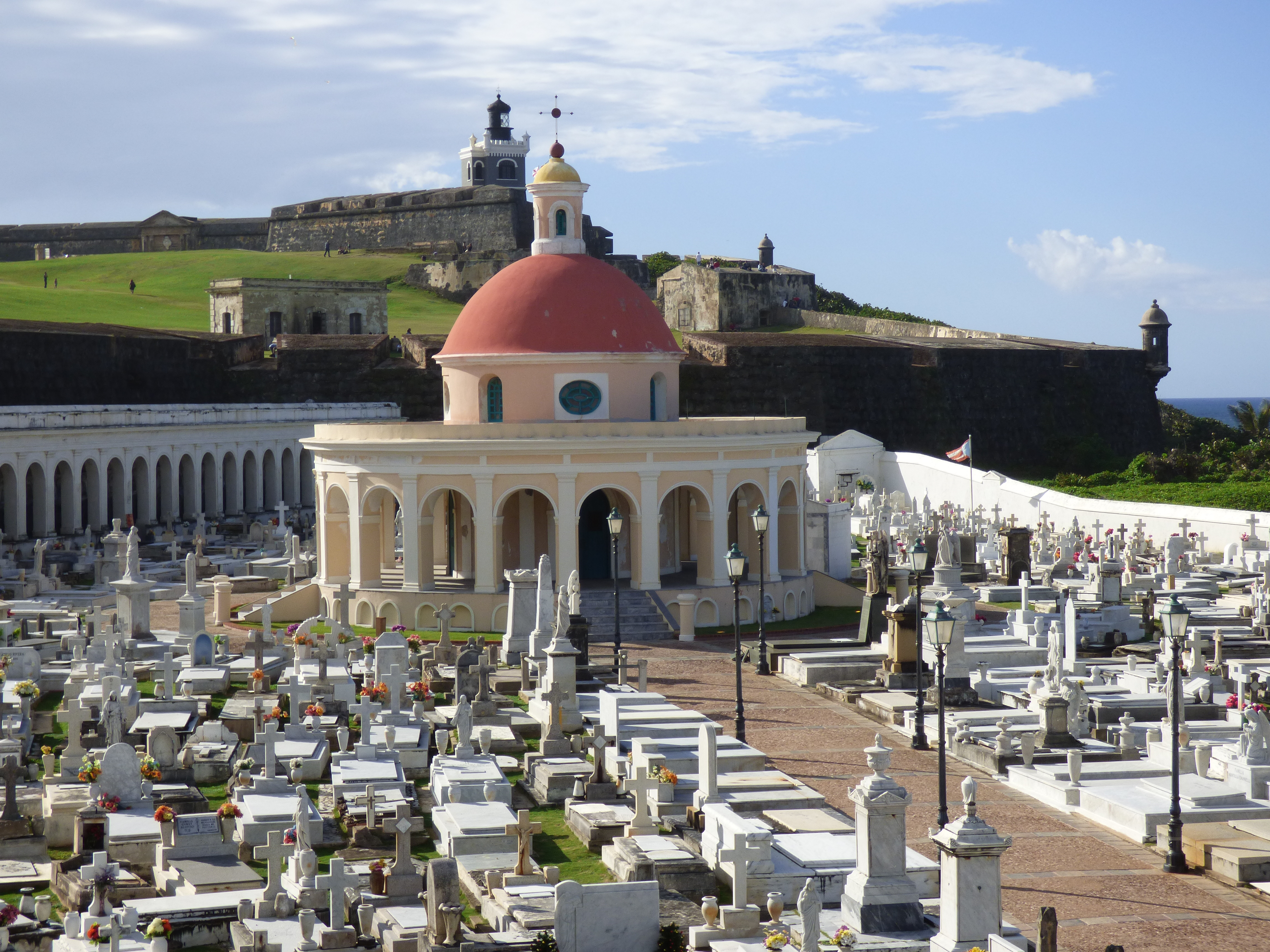
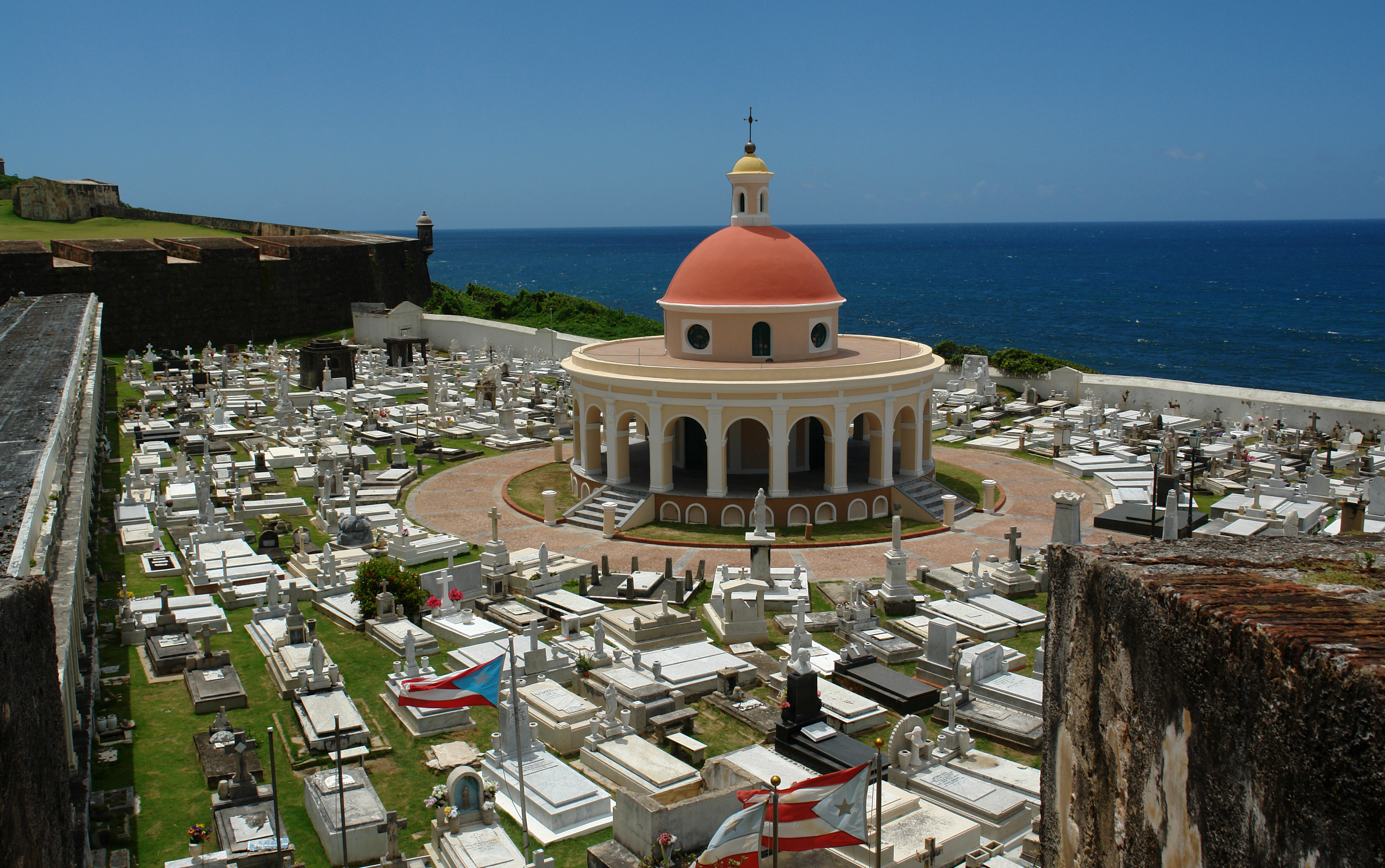
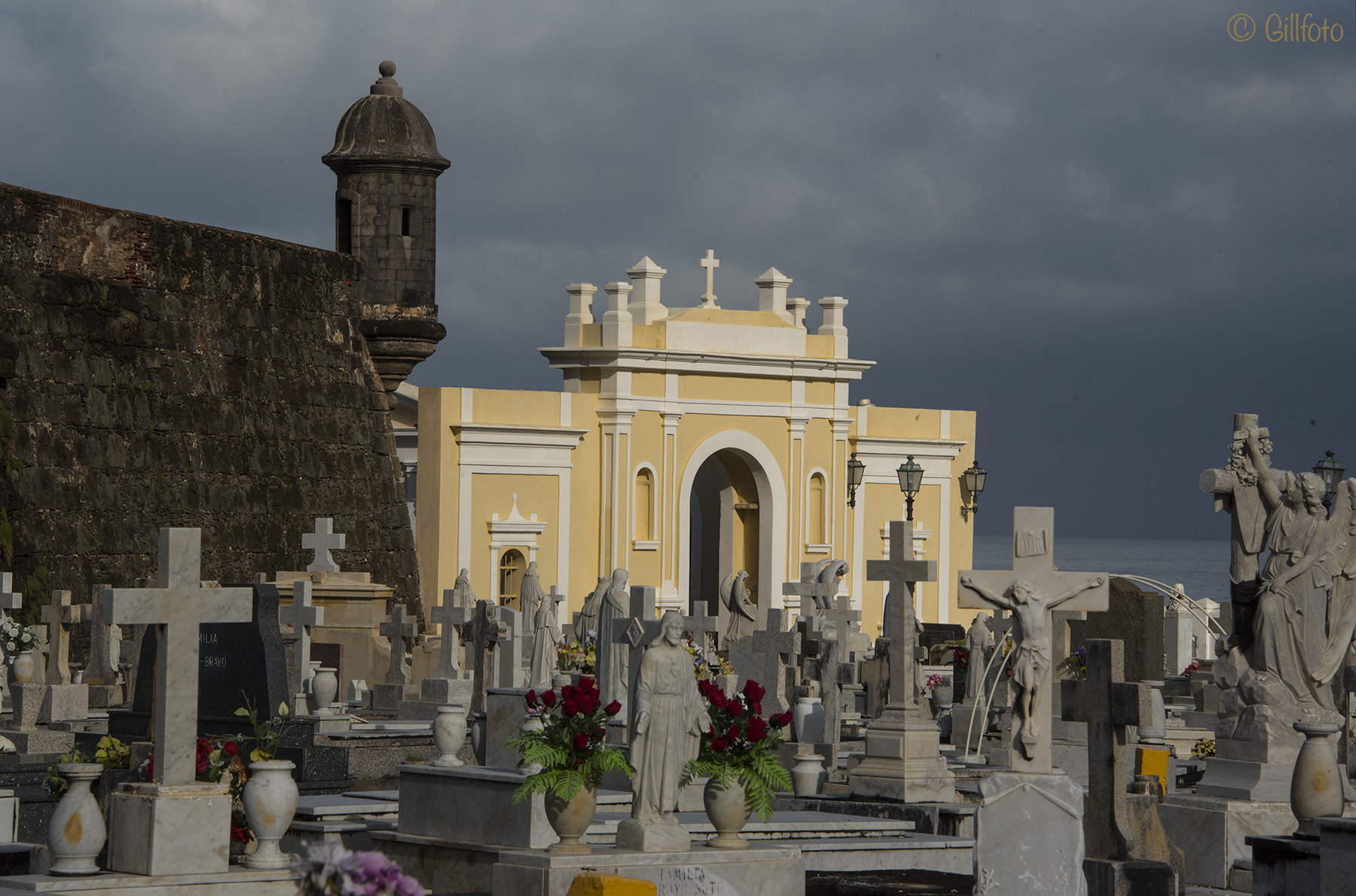
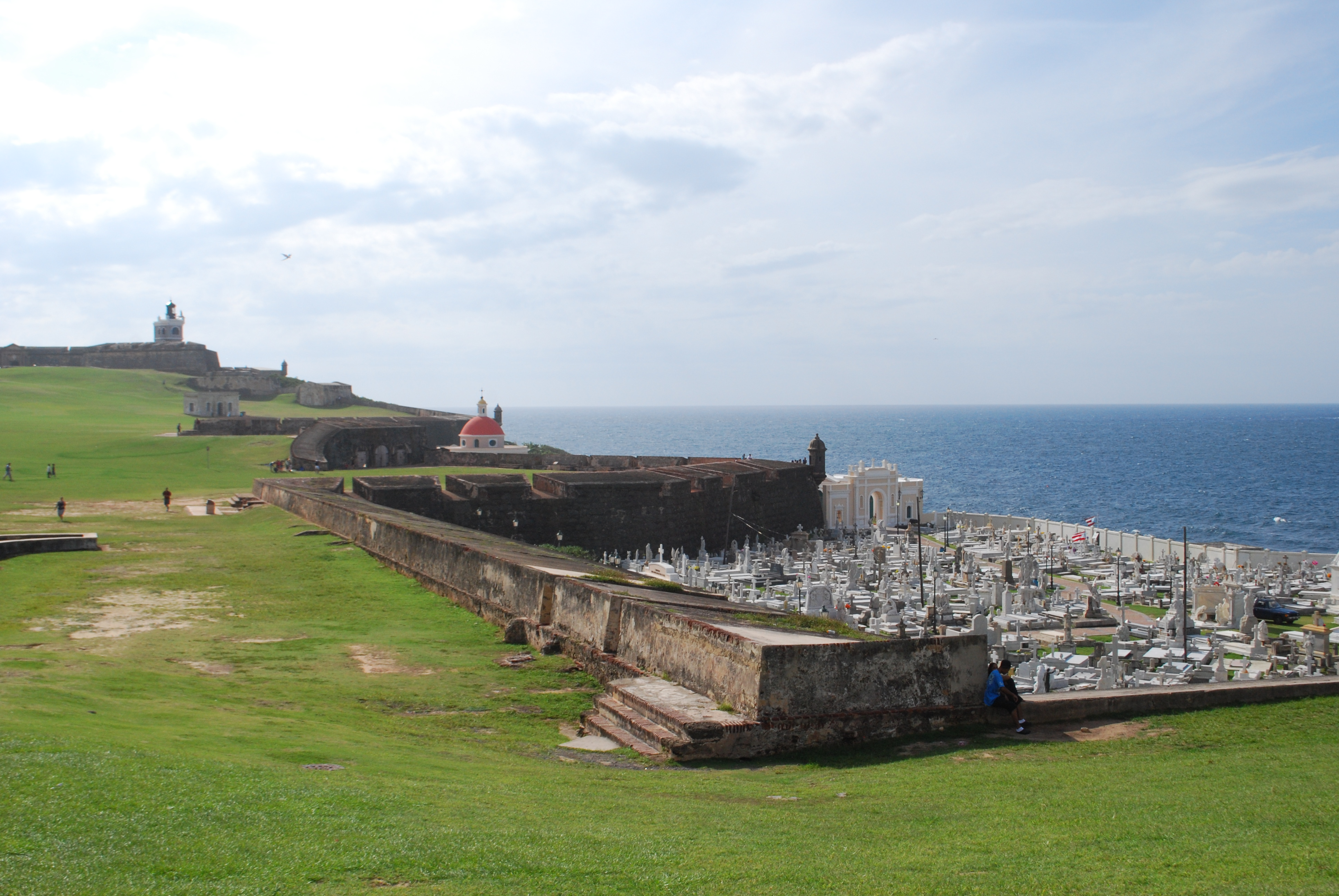
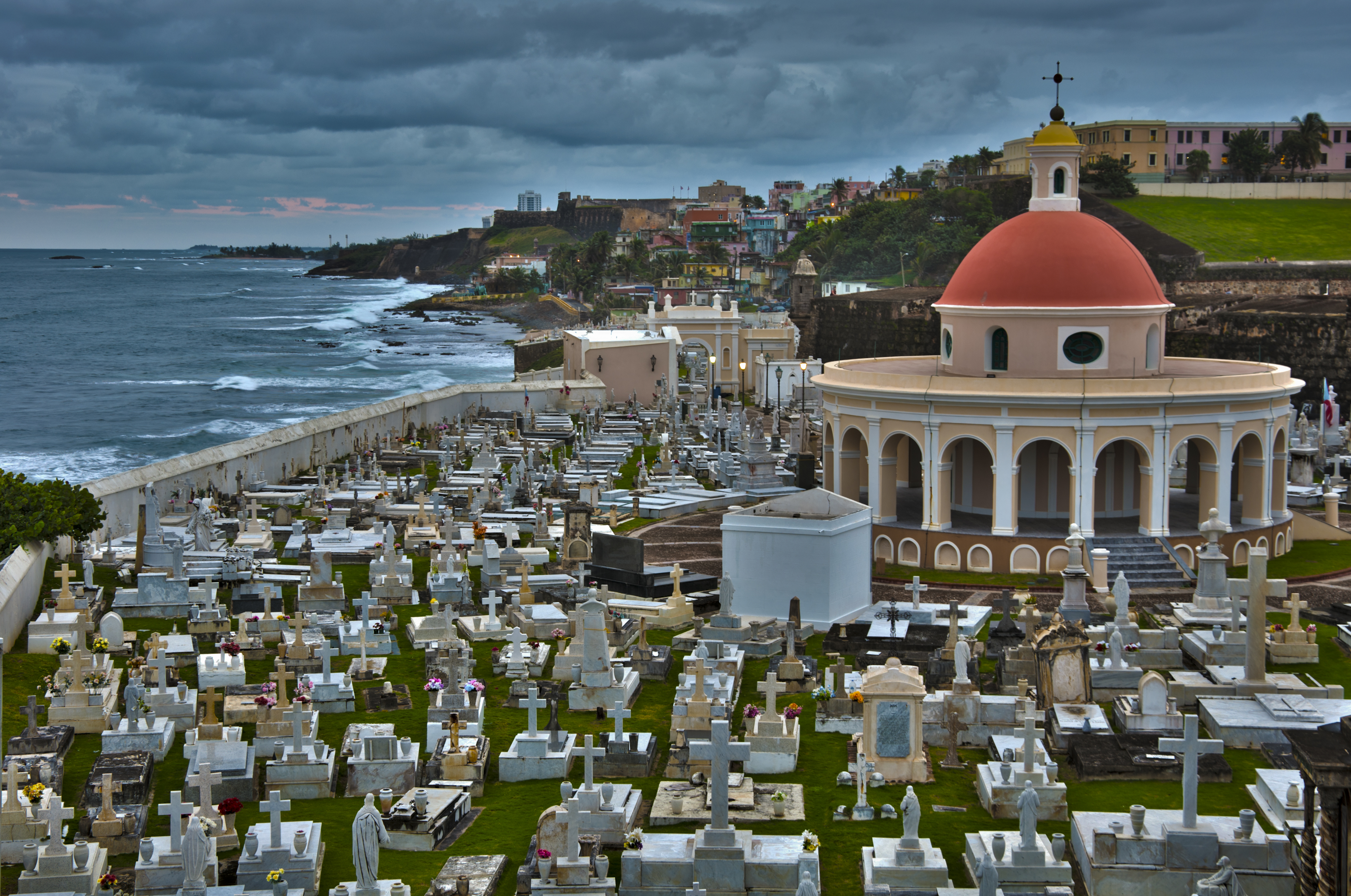
- View of cemetery overlooking the Atlantic Ocean outside the Walls of Old San Juan, in-between the historic fortress of El Morro to the west, and the historic shantytown of La Perla to the east
- Interactive map of Santa Maria Magdalena de Pazzis Cemetery

Details
- Established: 1863
- Location: Old San Juan, Puerto Rico
- Country: United States
- Coordinates: 18°28′11″N 66°07′13″W
- Type: Public
- No. of graves: 1,500+
- Santa María Magdalena de Pazzis Cemetery
- U.S. Historic district – Contributing property
- U.S. National Historic Landmark District – Contributing property
- Part of: Old San Juan Historic District (ID72001553 & ID13000284)

Significant dates
- Designated CP: October 10, 1972
- Designated NHLDCP: February 27, 2013

The Santa María Magdalena de Pazzis Cemetery (Spanish: Cementerio Santa María Magdalena de Pazzis) is a historic Catholic cemetery located in Old San Juan, Puerto Rico. It is the final resting place of many of Puerto Rico's most prominent natives and residents. Construction began in 1863 under the auspices of Ignacio Mascaro. The cemetery is located outside the walls of Castillo San Felipe del Morro fortress, one of the island's most famous landmarks. The average height of the wall is 12 metres (39 ft) and the width ranges from 4.6 to 6.1 metres (15 to 20 ft). It was named in honor of Saint Maria Magdalena de Pazzi.

According to Rafael Rodríguez, Chaplain and director of pastoral services at the Universidad del Sagrado Corazón located in the Santurce district of the capital, the location of the cemetery is central to the Puerto Rican belief in the separation of death and life. The colonial Spanish government at the time construction of the cemetery commenced, viewed death with fear because it was a mystery. Therefore, they decided to build the cemetery to overlook the Atlantic Ocean to symbolize the spirit's journey to cross over to the afterlife.

== Notable interments ==
- Pedro Albizu Campos, nationalist leader and politician
- Aurora de Albornoz, scholar, poet
- José Julián Acosta, abolitionist, journalist
- Ricardo Alegría, father of modern Puerto Rican archaeology
- Miguel Ángel Álvarez, journalist, comedian and actor
- Jose Celso Barbosa, founder of the Puerto Rican statehood movement
- Antonio R. Barceló, lawyer, businessman and politician
- Félix Benítez Rexach, architect and engineer
- Salvador Brau, journalist, poet and historian
- Norma Candal, actress
- Gilberto Concepción de Gracia, politician, founder of the Puerto Rican Independence Party
- Rafael Cordero, known as "The Father of Public Education in Puerto Rico".
- Tony Croatto, Italian-Puerto Rican folk singer, composer and television presenter
- Tite Curet Alonso, composer
- Conchita Dapena, former First Lady of Puerto Rico
- José de Diego, poet, lawyer and liberal politician
- Manuel Fernandez Juncos, Spanish writer, poet, journalist, writer of Puerto Rican national anthem
- José Ferrer, Academy Award-winning actor and director
- Miguel Ferrer, actor, José Ferrer's son
- Leopoldo Figueroa, nationalist leader and politician, co-founder of the Independence Association of Puerto Rico, lawyer, and medical doctor
- Pedro Flores, composer
- José Gautier Benítez, poet
- Rafael Hernández, composer and musician
- Victoria Hernández, music entrepreneur and musician
- Santiago Iglesias, former Resident Commissioner of Puerto Rico
- Tito Lara, composer and musician
- Lolita Lebrón, nationalist leader
- Muna Lee, writer and first wife of Luis Muñoz Marín
- Gilberto Monroig, singer
- Samuel R. Quiñones, politician
- Henry A. Reed, US Army brigadier general
- Evaristo Ribera Chevremont, poet
- Ramón Rivero (Diplo), actor and comedian
- Ángel Rivero Méndez, soldier, writer, journalist and businessman credited with inventing "Kola Champagne"
- Pedro Salinas, Spanish poet
- Luis Sánchez Morales, politician
- Miguel Ángel Suárez, actor
- Salvador Tió Montes de Oca, writer, poet, journalist
- Rafael Tufiño, painter and graphic artist
- Carmen Vazquez Rivera, officer of the U.S. Army and U.S. Air Force, veteran of World War II and the Korean War

== Gallery ==
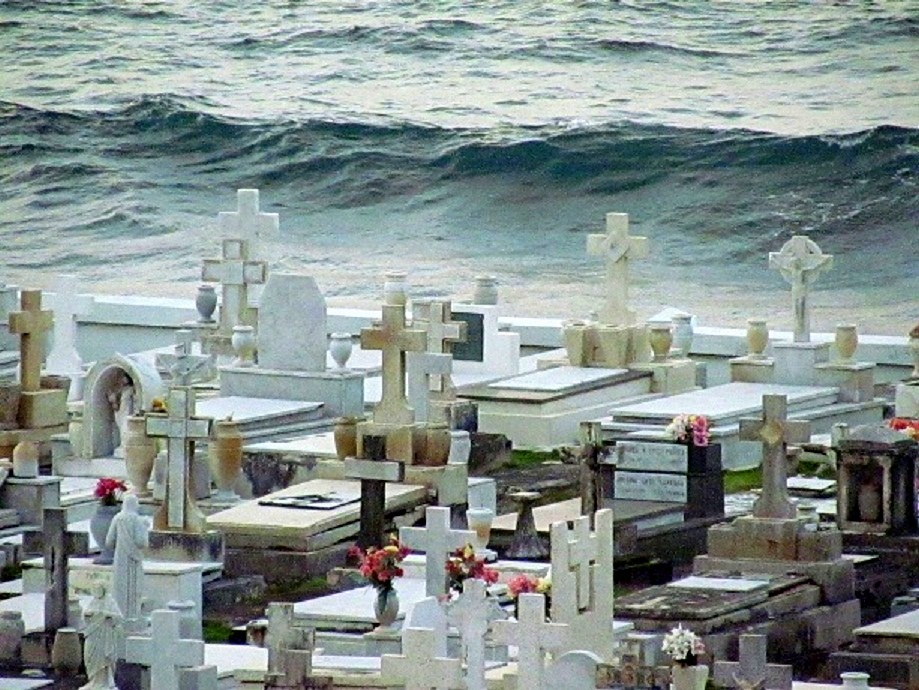
Waves of the Atlantic Ocean are the backdrop of the cemetery

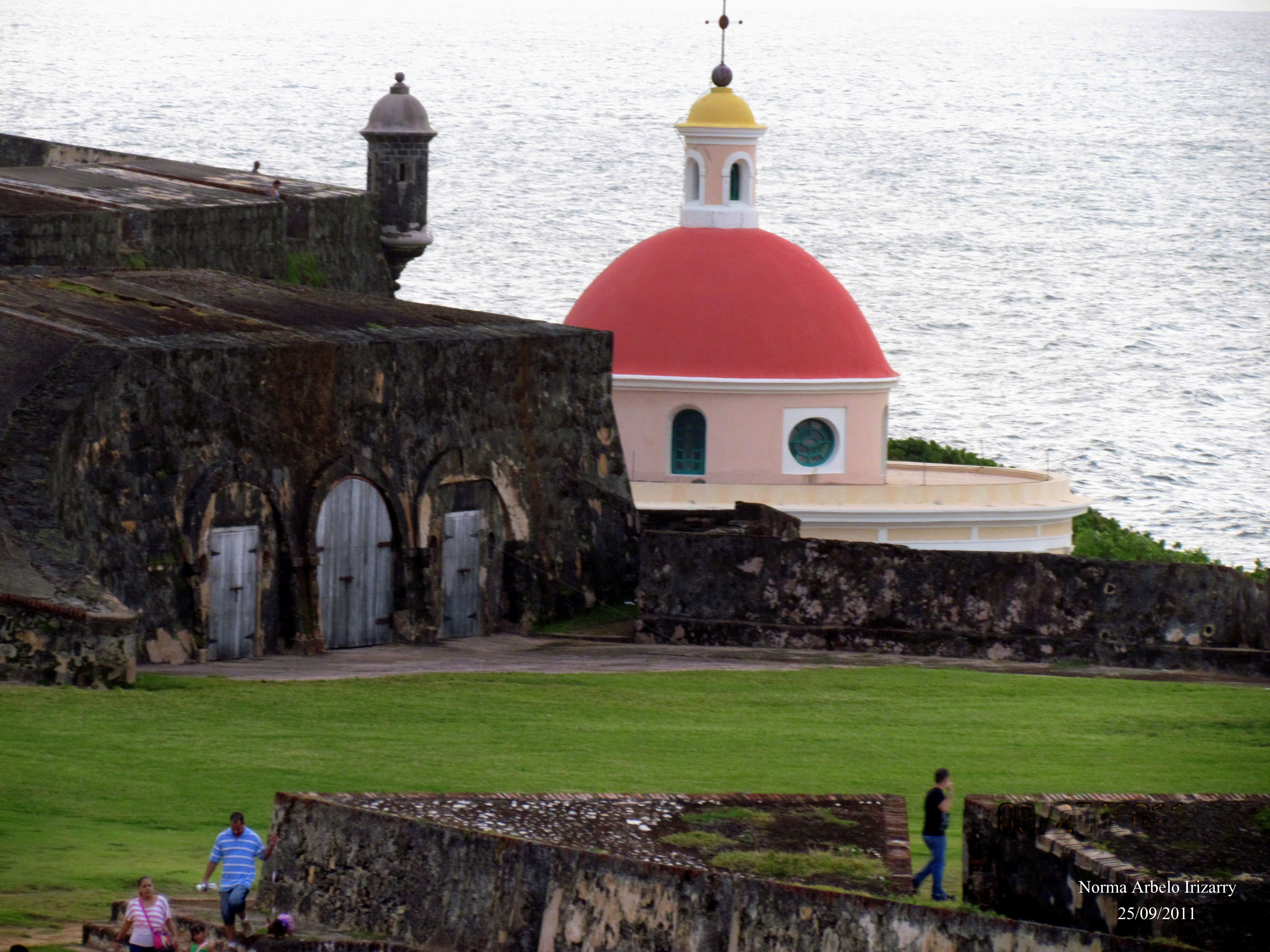

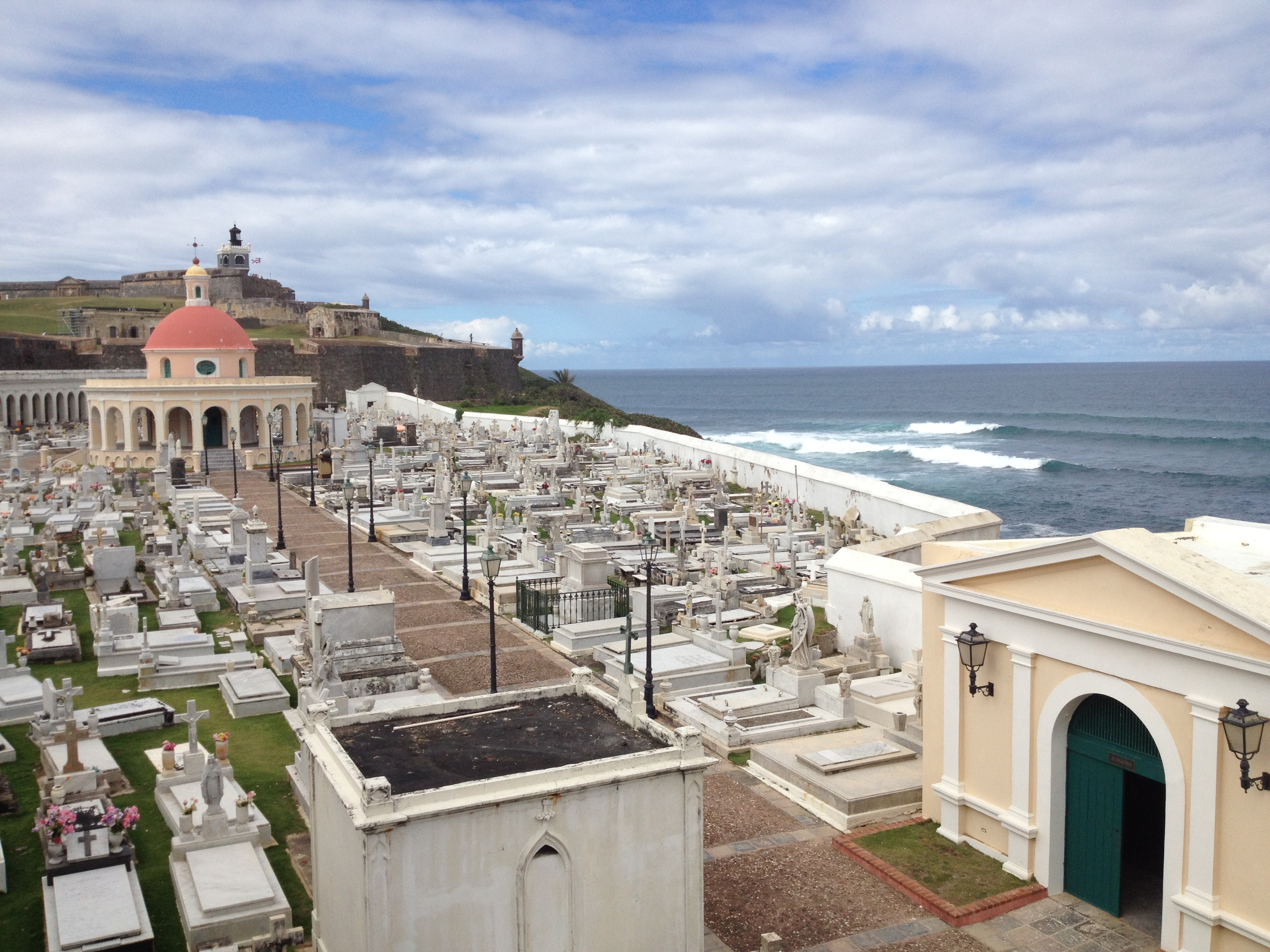

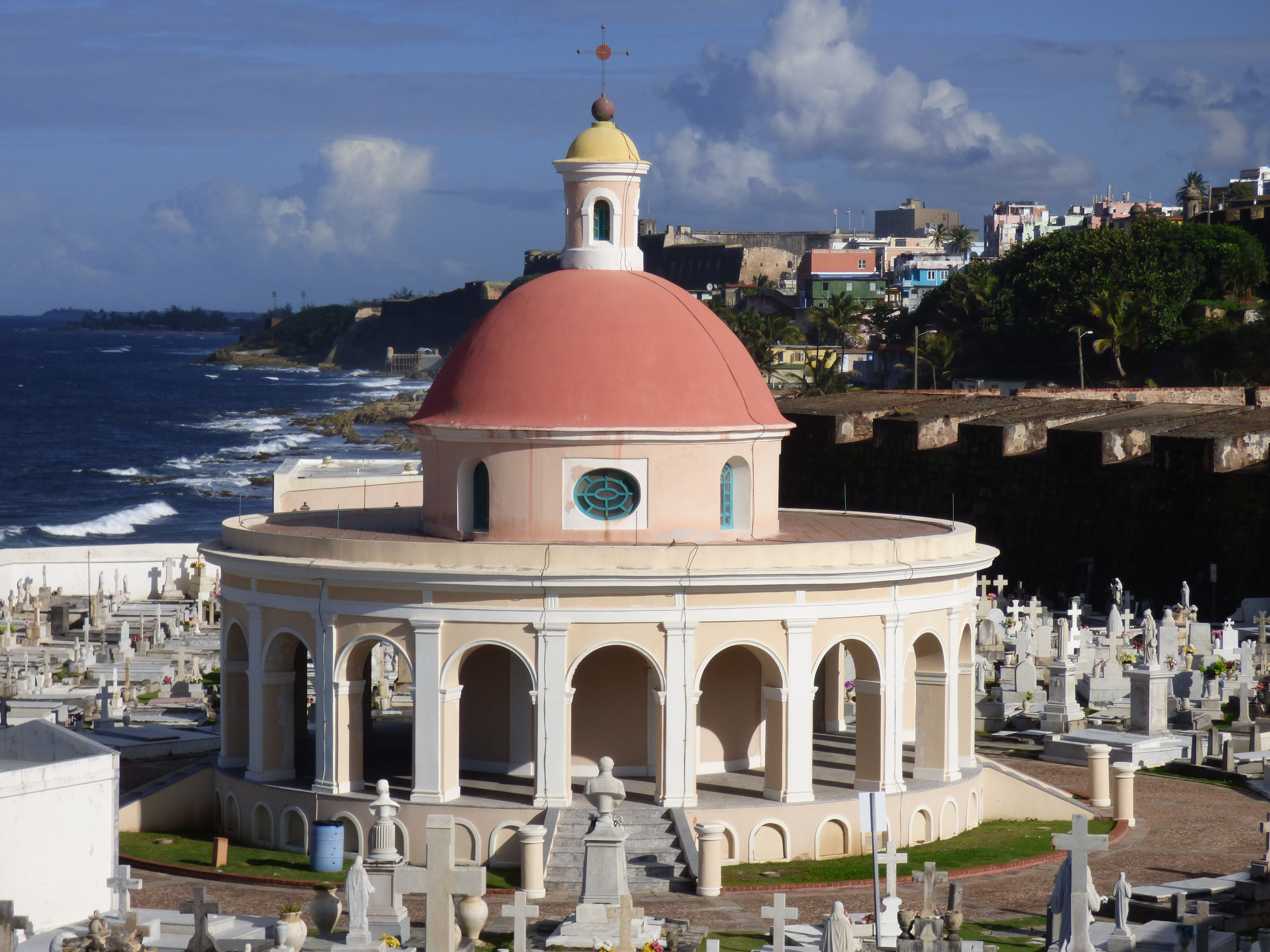

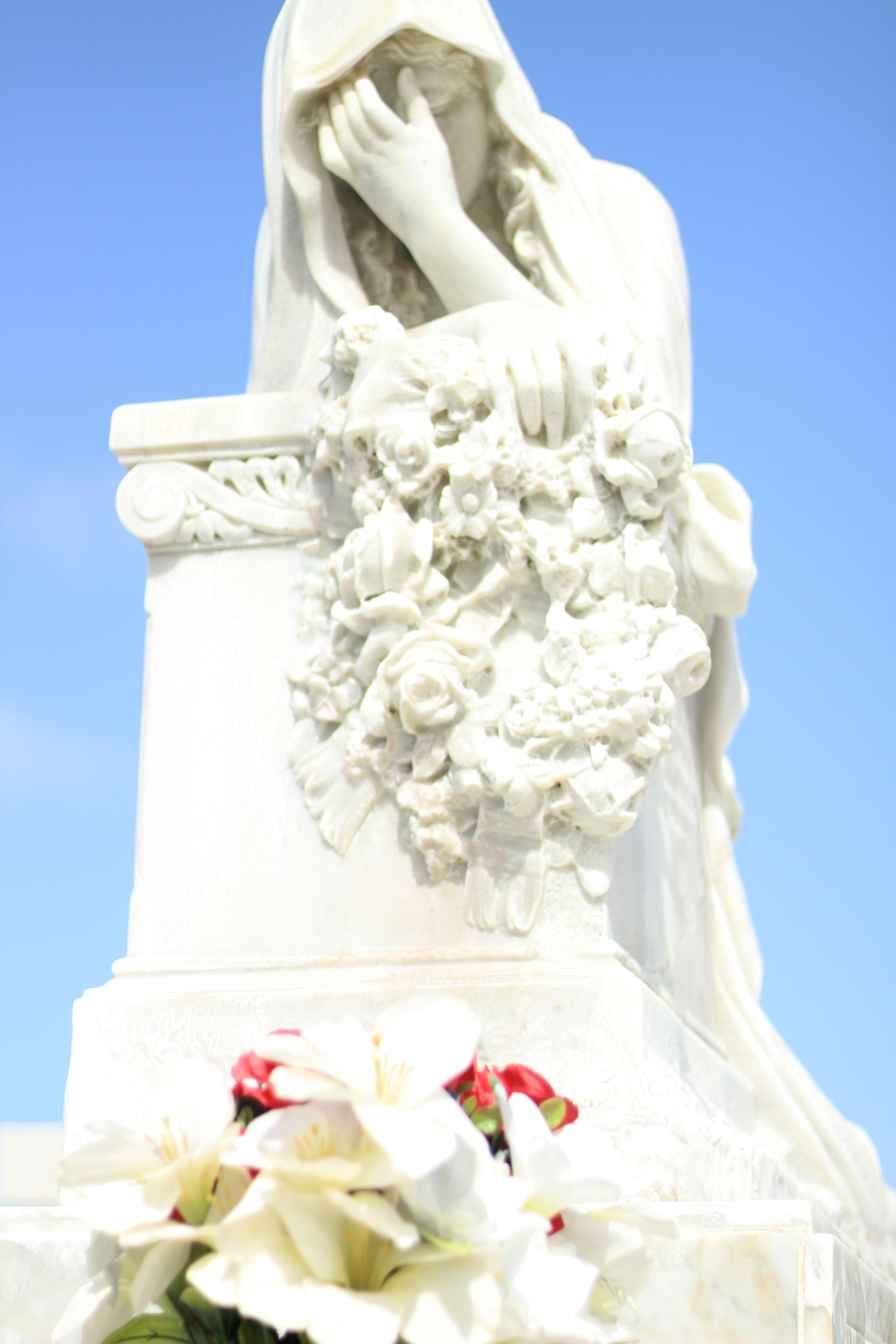
Statue at the cemetery

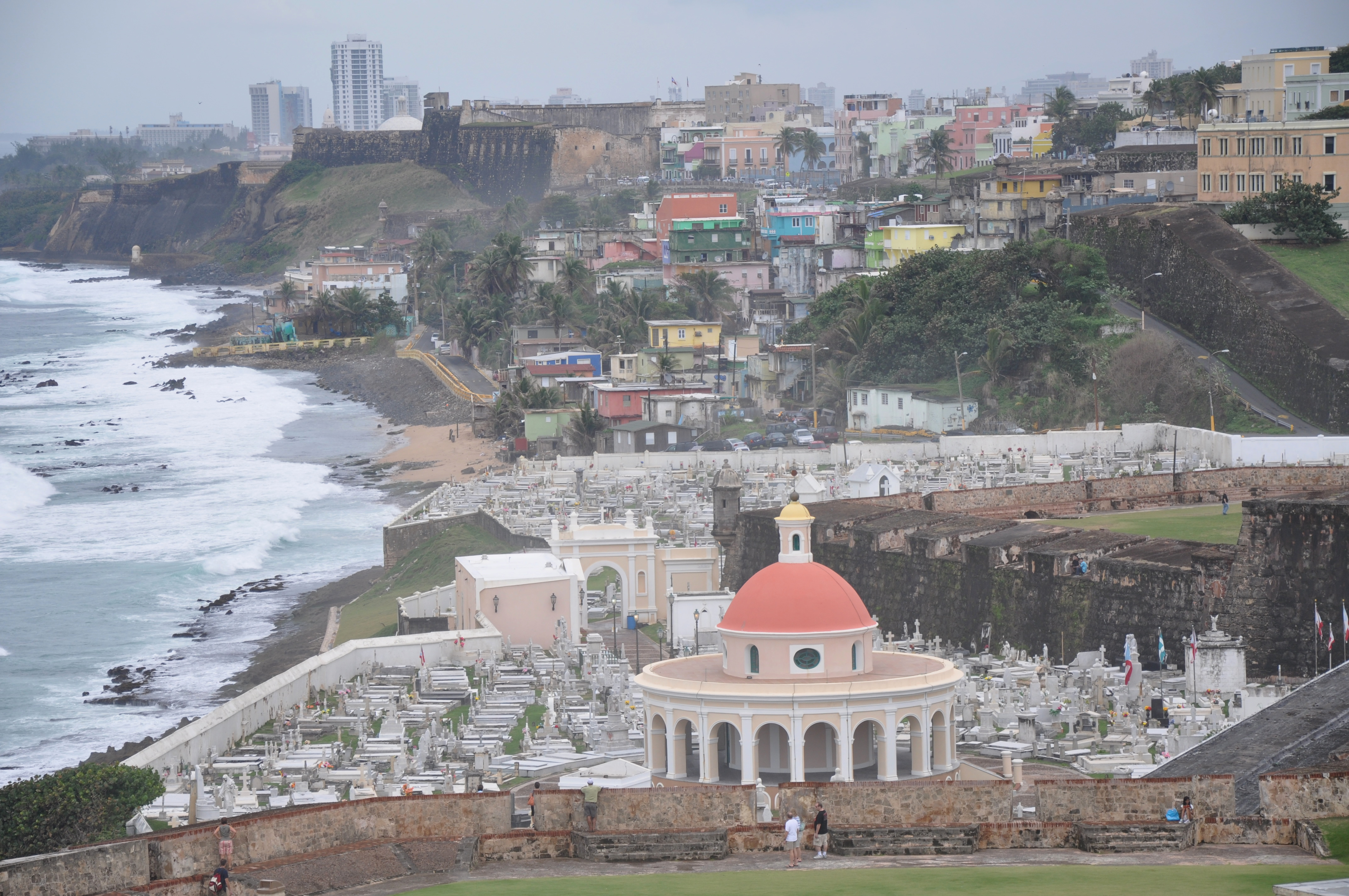

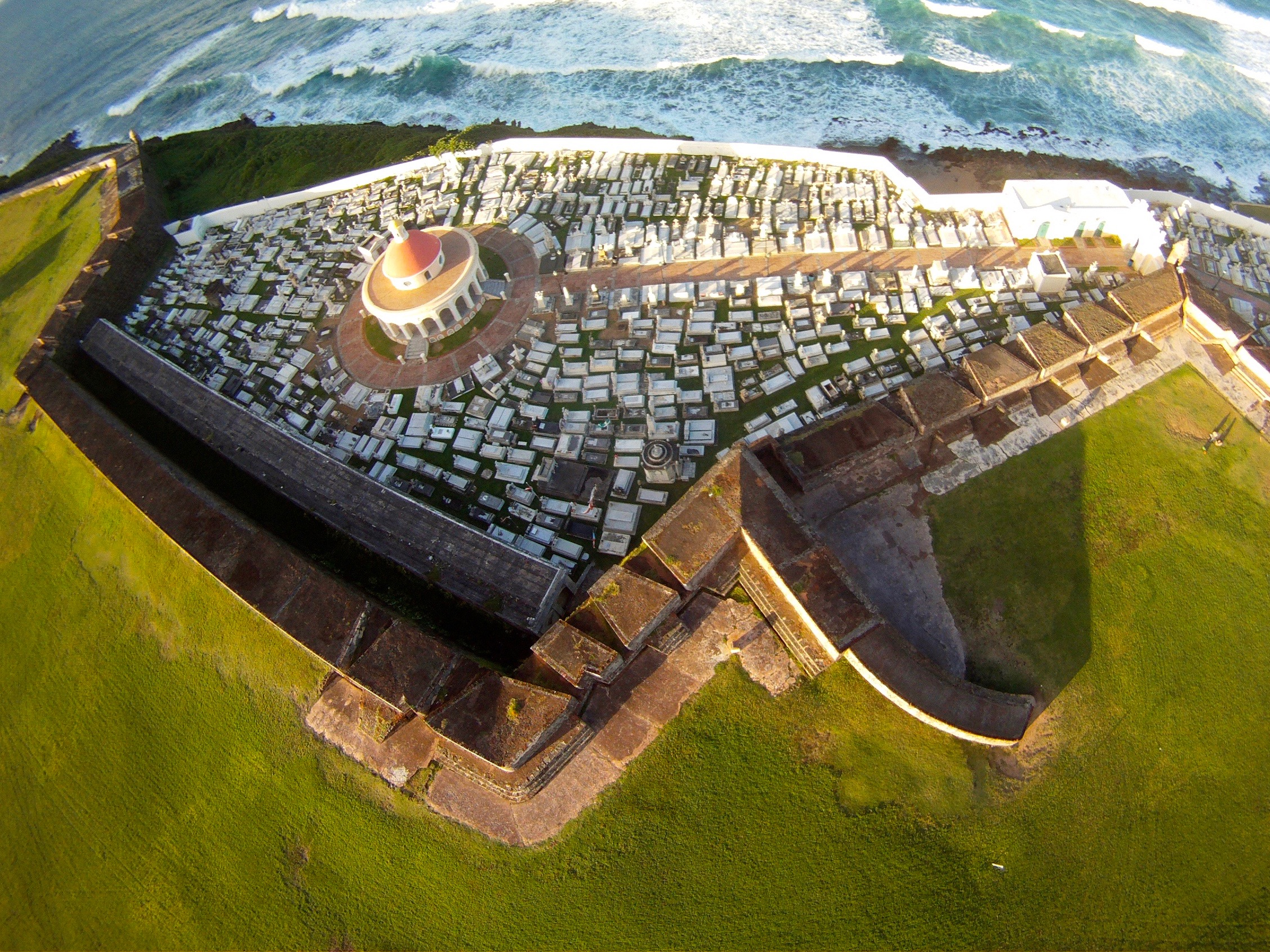
Kite aerial photo of Santa María Magdalena de Pazzis

== See also ==
- List of Puerto Ricans
- El Cañuelo
- Castillo San Cristóbal (San Juan)
- La Perla
