= Carmen Vazquez Rivera =

U.S. Army and Air force officer (1922–2025)

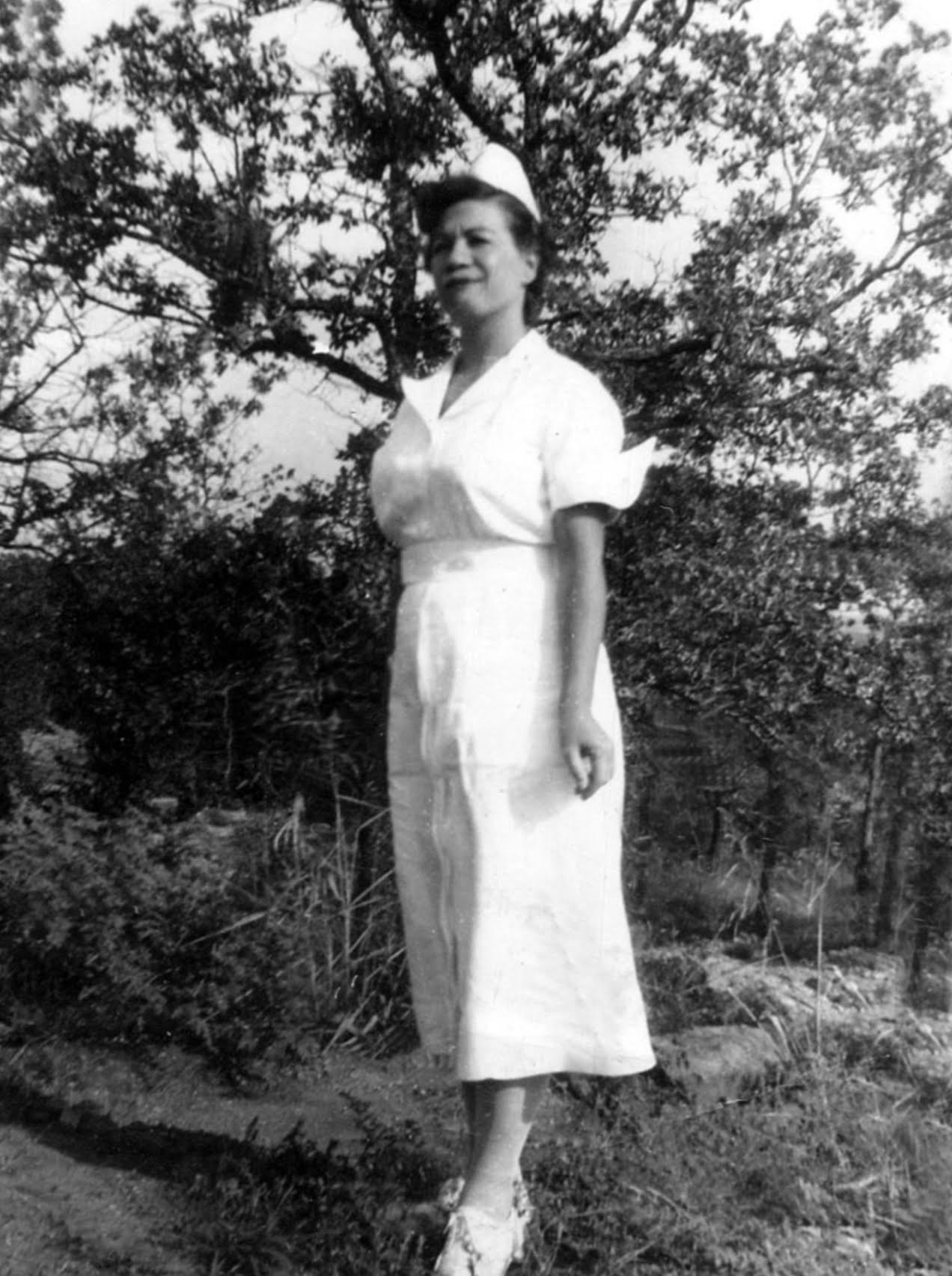
- Born: Carmen Maria Vazquez Rivera; February 15, 1922; Cidra, Puerto Rico
- Died: March 8, 2025 (aged 103); Tallahassee, Florida, U.S.
- Burial place: Santa María Magdalena de Pazzis Cemetery, Old San Juan
- Spouses: Leopoldo Figueroa (divorced) (m. 1963; died 1969) Paul E. Geguire (divorced)
- Military career
- Allegiance: United States of America
- Branch: United States Army; United States Air Force
- Service years: 1944–1946 US Army; 1953–1973 US Air Force
- Rank: First Lieutenant
- Units: United States Army Nurse Corps; United States Air Force Nurse Corps
- Conflicts: World War II; Korean War
- Awards: American Campaign Medal; WWII Victory Medal; Overseas Service Bars (3); National Defense Service Medal; LULAC Presidential Medal of Freedom (2022)

Carmen Maria Vazquez Rivera de Figueroa (Note: This name uses Spanish marriage naming customs; the first is the maiden family name "Vazquez" and the second or matrimonial family name is "Rivera".) (February 15, 1922 – March 8, 2025) was a Puerto Rican United States Army and Air Force officer and nurse who served in both World War II and the Korean War. She was the wife of Puerto Rican politician, lawyer, medical doctor, and scholar Leopoldo Figueroa.

== Early years and background ==
Carmen Maria Vazquez Rivera was born on February 15, 1922, in Cidra, Puerto Rico. Vazquez is the daughter of Maria Engracia Rivera y Rodriguez and Nicasio Vazquez Noguera. She was the first of six children, and niece of the regional Cidra-based businessman Manuel Rivera, Maria Engracia's brother. Carmen and her siblings Nicasio, Laura, Roberto, Jose and Carola, were raised in Cidra.

=== Medical career ===
In 1938 Vazquez decided to pursue a career in medicine at the age of sixteen and began studies to become a nurse. She first studied nursing in the Escuela del Distrito de Bayamón, where she graduated in 1942. She then continued her education with a course in obstetrics from the Hospital de la Capital de San Juan. There she served in numerous capacities including as an anesthesiologist of dystocic cases, auxiliary operating room supervisor, and instructor of auxiliary nurses. During this period she also joined the Red Cross. In addition to her nursing education, Vazquez also studied Domestic Economy from the University of Puerto Rico.

== Military service ==
=== World War II ===
At the start of the United States involvement in WWII, the US Army and Navy Nurse Corps were not accepting Puerto Rican nurses. This position was reversed in April 1944, and Vazquez joined the United States Army that first year in December as a nurse. She quickly served in numerous leadership capacities, including becoming Head Nurse in charge of the orthopedic department with the 161st General Hospital at San Juan's Fort Brooke and held the rank of Second Lieutenant. Vazquez's other roles included serving as an auxiliary operating room supervisor, an instructor of auxiliary nurses, as well as performing the delivery of over 100 births.

Following the conclusion of the war, Vazquez became a decorated veteran following her wartime service and received a signed letter from President Truman. She had also met with Truman in person at a WWII victory celebration held in Washington D.C. at the conclusion of the war. She was later transferred to the Hospital of Trinidad in 1946, after which she was honorably discharged and returned to her civilian nursing career.

=== Korean War ===
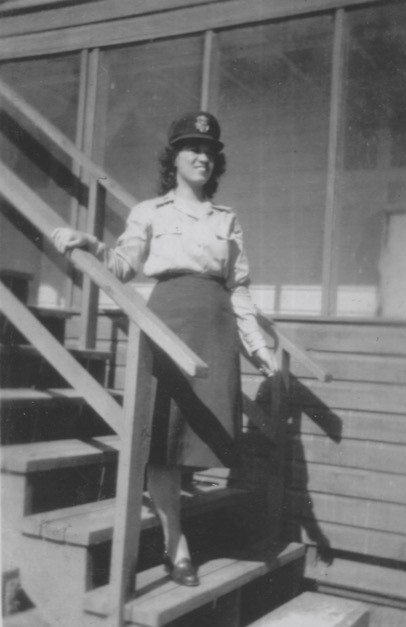
First Lieutenant Carmen Maria Vazquez Rivera during her service in the United States Air Force, circa 1953

In 1953 Vazquez was recruited back to the armed services during the Korean War. For her second period of service, Vazquez was promoted to the rank of First Lieutenant and served in the United States Air Force. During her time with the U.S. Air Force, Vazquez won a beauty pageant of women in the armed services. During the crowning ceremony, singer Elvis Presley was present and performed for the crowd present. As the winner, Vazquez briefly danced with Presley during his performance and would keep the tiara she was crowned with as a memento until her death. Following her active duty Air Force service, Vazquez remained in the United States Air Force Nurse Corps with the Air Force Reserve for 20 years, she retired from the military service in 1973.

== Post-military career and later years ==
Following her WWII service, Vazquez returned to her civilian nursing career and relocated to New York City in the late 1940s. In New York she studied physical therapy in Columbia University and practiced nursing at the Columbia-Presbyterian Medical Center. Vazquez also studied and was certified in Criminology from Bolan Academy in New York, after which she briefly worked as a private detective.

She then moved to Miami Beach where, in 1955, she became licensed to practice nursing in the state of Florida. While in Miami Beach she practiced in Mount Sinai Hospital. By the 1960s Vazquez had relocated back to Puerto Rico and lived in the Santurce area of the capital, San Juan. There she would donate her specialized medical background in service of the community as a Mutual Aid nurse and volunteer.

Following her retirement in Puerto Rico, Vazquez later relocated to the Florida capital of Tallahassee in 2011. There she spent her final years and became a member of several US veterans organizations including the American Legion and the Veterans Club of the 65th Infantry, the latter of which became known as "The Borinqueneers” during the Korean War.

== Personal life ==
Vazquez was twice married to Puerto Rican medical doctor, lawyer, politician, and scholar Leopoldo Figueroa. The couple first met in the San Juan municipal hospital when Figueroa was Vazquez's clinical instructor in the obstetrician ward during the 1940s. The pair were married following the conclusion of WWII, though they would divorce before the end of the decade.

In the 1950s Vazquez had had three children, a son and two daughters. She had her son Gabriel with Edward Lewison in 1954, her daughter Janice with medical doctor Jose Vigoreux in 1955, and her daughter Carol with her second husband Paul E. Giguere in 1957. While in Puerto Rico, Vazquez and Giguere had divorced by the end of the decade, after which Vazquez reunited with Figueroa who had himself also divorced from his second wife. After reuniting, the couple remarried in 1963 and remained together until Figueroa's death in 1969. Vazquez cared for Figueroa as his health declined during his final years.

In 2022 Vazquez turned 100, leading to a resurgence of interest in her life and career and additional several honors and recognitions from public figures and organizations.

Vazquez died in Tallahassee, Florida on March 8, 2025, at the age of 103. She was buried at Santa María Magdalena de Pazzis Cemetery in San Juan, Puerto Rico alongside her husband Leopoldo Figueroa.

== Military service decorations ==
Among Vazquez's service awards and decorations are:

- Women's Army Corps Service Medal
- American Campaign Medal
- WWII Victory Medal
- National Defense Service Medal
- Overseas Service Bars (3)

== Legacy and civilian honors ==
After retiring from military service, Vazquez was honored and recognized by several organizations, institutions and government bodies.

On November 7, 2009, Vazquez was honored with a Proclamation from the New York State Senate. On the month of her 90th birthday, she was honored with a Resolution from the Senate of Puerto Rico on February 23, 2012. Vazquez was also a past recipient of the Medal of Distinction from the American Legion, Post 113.

In 2012 she was included in the book Dr. Leopoldo Figueroa, El Ideario de un Decano 1889 – 1969, published by the Office of the Official Historian of Puerto Rico.

Vazquez received renewed recognition on her 100th birthday in 2022, during which her service was honored by public officials, civic groups, media, and the Florida Department of Veterans Affairs. Puerto Rico's Resident Commissioner in the U.S. House of Representatives, Jenniffer González, honored Vazquez by entering a Statement into the Congressional Record of the United States Congress and having an American Flag flown over the United States Capitol in honor of her service with an accompanying statement reading "Her service, character, and pioneering spirit are a beacon to us all" (flag record: 2022–011123–01). Former Congressman, Governor, and then-Gubernatorial candidate Charlie Crist published a letter to Vazquez on social media marking her 100th birthday and paying tribute to her service.

In July, Vazquez was awarded the League of United Latin American Citizens (LULAC) Presidential Medal of Freedom, the organization's highest honor, during the 2022 LULAC conference in San Juan, Puerto Rico.

Records on Vazquez's military career are held in the Women's Military Memorial (reference Member ID: 511557).

Vazquez's death in 2025 was covered with an in-depth life profile by the Tallahassee Democrat, which was republished by Yahoo News. The story of her death was subsequently covered in Spanish by Diario Las Americas, the second oldest Spanish language newspaper in the United States.

== See also ==
- Leopoldo Figueroa
- Carmen Contreras-Bozak
- Carmen Lozano Dumler
- Carmen García Rosado
- List of Puerto Ricans
- List of Puerto Rican military personnel
- Puerto Rican women in the military
- Puerto Ricans in World War II
- Military history of Puerto Rico
- History of women in Puerto Rico
