= Carlota Matienzo =

Puerto Rican teacher and feminist

Carlota Matienzo Román
- Born: June 14, 1881; Barcelona, Spain
- Died: July 31, 1926 (aged 45); Queens, New York, US
- Education: University of Puerto Rico
- Occupation: teacher
- Known for: seeking reform of Puerto Rican public school system; founding member of Women's Aid Society of Puerto Rico

Carlota Matienzo Román (June 14, 1881– July 31, 1926) was a Puerto Rican teacher and feminist. She is credited with working for reform of the public school system in Puerto Rico, and as one of the founders in 1917 of the Puerto Rican Feminine League and in 1921 of the Suffragist Social League.

== Early life and education ==
Carlota Matienzo Román was born in Barcelona, where her mother and father met and married (while her father was in law school). He was Rosendo Matienzo Cintrón from Luquillo, Puerto Rico and her mother was Carlota Román. In the beginning of the 1880s, the family returned to Puerto Rico from Barcelona. They settled in Mayagüez, where her father built his law practice and became active in politics. In 1904 he was elected from the district as a member of the House of Representatives of Puerto Rico.

In 1907, Carlota Matienzo graduated from the University of Puerto Rico, among the first cohort of graduates after the founding of the university. She subsequently went to New York City for graduate work, where she studied philosophy at Columbia University. She returned to Puerto Rico to become a teacher.

== Career ==
In her professional life, Matienzo worked on reform in the public school system in Puerto Rico in order to extend education to all classes of children.

She also became active in other political issues. The Puerto Rican Feminine League, the first organization of its type to work for women's rights, was founded in 1917 by women of the "propertied, professional and intellectual elite", including Ana Roque de Duprey, Ángela Negrón Muñoz, and Matienzo, who were all teachers. In this period women's rights groups were active throughout Latin America as well as in the United States.

In 1921, Carlota Matienzo was one of the founders as the group changed its name to the Suffragist Social League and began to work directly for women's voting rights. Its members included medical doctors, writers and other intellectuals. She helped organize major conferences in San Juan, Ponce, Puerto Rico, and Arecibo. She was among the leaders who took women's concerns to the legislature. After allying with the Popular Feminist Association of Working Women of Puerto Rico, the League supported universal suffrage.

Matienzo Román continued as one of the League's prominent members until 1924, when it divided into two organizations, split largely along grounds of political party affiliation of its leaders. Those who remained with the League favored the Pure Republican Party and the Republican-Socialist Coalition. The dissidents recruited members from the Union Party and Republican-Unionist Alliance.

Matienzo Román next became a founding member of the Women's Aid Society of Puerto Rico. She worked directly to provide solutions to problems faced by women.

== Death ==
Carlota Matienzo Román died on July 31, 1926, in Queens, New York, and was buried at the Old Luquillo Municipal Cemetery in Luquillo, Puerto Rico.

== Legacy and honors ==
- The University of Puerto Rico posthumously named a hall in her honor at the campus. In addition, it established the annual Carlota Matienzo Prize, which is awarded to graduates who demonstrate outstanding ability in teaching.
- In the late 20th century, Matienzo was one of 999 women selected by American artist Judy Chicago for her installation, The Dinner Party (1979), premiered at the Brooklyn Museum.
