= Tulio Larrínaga =

Puerto Rican politician (1847–1917)

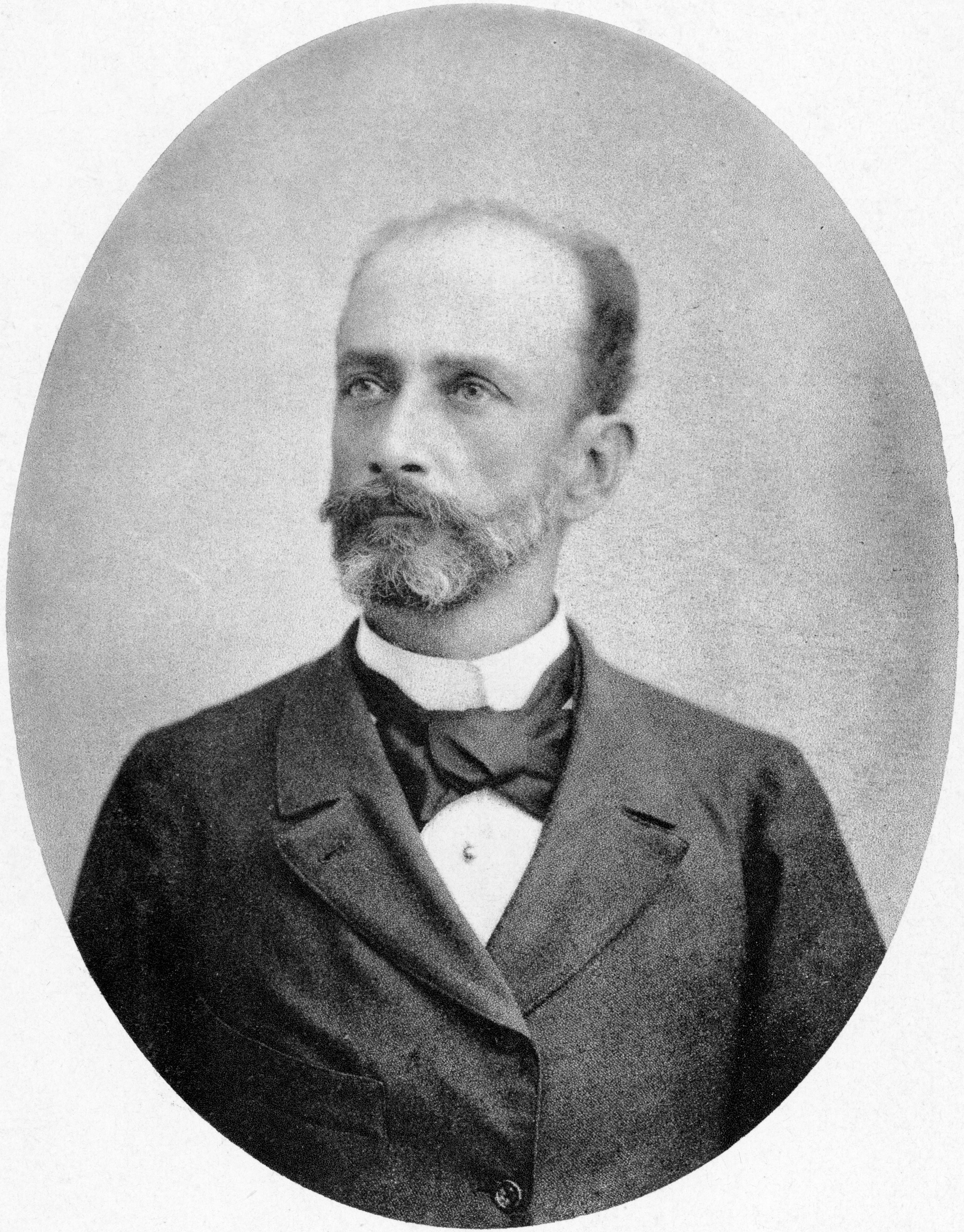
- Portrait of Larrínaga in 1895

Resident Commissioner of Puerto Rico
- In office March 4, 1905 – March 3, 1911
- Preceded by: Federico Degetau
- Succeeded by: Luis Muñoz Rivera

Personal details
- Born: January 15, 1847 Trujillo Alto, Captaincy General of Puerto Rico
- Died: April 28, 1917 (aged 70) San Juan, Puerto Rico
- Resting place: Cementerio Municipal de Mayagüez
- Party: Federal; Union
- Spouse: Berthy Goyro Saint Victor
- Children: 4
- Education: University of Pennsylvania (BS)

Tulio Larrínaga (January 15, 1847 – April 28, 1917) was an American politician who served as Resident Commissioner of Puerto Rico from 1905 to 1911, as a member of the Union Party. He was a civil engineer that worked on the Grand Central Terminal in the United States and the first railroad in Puerto Rico.

== Early life and education ==
Tulio Larrínaga was born in Trujillo Alto, Captaincy General of Puerto Rico, on January 15, 1847. He attended the Seminario Consiliar of San Ildefonso. He studied civil engineering at the Rensselaer Polytechnic Institute from 1865 to 1868, and graduated from the University of Pennsylvania in 1871.

== Career ==
=== Spanish rule ===
Larrínaga worked as an engineer in the United States before returning to Puerto Rico in 1872. In the United States he worked for the firm that constructed the Grand Central Terminal. He was appointed as the architect of San Juan. A railroad from San Juan to Río Piedras, the first railroad in Puerto Rico, was constructed by Larrínaga in 1880.

Larrínaga was one of the founding members of the Ateneo Puertorriqueño in 1876.

Puerto Rico was given autonomy and Larrínaga was appointed assistant secretary of the interior in the autonomous government in 1898.

=== American rule ===
The Federal Party, which supported Puerto Rico becoming an American territory with autonomy, was formed by Luis Muñoz Rivera and Larrínaga in 1900. He joined the Union Party in 1904.

Larrínaga was elected to the House of Delegates from the district of Arecibo in 1902. As an Unionist candidate he was elected Resident Commissioner of Puerto Rico in 1904, 1906, and 1908. He was a delegate to the 3rd Pan-American Conference in 1906. From 1913 to 1917, he was a member of the Executive Council of Puerto Rico.

== Death ==
Larrínaga married Berthy Goyro Saint Victor, with whom he had four children, in 1879. He died due to heart issues in Santurce, San Juan, on April 28, 1917, and was buried in the Cementerio Municipal de Mayagüez.

== Political positions ==
Larrínaga appealed to President Theodore Roosevelt to give Puerto Rico more self-government. He unsuccessfully asked Roosevelt to appoint a Puerto Rican as the administrator of the territory in 1907. Larrínaga supported legislation to grant American citizenship to Puerto Ricans.

== See also ==
- List of Hispanic Americans in the United States Congress

== Works cited ==
- "Larrínaga, Tulio". United States House of Representatives. Archived from the original on May 31, 2026.

U.S. House of Representatives
Preceded by Federico Degetau	Resident Commissioner of Puerto Rico; 1905–1911	Succeeded by Luis Muñoz Rivera
