= María Luisa Arcelay =

Puerto Rican politician and businesswoman

Member of the Puerto Rico House of Representatives from the 16th District (Mayagüez)
- In office January 2, 1933 – January 2, 1941

Personal details
- Born: December 7, 1894 Mayagüez, Puerto Rico
- Died: October 30, 1981 (aged 86) Mayagüez, Puerto Rico
- Party: Partido Unión Republicana Progresista; Puerto Rican Socialist Party

María Luisa Arcelay (December 7, 1894 – October 30, 1981), was an educator, businesswoman and politician. In November 1932, she became the first woman in Puerto Rico and Latin America to be elected to a government legislative body, when she was elected to represent the district of Mayagüez in the House of Representatives of Puerto Rico.

== Early years ==
Arcelay was one of five children born to Ricardo Arcelay and Isabel de la Rosa in Mayagüez, Puerto Rico. There she graduated as an elementary level English teacher from the Normal School in Rio Piedras, where she earned her teachers certificate.

== Educator ==
Arcelay began her career as an educator when she was hired as an English language teacher at Theodore Roosevelt High School. Later she taught at the Jose de Diego High School, both schools located in the city of Mayagüez. During her spare time she worked as a bookkeeper for various commercial firms in the area.

== Businesswoman and politician ==
By 1920, Arcelay left her career as an educator and together with Lorenza Carrero founded a needlework workshop which evolved into a needlework factory. Her company employed many local women, who had no other means to sustain themselves economically. She was also an activist who defended the island's needlework industry in many public hearings. These hearings were held in Puerto Rico, and in New York City and Washington, D.C.

Arcelay was member of the Partido Coalicionista de Puerto Rico (The Puerto Rican Coalition Party). In the November 1932 elections, she was elected to represent the district of Mayagüez in the House of Representatives of Puerto Rico. This made Arcelay thereby the first Puerto Rican woman, and the first woman in all of Latin America, to be elected to a government legislative body.

Arcelay used her position as president of the Agriculture and Commerce Commission, to continue her defense of the needlework industry before local and federal authorities. She also played an instrumental role in making the industry (both its prices, and it products) compatible with the United States market, by opposing any minimum wage legislation for seamstresses and common workers.

In August 1932 the needleworkers went on strike, to request higher salaries for their work. Police, who were called to protect employer properties, killed and wounded some strikers who stoned the workshop of Arcelay. Puerto Rican musician Mon Rivera wrote a song titled Alo, Quien Llama? (Hello, Who's Calling?), sometimes also referred to as Que Será. which describes the seamstress' strike and mentions Arcelay in the song.

In 1934, Arcelay presented a bill before the Puerto Rican legislature which established the Lottery of Puerto Rico. She was re-elected in 1936, during which time she introduced the bills to establish an orphanage and a juvenile court. She also presented bills to establish a teachers' pension and a School of Medicine at the University of Puerto Rico at Mayagüez. She was chairwoman of the Agriculture and Commerce Committee in the legislature and was a member of the Education and the Treasury and Labor committees,

Arcelay was named president of the Prices and Rationing Board No. 49 of Mayagüez, and was the director of the Victory bonds program in Puerto Rico during World War II. During the 1940s and 1950s, under her leadership, Puerto Rico's needlework industry grew to become the island's second-largest industry, behind agriculture.

== Legacy ==
Arcelay participated in civic organizations such as the Women's Civic and Cultural Club of Mayagüez, and was the founder of the Altrusa Club of that city. She served in the government until 1940 and, in 1965, retired from her business career.

She died on October 17, 1981, in her hometown Mayagüez and is buried in Mayagüez's Old Municipal Cemetery,. The city named a school in her honor. There is a portrait of Maria Luisa Arcelay at the Schlesinger Library on the History of Women in America. It is located in the Radcliffe Institute for Advanced Study in Harvard University.

On August 22, 2005, the Chamber of Representatives of Puerto Rico, by the act R.de la C. 2631, named a portion of Puerto Rico's Capital Building as the Maria Luisa Arecelay hall, in her honor.

On May 29, 2014, The Legislative Assembly of Puerto Rico honored 12 illustrious women with plaques in the "La Plaza en Honor a la Mujer Puertorriqueña" (Plaza in Honor of Puerto Rican Women) in San Juan. According to the plaques the following 12 women, who by virtue of their merits and legacies, stand out in the history of Puerto Rico. On May 29, 2014, The Legislative Assembly of Puerto Rico honored 12 illustrious women with plaques in the "La Plaza en Honor a la Mujer Puertorriqueña" (Plaza in Honor of Puerto Rican Women) in San Juan. According to the plaques the 12 women, who by virtue of their merits and legacies, stand out in the history of Puerto Rico. Arcelay was among those who were honored.

== See also ==
- List of Puerto Ricans
- History of women in Puerto Rico
