= Rosendo Matienzo Cintrón =

Puerto Rican politician

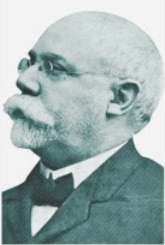
- Born: April 22, 1855; Luquillo, Puerto Rico
- Died: December 13, 1913 (aged 58); Luquillo, Puerto Rico
- Education: University of Barcelona (JD)
- Occupations: Lawyer, politician

Rosendo Matienzo Cintrón (April 22, 1855 – December 13, 1913) was a Puerto Rican lawyer and politician, a member of the Puerto Rican House of Representatives, and a lifelong political contrarian. He favored Puerto Rican autonomy when Puerto Rico was a Spanish possession. After the Spanish–American War, when the archipelago and island was ceded to the United States, he advocated statehood for Puerto Rico. In later years, Matienzo Cintrón supported Puerto Rico's independence.

== Early years ==
Matienzo Cintrón was born in the town of Luquillo, Puerto Rico where he received his primary and secondary education. He moved to Spain to continue his education at the University of Barcelona, and earned his law degree there in 1875. His daughter, Carlota Matienzo Román, was born in 1881 in Barcelona.

Upon his return to Puerto Rico with his wife and new daughter, he moved to the city of Mayagüez and established his law practice.

== Political career ==
In November 1885 Matienzo Cintrón was accused by the colonial government of being a Freemason, which was illegal as it was opposed by the state Catholic Church. He was briefly imprisoned. After his release, he ran for the position of provisional representative for the district of Mayagüez and was elected.

In 1887, Matienzo Cintrón assisted the Assembly of Autonomists in Teatro La Perla in the city of Ponce. During the assembly, Luis Muñoz Rivera proposed founding the Puerto Rican Autonomist Party. Matienzo Cintrón supported the proposal, and became one of the party's most prominent figures.

From the beginning, Matienzo Cintrón had some differences with Muñoz Rivera. At first he was against Muñoz Rivera's suggestion that their party make a pact with the Spanish Liberal Fusionist Party, headed by Práxedes Mateo Sagasta. Later he came to agree that such a pact would be to their benefit. Matienzo Cintrón was named to the commission which, along with Luis Muñoz Rivera, José Gómez Brioso and Federico Degetau, traveled to Spain to make official the pact with the Spanish Liberal Fusionist Party.

On February 12, 1897, the Puerto Rican Autonomist Party held an assembly in San Juan, where new suggestions to the pact made by Matienzo Cintrón were approved. He recommended renaming the Puerto Rican Autonomist Party as the Puerto Rican Liberal Fusionist Party. A group of members, headed by Dr. José Celso Barbosa, did not agree with some of the new by-laws, and consequently, the party divided into two factions.

In 1898, the United States declared war against Spain in what is known as the Spanish–American War. The United States forces under the command of Major General Nelson A. Miles invaded Puerto Rico via the town of Guanica in a military operation known as the Puerto Rico Campaign. Miles and his men were officially greeted that following August by a committee headed by Matienzo Cintrón, who provided the general with a banquet in his honor. Miles named Matienzo Cintrón President of the Ponce Audience, a position which he held until 1899.

== Puerto Rican Republican Party ==
On July 4, 1899, Barbosa founded the pro-statehood Puerto Rican Republican Party and Matienzo Cintrón became a member. Although he belonged to the executive counsel of the party, Cintrón still had personal differences with Barbosa. He quit the party.

Together with Luis Muñoz Rivera (who had returned from a self exile in New York City), Antonio R. Barceló, Eduardo Georgetti, and José de Diego, he founded the Union of Puerto Rico Party. Their political ideology was based on repeal of the Foraker Act, and the enhancement of Puerto Rican autonomy, as a pathway to full independence.

On June 5, 1900, President William McKinley named Matienzo Cintrón, together with José Celso Barbosa, José de Diego, Manuel Camuñas and Andrés Crosas to an Executive Cabinet under U.S.-appointed Governor Charles H. Allen, the first civilian governor of Puerto Rico. The Executive Cabinet also included six American members.

== Later years ==
In 1904, Matienzo Cintrón was elected to the Puerto Rico House of Representatives from the district of Humacao. In 1906 and 1908, he was elected to represent the district of Mayagüez. He served as Presidente de la Camara (President of the Chamber) from 1905 to 1906.

In 1912, Matienzo Cintrón became convinced the party was not doing enough to promote Puerto Rico's independence. He left to organize another party, the Partido de la Independencia. On February 8, 1912, together with Luis Lloréns Torres, Manuel Zeno Gandía and others, he wrote a manifesto demanding the independence of Puerto Rico from the United States.

The Independence Party, which also included Eugenio Benítez Castaño and Pedro Franceschi as founding members, was the first party in the history of Puerto Rico to establish an absolute and non-negotiable demand for Puerto Rican independence. In this manner, the Independence Party established a precedent for future organizations with similar ideologies.

== Legacy ==
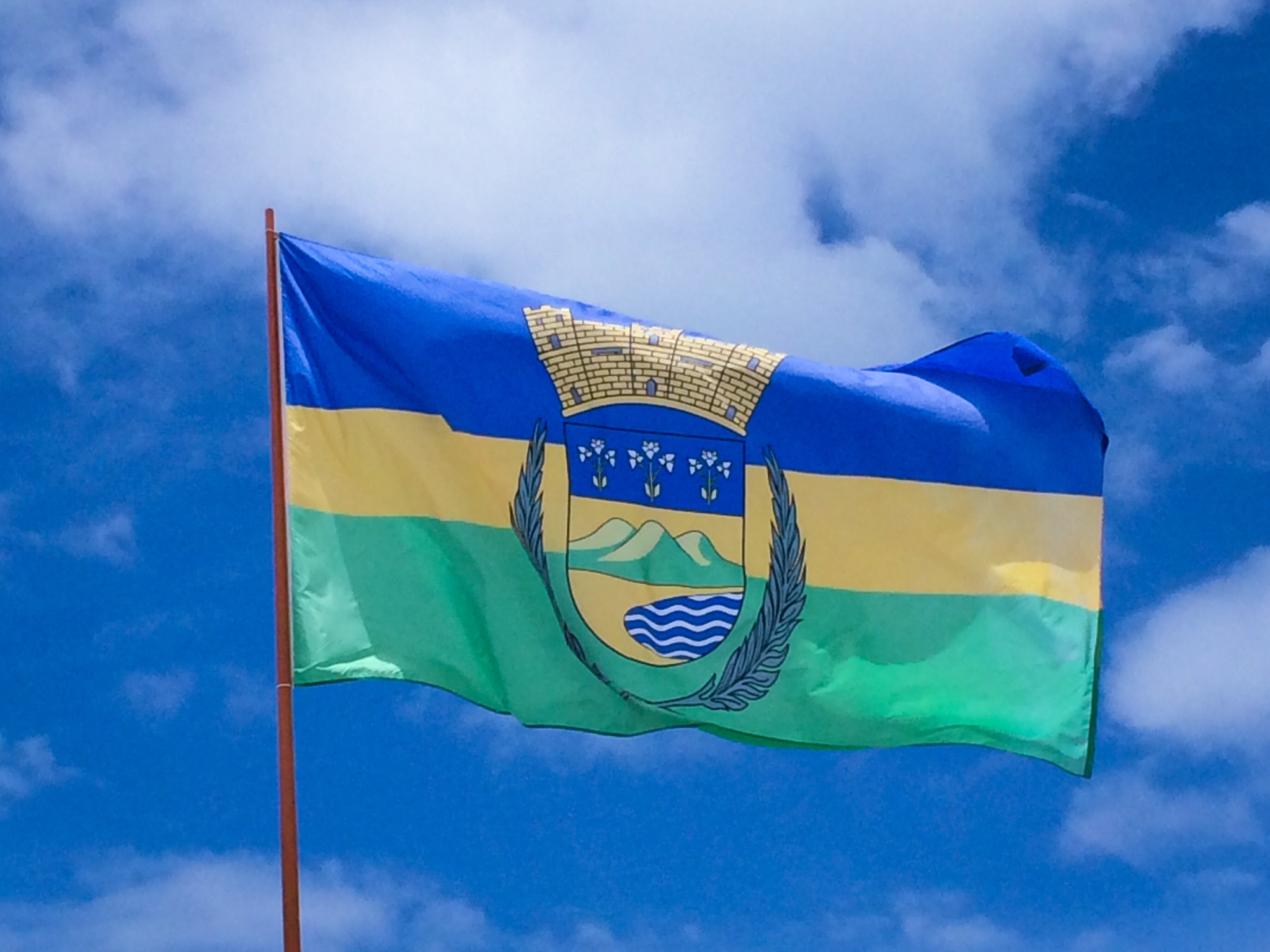
Luquillo flag being flown in the Plaza de Recreo Rosendo Matienzo Cintrón during the 9th Festival del Tinglar

Matienzo Cintrón died on December 13, 1913, in his hometown of Luquillo and was buried at Old Luquillo Municipal Cemetery. The government of Puerto Rico honored his memory by naming an elementary school in the town of Sabana Grande, and a plaza in Luquillo, after him.

== See also ==
- List of Puerto Ricans
- House of Representatives of Puerto Rico

== Notes ==
Political offices
Preceded by Manuel F. Rossy Calderón	Speaker of the Puerto Rico House of Representatives; 1905–1906	Succeeded by Francisco P. Acuña y Paniagua
