= Independence Association of Puerto Rico =

Political organization whose members favored Puerto Rican independence

The Independence Association of Puerto Rico (Asociación Independentista) was a political organization whose members favored Puerto Rican independence and which played an important role in the formation of the Puerto Rican Nationalist Party. It was active from 1920 until 1922.

== History ==
In 1920, Dr. Leopoldo Figueroa became disillusioned with the Union Party of Puerto Rico's leadership and together with José S. Alegría (father of Ricardo Alegría) and Eugenio Font Suárez co-founded the Independence Association (Asociación Independentista).

José Coll y Cuchí, who belonged to the Union Party of Puerto Rico, felt that the Union Party was not doing enough for the cause of Puerto Rican independence and together with his followers quit the party and founded the Nationalist Association of Puerto Rico (Asociación Nacionalista de Puerto Rico) in San Juan in 1919.

The Nationalist Association had a youth group called the "Juventud Nacionalista" (Nationalist Youth) which was at that time presided by José Paniagua. The Nationalist Youth was then composed of students from the University of Puerto Rico and High School students.

On September 17, 1922, the Independence Association merged with Coll y Cuchí's Nationalist Association of Puerto Rico and the Nationalist Youth (Juventud Nacionalista) political organizations to form the Puerto Rican Nationalist Party.
