= Federico Degetau =

Puerto Rican politician (1862–1914)

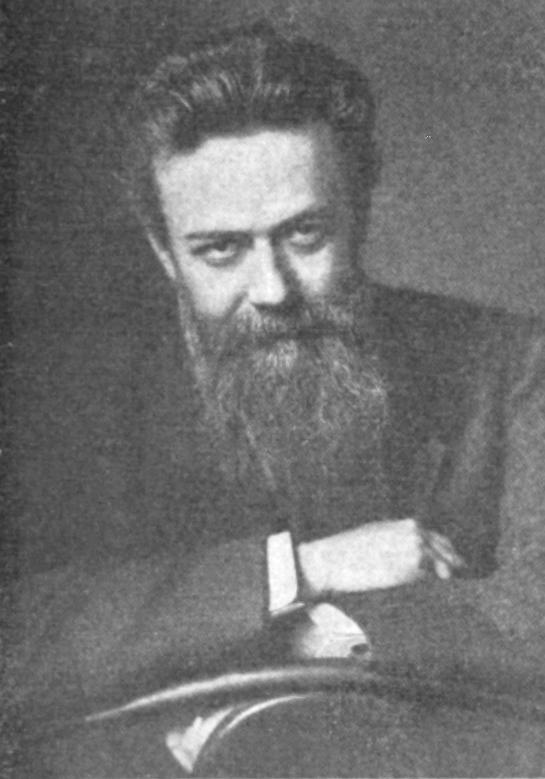

Resident Commissioner of Puerto Rico
- In office March 4, 1901 – March 3, 1905
- Preceded by: Position established
- Succeeded by: Tulio Larrínaga

Personal details
- Born: Federico Degetau y González; December 5, 1862 Ponce, Puerto Rico
- Died: January 20, 1914 (aged 51) Santurce, Puerto Rico
- Party: Republican
- Education: Complutense University (LLB)

Federico Degetau y González (December 5, 1862 – February 20, 1914) was a Puerto Rican politician, lawyer, writer, author, and the first Resident Commissioner of Puerto Rico to the United States House of Representatives.

== Early years ==
Degetau was born in 1862 in the city of Ponce, Puerto Rico, where he also attended the common schools and the Central College of Ponce. His father was Mathias Degetau, son of a wealthy Hamburg family. In Ponce, Mathias managed the banks of the Overman and Dede House, of which his father, Otto Georg Christian Degetau (Federico's grandfather), was a partner. Federico's mother was María Consolación González, daughter of a respected San Juan family. His parents married in 1851.

Degetau completed an academic course at Barcelona, Spain, and was graduated from the law department of the Universidad Complutense de Madrid. He was admitted to the bar and commenced practice in Madrid, Spain. He founded the newspaper La Isla de Puerto Rico to communicate the plight of Puerto Rico to the colonial power.

== Political career ==
Degetau returned to Puerto Rico, and was one of the four commissioners sent by Puerto Rico under Luis Muñoz Rivera to petition Spain for autonomy in 1895. Eventually, the petition was accepted by Práxedes Mateo Sagasta's government. He settled in San Juan, Puerto Rico and continued to practice law.

Degetau was a member of the municipal council of San Juan in 1897, and mayor of San Juan in 1898. He was deputy to the Spanish Cortes Generales of 1898. After the Spanish–American War, he was appointed by the military governor General Guy Vernor Henry as the Secretary of the Interior in the first cabinet formed under American rule in Puerto Rico, in 1899. He was appointed by General Henry's successor, General George W. Davis, as a member of the Insular Board of Charities.

== Resident Commissioner ==
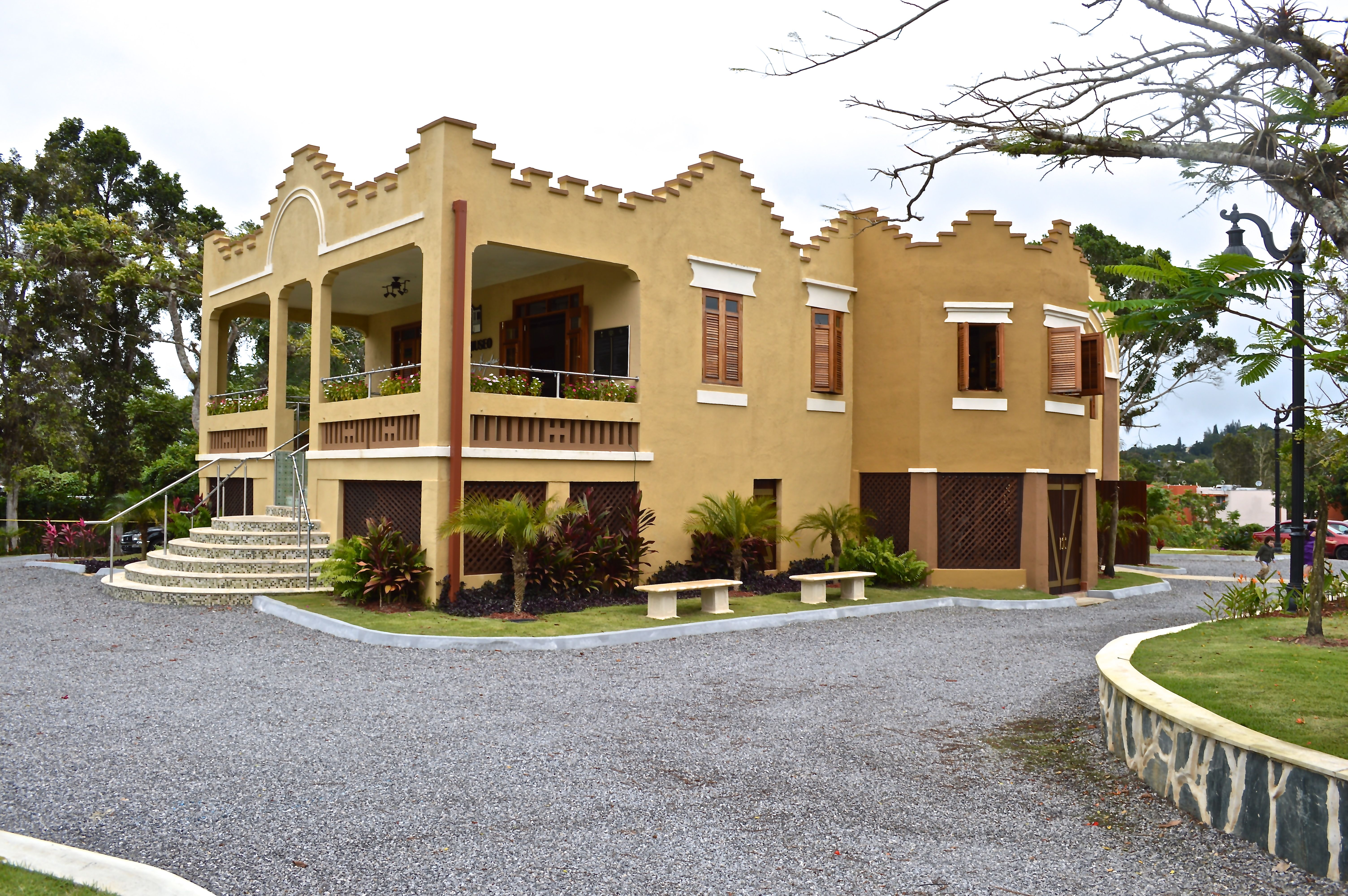
Federico Degetau's former home in Aibonito, now a museum

Degetau became a member of the Insular Republican Party, which was founded in 1899. He was the first vice president of the municipal council of San Juan in 1899 and 1900, and was president of the Board of Education of San Juan in 1900 and 1901. He was elected as a Puerto Rican Republican to the Resident Commissioner post in 1900, and reelected in 1902. He served from March 4, 1901 until March 3, 1905, in the Fifty-sixth, Fifty-seventh, and Fifty-eighth Congresses. In a lecture delivered in 1902 to the Columbian University, today George Washington University, Degetau summarized his political ideals on the status of Puerto Rico:

The Porto Rican People have clearly understood that by its geographical position, as well as by its history, the Island is, in fact, an integral part of the American Union. For this reason the political parties of the Island inscribed in their respective platforms the unanimous aspiration of the people to become and organized territory, with the certainty of soon being admitted as a State of the American Union.

[…] The American flag can perhaps be lowered in the distant Philippines. It must be maintained in the neighboring Island, with the institutions of liberty and justice that it represents.

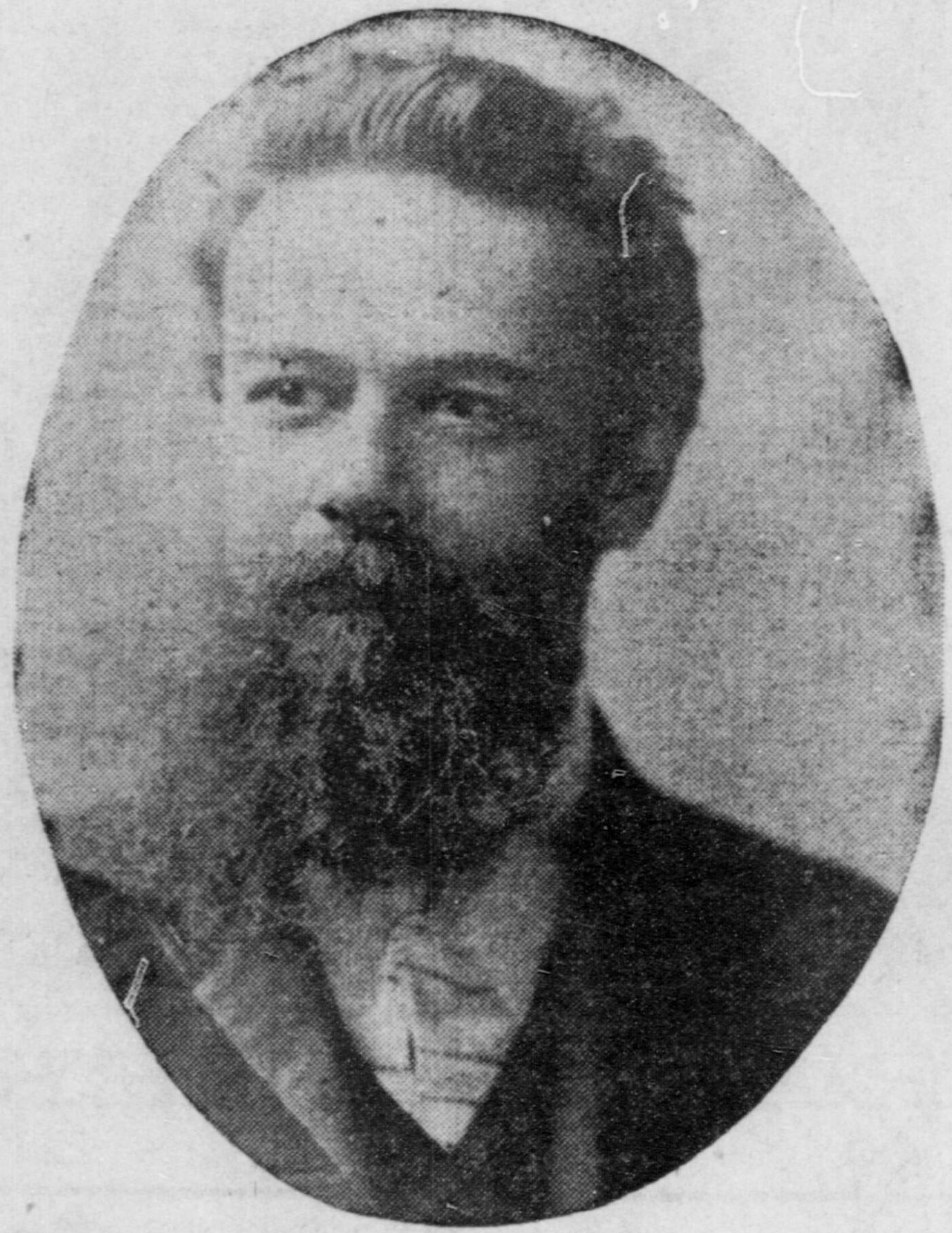
Federico Degetau, delegate to Congress elected in January 1901

While serving Congress, Degetau was a member of the Committee on Insular Affairs, and submitted a bill to grant United States citizenship to Puerto Rico residents, which failed. He was not a candidate for renomination in 1904, and resumed the practice of law. Before leaving office as Resident Commissioner Degetau gave a speech to the House of Representatives where, in addition to pleading for United States citizenship for Puerto Ricans, a matter he viewed would be resolved in the courts, he asserted his loyalty to the Constitution:

I do not know, Mr. Chairman, I do not know, my friends, in this patriotic relation anything superior, anything higher than the American Constitution. I do not conceive anything more sacred that the oath to support it.

== United States Supreme Court: Gonzales v. Williams ==
In 1905, after traveling through Europe where he purchased a collection of paintings, Degetau moved to Puerto Rico and established his residence in the town of Aibonito where he managed a coffee plantation.

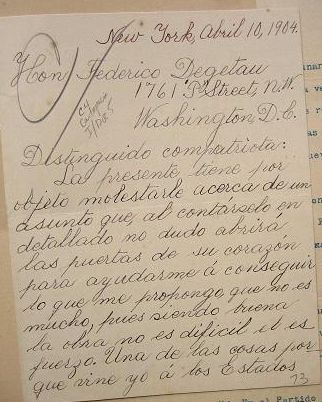
Letter written by Isabel Gonzalez to Federico Degetau in April 1904

In 1902, the United States Treasury Department issued new immigration guidelines that changed the immigration status of all Puerto Ricans. Isabel González, a young, but pregnant, single Puerto Rican woman was traveling aboard the S.S. Philadelphia when the new immigration guidelines took effect and she was detained at Ellis Island as an "alien" and "burden" to the state. She lost her appeals in the Board hearings and took her case to the U.S. Supreme Court.

Meanwhile, on August 30 of that year, Federico Degetau, unaware of the Gonzalez situation, wrote to the U. S. Secretary of State in protest of the new rules subjecting Puerto Ricans to immigration laws. His protest was forwarded to the U.S. Treasury Department. Degetau then contacted Le Barbier and Parker, who informed him that they planned to appeal González's case to the U.S. Supreme Court.

Once Isabel lost her administrative appeal, switching tactics and focusing instead on the "public charge" issue, she decided to argue that all Puerto Ricans were citizens of the United States and as such should not be detained, treated as aliens, or denied entry into the United States.

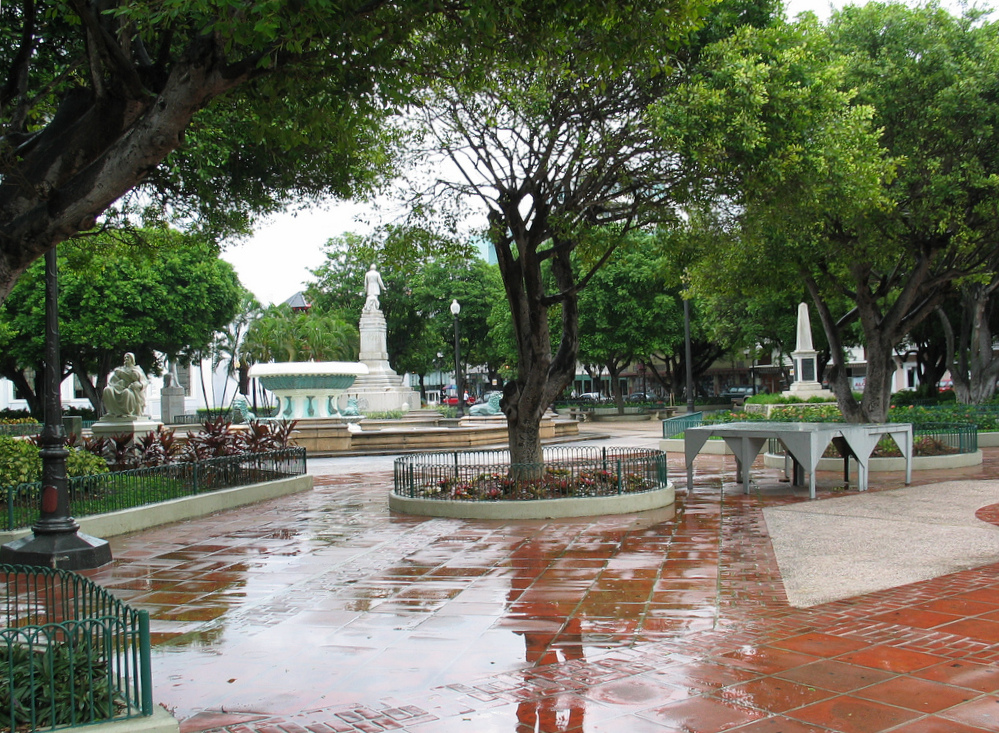
Plaza Federico Degetau in Ponce

Degetau saw in the Isabel González case, the perfect "test case" for challenging the new immigration guidelines because now it would not be about whether immigration inspectors, following guidelines suffused with concepts of race and gender, deemed Isabel Gonzalez and her family desirable, but about settling the status of all the native islanders living in Puerto Rico at the time it was annexed by the United States four years earlier. By February 16, 1903, Frederic René Coudert, Jr., an international-law attorney from New York who launched the Downes v. Bidwell case for clients protesting tariffs levied on goods shipped between Puerto Rico and the United States, joined Paul Fuller, Charles E. LeBarbier and Federico Degetau in the Gonzalez case as collaborators.

The groundbreaking case, which became known as Gonzales v. Williams, was argued in the U.S. Supreme Court on December 4 and 7, 1903 and was presided by Chief Justice Melville Weston Fuller. The case sparked the administrative, legal, and media discussions about the status of Puerto Ricans. It also questioned the issues of immigration and U.S. doctrines in the treatment of U.S. citizens, chiefly women and people of color (dark-skinned). González and her lawyers moved among the legal realms, aided by shared languages of race, gender, and morality, while Williams and his lawyers, focused on what he considered were failed parents, rearing children outside moral, economically self-sufficient homes.

González, who was out on bond, secretly married her fiancé and thus became "a citizen of this country through marriage," and acquired the right to remain stateside. She could have ended her appeal but instead she decided to press her claim that all Puerto Ricans were U.S. citizens.

On January 4, 1904, the Court determined that under the immigration laws González was not an alien, and therefore could not be denied entry into New York. The court, however, declined to declare that she was a U.S. citizen. The question of the citizenship status of the inhabitants of the new island territories remained confusing, ambiguous, and contested. Puerto Ricans, instead, came to be known as something in between: "noncitizen nationals."

== Literary work ==
As an author, he wrote El secreto de la domadora in 1885, El fondo del aljibe in 1886, ¡Qué Quijote!, Cuentos para el camino in 1894, Juventud in 1895, and La Injuria in 1893.

== Death ==
Degetau died in Santurce, Puerto Rico, at the age of 51, and was interred in the Santa María Magdalena de Pazzis Cemetery in San Juan, Puerto Rico.

== Honors ==
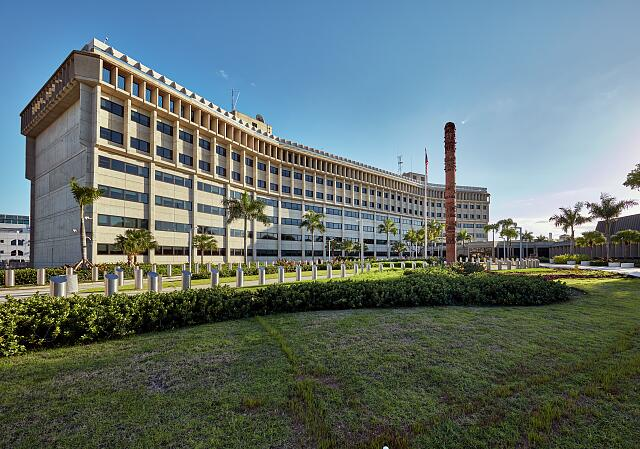
Federico Degetau Federal Building in Hato Rey

- The people of the municipality of Ponce named the larger of the two squares the city's central plaza, Plaza Degetau, in his honor.
- Degetau is also honored at Ponce's Park of Illustrious Ponce Citizens. He is also honored for his contributions to the field of literature. Together with Ramón Marín, Degetau is the only honoree to be honored in more than one field at that park.
- In 1914, three years after the 1911 opening of the College of Agriculture and Mechanical Arts in Mayagüez, the building called Edificio del Colegio de Agricultura ("College of Agriculture Hall") was renamed Edificio Degetau ("Degetau Hall") in 1914 in honor of Degetau who had just died. Four years later, Degetau Hall was destroyed by the Puerto Rico earthquake of 1918 with only the building's main entrance portico surviving. This ruin was renamed Pórtico Degetau ("Degetau Gate"), the name that perdures to this day (2021). Degetau Gate was chosen as official symbol for the school, and perdured after the school's name was changed to its current name (2021), University of Puerto Rico at Mayagüez.
- In 1977, the United States Congress passed an Act to designate the new Federal building in San Juan, the "Federico Degetau Federal Building". Following its enactment, the main building of the federal government in Puerto Rico bears his name.

== Aftermath ==
Degetau had no children and he wrote a will to establish a foundation whereby his widow and a friend would receive an usufruct in life of half of his property and the other half would be destined to "an institution of culture in this Island of Puerto Rico, as a library, museum". The beneficiaries of the trustees and beneficiaries of the trust soon became engaged in litigation. The failure of the Degetau trust to achieve its objective was caused in part because the U.S. institution known as a "foundation" did not exist in the Puerto Rican civil code. As a result, Degetau's will was never firmly established, and the corpus was almost completely lost. In 2004, the Municipality of Aibonito attempted to demolish the home of Federico Degetau in order to make room for further development. In response, the Patronato del Archivo Histórico of Aibonito and other organization in the community including the Puerto Rico Bar Association passed a resolution against the attempted demolition in the Supreme Court of Puerto Rico, and urged the government to take action. In 2010, the legislature of the Commonwealth of Puerto Rico passed a law designating Degetau's home and farm in Aibonito a historic site and ordered the preservation of the house known as Quinta Rosacruz. The Federico Degetau Trust thus materialized with the help of private and government funding.

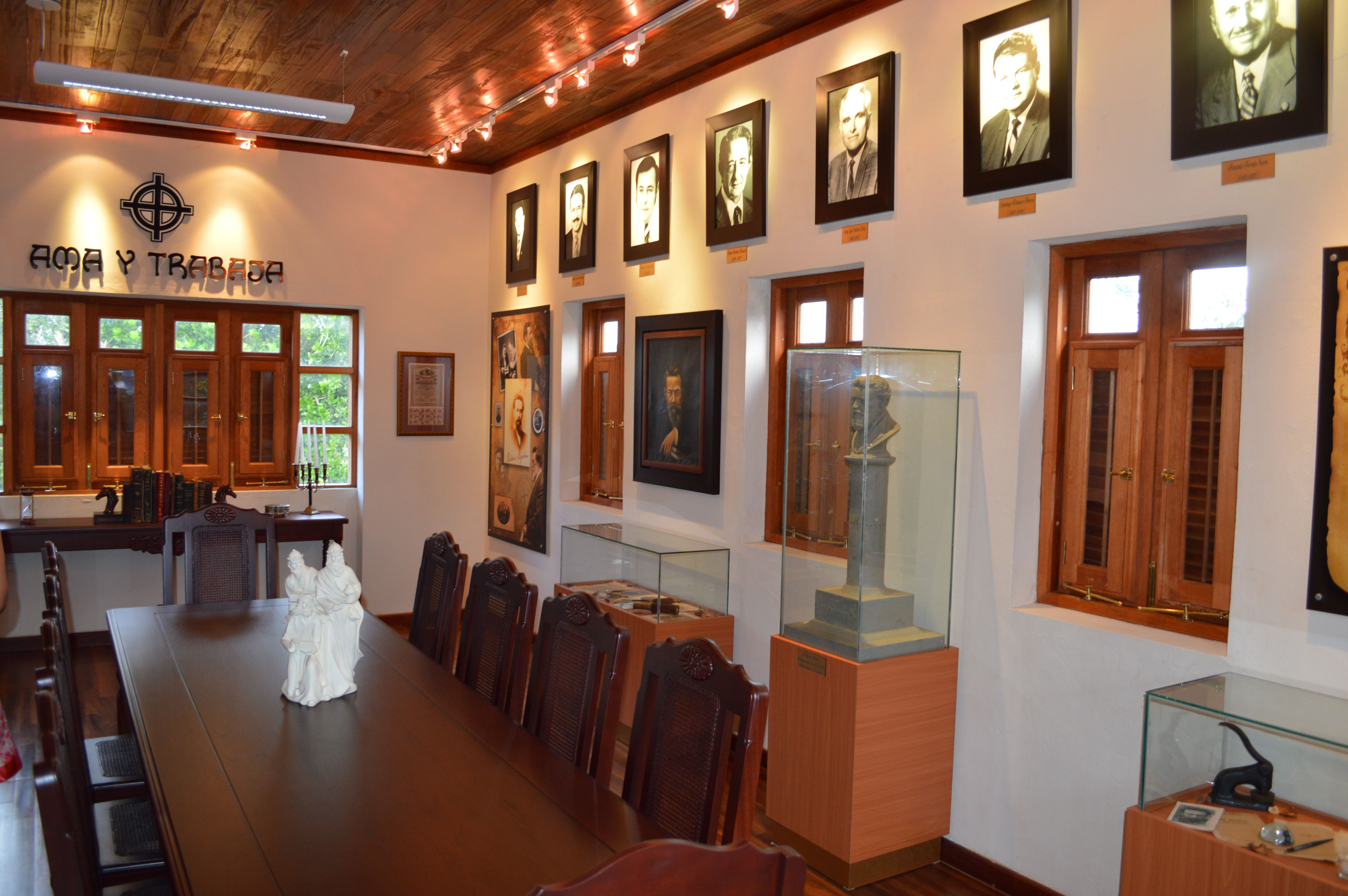
Rosacruz room at Federico Degetau House and Museum

== See also ==
- List of Puerto Ricans
- German immigration to Puerto Rico
- List of Hispanic Americans in the United States Congress

U.S. House of Representatives
New seat	Resident Commissioner of Puerto Rico; 1901–1905	Succeeded by Tulio Larrínaga
