= Federal Party (Puerto Rico) =

Former political party

The Federal Party (Spanish: Partido Federal) was a short-lived political party in Puerto Rico.

The Federal Party was founded on 1 October 1899 by Luis Muñoz Rivera and other former members of the Autonomist Party, when the island was under US military rule following the Spanish–American War.

The Federal Party supported greater self-rule for the island and clashed with the pro-statehood Republican Party. The party was regarded as including members of the former Spanish colonial elite: large sugar plantation owners and hacendados.

In February 1904, the party, now increasingly opposed to statehood, was reconstituted as the Union of Puerto Rico, or Unionist Party.
