= 1936 Puerto Rican general election =

1936 Puerto Rico elections
- November 3, 1936

General elections were held in Puerto Rico on 3 November 1936. Voter turnout was 72%.

Santiago Iglesias of the Coalition was elected Resident Commissioner with 54% of the vote.

== Results ==
=== Resident commissioner ===
Candidate	Party	Votes	%
Santiago Iglesias	Coalition	297,033	54.06
J.A. López-Antongiorgi	Liberal Party	252,467	45.94
Total		549,500	100.00
Registered voters/turnout		764,602	–
Source: Nolla, Nohlen

=== Senate ===
==== At-large senators ====
Candidate	Party	Votes	%	Notes
Bolívar Pagán	Socialist Party	143,653	26.46	Elected
Antonio Rafael Barceló	Liberal Party	89,202	16.43	Elected
María Martínez Acosta	Liberal Party	83,715	15.42	Elected
Alfonso Lastra Chárriez	Liberal Party	79,105	14.57	Elected
Rafael Martínez Nadal	Republican Union	68,854	12.68	Elected
Blas Herrero	Republican Union	42,676	7.86	
Ricarda López de Ramos Casellas	Republican Union	35,629	6.56	
Independents		14	0.00	
Total		542,848	100.00	
Registered voters/turnout		764,602	–	
Source: Nolla

==== District senators ====
Party	Class 1			Class 2			Total seats
Party	Votes	%	Seats	Votes	%	Seats	Total seats
Coalition	297,157	54.10	6	297,034	54.09	6	12
Liberal Party	252,158	45.90	1	252,126	45.91	1	2
Total	549,315	100.00	7	549,160	100.00	7	14
Registered voters/turnout	764,602	–		764,602	–		
Source: Nolla, Nohlen

=== House of Representatives ===
==== At-large representatives ====
Candidate	Party	Votes	%	Notes
Rafael Alonso Torres	Socialist Party	144,002	26.23	Elected
Rodolfo Ramírez Pabón	Liberal Party	128,686	23.44	Elected
Félix Ochoteco Junior	Liberal Party	122,204	22.26	Elected
Miguel A. García Méndez	Republican Union	83,697	15.25	Elected
Blas Herrero	Republican Union	70,395	12.82	
Independents		9	0.00	
Total		548,993	100.00	
Registered voters/turnout		764,602	–	
Source: Nolla

==== District representatives ====
Party	Votes	%	Seats
Coalition	297,126	54.09	25
Liberal Party	252,185	45.91	10
Total	549,311	100.00	35
Registered voters/turnout	764,602	–	
Source: Nolla, Nohlen
