= 1914 Puerto Rican general election =

1914 Puerto Rico elections
- November 3, 1914

General elections were held in Puerto Rico on November 3, 1914. At the time, Governor of Puerto Rico Arthur Yager was appointed by the President of the United States.

They were the last elections under the Foraker Act of 1900, and the last before Puerto Ricans were granted United States citizenship by the Jones–Shafroth Act of 1917. Suffrage was denied to women, with only men over 21 who owned property able to vote.

Luis Muñoz Rivera was re-elected as Resident Commissioner with 57% of the vote.

== Results ==
=== Resident Commissioner ===
Candidate	Party	Votes	%
Luis Muñoz Rivera	Union of Puerto Rico–Unionist Majority	117,169	57.40
Juan B. Soto	Republican Party	82,574	40.45
Santiago Iglesias	Insular Workers' Party	4,398	2.15
Total		204,141	100.00
Source: Nolla
