= Confederación General de Trabajadores =

There are several groups named Confederación General de Trabajadores:

- Confederación General de Trabajadores (Mexico)
- Confederación General de Trabajadores (Peru)
- Confederación General de Trabajadores (Puerto Rico)
