= Communist Refoundation =

Communist Refoundation may refer to:

- Communist Refoundation Party, a political party in Italy
- Sammarinese Communist Refoundation, a former political party in San Marino
- Communist Party of Puerto Rico, formerly named Communist Refoundation
