= 1908 Puerto Rican general election =

1908 Puerto Rico elections
- November 3, 1908

General elections were held in Puerto Rico in 1908. Tulio Larrínaga was re-elected as Resident Commissioner.

During the campaign, there were increased calls for Puerto Rico independence and expressions of hostility to the Foraker Act. The election resulted in a larger faction in the House of Representatives that called for greater autonomy for Puerto Rico. Luis Lloréns Torres was elected to the House. The newly elected House refused to pass any legislation unless the United States recognize Puerto Rico's right to self-government.

== Results ==
=== Resident Commissioner ===
Candidate	Party	Votes	%
Tulio Larrínaga	Union of Puerto Rico	101,033	64.22
Roberto H. Todd	Republican Party	54,962	34.94
Santiago Iglesias	Free Federation of Workers	1,326	0.84
Total		157,321	100.00
Source: Nolla
