= Puerto Rican Communist Party =

Political party

Puerto Rican Communist Party Partido Comunista Puertorriqueño
- Founded: 23 September 1934
- Dissolved: 1991
- Succeeded by: Communist Party of Puerto Rico
- Newspaper: Lucha Obrera ("Workers' Struggle")
- Ideology: Communism; Anti-imperialism; Puerto Rican independence
- Political position: Far-left
- Colors: Red

The Puerto Rican Communist Party (in Spanish: Partido Comunista Puertorriqueño, PCP) was a communist party in Puerto Rico founded on 23 September 1934 following the sugar strikes on the island that same year. Relevant members include General Secretary Alberto E. Sánchez, president Juan Santos Rivera, and Jose A. Lanauze Rolón. The party emerged from a turbulent political moment where faith in previous workers parties and organizations, such as the Socialist Party and the Free Federation of Workers, was waning and the Puerto Rican economy was experiencing a downturn. While membership remained small, the PCP interacted and influenced the labor and political space of mid-20th century Puerto Rico as well as political spaces outside of the island. These interactions include those with The Communist Party of the United States of America and the Nationalist Party of Puerto Rico.

== Political context ==
The PCP emerges following various worker and student led general strikes in 1934 and 1935.

In conjunction with the mid-1930s labor movements, the formation of the PCP was also internationally influenced. The Communist Party of the United States of America (CPUSA) was supportive of the PCP's founding with additional support from the Communist Party of Cuba (CPC). Indeed, there was a substantial interconnectedness between the CPUSA, Puerto Rican Communists in New York's Lower Manhattan, and the PCP.

== Political agenda, strategies, and relations with other political groups ==
The PCP utilized their newspaper periodical Lucha Obrera (Worker's Struggle) in order to communicate their agendas and messages to the public. The paper was brief, however, it served to document the PCP's ongoing movements and objectives.
