= Labor Party (Puerto Rico) =

Political party in Puerto Rico

- Leader: Santiago Iglesias Pantín
- Founder: Santiago Iglesias Pantín
- Founded: July 18, 1899
- Dissolved: March 21, 1915
- Succeeded by: Socialist Party
- Ideology: Laborism

The Labor Party (Spanish: Partido Obrero), also known as the Socialist Worker's Party (Spanish: Partido Obrero Socialista), was a political party in Puerto Rico from 1899 to 1915.

The party was founded on July 18, 1899 by Santiago Iglesias Pantín, an early leader of the Puerto Rican labor movement who was influenced by the Socialist Labor Party of America.

The Labor Party was formally re-organized as the Socialist Party on March 21, 1915, in the town of Cayey. It originally served as the political arm of the Free Federation of Workers, which became the Puerto Rican branch of the American Federation of Labor.
