= General Confederation of Workers =

General Confederation of Workers may refer to:

- General Confederation of Workers (Chile)
- General Confederation of Workers (Mexico)
- Confederação Geral dos Trabalhadores, General Confederation of Workers (Brazil)
- General Confederation of Workers (Puerto Rico)
