= Presidency of William Howard Taft =

U.S. presidential administration from 1909 to 1913

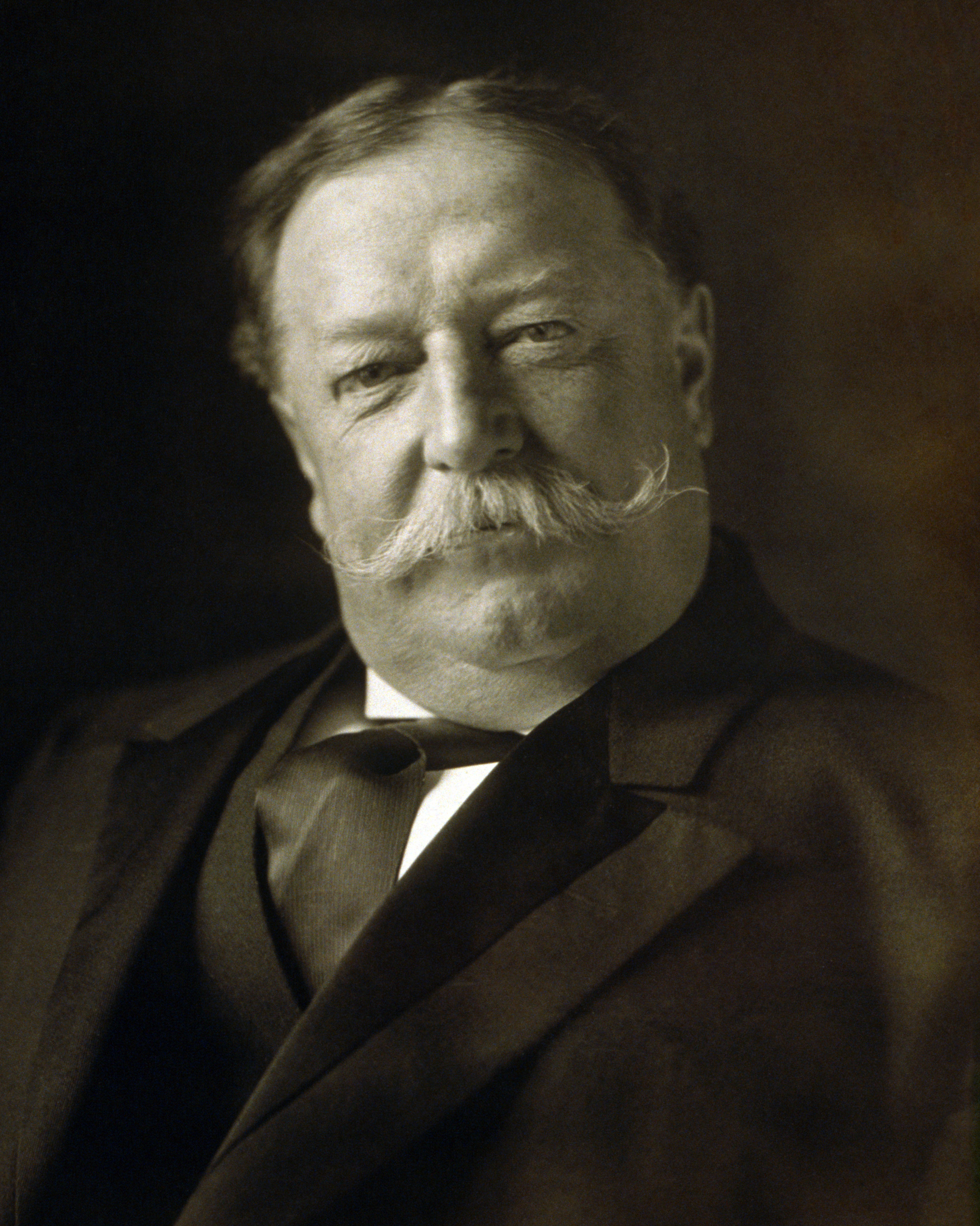
- Presidency of William Howard Taft; March 4, 1909 – March 4, 1913
- Vice President: James S. Sherman (1909–1912); None (1912–1913) (Note: Vice President Sherman died in office. As this was prior to the adoption of the Twenty-fifth Amendment in 1967, a vacancy in the office of vice president was not filled until the next election and inauguration.)
- Cabinet: See list
- Party: Republican
- Election: 1908
- Seat: White House
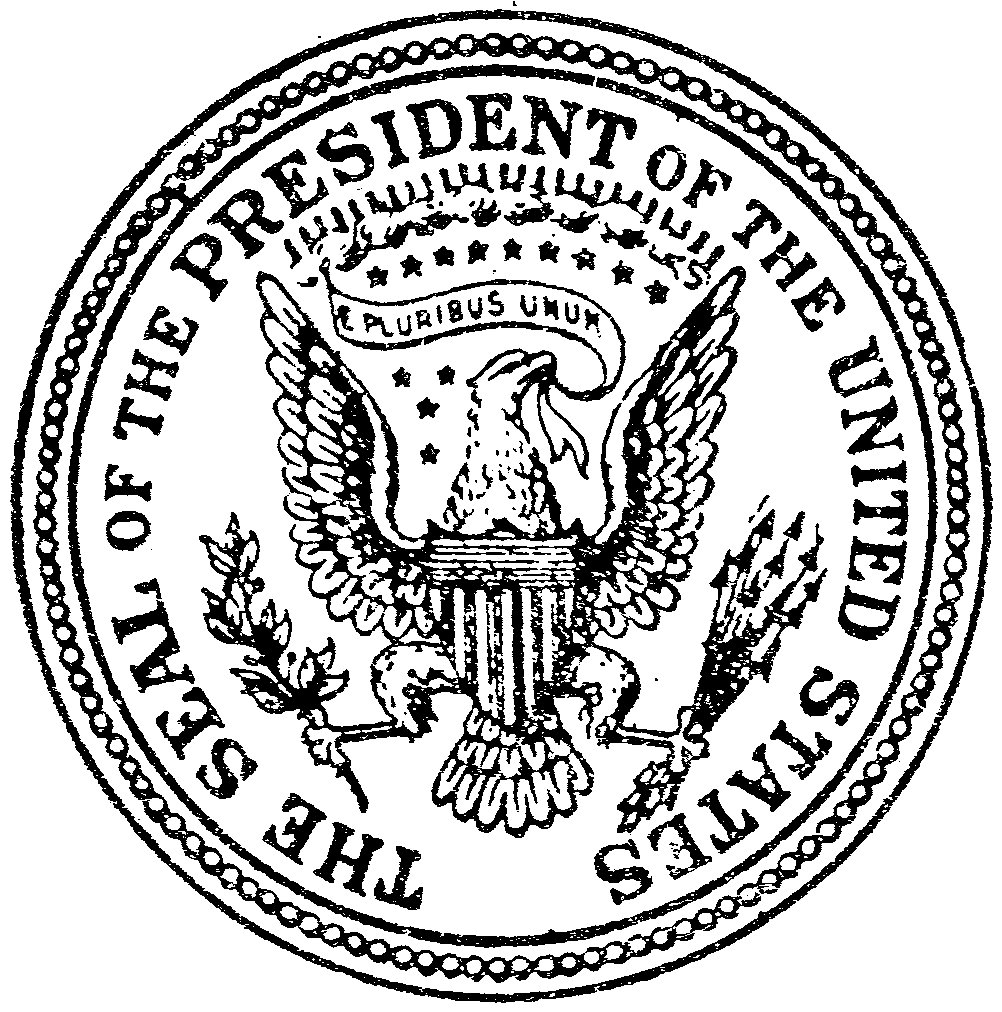
- Seal of the president (1894–1945)

William Howard Taft was the 27th president of the United States from March 4, 1909, to March 4, 1913. Taft, a Republican from Ohio, and the chosen successor of President Theodore Roosevelt, took office after defeating Democrat William Jennings Bryan in the 1908 presidential election. His presidency ended with his landslide defeat in the 1912 election by Democrat Woodrow Wilson, after one term in office.

Taft sought to lower tariffs—a tax on imports—then a major source of governmental income. However he was out-maneuvered. The new Payne–Aldrich Tariff Act of 1909 raised rates when most people expected reductions. Taft expanded Roosevelt's efforts to break up trusts, launching legal cases against U.S. Steel and other very large companies. Taft made six appointments to the United States Supreme Court, more than all but two other presidents. In foreign affairs, Taft focused on China and Japan, and repeatedly intervened to prop up or remove Latin American governments. It followed a policy of dollar diplomacy, using American banking investment to bolster influence in Latin America and China, with little success.

His administration was filled with conflict between the conservative wing of the Republican Party, with which Taft often sympathized, and the progressive wing, led by Theodore Roosevelt and Robert M. La Follette. Controversies over conservation and over antitrust cases filed by the Taft administration served to further separate Taft and Roosevelt. Roosevelt challenged Taft at the 1912 Republican National Convention, but Taft was able to use his control of the party machinery to narrowly win his party's nomination. After the convention, Roosevelt left the party, formed the Progressive Party, and ran against Taft and Wilson in the 1912 election. Roosevelt had already blocked LaFollette's ambitions, so he endorsed Wilson. The deep split among Republicans doomed Taft's re-election, giving Democrats control of the White House for the first time in sixteen years, as well as control of Congress. Historians generally consider Taft to have been an average president.

== Election of 1908 ==
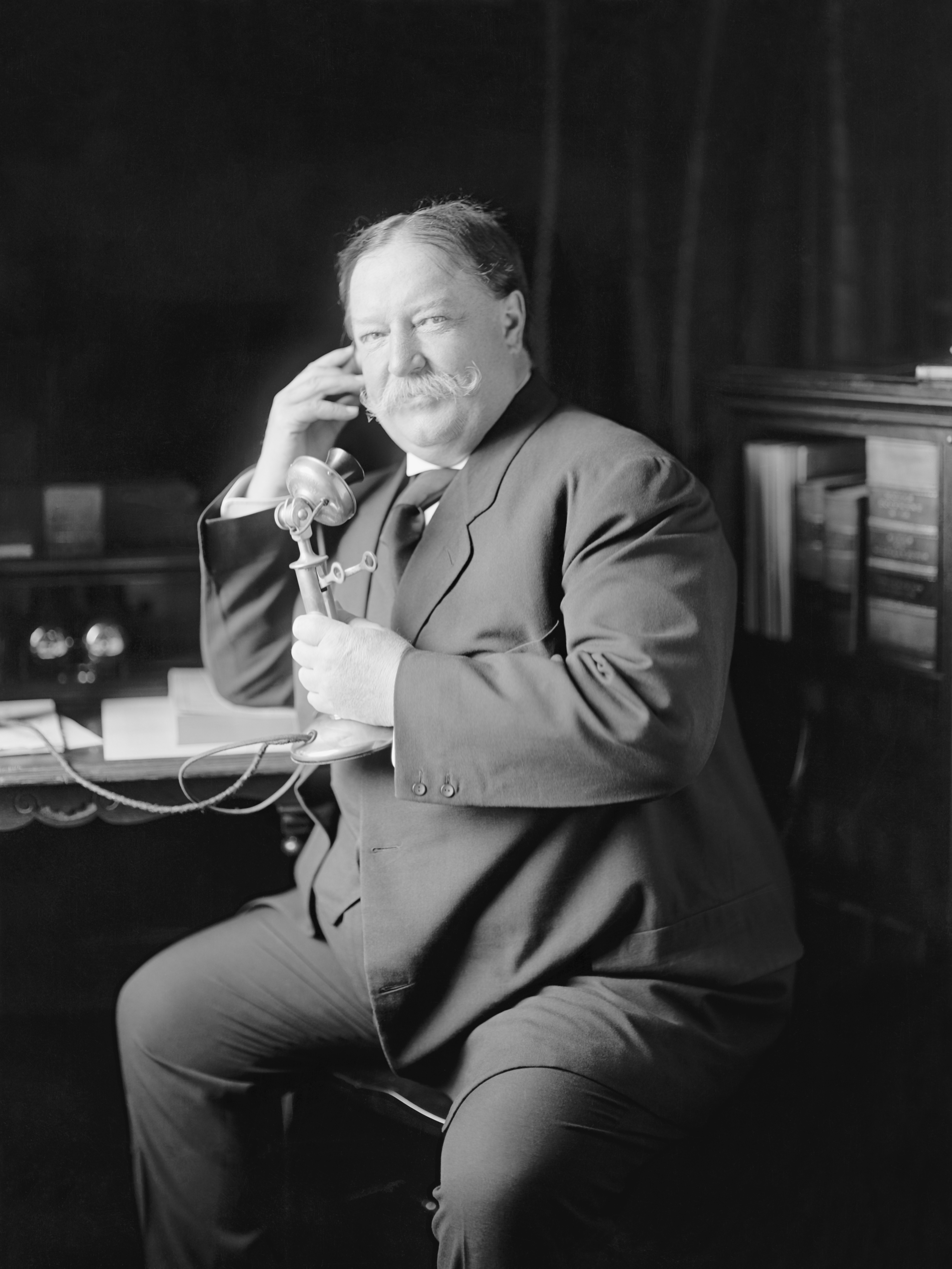
One of a series of candid photographs known as the Evolution of a Smile, as Taft learns by telephone from Roosevelt of his nomination for president

After his victory in the 1904 presidential election, Theodore Roosevelt announced that he would not seek re-election in 1908. Roosevelt considered Secretary of War Taft to be his logical successor, although Taft was initially reluctant to run, and would have preferred being appointed to the position of chief justice of the Supreme Court. Roosevelt used his control of the party machinery to aid his heir apparent, and Roosevelt's political appointees were required to support Taft or remain silent. A number of Republican politicians, such as Treasury Secretary George Cortelyou, tested the waters for a run, but chose to stay out. New York Governor Charles Evans Hughes ran, but when he made a major policy speech, Roosevelt took steps to minimize coverage of Hughes's candidacy. Taft faced no serious opposition at the 1908 Republican National Convention and he won the presidential nomination on the first ballot. Taft hoped his running mate would be a Midwestern progressive such as Iowa Senator Jonathan Dolliver, but instead the convention named Congressman James S. Sherman of New York, a conservative. Taft resigned as Secretary of War on June 30 to devote himself full-time to the campaign.

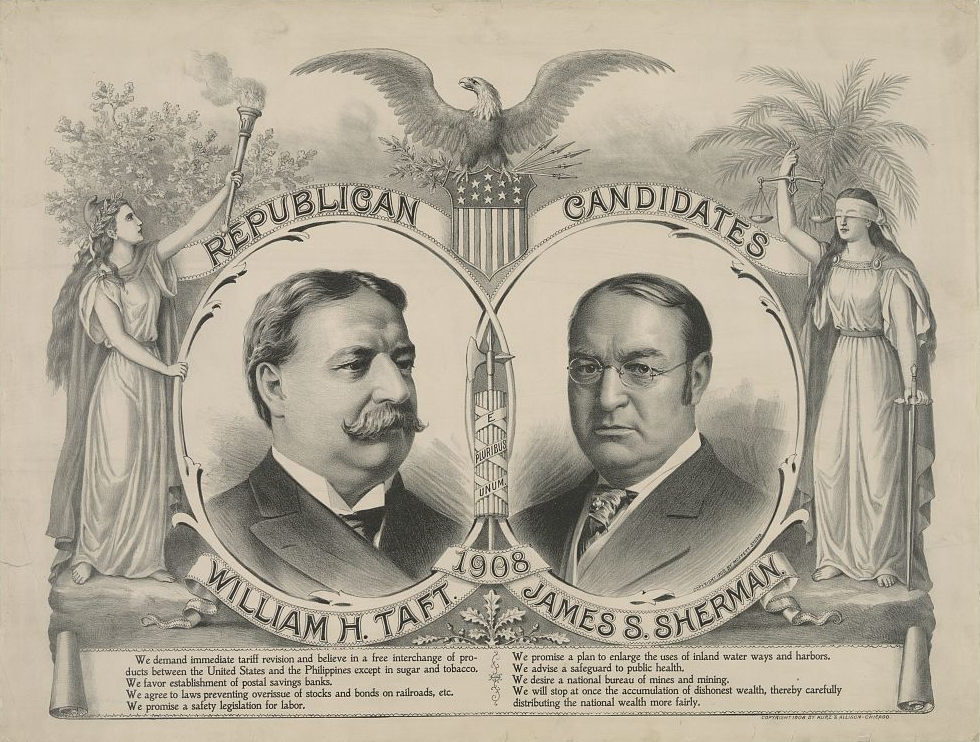
1908 Taft/Sherman poster

Taft began the campaign on the wrong foot, fueling the arguments of those who said he was not his own man by traveling to Roosevelt's home at Sagamore Hill for advice on his acceptance speech, saying that he needed "the president's judgment and criticism". He supported most of Roosevelt's policies. Taft argued that labor had a right to organize, but not boycott, and that corporations and the wealthy must also obey the law. He attributed blame for the recent recession, the Panic of 1907, to stock speculation and other abuses, and felt some reform of the currency (the U.S. was on the gold standard) was needed to allow flexibility in the government's response to poor economic times. He also spoke out in favor of revisions to tariff rates and favored strengthening the Sherman Antitrust Act. Taft's opponent in the general election was William Jennings Bryan, the Democratic nominee for the third time in four presidential elections. He campaigned on a progressive platform attacking "government by privilege", and portraying Republicans as beholden to powerful corporate interests and to the wealthy. Given that many of Roosevelt's reforms stemmed from his proposals, the Democrat argued that he himself was the true heir to Roosevelt's mantle.

1908 electoral vote results

During the fall campaign Roosevelt showered Taft with advice and infused energy into his campaign. Consequently, accusations abounded that the president was in effect running Taft's campaign. His larger-than-life presence in the campaign also caught the attention of journalists and humorists who bombarded the public with jokes about Taft being nothing but a Roosevelt stand-in; one suggested that "T.A.F.T." stood for "Take Advice From Theodore." In the end, Taft defeated Bryan by 321 electoral votes to 162, carrying all but three states outside the Democratic Solid South. He also won the popular vote by a comfortable margin, receiving 7,675,320 votes (51.6 percent) to Bryan's 6,412,294 (43.1 percent); Socialist Party candidate Eugene V. Debs won 420,793 votes (2.8 percent). Nellie Taft said regarding the campaign, "There was nothing to criticize, except his not knowing or caring about the way the game of politics is played." Roosevelt, meanwhile, left office with regret that his tenure in the position he enjoyed so much was over. To keep out of Taft's way, he arranged for a year-long hunting trip to Africa.

== Transition ==
Presidential transition of William Howard Taft
- Election date: November 3, 1908
- Inauguration date: March 4, 1909
- President-elect: William Howard Taft (Republican)
- Vice president-elect: James S. Sherman (Republican)
- Outgoing president: Theodore Roosevelt (Republican)
- Outgoing vice president: Charles W. Fairbanks (Republican)

On November 17, 1908, President-elect Taft spoke in agreement with the stance expressed by Secretary of War Luke Edward Wright supporting free trade of sugar and tobacco with the Philippines.

On December 19, 1908, Taft announced that he had chosen Philander C. Knox to serve as his secretary of state. He also stated that Knox would play a role in advising him in selecting the rest of his Cabinet.

On February 17, 1909, it was reported that Jacob M. Dickinson would serve as Taft's secretary of war and Willis Van Devanter would serve as his secretary of the treasury. However, by March 4, Franklin MacVeagh was instead chosen for secretary of the treasury.

During his presidential transition period, Taft visited Panama, from January 29 through February 7, 1909. In Panama, he inspected the construction of the Panama Canal, and met with President of Panama José Domingo de Obaldía. During his transition, Taft also conducted some domestic traveling, including a visit to Atlanta where he was fed opossum at a dinner hosted by the Atlanta Chamber of Commerce on January 15, 1909. Taft would develop a somewhat famous affinity for eating the animal after this dinner.

== Inauguration ==
Taft's presidential inauguration was held on March 4, 1909. Due to a winter storm that coated Washington with ice, Taft was sworn in within the Senate Chamber rather than outside the Capitol, as is customary. Taft stated in his inaugural address that he had been honored to have been "one of the advisers of my distinguished predecessor" and to have had a part "in the reforms he has initiated. I should be untrue to myself, to my promises, and to the declarations of the party platform on which I was elected if I did not make the maintenance and enforcement of those reforms a most important feature of my administration". He pledged to make those reforms long-lasting, ensuring that honest businessmen did not suffer uncertainty through change of policy. He spoke of the need for reduction of the 1897 Dingley Tariff, for antitrust reform, and for continued advancement of the Philippines toward full self-government.

== Administration ==
=== Cabinet ===
Taft cabinet
| Office | Name | Term |
| President | William Howard Taft | 1909–1913 |
| Vice President | James S. Sherman | 1909–1912 |
| none | 1912–1913 |
| Secretary of State | Philander C. Knox | 1909–1913 |
| Secretary of the Treasury | Franklin MacVeagh | 1909–1913 |
| Secretary of War | Jacob M. Dickinson | 1909–1911 |
| Henry L. Stimson | 1911–1913 |
| Attorney General | George W. Wickersham | 1909–1913 |
| Postmaster General | Frank Harris Hitchcock | 1909–1913 |
| Secretary of the Navy | George von Lengerke Meyer | 1909–1913 |
| Secretary of the Interior | Richard A. Ballinger | 1909–1911 |
| Walter L. Fisher | 1911–1913 |
| Secretary of Agriculture | James Wilson | 1909–1913 |
| Secretary of Commerce and Labor | Charles Nagel | 1909–1913 |

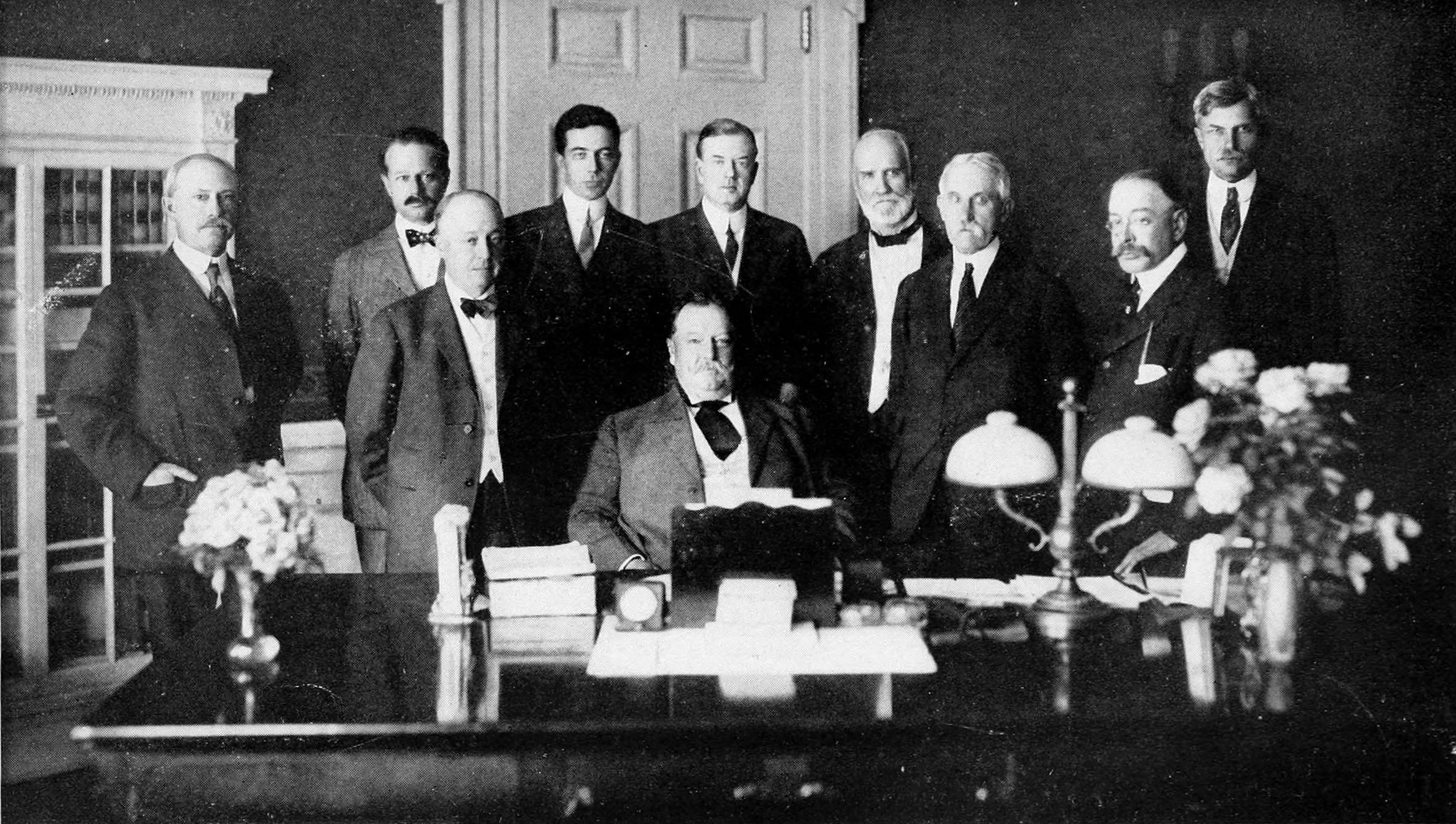
Taft, seated at center, and his cabinet (September 1910), left to right: Richard Achilles Ballinger, George von Lengerke Meyer, Philander C. Knox, Charles Dyer Norton, Frank Harris Hitchcock, James Wilson, Franklin MacVeagh, George W. Wickersham, Charles Nagel

During the 1908 campaign, Taft and Roosevelt had discussed which Cabinet officers would stay on, but Taft kept only Agriculture Secretary James Wilson and George von Lengerke Meyer. Meyer was shifted from the position of Postmaster General to the position of Secretary of the Navy. Taft also asked Secretary of State Elihu Root to remain in his position, but Root declined and instead recommended former Attorney General Philander C. Knox for the position. Others appointed to the Taft's inaugural Cabinet include Secretary of the Interior Richard A. Ballinger, Secretary of the Treasury Franklin MacVeagh, Secretary of War Jacob M. Dickinson, Postmaster General Frank Harris Hitchcock, Secretary of Commerce and Labor Charles Nagel, and Attorney General George W. Wickersham. In 1911, Henry L. Stimson replaced Dickinson, and Walter L. Fisher replaced Ballinger.

=== Vice Presidency ===
James S. Sherman had been added to the 1908 Republican ticket as a means to appease the conservative wing of the GOP, which viewed Taft as a progressive. As Taft moved to the right during his presidency, Sherman emerged an important ally to the president. Nominated for a second term at the 1912 Republican National Convention, he became ill during the campaign and died on October 30, 1912, just prior to the election. As the Constitution lacked a mechanism for choosing an intra-term replacement prior to ratification of the Twenty-fifth Amendment in 1967, the vice presidency remained vacant for the final 125 days of Taft's presidency. During that time, Secretary of State Philander C. Knox was next in line to the presidency, per the Presidential Succession Act of 1886.

=== Press corps ===
Taft did not enjoy the easy relationship with the press that Roosevelt had, choosing not to offer himself for interviews or photo opportunities as often as his predecessor had. His administration marked a change in style from the charismatic leadership of Roosevelt to Taft's quieter passion for the rule of law.

== Judicial appointments ==
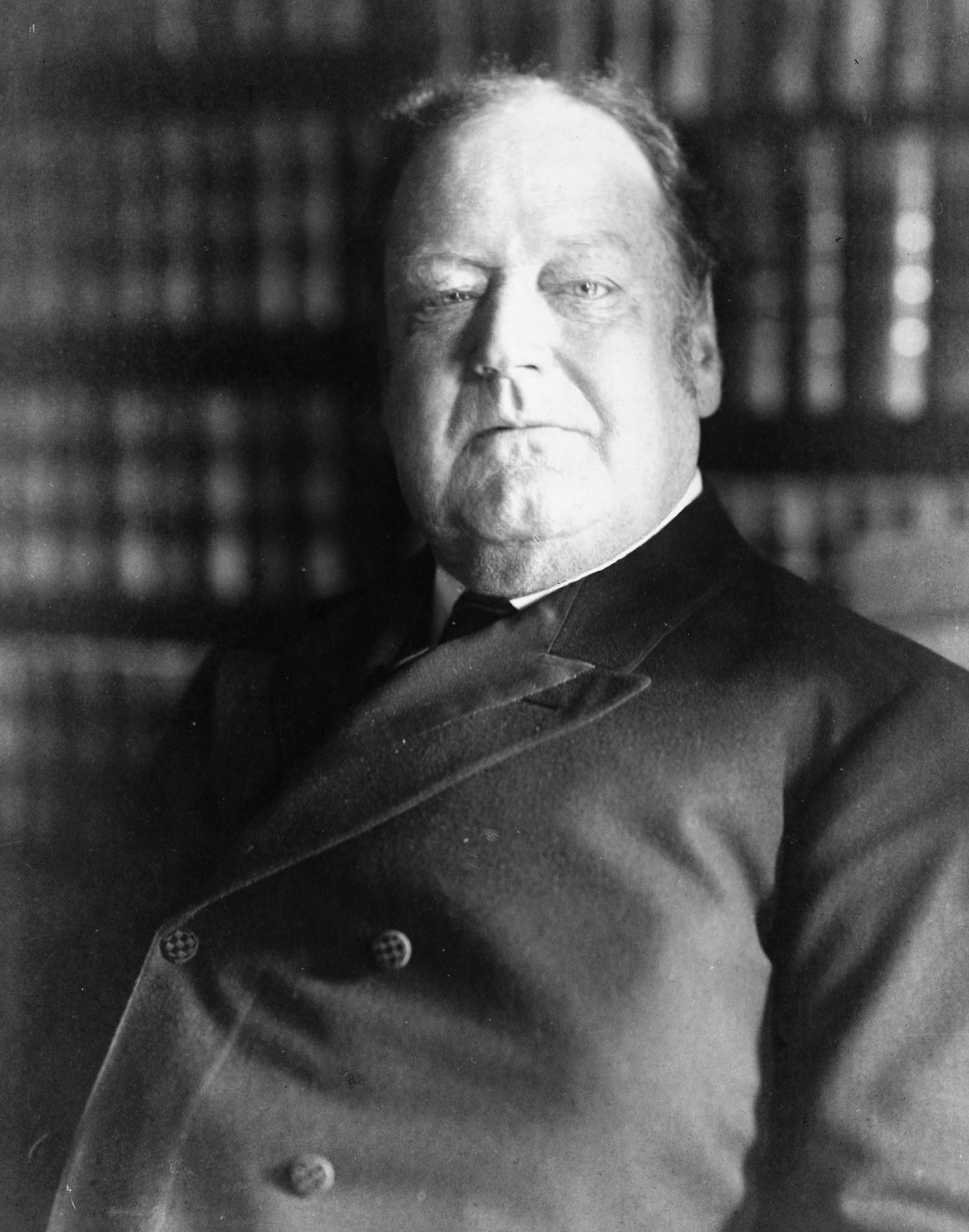
Taft appointed Edward Douglass White to be Chief Justice of the United States. Taft himself succeeded White as Chief Justice in 1921.

Throughout his career Taft identified with the judiciary, and he made six appointments to the Supreme Court, the most of any president except George Washington and Franklin D. Roosevelt. He appointed Horace H. Lurton in 1909, Charles Evans Hughes, Willis Van Devanter, and Joseph R. Lamar in 1910, and Mahlon Pitney in 1912. Additionally, Taft elevated Associate Justice Edward Douglass White to the position of chief justice in 1910. The Supreme Court under Chief Justice White proved to be less conservative than both the preceding Fuller Court and the succeeding Taft Court, although the court continued to strike down numerous economic regulations as part of the Lochner era. Three of Taft's appointees left the court by 1917, while Pitney and White remained on the court until the early 1920s. The conservative Van Devanter was the lone Taft appointee to serve past 1922, and he formed part of the Four Horsemen bloc that opposed Franklin D. Roosevelt's New Deal. Taft himself would succeed White as Chief Justice in 1921, and he served with Pitney and Van Devanter on the Taft Court.

Taft also appointed 13 judges to the federal courts of appeal and 38 judges to the United States district courts. Taft also appointed judges to various specialized courts, including the first five appointees each to the United States Commerce Court and the United States Court of Customs Appeals.

== Domestic affairs ==
=== Tariffs and taxation ===
==== Payne-Aldrich Tariff ====
Immediately following his inauguration, Taft called a special session of Congress to convene in March 1909 for the purpose of revising the tariff schedules. Rates had been set by the 1897 Dingley Act, and were the highest in history. The Republican Party had made the high tariff the central plank of their economic policy since the end of the Civil War, but Taft and some other Republicans had come to believe that the Dingley Act had set the rates too high. Though the high tariff protected domestic manufacturing, it also hurt U.S. exports and raised the cost of living for the average American. Many saw the tariff as a de facto regressive tax on consumers, but favored policies that would shift the tax burden to corporations and high earners. While Roosevelt had largely avoided the tariff issue, Taft became the first Republican president to actively seek to lower tariff rates.

Representative Sereno E. Payne, chairman of the House Ways and Means Committee and an ally of conservative Speaker of the House Joseph Gurney Cannon, took charge of drafting tariff legislation. On balance, the bill Payne introduced reduced tariffs slightly, but not nearly as much as Taft and progressive Republicans preferred. Payne's bill passed the House in April 1909; when it reached the Senate, the chairman of the Senate Finance Committee, Nelson W. Aldrich, attached numerous amendments that raised tariff rates. Aldrich's amendments outraged progressives such as Wisconsin's Robert M. La Follette, who strongly opposed the high rates of the Payne-Aldrich tariff bill. Facing pressure from progressive senators to add an income tax to the bill, Taft and Aldrich instead arranged for Senator Henry Cabot Lodge to add another amendment to the bill containing a two percent tax on corporate incomes over $5,000. Following the insertion of that amendment, the bill passed the Senate and went to a conference committee, where minor reductions were made to tariff rates and the corporate income tax rate was lowered from two percent to one percent. Despite his disappointment with the high tariff rates contained in the final bill, Taft signed the Payne-Aldrich tariff into law.

Estimates vary on the overall average tariff rate reductions contained in the final bill; some estimates found that it would bring ad valorem tariff rates down from an average of approximately 40.2 percent to approximately 37 percent, but others asserted that it actually raised average rates. The corporate tax was the first such tax ever implemented by the federal government in peacetime, and it would produce about four percent of the federal government's revenue between 1909 and 1913. Opponents of the tax tried to have the Supreme Court declare it unconstitutional, but the tax was upheld in the 1911 case of Flint v. Stone Tracy Co. Despite the inclusion of that tax, the Payne-Aldrich tariff greatly disappointed progressive Republicans, and the resulting disharmony in the Republican Party received widespread exposure in the press, providing the Democrats with a powerful campaign issue for the 1910 congressional elections. The intra-party divisions that opened during the tariff debate would plague the Republican Party for the remainder of Taft's presidency.

==== Sixteenth Amendment ====
During the debate over the Payne-Aldrich tariff in mid-1909, Congress passed a resolution for a constitutional amendment that would allow the federal government to levy an income tax without having to apportion that tax among the states. The amendment would overturn the Supreme Court's ruling in the 1895 case of Pollock v. Farmers' Loan & Trust Co., and allow Congress to implement an income tax. An income tax would replace the revenue lost by a lower tariff. Passage of the amendment helped appease progressive opponents of the Payne-Aldrich tariff and helped ensure that the act passed Congress. Conservative leaders in Congress largely opposed the actual ratification of the amendment, but they believed that it had little chance of being ratified, as ratification required approval by three quarters of the state legislatures. Taft himself favored proposing the amendment to the state legislatures largely because he believed that without it a new income tax would undermine the legitimacy of the Supreme Court.

After Congress passed the amendment, conservative Republican leaders, as well as businessmen like John D. Rockefeller, organized efforts to prevent its ratification. These conservative forces were initially confident that over a quarter of the state legislature would reject the income tax amendment, but the country shifted in a progressive direction after 1909. Numerous conservative state legislators lost power during the 1910 and 1912 election cycles, and the imposition of taxes in Wisconsin and other states served as evidence of the viability of a federal income tax. On February 3, 1913, Wyoming became the 36th state to approve the amendment, and later that month Secretary of State Knox declared that the United States had ratified the Sixteenth Amendment. After Taft left office, a new federal income tax was imposed through the Revenue Act of 1913.

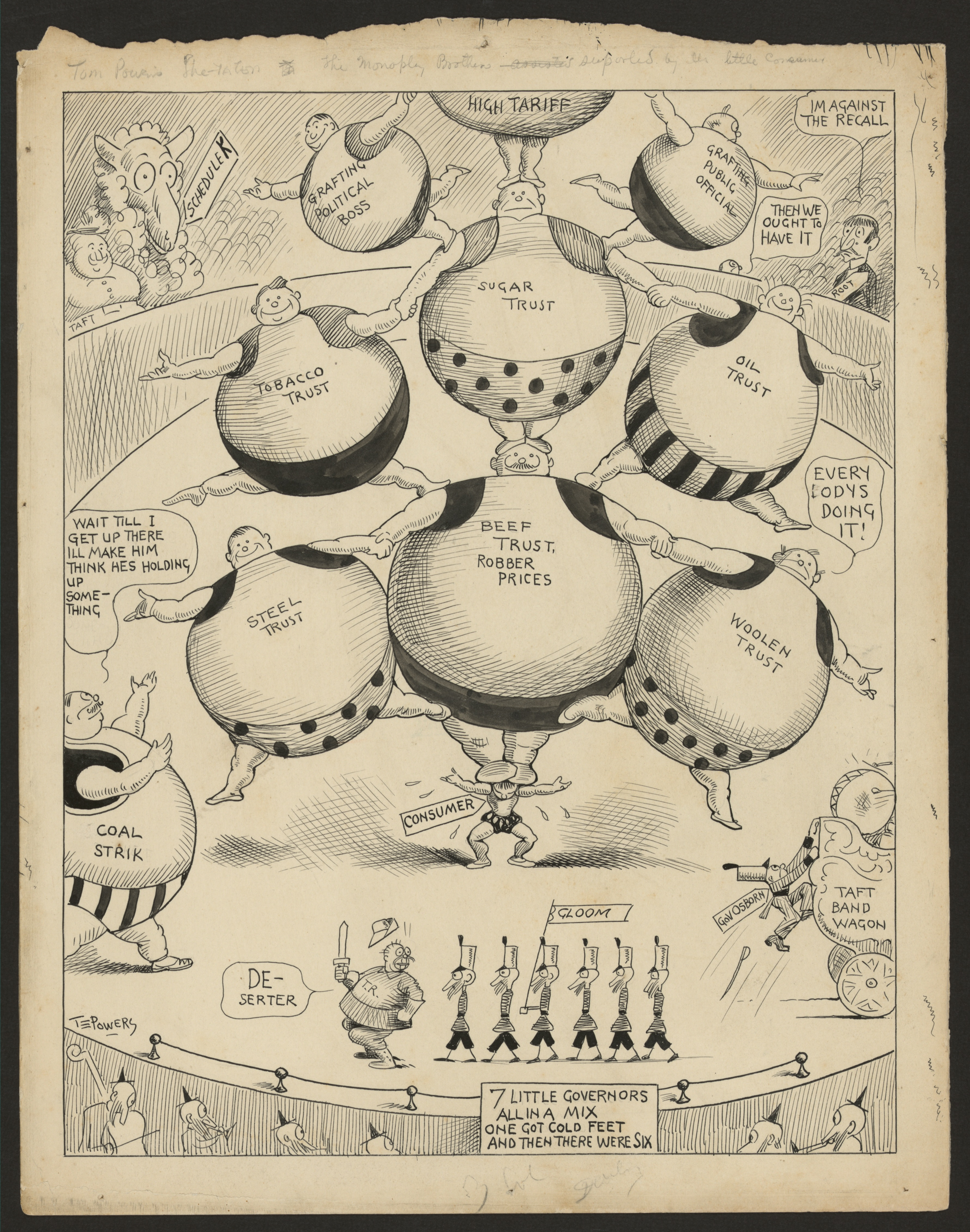
Monopoly brothers—high profits all carried by hapless little consumer 1912; by Thomas Powers

=== Antitrust ===
Taft expanded Roosevelt's efforts to break up business combinations through lawsuits brought under the Sherman Antitrust Act, bringing 70 cases in four years (Roosevelt had brought 40 in seven years). Suits brought against the Standard Oil Company and the American Tobacco Company, initiated under Roosevelt, were decided in favor of the government by the Supreme Court in 1911. In June 1911, the Democrat-controlled House of Representatives began hearings into U.S. Steel. Roosevelt had supported U.S. Steel's acquisition of the Tennessee Coal, Iron, and Railroad Company as a means of preventing the deepening of the Panic of 1907, a decision the former president defended when testifying at the hearings. Taft, as Secretary of War, had praised the acquisitions.

In October 1911, Taft's Justice Department brought suit against U.S. Steel, demanding that over a hundred of its subsidiaries be granted corporate independence, and naming as defendants many prominent business executives and financiers. The pleadings in the case had not been reviewed by Taft, and alleged that Roosevelt "had fostered monopoly, and had been duped by clever industrialists". Roosevelt was offended by the references to him and his administration in the pleadings, and felt that Taft could not evade command responsibility by saying he did not know of them. Historian Louis L. Gould suggests that Roosevelt was likely deceived into believing that U.S. Steel did not want to purchase the Tennessee company, but it was in fact a bargain.

Taft sent a special message to Congress on the need for a revamped antitrust statute when it convened its regular session in December 1911, but it took no action. Another antitrust case that had political repercussions for Taft was that brought against the International Harvester Company, the large manufacturer of farm equipment, in early 1912. As Roosevelt's administration had investigated International Harvester, but had taken no action (a decision Taft had supported), the suit became caught up in Roosevelt's challenge for the Republican presidential nomination. Supporters of Taft alleged that Roosevelt had acted improperly; the former president blasted Taft for waiting three and a half years, and until he was under challenge, to reverse a decision he had supported.

=== Ballinger–Pinchot affair ===
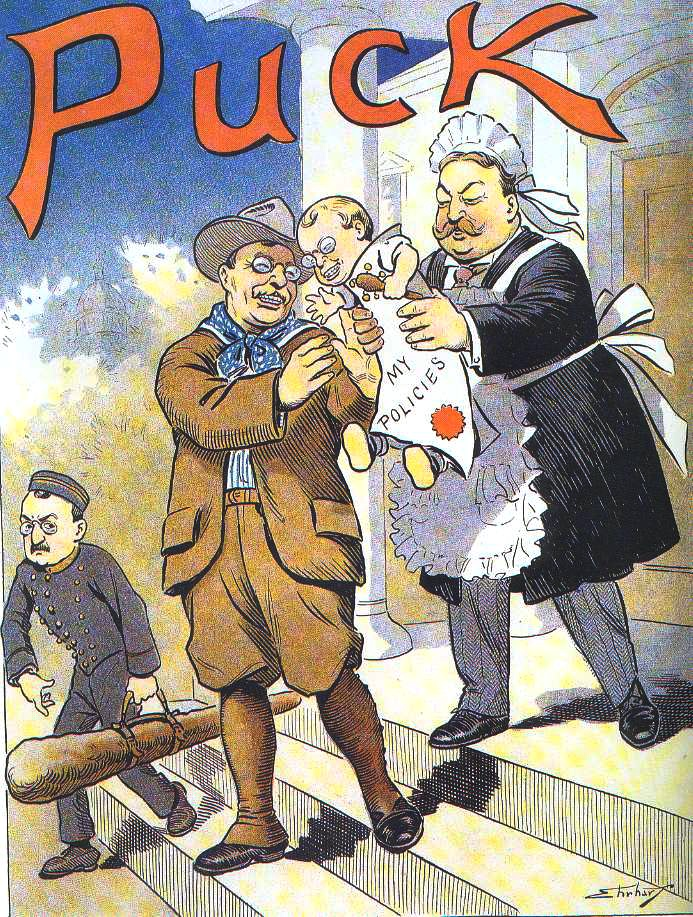
1909 Puck magazine cover: Roosevelt departs, entrusting his policies to Taft.

Roosevelt was an ardent conservationist, assisted in this by like-minded appointees, including Interior Secretary James R. Garfield and Chief Forester Gifford Pinchot. Taft agreed with the need for conservation, but felt it should be accomplished by legislation rather than executive order. He did not retain Garfield, an Ohioan, as secretary, choosing instead a westerner, former Seattle mayor Richard Ballinger. Roosevelt was surprised at the replacement, believing that Taft had promised to keep Garfield. Roosevelt had withdrawn much land from the public domain, including some in Alaska thought rich in coal. In 1902, Idaho entrepreneur Clarence Cunningham had made mining claims to coal deposits in Alaska, and a government investigation into the matter lasted throughout Roosevelt's presidency. During part of that investigation, Ballinger served as head of the United States General Land Office. When Ballinger, now Secretary of the Interior, finally approved the claims in 1909, Land Office agent Louis Glavis broke governmental protocol by going outside the Interior Department to seek help from Pinchot.

In September 1909, Glavis made his allegations public in a magazine article, disclosing that Ballinger had acted as an attorney for Cunningham between his two periods of government service. This violated conflict of interest rules forbidding a former government official from advocacy on a matter he had been responsible for. On September 13, 1909, Taft dismissed Glavis from government service, relying on a report from Attorney General Wickersham dated two days previously. He also ordered government officials not to comment on the fracas. Pinchot was determined to dramatize the issue by forcing his own dismissal, which Taft tried to avoid, fearing that it might cause a break with Roosevelt. Taft asked Senator Elihu Root to look into the matter, and Root urged the firing of Pinchot.

In January 1910, Pinchot forced the issue by sending a letter to Senator Jonathan Dolliver alleging that but for the actions of the Forestry Service, Taft would have approved a fraudulent claim on public lands. According to Pringle, this "was an utterly improper appeal from an executive subordinate to the legislative branch of the government and an unhappy president prepared to separate Pinchot from public office". Pinchot was dismissed, much to his delight, and he sailed for Europe to lay his case before Roosevelt. A congressional investigation followed, which cleared Ballinger by majority vote, but the administration was embarrassed when Glavis' attorney, Louis D. Brandeis, proved that the Wickersham report had been backdated, which Taft belatedly admitted. The Ballinger–Pinchot affair caused progressives and Roosevelt loyalists to feel that Taft had turned his back on Roosevelt's agenda.

=== Civil rights ===
Taft announced in his inaugural address that he would not appoint African Americans to federal jobs, such as postmaster, where this would cause racial friction. This differed from Roosevelt, who would not remove or replace black officeholders with whom local whites would not deal. Termed Taft's "Southern Policy", this stance effectively invited white protests against black appointees. Taft followed through, removing most black office holders in the South, and made few appointments from that race in the North.

At the time Taft was inaugurated, the way forward for African Americans was debated by their leaders. Booker T. Washington felt that most blacks should be trained for industrial work, with only a few seeking higher education; W.E.B. DuBois took a more militant stand for equality. Taft tended towards Washington's approach. According to Coletta, Taft let the African-American "be 'kept in his place' ... He thus failed to see or follow the humanitarian mission historically associated with the Republican party, with the result that Negroes both North and South began to drift toward the Democratic party."

=== Other initiatives ===
Taft sought greater regulation of railroads, and he proposed the creation of the United States Commerce Court to hear appeals from the Interstate Commerce Commission (ICC), which provided federal oversight to railroads and other common carriers engaged in interstate commerce. The Mann–Elkins Act established the Commerce Court and increased the authority of the ICC, placing telegraph and telephone companies under its authority and allowing it to set price ceilings on rail fares. The Commerce Court proved to be unpopular with members of Congress, and it was abolished in 1913.

Taft proposed that the Post Office Department act as a bank that would accept small deposits. Though the idea was opposed by conservative Republicans such as Senator Aldrich and Speaker of the House Joseph Cannon, Taft won passage of a law establishing the United States Postal Savings System. Taft also oversaw the establishment of a domestic parcel post delivery system.

The results from the 1910 midterm elections were disappointing to the president, as Democrats took control of the House and many of Taft's preferred candidates were defeated. The election was a major victory for progressives in both parties, and ultimately helped encourage Roosevelt's 1912 third party run. Taft was also disappointed by the defeat of Warren G. Harding in the 1910 Ohio gubernatorial race, while in New Jersey, Democrat Woodrow Wilson was elected governor. With a divided government, the second half of Taft's term saw the passage of much less legislation than the first.

Taft vetoed a total of 39 bills in his administration—nine of these were pocket vetoes. Only one veto was overridden by Congress; this concerned a bill passed in his final week in office removing Congress from regulation of certain alcoholic beverages and delegating this function to the states, which the president argued was a function of Congress under the interstate commerce clause.

=== Direct election of senators ===
For the first 125 years of the federal government's existence, Americans did not directly vote for U.S. Senators. The Constitution, as it was adopted in 1788, stated that senators would be elected by state legislatures. During the 1890s, the House of Representatives passed several resolutions proposing a constitutional amendment for the direct election of senators, but the Senate refused to even take a vote on such a measure. A number of states began calling for a constitutional convention on the subject, since Article V of the Constitution states that Congress must call a constitutional convention for proposing amendments when two-thirds of the state legislatures apply for one. By 1912, 27 states had called for a constitutional convention on the subject, with 31 states needed to reach the threshold. As the number of applications neared the two-thirds threshold, the Senate abandoned its strategy of obstruction. An amendment to the Constitution establishing the popular election of United States senators by the people of the states was approved by Congress on May 13, 1912, and submitted to the state legislatures for ratification. By April 8, 1913, it had been ratified by the requisite number of states (36) to become the Seventeenth Amendment to the United States Constitution.

=== Puerto Rico ===
In 1909, Puerto Rico protested against its political status, in particular its loss of home rule and its lack of representation in Washington D.C. Following the 1908 Puerto Rican general election, which resulted in a larger faction of pro-independence representatives in the Puerto Rico House of Representatives, the House refused to enact any legislation unless the United States recognize Puerto Rico's right to self-government. In an address to the U.S. Congress, Taft scolded the Puerto Rican legislators. Taft pushed for legislation that would give Puerto Rico the same budget as the previous year in cases where the Puerto legislature failed to adopt a new budget; the U.S. Congress passed the legislation, as well as placed Puerto Rico under the War Department’s Bureau of Insular Affairs. Puerto Ricans continued to push for greater autonomy and greater representation in Washington D.C., but it was not until the 1917 Jones-Shafroth Act that this was achieved.

=== States admitted to the Union ===
Since Oklahoma's admission in 1907, there had been 46 states in the union, with New Mexico Territory and Arizona Territory the only remaining territories in the Contiguous United States. The Enabling Act of 1906 would have allowed Arizona and New Mexico to join the union as one state, but Arizona had voted against the combination in a referendum. In 1910, New Mexico and Arizona both wrote a constitution in anticipation of statehood, and Arizona's constitution included progressive ideas such as initiative, referendum, and recall. Taft opposed these mechanisms, particularly the ability to recall judges, and he vetoed Arizona's statehood bill. Without any such constitutional issues, New Mexico joined the union as the 47th state on January 6, 1912. After Arizona wrote a new constitution removing the power to recall judges, Taft signed a bill admitting Arizona on February 14, 1912. Arizona then reinstated the recall clause.

== Foreign affairs ==
Taft was well-educated in foreign affairs, from his academic studies of international arbitration, to his administration of the Philippines, and especially his service as Secretary of War. His main innovation was to downplay the use of physical power and threats of power, and emphasize the nation's rapidly growing economic power. He called it "Dollar Diplomacy." It played a role in China and Latin America. He negotiated a reciprocity treaty for freer trade with Canada, but it became enmeshed in Canadian politics and was rejected. He became thoroughly entangled in domestic politics on the tariff issue, and the result divided his party.

=== Organization and principles ===
Taft made it a priority to restructure the State Department, noting, "it is organized on the basis of the needs of the government in 1800 instead of 1900." The department was for the first time organized into geographical divisions, including desks for the Far East, Latin America and Western Europe. The department's first in-service training program was established, and appointees spent a month in Washington before going to their posts. Taft and Secretary of State Knox had a strong relationship, and the president listened to his counsel on matters foreign and domestic. According to Coletta, however, Knox was not a good diplomat, and had poor relations with the Senate, press, and many foreign leaders, especially those from Latin America.

There was broad agreement between Taft and Knox on major foreign policy goals. The U.S. would not interfere in European affairs, and would use force if necessary to uphold the Monroe Doctrine in the Americas. The defense of the Panama Canal, which was under construction throughout Taft's term (it opened in 1914), guided policy in the Caribbean and Central America. Previous administrations had made efforts to promote American business interests overseas, but Taft went a step further and used the web of American diplomats and consuls abroad to further trade. Such ties, Taft hoped, would promote world peace. Unlike his predecessor, Taft did not seek to arbitrate conflicts among the other great powers. Taft avoided involvement in international events such as the Agadir Crisis, the Italo-Turkish War, and the First Balkan War. However, Taft did express support for the creation of an international arbitration tribunal and called for an international arms reduction agreement.

=== Proposed free trade accord with Canada ===
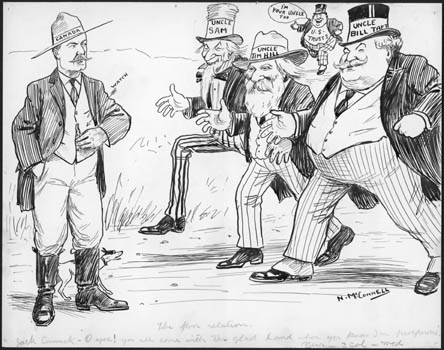
Newton McConnell cartoon showing Canadian suspicions that Taft and others were only interested in Canada when prosperous

Partly due to the backlash over the high rates of the Payne-Aldrich Tariff, Taft urged the adoption of a free trade accord with Canada. Britain at that time still handled Canada's foreign relations, and Taft found the British and Canadian governments willing to engage in negotiations. Many in Canada opposed an accord, fearing the U.S. would discard it when convenient, as it had the Elgin-Marcy Treaty in 1866. American farm and fisheries interests were also opposed to the treaty. Nonetheless, Taft reached an agreement with Canadian officials in early 1911, and Congress approved it in late July. The Canadian Parliament, led by Prime Minister Sir Wilfrid Laurier, deadlocked over the issue, and the Canadians turned Laurier out of office in the September 1911 election. No cross-border agreement was concluded, and the debate deepened divisions in the Republican Party.

=== Central America ===
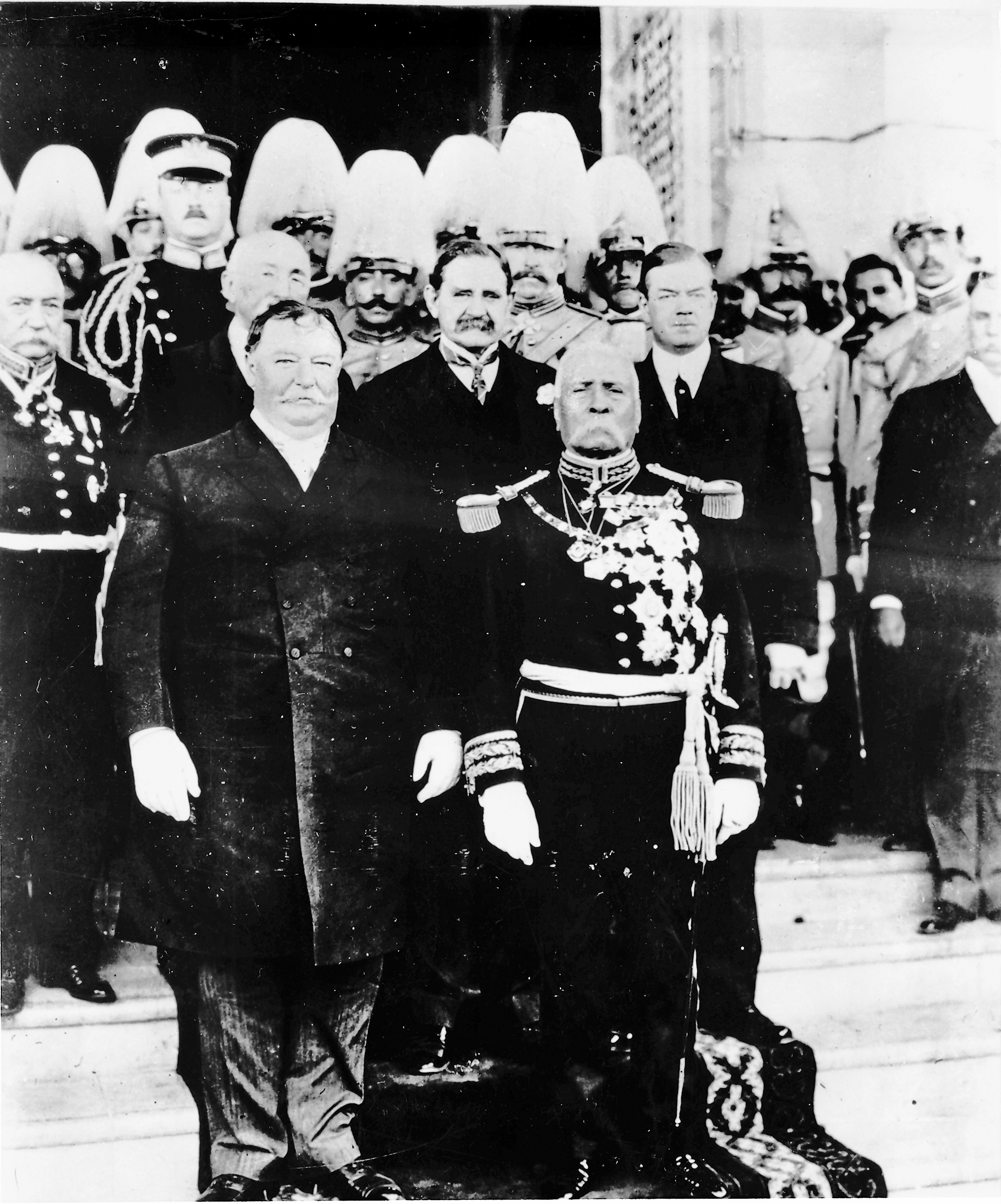
Taft and Porfirio Díaz, Ciudad Juárez, Mexico, 1909

Taft and Secretary of State Knox instituted a policy of Dollar Diplomacy towards Latin America, believing U.S. investment would benefit all involved and minimize European influence in the area. Although exports rose sharply during Taft's administration, his Dollar Diplomacy policy was unpopular among Latin American states that did not wish to become financial protectorates of the United States. Dollar Diplomacy also faced opposition in the U.S. Senate, as many senators believed the U.S. should not interfere abroad.

In Nicaragua, American diplomats quietly favored rebel forces under Juan J. Estrada against the government of President José Santos Zelaya, who wanted to revoke commercial concessions granted to American companies. Secretary Knox was reportedly a major stockholder in one of the companies that would be hurt by such a move. The country was in debt to several foreign powers, and the U.S. was unwilling to have it (along with its alternate canal route) fall into the hands of Europeans. Zelaya and his elected successor, José Madriz, were unable to put down the rebellion, and in August 1910, Estrada's forces took the capital of Managua. The U.S. had Nicaragua accept a loan, and sent officials to ensure it was repaid from government revenues. The country remained unstable, and after another coup in 1911 and more disturbances in 1912, Taft sent troops; though most were soon withdrawn, some remained as late as 1933.

Treaties among Panama, Colombia, and the United States to resolve disputes arising from the Panamanian Revolution of 1903 had been signed by the lame-duck Roosevelt administration in early 1909, and were approved by the Senate and also ratified by Panama. Colombia, however, declined to ratify the treaties, and after the 1912 elections, Knox offered $10 million to the Colombians (later raised to $25 million). The Colombians felt the amount inadequate, and the matter was not settled under the Taft administration.

=== Mexico ===
The collapse of the Mexican regime and subsequent turmoil of the Mexican Revolution provided Taft with a significant challenge to his statesmanship. When Taft entered office, Mexico was increasingly restless under the long-time dictatorship of Porfirio Díaz. Díaz faced strong political opposition from Francisco I. Madero, who was backed by a sizeable proportion of the population, and was also confronted with serious social unrest sparked by Emiliano Zapata in the south and by Pancho Villa in the north. In October 1909, Taft and Díaz exchanged visits across the Mexico–United States border, at El Paso, Texas, and Ciudad Juárez, Chihuahua. Their meetings were the first ever between a U.S. and a Mexican president, and also represented the first time an American president visited Mexico. Diaz hoped to use the meeting as a propaganda tool to show that his government had the U.S.'s unconditional support. For his part, Taft was mainly interested in protecting American corporate investments in Mexico. The symbolically important meetings helped pave the way for the start of construction on the Elephant Butte Dam project in 1911.

The situation in Mexico deteriorated throughout 1910, and there were a number of incidents in which Mexican rebels crossed the U.S. border to obtain horses and weapons. After Díaz jailed opposition candidate Madero prior to the 1910 presidential election, Madero's supporters responded by taking up arms against the government. This unrest resulted in both the ousting of Díaz and a revolution that would continue for another ten years. In the Arizona Territory, two citizens were killed and almost a dozen injured, some as a result of gunfire across the border. Taft would not be goaded into fighting and so instructed the territorial governor not to respond to provocations. In March 1911, he sent 20,000 American troops up to the Mexican border to protect American citizens and financial investments in Mexico. He told his military aide, Archibald Butt, that "I am going to sit on the lid and it will take a great deal to pry me off".

=== Far East ===
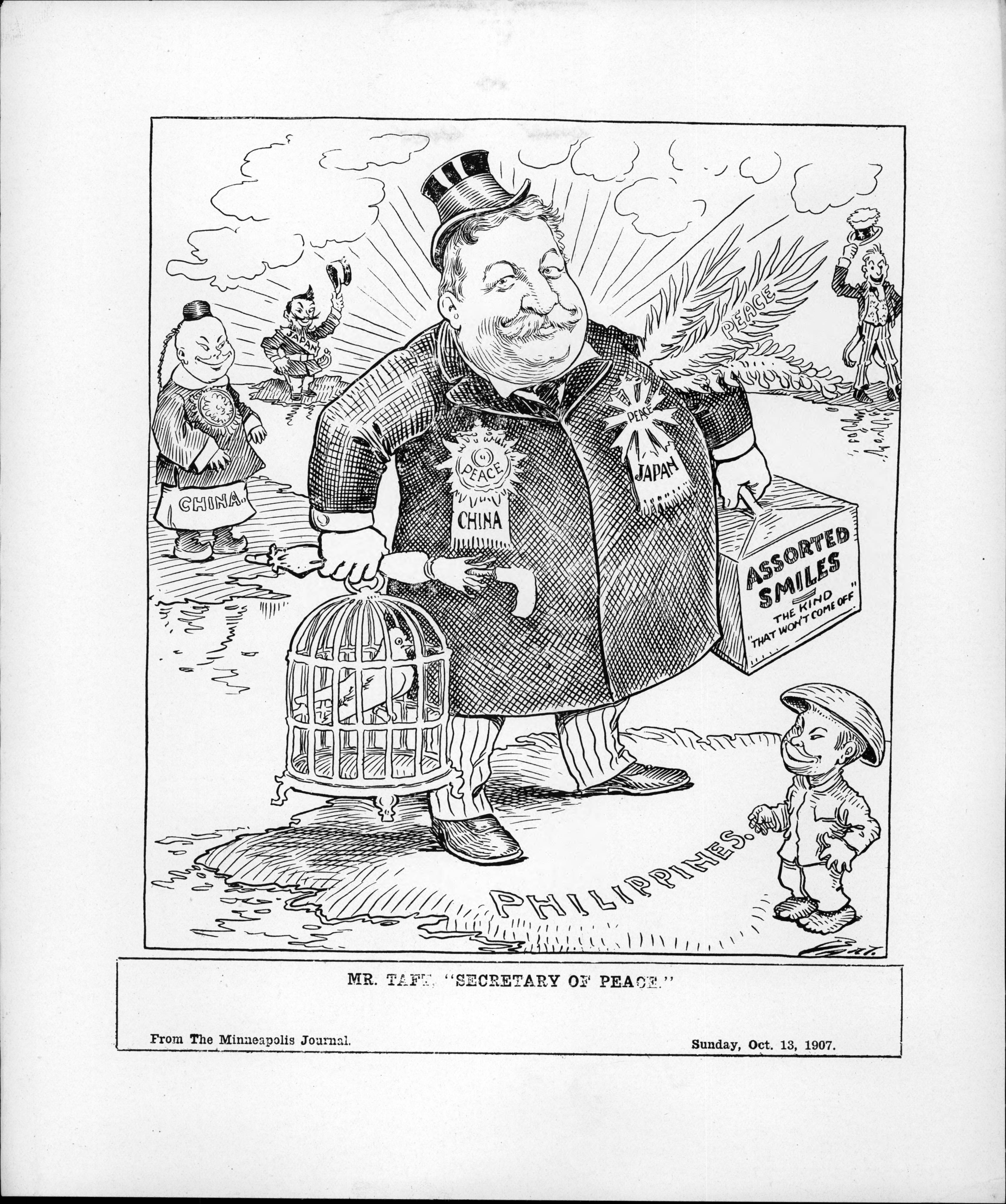
Taft, as Secretary of War, went on a diplomatic tour to China, Japan and the Philippines in 1907 to discuss the future and keep the peace.

Having served as the governor of the Philippines, Taft was keenly interested in Asian-Pacific affairs. Because of the potential for trade and investment, Taft ranked the post of minister to China as most important in the Foreign Service. Knox did not agree, and declined a suggestion that he go to Peking to view the facts on the ground. Taft replaced Roosevelt's minister there, William W. Rockhill, as uninterested in the China trade, with William J. Calhoun, whom McKinley and Roosevelt had sent on several foreign missions. Knox did not listen to Calhoun on policy, and there were often conflicts. Taft and Knox tried unsuccessfully to extend John Hay's Open Door Policy to Manchuria. In 1909, a British-led consortium began negotiations to finance a railroad from Hankou and Sichuan. Taft appealed personally to the Prince Regent, Zaifeng, Prince Chun, and was successful in gaining U.S. participation in the financing of the railroads. However, the Chinese decree authorizing the agreement also required the nationalization of local railroad companies in the affected provinces. Inadequate compensation was paid to the shareholders, and these grievances were among those which touched off the 1911 Revolution.

After the 1911 Revolution broke out, the revolt's leaders chose Sun Yat Sen as provisional president of what became the Republic of China, overthrowing the Manchu Dynasty. Taft was reluctant to recognize the new government, although American public opinion was in favor of it. The U.S. House of Representatives in February 1912 passed a resolution supporting a Chinese republic, but Taft and Knox felt recognition should come as a concerted action by Western powers. In his final annual message to Congress in December 1912, Taft indicated that he was moving towards recognition once the republic was fully established, but by then he had been defeated for re-election and he did not follow through.

Taft continued the policy against immigration from China and Japan as under Roosevelt. A revised treaty of friendship and navigation entered into by the U.S. and Japan in 1911 granted broad reciprocal rights to Japanese in America and Americans in Japan, but were premised on the continuation of the Gentlemen's Agreement of 1907. There was objection on the West Coast when the treaty was submitted to the Senate, but Taft informed politicians that there was no change in immigration policy.

=== Arbitration ===
Taft favored settling international disputes via arbitration, and in 1911 Taft and Secretary of State Knox negotiated major treaties with Great Britain and France providing that differences be arbitrated. Neither Taft nor Knox consulted with members of the Senate during the negotiating process. By then many Republicans were opposed to Taft, and the president felt that lobbying too hard for the treaties might cause their defeat. He made some speeches supporting the treaties in October 1911, but the Senate added amendments Taft could not accept, killing the agreements. Roosevelt worked with his close friend, Senator Henry Cabot Lodge, to impose the Senate amendments. Lodge thought that the treaties impinged on senatorial prerogatives, while Roosevelt sought to sabotage Taft's campaign promises and believed that arbitration was a naïve solution and that great issues had to be decided by warfare. Although no general arbitration treaty was entered into, Taft's administration settled several disputes with Great Britain by peaceful means, often involving arbitration. These included a settlement of the boundary between Maine and New Brunswick, a long-running dispute over seal hunting in the Bering Sea that also involved Japan, and a similar disagreement regarding fishing off Newfoundland.

=== Evaluation ===
According to Lewis L. Gould in 2009:

Taft's dollar diplomacy approach remains fascinating to students of international affairs....The paternalism and cultural condescension that animated Taft and Philander Knox in Latin America continue to draw scorn from recent writers in this area....He insisted that the United States would not intervene in revolutionary Mexico without the approval of Congress, which he knew would not be forthcoming.

== Moving apart from Roosevelt ==
Stanley Solvick argues that President Taft abided by the goals and procedures of the "Square Deal" promoted by Roosevelt in his first term. The problem was that Roosevelt and the more radical progressives had moved on to more aggressive goals, such as curbing the judiciary, which Taft rejected.

The arbitration issue opens a window on a bitter dispute among progressives. Taft and many progressives looked to legal arbitration as an alternative to warfare. Roosevelt—a warrior not a lawyer—rejected that line of thought as the product of a too-soft business culture. Taft was a constitutional lawyer who later became Chief Justice; he had a deep understanding of the legal issues. Taft's political base was the conservative business community which largely supported arbitration and often talked peace. His mistake in this case was a failure to fully mobilize that base. The businessmen believed that economic rivalries were cause of war, and that extensive trade led to an interdependent world that would make war a very expensive and useless anachronism. One early success came in the Newfoundland fisheries dispute between the United States and Britain in 1910. Taft's 1911 treaties with France and Britain were killed by Roosevelt, who had broken with his protégé in 1910. War and peace became issues in their duel for control of the Republican Party. At a deeper level, Roosevelt truly believed that arbitration was a naïve solution and that great issues had to be decided by warfare. The Rooseveltian approach had a near-mystical faith in the ennobling nature of war. It endorsed jingoistic nationalism as opposed to the businessmen's calculation of profit and national interest.

During Roosevelt's fifteen months in Europe and Africa, from March 1909 to June 1910, neither man wrote much to the other. Taft biographer Lurie suggested that each expected the other to make the first move to re-establish their relationship on a new footing. Upon Roosevelt's triumphant return, Taft invited him to stay at the White House. The former president declined, and in private letters to friends expressed dissatisfaction at Taft's performance. Nevertheless, he wrote that he expected Taft to be renominated by the Republicans in 1912, and did not speak of himself as a candidate. Taft and Roosevelt met twice in 1910; the meetings, though superficially cordial, did not display their former closeness.

Roosevelt gave a series of speeches in the West in the late summer and early fall of 1910. Roosevelt not only attacked the Supreme Court's 1905 decision in Lochner v. New York, he accused the federal courts of undermining democracy, and called for them to be deprived of the power to rule legislation unconstitutional. This attack horrified Taft, who privately agreed that Lochner had been wrongly decided but strongly supported judicial review. Roosevelt called for the "elimination of corporate expenditures for political purposes, physical valuation of railroad properties, regulation of industrial combinations, establishment of an export tariff commission, a graduated income tax ... workmen's compensation laws, state and national legislation to regulate the [labor] of women and children, and complete publicity of campaign expenditure". John Murphy writes that, "as Roosevelt began to move to the left, Taft veered to the right." Taft had become increasingly associated with the conservative "Old Guard" faction of the party, and progressive Republicans such as Wisconsin Senator Robert La Follette became dissatisfied with Taft's leadership. La Follette and his followers formed the National Republican Progressive League as a platform to challenge Taft in 1912 presidential election, either for the Republican nomination or in the general election as a third party.

== Election of 1912 ==
=== Republican nomination ===
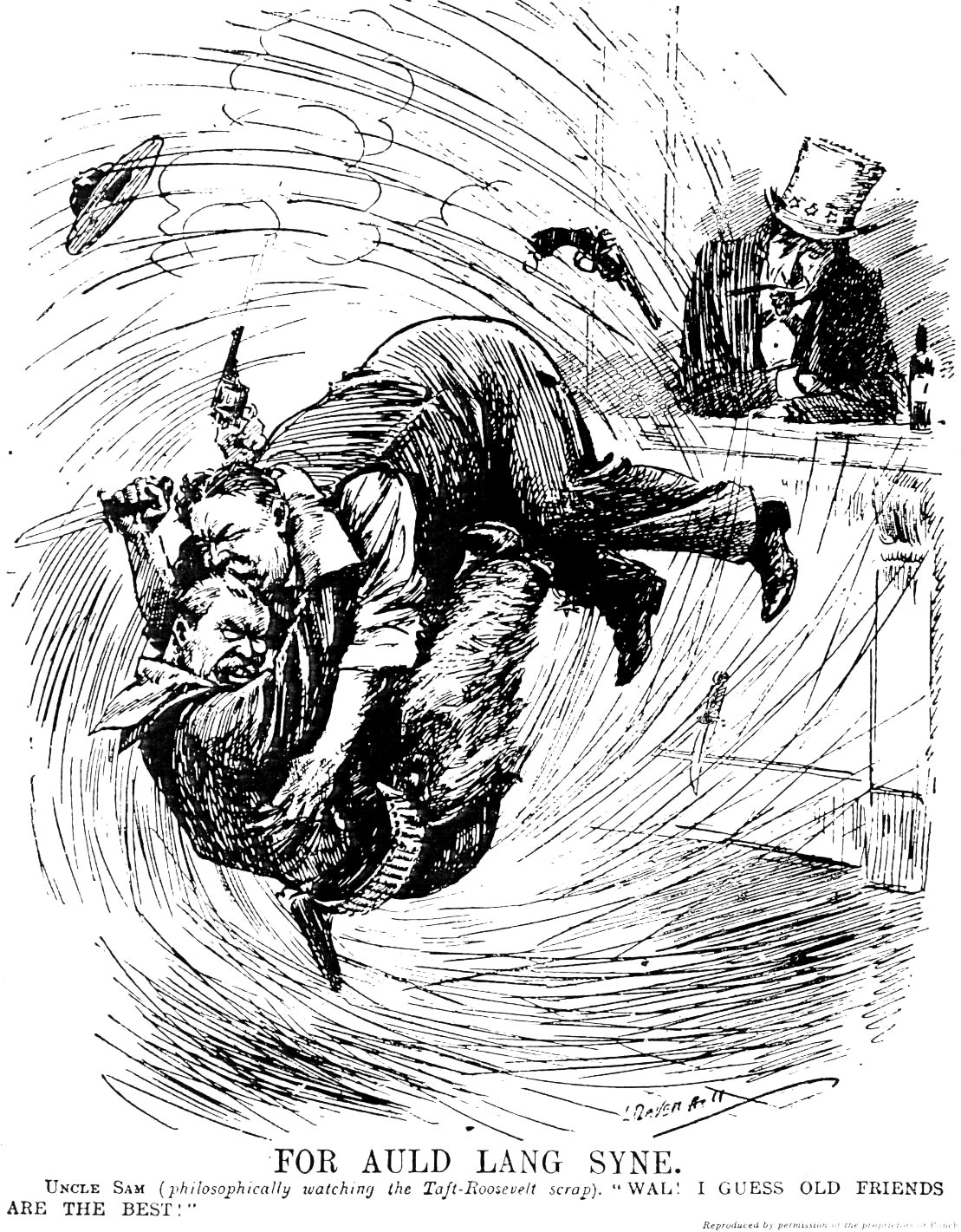
Taft and Roosevelt – political enemies in 1912

After the 1910 elections, Roosevelt continued to promote progressive ideals, a New Nationalism, much to Taft's dismay. Roosevelt attacked his successor's administration, arguing that its guiding principles were not that of the party of Lincoln, but those of the Gilded Age. The feud continued on and off through 1911, a year in which there were few elections of significance. Backed by many progressives, La Follette announced a run for the 1912 Republican nomination. Roosevelt received many letters from supporters urging him to run, and Republican office-holders were organizing on his behalf. Roosevelt believed these manifestations of public support represented a broader movement that would sweep him to the White House with a mandate to implement progressive policies. In February 1912, Roosevelt announced he would accept the Republican nomination if it was offered to him, and many progressives abandoned La Follette's candidacy and threw their support behind Roosevelt.

As Roosevelt became more radical in his progressivism, Taft was hardened in his resolve to achieve re-nomination, as he was convinced that the progressives threatened the very foundation of the government. While Roosevelt attacked both parties as corrupt and overly dependent on special interests, Taft feared that Roosevelt was becoming a demagogue. Despite Roosevelt's popularity, Taft still held the loyalty of many Republican leaders, giving him a major advantage in the race for delegates. In an effort to shore up his support, Taft hit the campaign trail, becoming the first sitting president to do so during a primary campaign. Roosevelt dominated the primaries, winning 278 of the 362 Republican delegates selected in primaries, but Taft's control of the party machinery proved critical in helping him win the bulk of the delegates decided at district or state conventions.

At the start of the 1912 Republican National Convention, Roosevelt challenged the election of many pro-Taft Southern delegates, but the RNC overruled most objections. Roosevelt's sole remaining chance to win the Republican nomination was through the election of a friendly convention chairman, but Elihu Root, by then a Taft ally, won election as chairman. Root made a crucial ruling that allowed contested delegates to vote on the seating of other contested delegates; a motion to defeat this ruling was offered by Roosevelt forces, but it failed in a 567–507 vote. As it became clear Roosevelt would bolt the party if not nominated, some Republicans sought a compromise candidate to avert the electoral disaster to come; they were unsuccessful. Taft's name was placed in nomination by Warren Harding, whose attempts to praise Taft and unify the party were met with angry interruptions from progressives. Taft was nominated on the first ballot, though most Roosevelt delegates refused to vote. Vice President Sherman was also nominated for a second term, making him the first incumbent vice president to win re-nomination since John C. Calhoun in 1828.

=== General election ===
1912 Electoral vote by state

GAUGOT, JULIEN. CAPT., U.S.A., RECEIVING MEDAL OF HONOR FROM PRESIDENT TAFT. (1912)

Alleging Taft had stolen the nomination, Roosevelt and his followers formed the Progressive Party, commonly known as the "Bull Moose Party". Taft knew he would almost certainly be defeated, but concluded that through Roosevelt's loss at Chicago the party had been preserved as "the defender of conservative government and conservative institutions". Seeing Roosevelt as the greater electoral threat, Democratic nominee Wilson spent little time attacking Taft, arguing that Roosevelt had been lukewarm in opposing the trusts during his presidency, and that Wilson was the true reformer. Reverting to the 19th century custom that presidents seeking re-election did not campaign, Taft retreated to the golf links. He spoke publicly only once, when making his nomination acceptance speech on August 1. He had difficulty in financing the campaign, as many industrialists had concluded he could not win and chose to support Wilson in order to block Roosevelt. Any remaining sense of optimism within the campaign evaporated when Vice President Sherman became seriously ill in October, and died six days before the election. In January (two months after the election), the Republican National Committee named Columbia University president Nicholas Murray Butler to replace Sherman and to receive his electoral votes.

Taft won only Utah and Vermont, for a total of eight electoral votes, which set a record for electoral vote futility by a Republican candidate that was later matched by Alf Landon in the 1936 election. Roosevelt won 88 electoral votes, while Wilson won 435; Wilson's share of the electoral vote represented the best Democratic showing since the 1852 election. In the popular vote, Wilson won 41.8 percent, while Roosevelt won 27.4 percent, and Taft took 23.2 percent. Democrats won control of not just the presidency but also both houses of Congress, giving them unified control of the executive and legislative branches for the first time since the 1894 elections.

== Historical reputation ==
William Howard Taft (1857-1930) (3514154047)

Inevitably linked with Roosevelt, Taft generally falls in the shadow of the man who chose him to be president, and who took it away four years later. Political scientist Peri Arnold writes that most historians view Taft as a "conservative interregnum between activist reformers Roosevelt and Wilson," adding that "there can be no doubt that Taft's hesitancy as a leader and politician produced few accomplishments during his term." Scott Bomboy for the National Constitution Center wrote that despite being "one of the most interesting, intellectual, and versatile presidents ... a chief justice of the United States, a wrestler at Yale, a reformer, a peace activist, and a baseball fan ... today, Taft is best remembered as the president who was so large that he got stuck in the White House bathtub," a story that is not true. Lurie argued that Taft did not receive the public credit for his policies that he should have, especially with regards to accelerating efforts to break up trusts. Taft, more quietly than his predecessor, filed many more cases than did Roosevelt, and rejected his predecessor's contention that there was such a thing as a "good" trust. This lack of flair marked Taft's presidency; according to Lurie, Taft "was boring—honest, likable, but boring". Mason called Taft's years in the White House "undistinguished". Coletta deemed Taft to have had a solid record of bills passed by Congress, but felt he could have accomplished more with political skill.

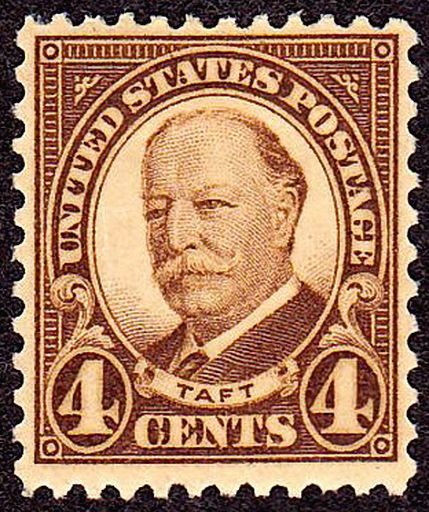
On June 4, 1930, the U.S. Post Office issued a 4-cent postage stamp to commemorate William Howard Taft's life.

Roosevelt engraved in public memory the image of Taft as a Buchanan-like figure, with a narrow view of the presidency which made him unwilling to act for the public good. Roosevelt was not alone in his negative assessment, as every major newspaper reporter of that time who left reminiscences of Taft's presidency was critical of him. Taft was convinced he would be vindicated by history. After he left office, he was estimated to be about in the middle of U.S. presidents by greatness, and subsequent rankings by historians have by and large sustained that verdict. In a 2017 C-SPAN survey 91 presidential historians ranked Taft 24th among the 43 former presidents, including then-president Barack Obama (unchanged from his ranking in 2009 and 2000). His rankings in the various categories of this most recent poll were as follows: public persuasion (31), crisis leadership (26), economic management (20), moral authority (25), international relations (21), administrative skills (12), relations with congress (23), vision/setting an agenda (28), pursued equal justice for all (22), performance with context of times (24). A 2018 poll of the American Political Science Association's Presidents and Executive Politics section ranked Taft as the 25th best president.

== Works cited and further reading ==
- Anderson, Donald F. (1973). William Howard Taft: A Conservative's Conception of the Presidency. Cornell University Press. ISBN 978-0-8014-0786-4.
- Anderson, Donald F. (Winter 1982). "The Legacy of William Howard Taft". Presidential Studies Quarterly. 12 (1): 26–33. JSTOR 27547774.
- Burns, Adam. "Fit to be president: William Howard Taft, sports and athleticism." European Journal of American Culture 40.2 (2021): 121–134. online
- Burns, Adam D. "Retentionist in chief: William Howard Taft and the question of Philippine independence, 1912–1916." Philippine Studies 61.2 (2013): 163–192. online
- Burns, Adam D. "Adapting to Empire: William H. Taft, Theodore Roosevelt, and the Philippines, 1900–08." Comparative American Studies: An International Journal 11.4 (2013): 418–433.
- Burns, Adam D. William Howard Taft and the Philippines: A Blueprint for Empire (University of Tennessee Press, 2020).
  - 2010 PhD version online
- Burton, David H. The Learned Presidency: Theodore Roosevelt, William Howard Taft, Wilson, Woodrow (1988)
- Burton, David H. (2004). William Howard Taft, Confident Peacemaker. Saint Joseph's University Press. ISBN 0-916101-51-7.
- Coletta, Paolo Enrico (1973). The Presidency of William Howard Taft. University Press of Kansas. ISBN 978-0700600960.
- Coletta, Paolo E. “The Diplomacy of Theodore Roosevelt and William Howard Taft.” In American Foreign Relations: A Historiographical Review, edited by Gerald K. Haines and Samuel J. Walker, 91–114. (Westport, CT: Greenwood Press, 1981).
- Coletta, Paolo E. William Howard Taft: A Bibliography (Meckler, 1989) 310pp comprehensive, annotated guide to published sources.
- Collin, Richard H. "Symbiosis versus Hegemony: New Directions in the Foreign Relations Historiography of Theodore Roosevelt and William Howard Taft." Diplomatic History 19.3 (1995): 473–497. online
- Dean, John W. (2004). Warren Harding (Kindle ed.). Henry Holt and Co. ISBN 0-8050-6956-9.
- Fine, Gary Alan, and, Christopher Robertson. "Reputation in Rupture: Broken Alliances and Relational Politics in the Roosevelt‐Taft Split" Sociological Forum (2020) 35:1, pages 73–94.
- German, James C. "Taft, Roosevelt, and United States Steel." The Historian 34.4 (1972): 598–613. https://doi.org/10.1111/j.1540-6563.1972.tb00430.x
- Goodwin, Doris Kearns. The Bully Pulpit: Theodore Roosevelt, William Howard Taft, and the Golden Age of Journalism (2013) excerpt
- Gould, Lewis L. (2014). Chief Executive to Chief Justice:Taft Betwixt the White House and Supreme Court. University Press of Kansas. ISBN 978-0-7006-2001-2.
- Gould, Lewis L. (2008). Four Hats in the Ring: The 1912 Election and the Birth of Modern American Politics. University Press of Kansas. ISBN 978-0-7006-1564-3.
- Gould, Lewis L. The William Howard Taft Presidency (UP of Kansas 2009) excerpt
- Graff, Henry F., ed. The Presidents: A Reference History (3rd ed. 2002) online
- Harris, Charles H. III; Sadler, Louis R. (2009). The Secret War in El Paso: Mexican Revolutionary Intrigue, 1906–1920. University of New Mexico Press. ISBN 978-0-8263-4652-0.
- Hawley, Joshua David (2008). Theodore Roosevelt: Preacher of Righteousness. Yale University Press. ISBN 978-0-300-14514-4.
- Hechler, Ken. Insurgency; personalities and politics of the Taft era (1964) online
- Korzi, Michael J. (2003). "Our Chief Magistrate and His Powers: A Reconsideration of William Howard Taft's "Whig" Theory of Presidential Leadership". Presidential Studies Quarterly. 33 (2): 305–324. doi:10.1111/j.1741-5705.2003.tb00031.x. JSTOR 27552486.
- Lurie, Jonathan (2011). William Howard Taft: Progressive Conservative. Cambridge University Press. ISBN 978-0-521-51421-7.
- Marose, Gregory. "TR, Taft, and Trusts: How two old friends fought over antitrust laws in 1912." Prologue-Quarterly Of The National Archives And Records Administration 44.3 (2012): 46–53.
- Morris, Edmund (2001). Theodore Rex. Random House. ISBN 978-0-394-55509-6.; biography of Roosevelt as president
- Mulhollan, Paige Elliott. "Philander C. Knox and Dollar Diplomacy, 1909-1913" (PhD dissertation The University of Texas at Austin, 1966.); online at ProQuest Dissertations & Theses
- Murphy, John (1995). "'Back to the Constitution': Theodore Roosevelt, William Howard Taft and Republican Party Division 1910–1912". Irish Journal of American Studies. 4: 109–126. JSTOR 30003333.
- Pavord, Andrew C. (Summer 1996). "The Gamble for Power: Theodore Roosevelt's Decision to Run for the Presidency in 1912". Presidential Studies Quarterly. 26 (3): 633–647. JSTOR 27551622.
- Pringle, Henry F. (1939). The Life and Times of William Howard Taft: A Biography. Vol. 1., covers the presidency
- Pringle, Henry F. (1939). The Life and Times of William Howard Taft: A Biography. Vol. 2.
- Republican campaign text-book 1912 (1912) online
- Rosen, Jeffrey. William Howard Taft (Times Books, 2018) short biography.
- Rubin, Ruth Bloch. "Organizing for Insurgency: Intraparty Organization and the Development of the House Insurgency, 1908–1910." Studies in American Political Development 27.2 (2013): 86–110 online Archived 2021-01-25 at the Wayback Machine.
- Scholes, Walter V; Scholes, Marie V. (1970). The Foreign Policies of the Taft Administration. University of Missouri Press. ISBN 0-8262-0094-X. [* Scholes, Walter V., and Marie V. Scholes. The Foreign Policies of the Taft Administration (1970). online free to borrow
- Solvick, Stanley D. "William Howard Taft and the Payne-Aldrich Tariff." Mississippi Valley Historical Review 50.3 (1963): 424–442 online.
- Solvick, Stanley D. "The Conservative as Progressive: William Howard Taft and the Politics of the Square Deal" Northwest Ohio Quarterly (1967) 39#3 pp 38–48.
- Solvick, Stanley D. "William Howard Taft and Cannonism" Wisconsin Magazine of History (1964) 48#1 pp: 48–58 online
- Solvick, Stanley Donald, " William Howard Taft and the progressive movement: A study in conservative thought and politics" (PhD dissertation, University of Michigan; ProQuest Dissertations & Theses, 1963. 6306955) Online at academic libraries.
- Trani, Eugene P. "Dollar Diplomacy." in Encyclopedia of American Foreign Policy: Studies of the Principal Movements and Ideas (1978): 1:268. online
- Weisman, Steven R. (2002). The Great Tax Wars: Lincoln to Wilson-The Fierce Battles over Money That Transformed the Nation. Simon & Schuster. ISBN 0-684-85068-0.
