= José Lorenzo Pesquera =

Puerto Rican politician (1882–1950)

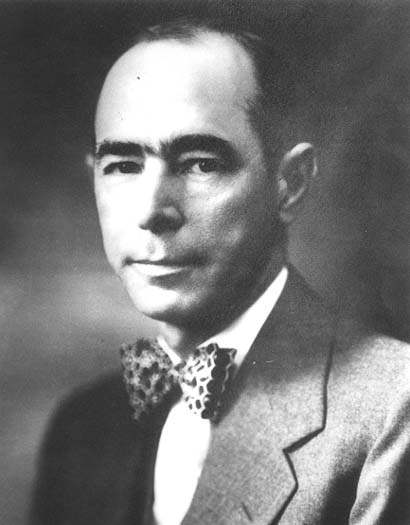

Resident Commissioner of Puerto Rico
- In office April 15, 1932 – March 3, 1933
- Preceded by: Félix Córdova Dávila
- Succeeded by: Santiago Iglesias

Personal details
- Born: August 10, 1882 Bayamón, Puerto Rico
- Died: July 25, 1950 (aged 67) Bayamón, Puerto Rico
- Resting place: Braulio Dueño Colón Municipal Cemetery, Bayamón, Puerto Rico
- Party: Independent
- Spouse: Encarnación López del Valle
- Education: Kutztown University; West Virginia University (LLB)

José Lorenzo Pesquera (August 10, 1882 – July 25, 1950) was an American politician who served as Resident Commissioner of Puerto Rico from 1932 to 1933.

== Early life ==
Born in Bayamón, Puerto Rico, Pesquera was graduated from Provincial Institute of Puerto Rico in 1897. He attended the Keystone State Normal School in Kutztown, Pennsylvania. in 1901 and 1902. He was graduated from the law department of West Virginia University at Morgantown in 1904. He was admitted to the bar the same year and commenced practice in Puerto Rico. He also engaged in agricultural pursuits and dairying. He served as member of the Puerto Rico House of Representatives 1917–1920. He served as director and president of the Agricultural Association of Puerto Rico. He was appointed as a Nonpartisan a Resident Commissioner to the United States to fill the vacancy caused by the resignation of Félix Córdova Dávila and served from April 15, 1932, until March 3, 1933. He was not a candidate for election in 1932. He returned to his law practice and agricultural interests. He died in Bayamón, Puerto Rico, July 25, 1950, and was interred in Braulio Dueño Colón Municipal Cemetery in Bayamón, Puerto Rico.

== See also ==
- List of Hispanic Americans in the United States Congress

== Sources ==
- United States Congress. "José Lorenzo Pesquera (id: P000249)". Biographical Directory of the United States Congress.

U.S. House of Representatives
Preceded by Félix Córdova Dávila	Resident Commissioner of Puerto Rico; 1932–1933	Succeeded by Santiago Iglesias
