= Inauguration of William Howard Taft =

31st United States presidential inauguration

Presidential inauguration of William Howard Taft
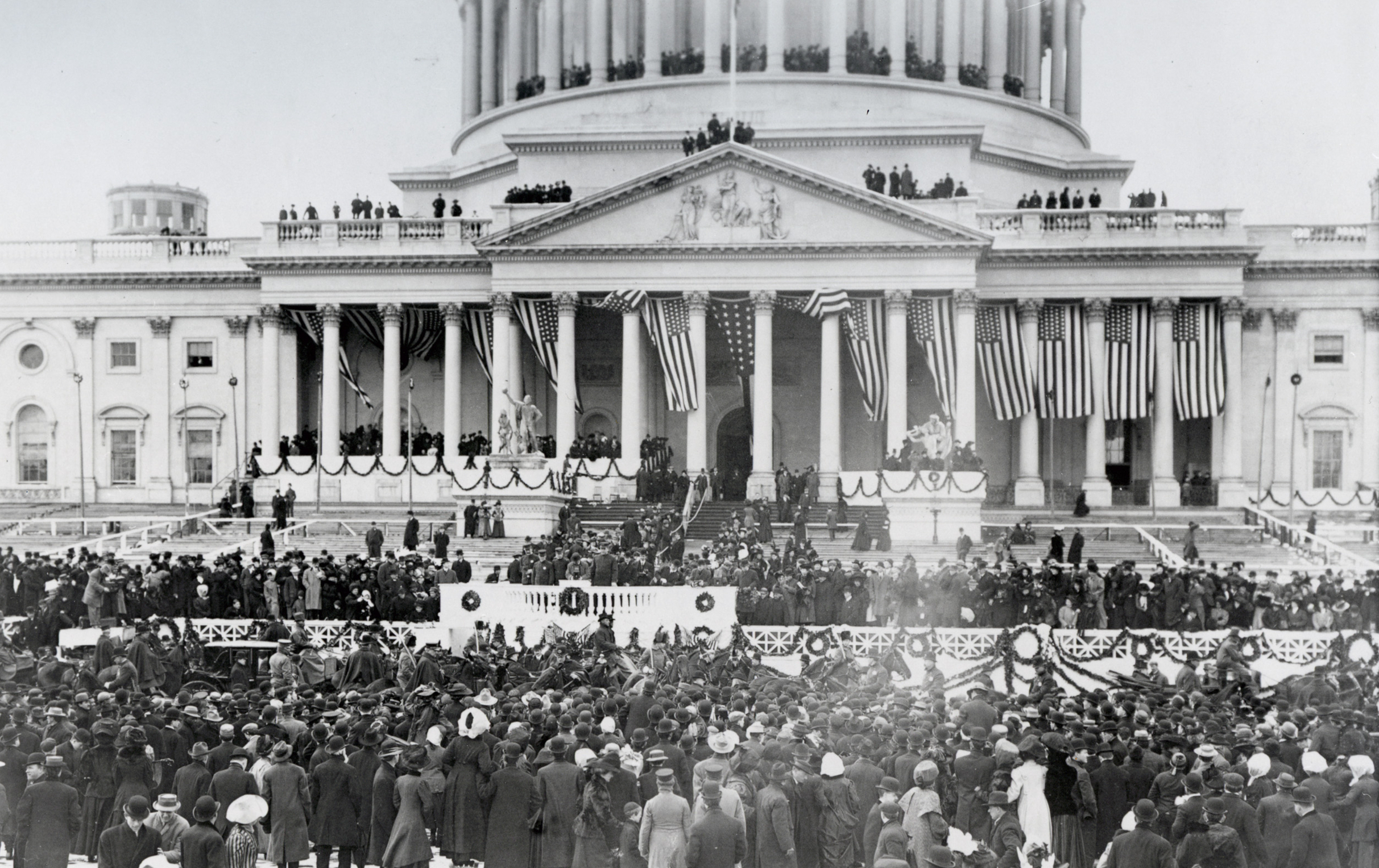
- Date: March 4, 1909; 117 years ago
- Location: United States Capitol, Washington, D.C.
- Organized by: Joint Congressional Committee on Inaugural Ceremonies
- Participants: William Howard Taft; 27th president of the United States — Assuming office Melville Fuller; Chief Justice of the United States — Administering oath James S. Sherman; 27th vice president of the United States — Assuming office Charles W. Fairbanks; 26th vice president of the United States — Administering oath

The inauguration of William Howard Taft as the 27th president of the United States was held on Thursday, March 4, 1909, at the Senate chamber inside the United States Capitol, Washington, D.C., instead of the regular East Portico due to a blizzard. This was the 31st inauguration and marked the commencement of the only term of both William Howard Taft as president and of James S. Sherman as vice president.

As Sherman died 3 years, 240 days into this term, the office remained vacant for the balance: he was the last vice president to leave office intra-term prior to the ratification of the Twenty-fifth Amendment in 1967 (excluding Calvin Coolidge, Harry S. Truman and Lyndon B. Johnson, who ascended to the presidency after the deaths of their predecessors), which constitutionally allows for filling a vacancy in the office of vice president, and as of 2026, is also the most recent vice president to die in office.

== Inaugural ceremonies and festivities ==
Due to a blizzard the night before that covered Washington, D.C., with 10 inches of snow, the inauguration was moved indoors, into the Senate chamber. The presidential oath of office was administered by Chief Justice Melville Fuller, who was doing so for his sixth and final time. The Chief Justice flubbed his lines. The new President took his oath on a century-old Bible belonging to the Supreme Court, which he used again in 1921 to take his oath as the Chief Justice of the United States. Despite the adverse weather conditions, the inaugural parade was not cancelled. 6,000 city workers used 500 wagons to remove 58,000 tons of snow to clean the parade route. For the first time in inauguration history, the incoming First Lady (in this case Helen Herron Taft) joined her husband in leading the parade from the Capitol to the White House. Probably during the parade, the choral march "Our Country" by Arthur Whiting was played.

An inaugural ball that evening was held at the Pension Building. It was the last official inaugural ball until 1949, as Taft's successor as president, Woodrow Wilson, asked the city of Washington not to hold it, thereby putting a temporary end to the practice. The tradition of inaugural balls was revived in 1949 as part of the second inauguration of Harry S. Truman.

== Gallery ==
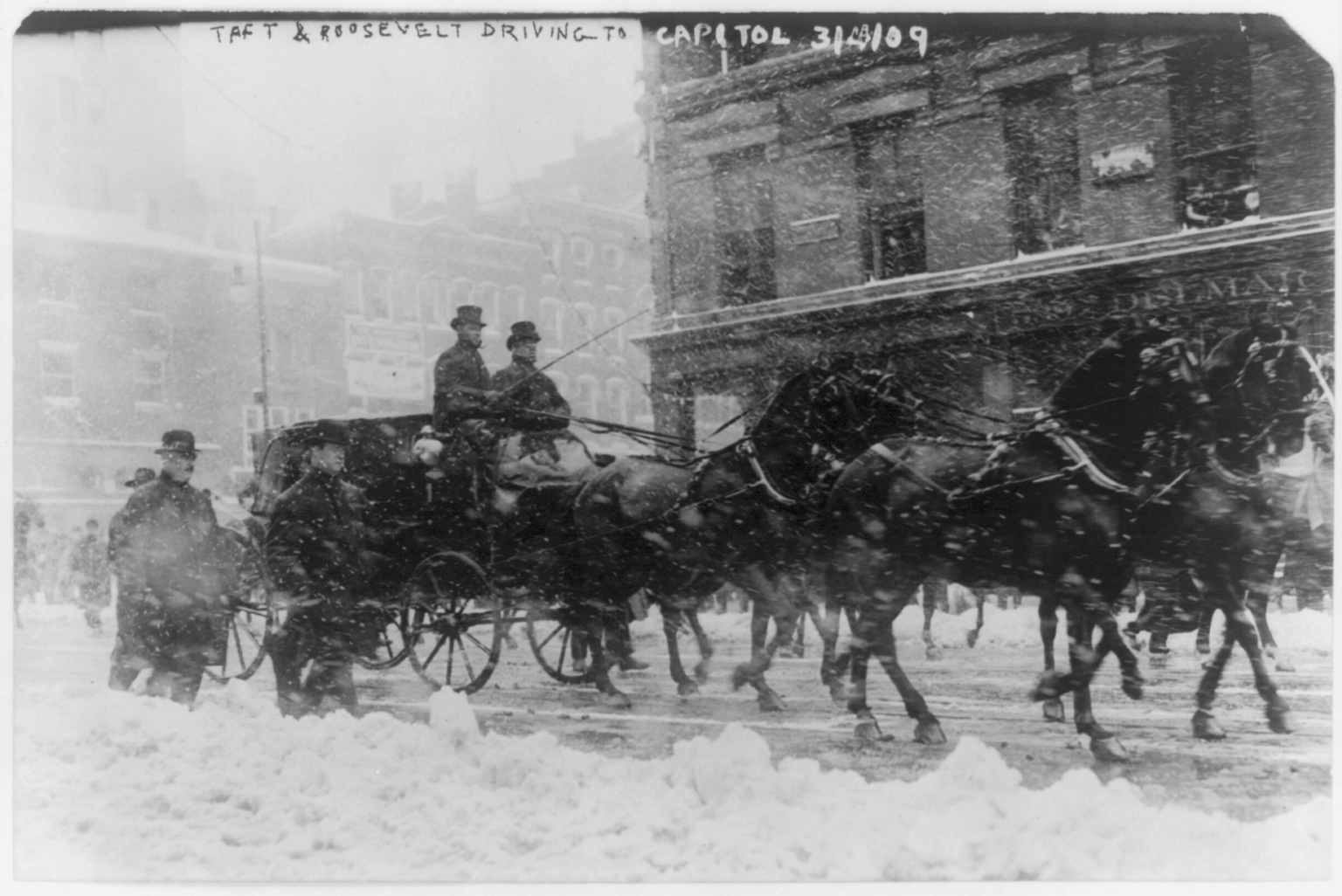
Presidents Taft and Roosevelt driving to Capitol

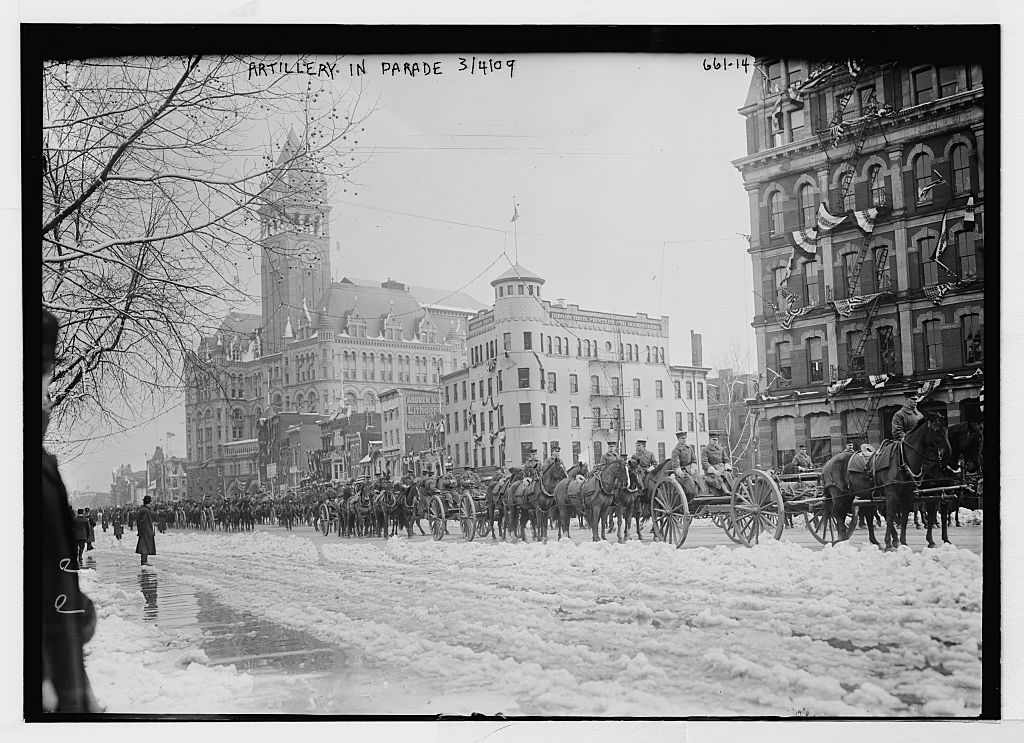
Inaugural parade for Taft at Pennsylvania Avenue

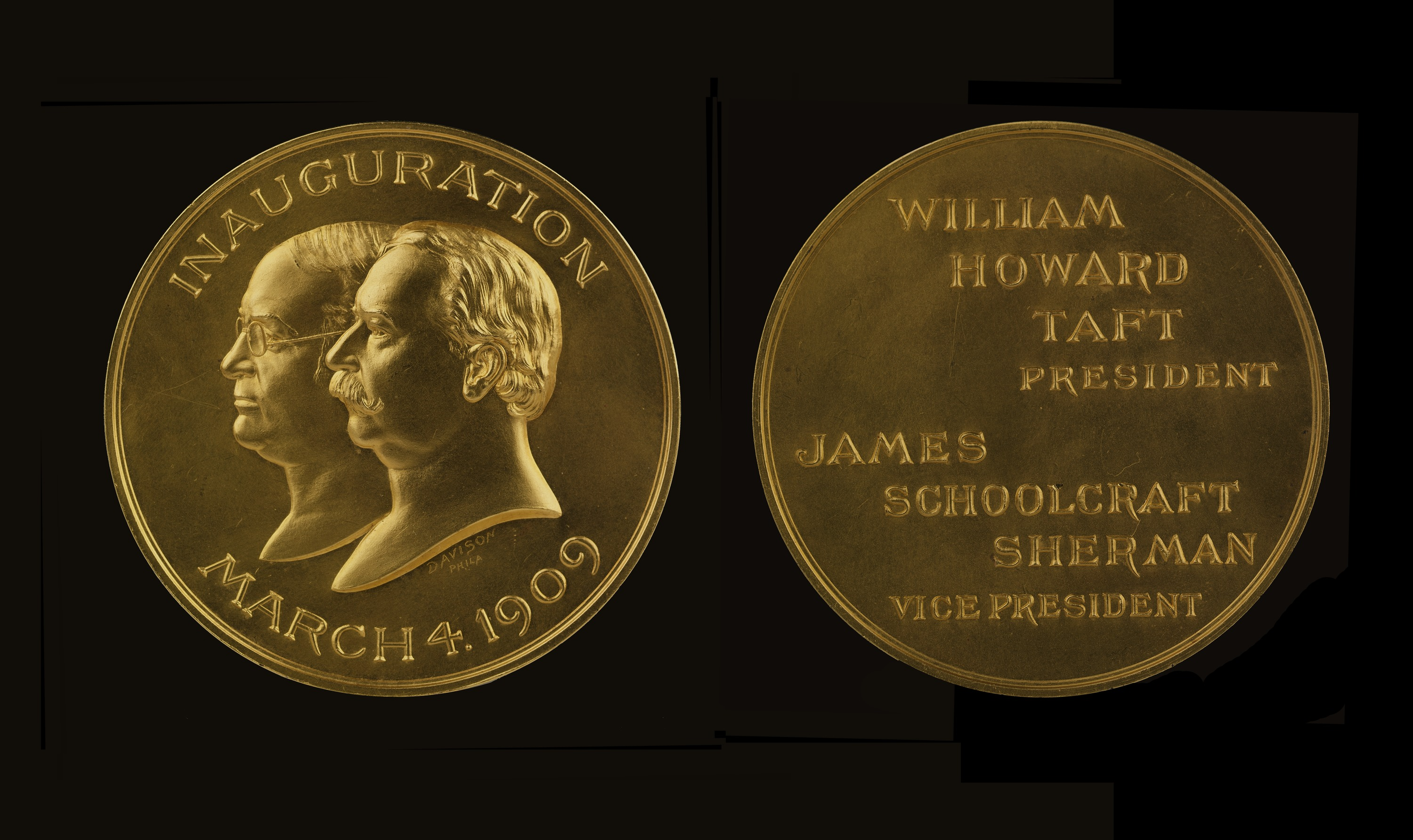
William Howard Taft Presidential Inaugural Medal

== See also ==
- Presidency of William Howard Taft
- 1908 United States presidential election
