= Bolívar Pagán =

Puerto Rican politician (1897–1961)

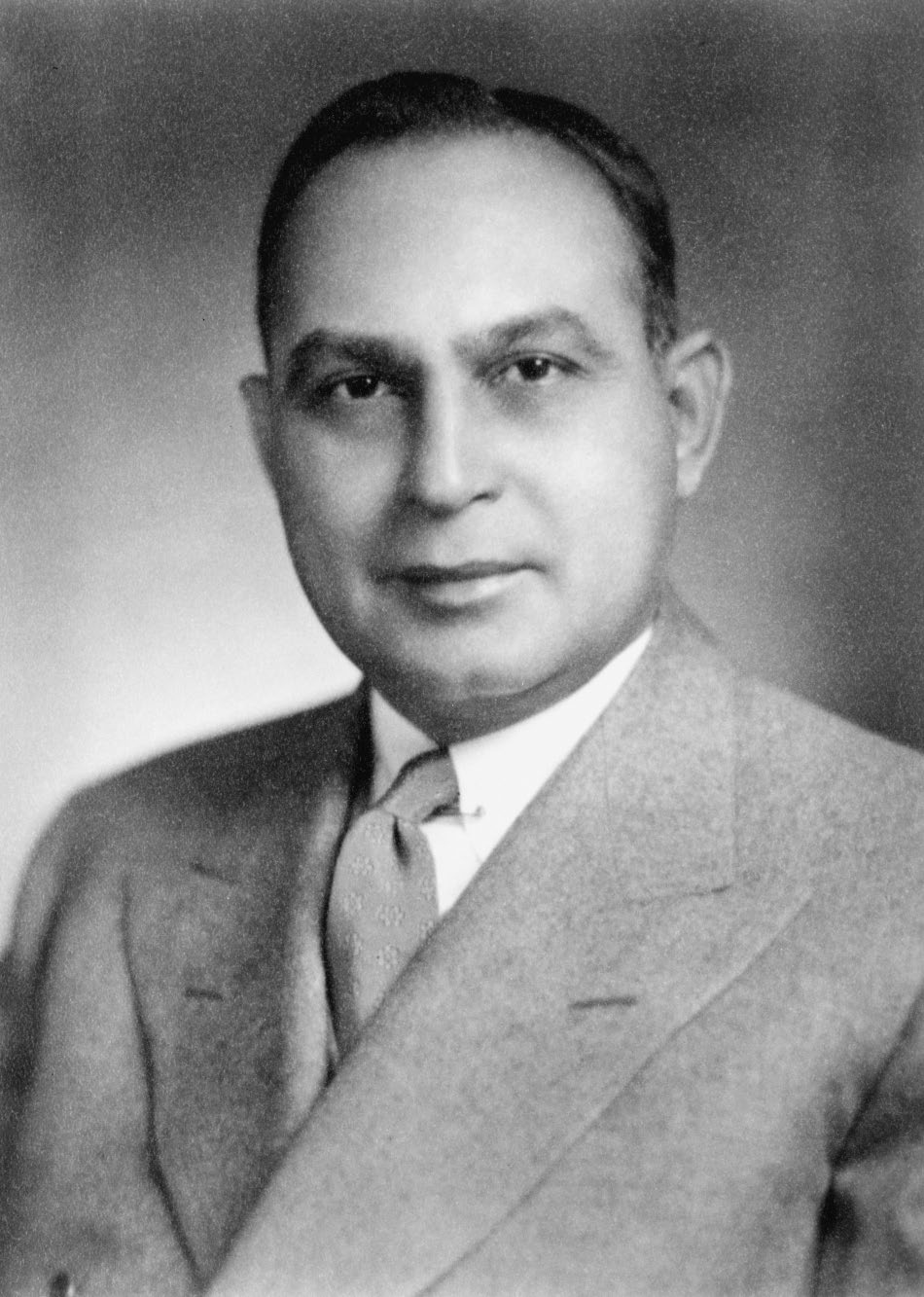

Resident Commissioner of Puerto Rico
- In office December 26, 1939 – January 3, 1945
- Preceded by: Santiago Iglesias
- Succeeded by: Jesús T. Piñero

President pro tempore of the Puerto Rico Senate
- In office 1933–1939
- Preceded by: Celestino Iriarte Miró
- Succeeded by: Luis Padrón Rivera

Member of the Puerto Rico Senate from the at-large district
- In office 1933–1939
- In office 1945–1952

Personal details
- Born: Bolívar Pagán Lucca; May 16, 1897 Guayanilla, Puerto Rico
- Died: February 9, 1961 (aged 63) San Juan, Puerto Rico
- Resting place: Puerto Rico Memorial Cemetery in Carolina, Puerto Rico
- Party: Republican Union
- Other political affiliations: Socialist
- Education: University of Puerto Rico School of Law (LLB)

Bolívar Pagán Lucca (May 16, 1897 – February 9, 1961) was a Puerto Rican historian, journalist, and politician.

== Early years ==
Pagán was born in Guayanilla, Puerto Rico. He received his primary education in the public schools of Adjuntas, and went to secondary school in the city of Ponce. While still in school in Ponce High School, he was a contributor to the newspapers El Día, Nosotros, Renacimiento, and Puerto Rico Ilustrado and editor to both La Idea and La Aurora. In 1919 Pagán became the vice president of the Socialist Party of Puerto Rico, a pro-statehood, pro-labor party (not to be confused with the Puerto Rican Socialist Party founded in the 1970s).

== Schooling ==
In 1921 he graduated with a law degree from the University of Puerto Rico School of Law; the same year he was admitted to the bar and began to practice law in San Juan. The following year he served as judge of Fajardo, Puerto Rico.

== Political career ==
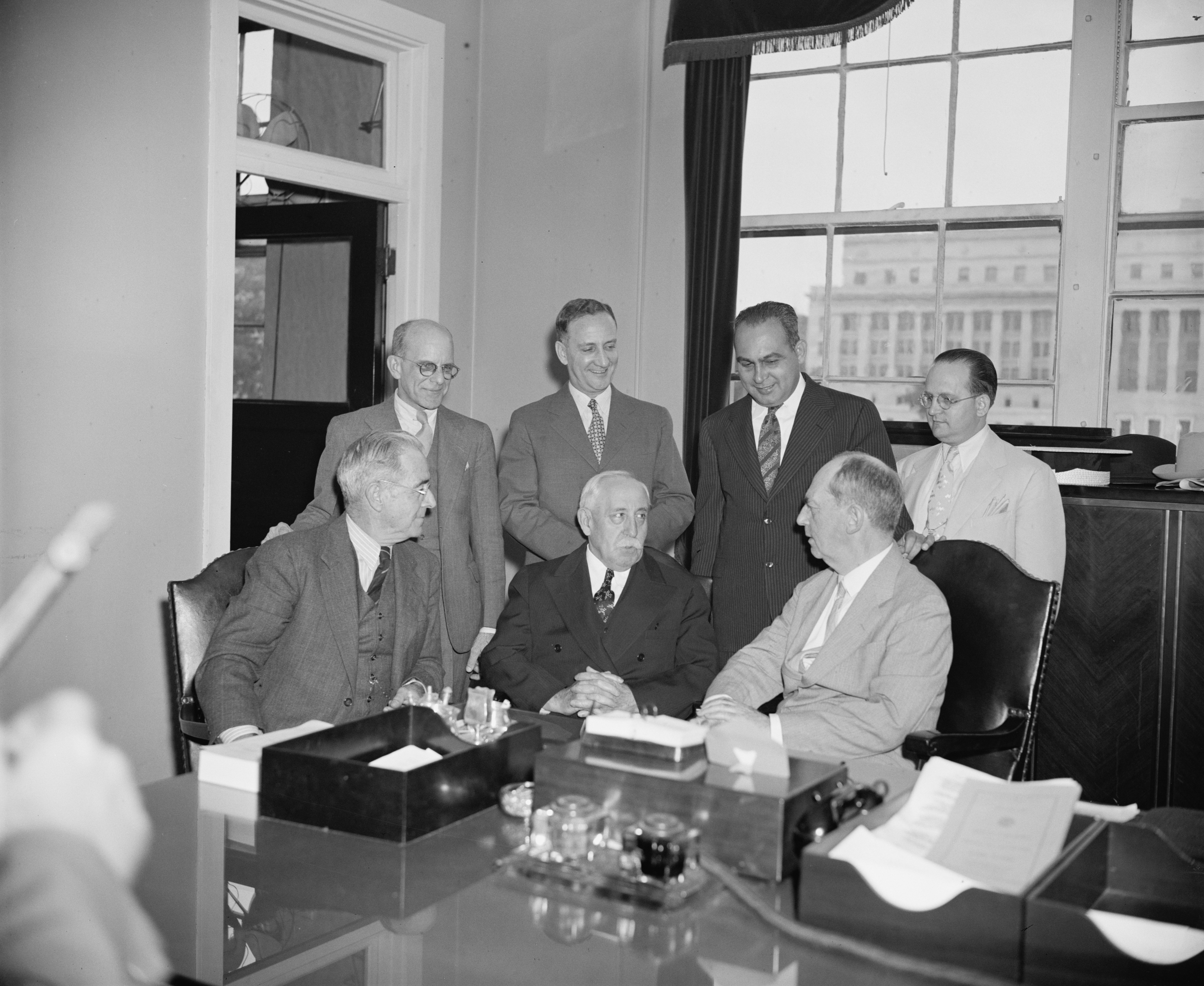
Pagán (standing, second from right) confers with Admiral William D. Leahy, Governor of Puerto Rico (seated, right), and other Puerto Rican officials, June 14, 1939

In 1924, Pagán ran unsuccessfully as a Socialist Party of Puerto Rico candidate for election to the Puerto Rican Senate. The following year, he began a four-year tenure as city treasurer of San Juan. In 1928, he ran again for the Puerto Rican Senate, but was not elected. He succeeded on his third try, and served as a member of the Puerto Rican Senate from 1933 until 1939, rising to leadership positions such as president pro-tempore and majority floor leader. While in the Puerto Rican Senate, he worked on legislation of social and cultural importance, such as universal suffrage, workers' compensation, and the creation of the Instituto de Literatura Puertorriqueña. He also served as mayor for the city of San Juan, Puerto Rico in 1936 till 1937.

In 1939 Pagán was appointed Resident Commissioner to the U.S. House of Representatives by the Governor of Puerto Rico, William Leahy, to fill the vacancy caused by the death of Pagán's father-in-law, Santiago Iglesias. In 1940, he was elected Resident Commissioner under the auspices of a coalition between the Socialist Party and the Republican Union.

In the 78th Congress Pagán was appointed to serve on the Committees on Agriculture, Labor, and the Territories. The following Congress, in addition to the previous committee assignments, he was appointed to the Committees on Insular Affairs, Military Affairs, and Naval Affairs. In Congress he continued the work of his father-in-law and successfully advocated the extension of social security benefits to Puerto Rico, and the application of workers' compensation laws to the Island.

Pagán pushed for Puerto Ricans to elect their own governors. He introduced a number of bills to achieve this, but they were not passed during his tenure. In addition, he brought to the attention of Congress the dissatisfaction of some Puerto Ricans with Governor Rexford G. Tugwell. Pagán returned to Puerto Rico, and was again elected to the Senate of Puerto Rico, was reelected in 1948, and served until 1953.

== Later years ==
He resumed his law practice in San Juan until his death on February 9, 1961. He was buried at the Puerto Rico Memorial Cemetery in Carolina, Puerto Rico.

== Major publications ==
- Historia de los Partidos Politicos Puertorriqueños (1898-1956). Librería Campos, San Juan, Puerto Rico, 1959.
- America y Otras Paginas. Imprenta La Correspondencia, San Juan, Puerto Rico, 1922.
- Ley Municipal Revisada, Anotada y Comentada. Imprenta La Correspondencia, San Juan, Puerto Rico, 1925.
- Ideales en Marcha. Imprenta Venezuela, San Juan, Puerto Rico, 1939.
- Puerto Rico: The Next State. Imprenta Dwyer, Washington, D.D., 1942.
- Crónicas de Washington. Editorial Stylo, Ciudad de Mejico, Mejico, 1949.
- Historia de los Partidos Politicos Puertorriqueños. Litografía Real Hermanos, Inc., San Juan, Puerto Rico, 1959.

== See also ==
- List of Puerto Ricans
- List of Hispanic Americans in the United States Congress
- United States Congress. "Bolívar Pagán (id: P000013)". Biographical Directory of the United States Congress.

Senate of Puerto Rico
Preceded by Celestino Iriarte Miró	President pro tempore of the Puerto Rico Senate; 1933–1939	Succeeded by Luis Padrón Rivera
Political offices
Preceded by Jesus Benitez Castaño	Mayor of San Juan; 1936–1937	Succeeded by Carlos de Castro
U.S. House of Representatives
Preceded by Santiago Iglesias	Resident Commissioner of Puerto Rico; 1939–1945	Succeeded by Jesús T. Piñero
