= America Iglesias Thatcher =

América Iglesias Thatcher (November 4, 1907 – April 20, 1989) was a Puerto-Rican-American labor activist and the daughter of Puerto Rico's Resident Commissioner Santiago Iglesias.

== Early life ==
Thatcher was the daughter of Puerto Rico's Resident Commissioner Santiago Iglesias. She had seven sisters, named Libertad, Igualdad, Justicia, Paz, Luz, Fraternidad and Victory. The unusual names of her sisters resulted in the family being featured in Ripley's Believe it or Not.

== Career ==
Thatcher served as a crypto-analyst during World War II and later became an interpreter and translator in the Los Angeles court system. She founded the International Translation Bureau in 1947.

She worked as a translator in the office of American Federation of Labor President William Green, and also worked for the Pan-American Union. She was also the secretary for the Central Spanish Relief Committee for Republican Spain.

She worked as staff for Rose Pesotta and helped organise garment workers. Correspondence between Pesotta and Thatcher was widely cited in Elaine Leeder's 1993 book The Gentle General: Rose Pesotta, Anarchist and Labor Organizer.

== Death ==
She died in Los Angeles, aged 81.
