= María Martínez Acosta =

Puerto Rican politician

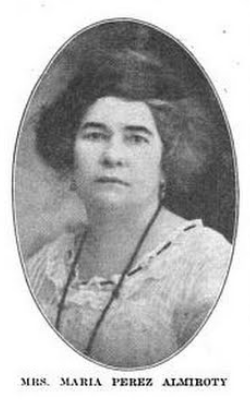
- María Martínez Acosta, from a 1922 publication.

At-large Member of the Senate of Puerto Rico
- In office 1937–1941

Acting leader of the Liberal Party
- In office 1938–1938
- Preceded by: Antonio Rafael Barceló
- Succeeded by: Maria Antonia Josefina

Personal details
- Born: María Martínez Acosta; March 18, 1881 Cabo Rojo, Puerto Rico
- Died: July 1, 1977 (aged 96)
- Party: Liberal Party
- Spouse: Federico Pérez Almiroty
- Education: University of Puerto Rico
- Occupation: Teacher

María Martínez Acosta, a.k.a., María Martínez Acosta de Pérez Almiroty (18 March 1881 — 1 July 1977) was a Puerto Rican teacher, clubwoman and the first woman to be elected senator in Puerto Rico. She is one of the twelve women honored with a plaque in "La Plaza en Honor a la Mujer Puertorriqueña" (Plaza in Honor of Puerto Rican Women) in San Juan.

== Early life ==
Martínez Acosta was born in Cabo Rojo, Puerto Rico. Moved to Ponce, Puerto Rico, the daughter of Carmelo Martínez Rivas and Elvira Acosta de Martínez. Her brother, Carmelo Martínez Acosta, was a journalist. She finished a teacher training course at the University of Puerto Rico in 1904.

== Career ==
In 1922, Martínez Acosta was president of the Woman's Civic Club, working on children's health issues. Soon after Puerto Rican women gained full voting rights, Perez Almiroty became the first woman to be elected to the Senate of Puerto Rico, when she won a seat as an at-large senator in the 1936 elections, representing the Liberal Party. As Puerto Rico's only woman senator, she was one of the leaders who signed a 1939 protest letter to the United States Senate, against a labor treaty which would restrict the work of women in dependent territories. She was briefly the acting leader of the Liberal Party in 1938, after the death of Antonio Rafael Barceló. She did not contest the 1940 elections.

== Personal life and legacy ==
Martínez Acosta married Federico Pérez Almiroty, an attorney. They had two children, Blanca and Federico. She was often known by the name 'María Martínez Acosta de Pérez Almiroty' which, under Spanish customs, alludes not only to the fact she is married but also to what family her husband comes from.

She is one of the twelve women honored with a plaque in the "Plaza en Honor a la Mujer Puertorriqueña" (Plaza in Honor of Puerto Rican Women) in San Juan. There is a public elementary school named for Pérez Almiroty in San Juan. She lived a teachers retirement home until her death on July 1, 1977 at age 96. She was buried at the Puerto Rico Memorial Cemetery in Carolina, Puerto Rico.

A biography of Martínez Acosta, Sara R. Bonilla del Rio's María Martínez de Pérez Almiroty: Los primeros pasos de la mujer en el Senado, was published in 2015.

== See also ==
- List of Puerto Ricans
- History of women in Puerto Rico
