= General Confederation of Workers (Puerto Rico) =

Trade union

The General Confederation of Workers (Spanish: Confederación General de Trabajadores, CGT) was a union federation in Puerto Rico.

The CGT was formed in March 1940 at a congress held in San Juan. The congress was attended by delegates from 42 unions, and it had an initial membership of 72,000. The small Puerto Rican Communist Party played a leading role in its development. One offshoot of the General Confederation of Workers is the similarly named General Confederation of Farmers.

The CGT quickly surpassed the older Free Federation of Workers (FLT) as the largest union federation in Puerto Rico. It affiliated with the US Congress of Industrial Organizations (CIO) in 1949, and like the CIO it organized workers based on industrial unionism. As the CGT grew closer politically to the Popular Democratic Party (PPD), the radical wing of the federation broke off and formed the General Confederation of Workers (Authentic).
