= Communist Party of Puerto Rico =

Political party

Communist Party of Puerto Rico Partido Comunista de Puerto Rico
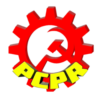
- Founded: 2010
- Preceded by: Puerto Rican Communist Party
- Newspaper: Abayarde Rojo
- Ideology: Communism; Marxism–Leninism; Anti-imperialism
- Political position: Far-left
- National affiliation: Socialist Front
- Regional affiliation: São Paulo Forum
- Colors: Red

The Communist Party of Puerto Rico (Spanish: Partido Comunista de Puerto Rico, PCPR) is a communist party in Puerto Rico. The party was founded in 2010, after members reformed a previous organization called "Refundación Comunista".

It operates a political training school called "Escuela Vladimir Lenin", that brings proletarian political education to schools, universities, and workers' councils. A similar effort, the "Escuela Manuel Francisco Rojas", was created online to reach an ever-growing group of people connected to the web and social networks. It also publishes Abayarde Rojo, a weekly periodical that is directed to tackling the reality of Puerto Rico and class struggle.

== See also ==
- Communist Party USA
