= Free Federation of Workers =

1899 union federation in Puerto Rico

The Free Federation of Workers (Spanish: Federación Libre de Trabajadores, FLT) was a union federation in Puerto Rico. It was founded in 1899 and initially led by Santiago Iglesias Pantín. Its political arm became the Socialist Party, founded in 1915.

It affiliated with the American Federation of Labor in October 1901, and it grew increasingly close to the AFL's conservative approach to unionism. This led to the creation of the rival General Confederation of Workers (CGT) in the 1930s. The FLT and CGT later merged and formed the basis of the Puerto Rico Federation of Labor.
