= Socialist Party (Puerto Rico) =

Puerto Rican political party (1899–1956)

- Logo used by the party for the 1948 election
- Founded: July 18, 1899; 127 years ago
- Dissolved: November 4, 1956; 69 years ago
- Succeeded by: Popular Democratic Party
- Ideology: Democratic socialism; Socialism; Pro-Statehood
- Political position: Left-wing
- Colors: Red

The Socialist Party (Spanish: Partido Socialista, PS), also known as the Socialist Workers' Party (Partido Socialista Obrero), was a pro-statehood political party in Puerto Rico, that also contemplated independence in the case that entry into the American Union was denied by Congress. The party was concerned with improving the social welfare of Puerto Ricans.

It was founded on 18 July 1899 as the Labor Party (Partido Obrero), and was also known as the Socialist Worker's Party (Spanish: Partido Obrero Socialista) by Santiago Iglesias Pantín, an early leader of the Puerto Rican labor movement who was influenced by the Socialist Labor Party of America. It was formally re-founded as the PS on March 21, 1915, in the town of Cayey. It originally served as the political arm of the Free Federation of Workers, which became the Puerto Rican branch of the American Federation of Labor. The party was an affiliate of the Socialist Party of America.

In Puerto Rican elections, the Socialist Party garnered 24,468 votes in 1917 (14 percent) and 59,140 votes in 1920 (23.5 percent). Over time, Iglesias and the Socialists became more in favor of statehood and worked with the pro-annexation Republican Party, joining them in an electoral alliance known as the Coalition which dominated island politics from 1932 to 1940. The Socialists won seven seats to the island's constitutional convention, which convened between 1951 and 1952.

== Demise ==
The party disbanded before elections in 1956, and the leadership directed party members to join the Popular Democratic Party (PPD).
