= Seal of Institute of Puerto Rican Culture (Jorge Soto Version) =

Artwork created by Nuyorican artist Jorge Soto

The Seal of the Institute of Puerto Rican Culture (Jorge Soto Version) is an artwork created circa 1975 by Nuyorican artist Jorge Soto. Based on the original design, Soto's version distorts and abstracts the seal as a means to critique its representation of Puerto Rican culture.

== Background ==
=== Jorge Soto ===
Jorge Soto (b. 1947- d.1987) was a Nuyorican artist born El Barrio, New York. In his early years, he turned to art as a means to deal with the trauma of growing up in the poverty and violence of the inner city, a theme that would inform his reinterpretation of the seal. In 1971, he began working with the collaborators of the Taller Boricua artists' workshop, whose art reflected an ideological re-envisioning of the “roots” of Puerto Rican culture and attempted to reconcile this with the experiences of the Puerto Rican diaspora. This was referred to as “Afro-Taíno consciousness” and was the basis for Soto's recreation of the seal.

=== Original seal ===
The original seal of the Institute of Puerto Rican Culture, or ICP, was commissioned by the institute's director, Ricardo Alegría, in 1955, and designed by Lorenzo Homar, a well-known Puerto Rican visual artist at the time. The design depicted three figures: a Spanish caballero or knight standing in the center carrying a book, a male Taíno Indian to his left bearing a stone carving, and an African man to his right holding a drum. The seal's representation of Puerto Rican culture has been the subject of critique since its adoption by the ICP for its overemphasis of the importance of European culture to Puerto Rico and its lack of female representation.

== Soto's version ==
In Soto's version of the seal, all three of the figures of the original are present, but are stripped of their clothing and distorted in various ways. The Spanish caballero is represented by a skeleton wearing a conquistador's helmet while holding a skull wearing Uncle Sam's hat – an acknowledgement of the two major colonizing forces that have played important roles in the island's history and culture.

The Taíno Indian of the original is represented as a “voluptuous” and “fecund” hermaphroditic figure with large thighs and a spiral detail over its abdomen suggesting a womb. Its birdlike head is shown merging with a representation of “Yoka Hu,” the Taíno god of life force, who stands in contrast of the Spanish/U.S. symbolism of death. This has also been interpreted by scholar Juan Flores as a critique of the colonial gender system and the patriarchal quality of the dominant narrative of Puerto Rican history, something that is reflected in the original seal's lack of any feminine symbolism.

The African figure is depicted carrying a skull wearing a conquistador's helmet in one hand and a rapier in the other. This element in particular has led to diverging interpretations. Flores suggests the rapier is the weapon with which the African has beheaded the conquistador, but his view is contested by Yasmín Ramírez of the Taller Boricua Center. Ramírez instead suggests that the rapier should be interpreted as a reference to the rituals of syncretic Afro-Caribbean religions such as Candomblé and Santería, in which they serve to beat drums. The drum's replacement by the skull, she argues, can then be understood as having the power to "connect individuals to the minds of their ancestors". Furthermore, the figure's face is split in two, something that she interprets as a reference to the Yoruba and Kongo cultures, both of which were brought to Puerto Rico under the slave trade.
