= Ricardo Alegría =

Puerto Rican scholar, anthropologist, archeologist

- Born: Ricardo Enrique Alegría Gallardo; April 14, 1921; San Juan, Puerto Rico
- Died: July 7, 2011 (aged 90); San Juan, Puerto Rico
- Burial place: Santa María Magdalena de Pazzis Cemetery
- Occupations: Professor and anthropologist
- Title: Director and professor

Academic background
- Education: University of Puerto Rico, BS archaeology University of Chicago, MA anthropology and history Harvard University, Ph.D. anthropology, 1954

Academic work
- Discipline: Anthropology
- Sub-discipline: Cultural anthropology
- Institutions: Institute of Puerto Rican Culture; University of Puerto Rico

Ricardo Enrique Alegría Gallardo (April 14, 1921 – July 7, 2011) was a Puerto Rican scholar, author, cultural anthropologist, and archaeologist known as the "father of modern Puerto Rican archaeology". He was a professor at the University of Puerto Rico and the first director of the Institute of Puerto Rican Culture. His research focused on indigenous prehistory. Alegria was the founder of the Museo de las Américas and of the Alpha Beta Chi fraternity. His father, José S. Alegría, was a former vice president and founding member of the Puerto Rican Nationalist Party. It was Alegría's father who instilled in him a sense of love and pride for Puerto Rico, its history, and culture. He received his primary and secondary education in San Juan, before attending the University of Puerto Rico (UPR). While there Alegría and Yamil Galib founded a new fraternity, Alpha Beta Chi. In 1942, Alegría earned his Bachelor of Science degree in archeology from the University of Puerto Rico. He continued his academic education at the University of Chicago where in 1947 he earned his master's in Anthropology and History.

In 1954, Alegría earned his Ph.D. (doctorate) in Anthropology from Harvard University. Governor Luis Muñoz Marín named Alegría the first director of the Institute of Puerto Rican Culture in the late 1950s. Alegría established the Center of Popular Arts, the Institute of Puerto Rican book publishing division. Alegría was responsible for the renovation and restoration of historical Old San Juan under the leadership of the San Juan mayor Felisa Rincón de Gautier. He also spearheaded the restoration of the ruins of the Caparra Archaeological Site and Fortín de San Gerónimo. As a result of his work Old San Juan was declared a Historical World Treasure.

In 1976, Alegría opened the Center for Advanced Studies on Puerto Rico and the Caribbean (CEAPRC). In 1992, he established the Museo de las Américas. He also formed the General Archive of Puerto Rico and the Puerto Rican Theater Festival. Alegría was also a professor at the University of Puerto Rico, where he created the Archaeological Research Center. Alegría was a pioneer in the anthropologic studies of the Taíno culture and the African heritage in Puerto Rico. Caribbean Business points out that, "His extensive studies have helped historians understand how the Taínos lived and suffered, before and after the Spanish conquistadors arrived on the island." Alegría estimated that about one-third of all Puerto Ricans have Taíno ancestry—results of recent DNA studies have suggested he may be right.

== Early life ==
=== Lineage ===
Alegría was born to José Santos Alegría and Luisa Celestina Gallardo Veronne at San Francisco street No. 409 at San Juan, a seven-room house that was property of his mother's family, and was brought into the world by physician Luis Biamón. He was the younger of four siblings born to the couple including José Esteban (1916), María Antonieta (1917) and Félix Luis (1918). Alegría has another brother on his paternal line named Gilberto. He was named after a distant relative on his maternal side, who had died young.

His father was a lawyer, teacher, painter (disciple of Francisco Oller among others), journalist author and editor/director of magazines that included Puerto Rico Ilustrado. His grandfather was a military captain and merchant from Gipuzkoa named Cruz Alegría Arizmendi, who served as mayor of the municipality of Dorado, Puerto Rico in 1882-83 and 1885–86. Following the Spanish-American the conservative Spaniard lost his influence. In turn, his father had adopted liberal leanings since his youth and he entered politics by creating a Youth Committee for the Federal Party's youth at Barceloneta in 1902, joining and organizing Unión Puertorriqueña at Manatí two years later.

Afterwards, José Alegría would earn a degree in law from Valparaiso University, serving as municipal judge of several municipalities upon returning to Puerto Rico and developing an interest in poetry as he served the role at Manatí. Alegría's maternal family also had a military background and owned a sugar plantation named Hacienda Grande at Loíza and was also involved in politics, with her brother Luis Hernáiz Veronne serving as mayor of Canóvanas. His grandmother, Estefanía Veronne, would leave the Hacienda to his mother and uncle.

By June 1923 he was baptized as a Roman Catholic. After a schism occurred within the Union Party as a consequence of independence being rejected by the organization while led by Antonio Rafael Barceló, José S. Alegría left and created the Asociación Independentista from where he served as one of the founding members of the Puerto Rican Nationalist Party in 1922, being given the office of president during a brief period. In 1932, the elder Alegría would join the Liberal Party and in 1936 was elected to the House of Representatives.

=== Interest in the arts and sciences ===
After hurricane San Felipe struck the island on 1928, his maternal family took refuge at their house along some of their employees. One of them, Luisa's aunt Elisita Gallardo, would remain with them afterwards and take care of the children. The house allowed the young Alegría the opportunity to oversee what happened at one of the most active segments of Old San Juan (such as the Casino de Puerto Rico) from a vantage point, and its centric location provided him the opportunity to become immersed on the daily activities such as the funeral processions or no the cultural events that took place at the Teatro Municipal (later renamed Teatro Tapia, after Alejandro Tapia y Rivera). The remnants of the colonial Spanish forts also littered its surroundings. The building also provided a private library that belonged to his father, which became his favorite spot. Being younger than his siblings, he was usually on his own and grew introverted around them. Despite this, he was mischievous on his daily life and would play pranks at the adjacent Plaza Colón and messing with the signals that forced the traffic to stop and allow the trolley to pass, earning him the chastising of local officers. Along his friends, Alegría was also part of a juvenile competition against the boys from Puerto de Tierra.

Growing up in a cultural epicenter, he would become involved in a number of ways, such as his participation in the performances that took part during the 1928 carnival, depicting a miner in the event dedicated to gemstones. The influence of his father, who had also become involved with the Puerto Rican academies of language and history, further fueled his interest in these fields. During his youth, Alegría directly witnessed the bohemian years of Luis Muñoz Marín, who lived in the adjacent San Cristóbal Apartments. As his parents took him often to a cinema, Cine Luna, he developed a hobby and would visit similar establishments throughout San Juan during the years that followed. A parallel interest in the theater of the Caribbean, dance acts and the performances of artists (Myrta Silva being among his favorites) was also born from variety shows held at some of these locales, such as Cine Rialto.

Elisita would share stories about the Hacienda, Loíza's folklore and her hobby of reading novels with him, but Alegría earned interest in works like Eugène Sue's The Wandering Jew and the 20-tome encyclopedia El tesoro de la juventud. It was the latter that first awoke an interest in archeology and motivated him to research the then-lost cities of Saguntum and Numantia, dreaming that one day he would discover their ruins. Noticing this interest, his father used his office as a legislator to write a letter to the Smithsonian Institution, requesting them to send books about their archeological research. Inspired by the stories about Hacienda Grande, Alegría developed an interest in Taínos, and after receiving a native ax that his maternal grandmother used as an iron, he began collecting native artifacts at the hacienda, which were the. placed in an impromptu museum at the shelfs found at the family's library. Pieces from abroad, such one acquired by one of his brothers at the Dominican Republic, were also added. He also began recording the stories that Elisita told him, creating his first compendium of local folklore. Alegría also developed other interests, such as collecting coins and stamps.

In 1931, Alegría met Pedro Albizu Campos at his father's law office at González Padín Plaza. The politician would also visit the family's house, something that others such as fellow politician Felisa Rincón de Gautier, educator Antonio S. Pedreira, historian Lidio Cruz Monclova and physician Rafael López Sicardó would do as well. In 1935, his father became the president of the luxurious Casino de Puerto Rico and introduced arts to the social center, this office also granted him the obligation of organizing carnivals. As consequence, their house would welcome a number of preliminary elements that would be used. His father exhibited an interest in architectural preservation, legislating a fund to restore Teatro Tapia and defending an old chapel named Capilla del Cristo and the Teatro Municipal when their demolition were proposed, leaving a lasting impression on Alegría.

A place known as La Barrandilla would become his social spot as he aged.

=== Schooling ===
Alegría began his primary education at the adjacent José Julián Acosta School in 1928, studying there under Mrs. Consuelo Martínez, Mrs. Cintrón, Mrs. Balaguer and Mrs. Gloria Soldevila. There he took part in the Americanization program being promoted by the colonial administration, being taught in English to his amusement, since he (and other students) fooled the Anglo teachers by adopting comical names. However, the young Alegría resented this and boycotted the pledge of allegiance by not raising his hand, which resulted in him being sent home on a number of times. On another such occasion when children were told to dress as American Founding Fathers and he was warned that no-participation would mean expulsion, Alegría adopted a costume of Patrick Henry as a double entenderé and used the latter's infamous declaration as a way to antagonize the school and promoting Puerto Rican independence at the same time. His father supported this, boycotting the Fourth of July, and generally provided his children with material from his personal library as a way to undo the influence of the Americanization initiative.

As part of the new format, Alegría would mingle with students of all classes and races, including his friends Laurence Snyder De la Vega, Gino Negretti and Ramón Olivera with whom he would socialize by riding velocipede, roller skating or attending plays. In 1933, Alegría was enrolled at Román Baldorioty De Castro School where he studied under Mrs. Peña, Miss Cuadrado and Mrs. Fulladora de Gutiérrez Franqui. Around this time he became interested in biology and began another small museum with animal specimens donated by fellow student Jorge Luis Laborde, and he would also dissect them. This captures his father's attention, and he purchased a microscope for Alegría. In 1935, Alegría began high school at Central High, where he studied under Mr. Kortright, Mrs. Justo, Mr. José Colón, Mr. Millán, Mr. Palacios and Mr. Rossy among others in subjects that ranged from traditional education to mechanical writing, carpentry and electrical setup to the standard topics. One teacher in particular, Inés María Mendoza, instructed him in local literature such as El Gíbaro, and promoted a pro-Puerto Rican stance that deviated from the institutional stance.

Despite his academic inclinations, his grades did not reflect this and in particular the English classes taught by Mr. Histand and Mrs. Mieles de Ayuso slipped. This was another reflection of his ideals, which he would manifest by joining a group that would lower the flag of the United States and replacing with the (then illegal) flag of Puerto Rico, afterwards rigging the pole so that the local flag could not be tampered with. Among his contemporaries were singer Sylvia Rexach, José Trías Monge and his future wife, Carmen Ana Pons. After his first year, Mendoza was fired by Education Commissioner José A. Gallardo for opposing the English instruction before the Hays Commission, awaking an interest in politics within him. He participated in a number of unsuccessful protests along José Tejada, which included writing a letter to the El Imparcial newspaper which led to a week-long suspension.

=== Higher education ===
After three years, Alegría graduated from Central High, but lacked four mandatory English classes and with a lackluster average, the university did not accept him. Instead, he was sent to the Instituto Politécnico in the municipality of San Germán, Puerto Rico. The sudden shift from a well-to-do environment to the rustic institution shocked Alegría, heavy Protestant preaching clashed with his own beliefs, while his lack of ability to do the manual labor required complicated his stay by inducing injuries. The pay was also subject to fines based on the evaluation of the living quarters, which led to little income. While Alegría was studying at the Politécnico, his family moved twice (living in a loaned house at Avenida De Diego until 1940) and eventually settled at Calle del Parque in Santurce, Puerto Rico. However, this led to several antique objects that he considered important as well as his pets, a monkey and a dog, being given away or disposed of. Alegría, who was never interested in the dances and parties that his siblings enjoyed, was given a room with a door that led outside and allowed him an easy exit.

Frustrated with the Politécnico, Alegría began rigging firecrackers for a delayed detonation and placed them in random places, which damaged the lighting system among other inconveniences. Despite making sure to be near a professor when they went off, eventually an investigation discovered him and director Jarvis S. Morris wrote to his father suggesting that he should return, citing that his conduct "[showed] a lack of respect." After only one semester, Alegría returned to San Juan. He and his friends Ignacio Cortés, José A. Benítez, Ramón Olivera, the Todd brothers, Fernando Martínez, Momón Pacheco and Ramón Negretti purchased a car for $16. He would join them in frequent rides to places like El Chévere, but not drive, participating in the middle-class culture of the zone. Alegría joined his father at Puerto Rico Ilustrado, where he worked along the likes of Julia de Burgos, Miguel Meléndez Muñoz, Benigno Fernández García, Rene Marqués and Manuel García Cabrera. After exchanging a depiction of the Coat of Arms of Puerto Rico made by film director Rafael Colorado for a file on the political life of Pedro Gerónimo Goyco, he published a piece (his first) about the physician.

During this time, Alegría took night classes, passing all classes with an "A" and met the standards that allowed him to enroll at the Universidad de Puerto Rico Río Piedras campus, joining the Arts and Sciences College to study history. Professors Lidio Cruz Monclova, Sebastián González García and Rafael W. Ramírez de Arellano influenced him, the latter two defined his interest in archeology and all of them contributed to his involvement with Puerto Rican historical and sociocultural topics. Ramírez de Arellano was responsible for teaching Puerto Rican history and had created a small museum of native artifacts, the Museo Juan Ponce de León and had authored a number of pieces and two magazines, Fuentes Históricas sobre Puerto Rico and El mes histórico, fueling in Alegría not only the interest for archeology and history, but also Puerto Rican folklore. His attitudes towards the English classes continued as previously, and he ended passing with a low grade due to professor William Power becoming tired of trying to teach him. Alegría's interest led to him requesting additional material from Cornelius Osgood of the Peabody Museum of Natural History, who requested Irving Rouse to fulfill the request.

At the UPR, Alegría socialized with a number of individuals with cultural affinities such as the son of poet P.H. Hernández, Pirulo Hernández. He also joined the Nu Sigma Beta fraternity, reaching the rank of Vice President, but being expelled after protesting "blood purity" and classist requirements. Alegría joined several of his friends and created another fraternity, Alpha Beta Chi which used a Taíno petroglyph from Lares as icon to serve as a visual rejection of the ways of the other fraternities, which usually adopted sophisticated heraldry to represent themselves. Only the Eta Gamma Delta sorority socialized with them, while other groups stuck to the class and race standards and boycotted any activity involving them. Under his presidency, Alpha Beta Chi held conferences and had their own publication. His protest against Nu Sigma Beta led to an investigation, which concluded which changed the dynamics between these groups and the university.

=== UPR Student Council ===
In 1940, Alegría materialized his view of the institution as a promoter of culture by joining Amaury Veray in the creation of the Círculo Musical Universitario, which was responsible for purchasing the first piano property of the university and creating a carnival, attracting the likes of Edna Coll and Héctor Campos-Parsi. The volatile ideological environment of the UPR saw him become involved in politics. He became a founding member and secretary of the Student Council (1941–42), helping revive the idea after his friend Luis Muñoz Lee III declined the rector's suggestion to organize it. Prior to this, Alegría had collaborated with Muñoz-Lee III during the early stages of the then-independentist friendly Partido Popular Democrático. Both also worked together publishing the Caribe magazine in 1941–42, which gathered a number of prominent collaborators within academia, the arts and politics. The publication subsisted on advertisers and allowed Alegría a tribune to not only promote his interests in culture, the arts and history, but to weigh in on the purpose of the UPR as a preserver of the work of local authors/historical documents and an institution that researched and promoted culture.

During the Tugwell affair, he supported keeping Rexford Tugwell as the head of the UPR despite also serving as colonial governor (due to considering him a "radical academic") and as secretary of the Student Council tried to convince Muñoz Marín not to visit the UPR to avoid becoming political bait, but failed, resulting in the public jeering of the then-President of the Senate of Puerto Rico and the removal of the functionary. Afterwards, Alegría campaigned for Jaime Benítez to become the new president, having previously studied under him and receiving his help while publishing the magazine. After World War II began, he argued in a Caribe editorial that the outcome would most likely lead to a political transformation in Puerto Rico. In the last of these, Alegría urged for the creation of a "Center for Puerto Rican studies", citing that the colonial administration had led to a disregard of "anything that belongs to us" and that only by teaching it at an equal rate to the foreign works being taught would it be truly appropriated. He did, however, warn that this did not mean adopting isolationism.

In 1943, Alegría served as an alternate student representative during the first Pro-Independence Congress. While trying to be re-elected to the council, he promoted the expansion of cultural initiatives, something that he had done in his Caribe editorials. At the UPR, Alegría was also involved in a number of entrepreneurial initiatives, running errands, creating a photo hut along Muñoz-Lee III so that students could have an identification and translating the script of operas held at the campus. He and Muñoz-Lee III also considered building a hotel at Isla Verde with a loan from Fomento (the public entity responsible for the economic growth), but desisted after Teodoro Moscoso argued that the area's environment was not ideal for tourism. The two, along George Bothwell, José Benítez, Gino Negretti and Walter Bothwell, would hold amateur archeological digs at places like El Yunque, Loíza and Boca Cangrejos. News from these events were published in a university paper.

=== Studies in archeology ===
Despite not earning a bachelor's degree due not completing the required foreign language classes, Alegría decided that he would start studies in archeology, which would make him the first local to take the discipline professionally. (Note: Puerto Rican amateur archeologists were recorded since the 19th Century, from which several native collections had emerged. One such example being José M. Nazario and his eponymous Nazario Collection. Prominent figures such as Agustín Stahl, Cayetano Coll y Toste and Adolfo de Hostos were also involved in the collection of artifacts. The first public exhibition of local collections took place as far back as 1854, exhibiting those property of José Julián Acosta and Jorge Látimer. Attempts to create a local museum date as far back as 1829 and 1865.) He considered traveling abroad and in 1942 left for The University of Chicago. Following an hydroplane flight to Miami, Alegría took a train the rest of the way.

Upon arriving, the dean of Social Sciences Robert Redfield told Alegría that he had been rejected and questioned how exactly he expected to study a master's degree without any previous education on the subject, but ultimately relented and approved a "test admission". He would take anthology classes under Fay-Cooper Cole, Sol Tax, Wilton M. Krogman, John Victor Murra and the dean himself. His first term paper was not adequate per the standards of Redfield, which taught him the importance of selecting adequate bibliography. Due to his insistence, Cole referred him to Richard S. MacNeish so that he could complete field research at a Faulkner archeological site. The archeologist accepted, expecting the young Alegría to give up quickly and the more experienced members to continue. However, on the fourth day he unearthed his first artifacts and requested MacNeish the recording of notes.

After this, Alegría learned how to employ the other tools and mastered the other aspects quickly, impressing both the head archeologist and his wife, June Helm. While working at an archeological site at Kentucky, he recorded the discrimination against African Americans in that state. Other field studies included a stay with the Ho-Chunk of Black River Falls under Thomas Sebeok, in which he was joined by several Puerto Ricans and received the native name of Kipiesquega. Alegría wrote about this experience for Puerto Rico Illustrado.

Alegría participated in Robert Hutchins' Committee on Social Thought, and attended Melville Herskovits' conferences on African-American studies. With the latter, he discussed the municipality of Loíza, Puerto Rico and the African influence in the Fiestas De Santiago Apóstol.

Arriving to Chicago during the height of World War II, he was also forced to report to the Army and was expecting to be drafted. The UPR's Humanities dean Sebastián González García intervened in his favor, arguing that he was the only current candidate that could reach the goal of completing studies in archeology and Benítez argued that he was "essential to national interests in his capacity as a civilian". Alegría settled in at the International House, along several Puerto Ricans including Muna Muñoz Lee, sister of his friend. He extended Alpha Beta Chi to the university, with the chapter adopting a rule that no nationality could comprise more than 25% of the membership.

He decided to rent his own apartment, but was constantly turned away by tenants that mistook him for Mexican. When Alegría finally found one, it was a basement. From there, he lived an admittedly "bohemian" phase and depended on his family to meet ends when the work that he found was insufficient. Besides Latinos, Alegría would record discrimination against Jews and blacks. Eventually, he polished his English by listening to the radio. At the 1944 Democratic National Convention Franklin D. Roosevelt launched his candidacy for a fourth term. Alegría requested a press pass from his father at Puerto Rico Ilustrado and knowing that the party's branch there was still small and isolated, impersonated its president. He used this to advocate for Puerto Rican independence and hold a conversation with candidate Henry A. Wallace. Alegría was politically involved, collaborating with the black community and hosting conferences.

While completing a thesis of Caribbean caciques (tribal chiefs) titled Cacicazgo among the Aborigines of the West Indies, he was mentored by Redfield and with collaboration by Tax. Parallel to this, Paul Martin of the Field Museum of Natural History created a curriculum for Alegría that included courses with him, George Irving Joint Au Quimby and John Collier for which he received a degree in museology. He forwarded these contacts to his former professors at Puerto Rico. He requested to fill an assistant professor vacancy at the University of Chicago, but the recommendation letter of Jaime Benítez was critical of his early college years.

== Career ==
=== Professor ===
During the 1945-46 year, the UPR named him professor in their Department of History and auxiliary director of the Museum of History, Anthropology and Arts. Shortly afterwards, he embarked on a trip throughout several American museums in search of Puerto Rican artifacts, which he catalogued and also created a bibliography of Antillean native studies. The Chicago Museum of Natural History, Oriental Institute of Chicago, the Walker Museum of Paleontology, the Art Institute of Chicago, the Historical Society of Chicago, the Museum of Science and Industry, the Logan Museum of Anthropology, the Academy of Sciences, the Metropolitan Museum and the Museum of Modern Art were among his stops. Making a stop at Yale University, he met Irving Rouse personally. Alegría mediated donations and loans for the UPR museum from the Smithsonian Institution and the Oriental Institute. During a trip to New York, he encountered Pons Caatañer while visiting historian Antonio Gautier.

On May 15, 1946, Alegría noted that his family was growing impatient with his absence. Shortly afterwards, he returned to Puerto Rico and reunited with both Pons Castañer and Luis Muñoz-Lee III. At the UPR, Alegría began teaching three history courses. He also participated in the Extramuros initiative. Alegría sold his first documentary, Las Fiestas De Santiago Apóstol en Loíza Aldea to the Puerto Rico Department of Tourism.

Alegría, along other professors, worked on educating teachers during the weekends. These teachers introduced him to people that practiced Talla de Santos and he began collecting their sculptures, commissioning the entire life of Jesus from Florencio Cabán. Alegría was also involved with the UPR's museum as auxiliary director and was in charge of anthropology, at the institution -which born from Ramírez de Arellano's collection- Pons Castañer aided him while preparing the exhibitions, some of which featured his own findings. His intention from the beginning was to prove the existence of a long-standing Puerto Rican cultural tradition that began in prehistoric times, emphasizing everything up to the 19th ventury.

He also promoted active investigations, promotions, exchanges and other activities intending to create public consciousness and prevent the exportation of local collections. The collections of Gildo Massó, Benigno Fernández García, José Limón de Arce, Adolfo de Hostos and J.L. Montalvo Guenard were donated to the museum, as were civilian findings. Foreign museums also provided materials and on occasion loaned exhibits, allowing for an expansion that included among others the Oriental, Egyptian, Neolithic and African art exhibits. Alegría officially graduated on March 21, 1947, the sole student to achieve an anthropology master's that year. At the 1947 Instituto Panamericano de Geografía e Historia congress, Alegría coincided with Arturo Morales Carrión and met Alfredo Metraux, who would later send him books. Alegría would write a book on the Fiestas De Santiago Apóstol.

=== Archeology excavations ===
Between 1947 and 1948, Alegría created the Proyecto de Excavaciones Arqueológicas (later Centro de Investigaciones Arqueológicas y Etnográficas) in collaboration with the UPR. He held excavations at La Monserrat's at Luquillo, where he excavated the piece known as "Venus de Luquillo" and several remains. His interests were also growing and he planned an extended stay with the natives at Guyana, which had similarities with the local groups. Alegría's work there allowed the separation of the Igneri and Taíno subgroups of the Arawak classification. Cueva del Indio and several caves found at Hacienda San José were also prodded in 1948. Alegría organized archeological incursions at Luquillo, Loíza and Utuado.

His early work attracted mixed reactions, it was well received in times where exploration was unveiling lost settlement, but also skepticism from the uneducated, parodies (one, "Lalo en Brodwey" labeled them "luquillólogos" and another by Diplo) and distrust from the neighboring communities. Superstition about the ghost of a cacique haunting their excavation was also published. Amateur archeologists used the opportunity to boast about their collections. Ultimately, Alegría decided to recruit the neighbors and offered rewards for performance. His wife, family and friends also participated under his supervision. Afterwards, Alegría led excavations at Cueva de María la Cruz at Loíza, where he uncovered the first evidence of arcaico group in the form of bodies and artifacts. In the nearby Hacienda Grande, they uncovered an igneri or salanoide deposit, the oldest Arawak finding yet. His findings also discredited Irving Rouse's theory that cross-hatch lines in ceramics were an intrusion in Puerto Rico. By this time, he had collaborated in a legislation draft that would allow the construction of a museum. By 1949, an archeological map had been elaborated and 2,782 pieces catalogued.

He also promoted reintroducing or popularizing local cultural customs by giving them space in the exhibits at the museum. Talla de Santos was one of these and Alegría worked on a biopic about Zoilo Cajigas Sotomayor titled Santero, which was completed with the help of DIVEDCO and exhibited at the artist's native municipality of Aguada. Painters such as Francisco Oller and prominent local politicians would also be featured. Alegría's own work would serve to expand the Puerto Rican Archeology section. External exhibitions were held throughout Puerto Rico, most notably in schools. Alegría also researched African influence on local culture. On January 7, 1949, Ricardo Jr. was born to the couple. During this year, he succeeded Ramírez de Arellano as director of the UPR's museum. He led Gordon Willey and Henry Nicholson to the María la Cruz deposits, with the findings being published in American Antiquity. The material was exhibited at the museum.

Alegría led an incursion that discovered monolith-hedged plazas and artifacts at the Caguana site, documented by Osiris Delgado. He concluded that one of the plazas (batey) was likely religious and others were used recreationally. In these, rock belts were unearthed that allowed establishing a correlation between the bateyes and these. Alegría tried, unsuccessfully, to adquiere the terrains. Consequently, he reburied the plazas to protect them from treasure hunters. His excursions were not limited to Puerto Rico, and he also worked at the Virgin Islands. Parallel to this, he directed the documentary Fiestas de Santiago Apóstol en Loíza Aldea, the first local documentary filmed in color which also equaled the saints being honored to the yorubas. The film, however, clashed with the elite that felt that it didn't represent Puerto Rico, something that Alegría had noticed even among some blacks at Loíza who would distance themselves from Africa and claim that they "came from Spain". This marked another example of his interest in the influence of African culture in Puerto Rico, which also included a collection of tales and the study of local witchcraft and cultural celebrations.

In 1949, Alegría was the UPR representative at the XXIX Congreso Internacional de Americanistas, where he discussed the etiology of the work "cacique". During this visit, he mediated funds for a new building for the UPR collection from the Rockefeller Foundation and the Viking Fund, which was combined with local legislation that legally formalized the institution of the Museum of History, Anthropology and Arts (until then operating without government interference) also assigning a sum two years later. Requests for more funds for the building were directed towards corporations such as Eastern Air Lines, with the structure being completed in 1959. In 1950, Alegría traveled to a Junta Nacional de Arqueología de Cuba, where the unification of archeological terms used in the Caribbean was discussed. That year he excavated the Canas site at Ponce, where he documented the difference in the diets of Salanoides and Taínos. He also won a Mundo Hispánico contest with an article about the influence of African culture in the Caribbean.

In April 1952, Benítez did not grant Alegría the permission to attend the 5th Congreso de Historia Municipal, for which he had been invited. Instead, he would serve as host for John Alden Mason during a visit to Puerto Rico, something that would create a long-term collaboration between both. In 1952, Alegría joined other es in founding the Mesa Arqueológica subscribed to the AIAC. While his work was gaining prominence, the reception of some of the academic community was cynical about his subject of interest being the local natives, while the popular culture was full of speculation about his intentions. Other áreas of research, such as African influence in Puerto Rican culture, had also been mocked when they first entered the mainstream. Other excavations were held at Arecibo and the adjacent islands of Vieques and Mona.

=== PhD research ===
In 1952, Alegría received the Guggenheim grant (endorsed by Herbert J. Krieger of the Smithsonian) and left to study a PhD in anthropology. Initially interested in studying Mesoamerican culture he requested to be sent to Central America, but instead was offered to divide the year between his request and the United States. Instead, he choose Harvard University. There he took classes under Earnest Hooton, Gordon Willey, Alfred M. Tozzer, Hallam Movius, Samuel Lothrop and Clyde Kluckhohn. During his stay he lived at a loaned house at Cambridge. His wife also studied, but left before Alegría graduated due to the children not enjoying the place. Alegría's thesis, Ball Courts and Ceremonial Plazas in the West Indies, was written with help from Willey and used his own discoveries at Puerto Rico as source. Yale would publish it afterwards.

While studying at Harvard, Alegría negotiated the donation of several Egyptian artifacts from the Peabody Museum (which also donated Haitian ceramics) to the UPR, including a mummy. During this time, Grupo Guamá donated Cuban artifacts, while Mel Fisher Maritime Heritage Museum and the Florida State University donated additional ceramics. He returned to Puerto Rico and resumed his functions as professor of the UPR. By now, Alegría was collaborating with anthropological publications with frequency and gathering a reputation as an expert.

Having learned how to identify skeletal remains from Krogman, in 1947 Alegría was recruited by prosecutor Ángel Viera Martínez to collaborate with an investigation surrounding the ethnic group of a skeleton that was found.

Alegría studied under Richard McNeish and Thomas Sebeok.

During the first years as executive director of the ICP, Marisa Rosado served as his secretary.

Among his alumni were archeologist Miguel Rodríguez and architect José García Gómez.

In 1954, Alegría used the reward from the Mundo Hispánico contest to fund the book Las Fiestas De Santiago Apóstol en Loíza. The work was mentioned by Fernando Ortiz in the Cuban magazine Bohemia, under the title "Los "diablitos" de Puerto Rico". The book, however, was a slow sell and he took it to the Literature Institute, where Epifanio Fernández Vanga mocked that his idea of culture was about the "little blacks from Loíza Aldea". During this year, Alegría publicly criticized one of Benítez's initiatives, which granted more money to the visiting professors than the locals. Alegría was a judge in the Ateneo's Talla de Santos Christmas contest. In 1955, Alegría published his findings at María la Cruz in a book. That same year, Peabody Museum donated a male mummy to the UPR, which he "bathed" and curated.

On March 1, 1955, Alegría held a reunion with the then-governor Muñoz Marín to discuss a law that would facilitate the acquisition of private collections such as Junghanns' Collections. Towards this goal, he compiled similar laws already in use abroad and presented them to José Trías Monge for use as reference to draft laws based on the eminent domain of the state over historical pieces.

At the behest of Benítez, Alegría participated in the public hearings about a government initiative that pushed for the creation of an "institute of culture" held in May 1955, where he argued in name of the UPR and insisted on the necessity of finishing the building of the museum.

=== Director of the ICP ===
On June 21, 1955, the law that created the Institute of Puerto Rican Culture (ICP) was passed as part of a larger cultural drive. Luis Manuel Díaz Soler, the UPR's Dean of Humanities, authored a report that was handed to governor Muñoz Marín which highlighted Alegría's archeological, folkloric and cultural work. The Secretary of Instruction held a reunion with him. There Alegría noted that he disliked the name, finding it too similar to the Instituto de Cultura Hispánica, and proposed "Comisión para la Cultura". His suggestions were not heeded, but he nonetheless was satisfied that Luis A. Ferré's "Instituto Puertorriqueño de Cultura" did not advance either. On October 10, 1955, José A. Buitrago proposed Alegría for the office of executive director of the ICP, winning a vote over Nilita Vientós Gastón, 5–1. Muñoz Marín hesitated due to his political stances, but ultimately allowed the appointment with the influence of Inés and Tomás Blanco.

On October 23, Alegría was assigned the task of creating a plan for the following year, which he presented a week later. His role was attacked by Eliseo Combas Guerra of El Mundo and was viewed with suspicion by the UPR, which not only lost his services, but also a dominance on cultural affairs. He formally took over on November 1, 1955, and he immediately adopted a pro-Puerto Rican agenda, setting his sight on the restoration of Old San Juan and acquiring the Caguanas site. Alegría distanced from the highly intellectual form of administration that was employed by the Ateneo. They defined "national culture" as the mixing of Taíno, African and Spanish elements and emphasized that folklore was a relevant field of study. Alegría was not satisfied with his salary, which he considered too onerous, so he redirected it by paying for activities. The ICP began working on the creation of a General Archive and the Institute of Literature, as well as the restoration of San Juan. The institution occupied the former Casino of Puerto Rico along the Escuela Libre de Música, afterwards acquiring the entire building.

Alegría defied the Gag Law (a local reinterpretation of the Smith Law) by bringing in nationalists Isabel Gutiérrez del Arroyo and Roberto Baescoechea, something that placed him at odds with the Subsecretary of Justice, Francisco Espinosa. Trías Monge, who was both the Secretary of Justice and a member of the ICP's board and the author of the Gag Law knew from the beginning that enacting it was a bad idea and the case created friction between him and the governor. Alegría acquired local paintings and engravings for the ICP and beginning in 1956 also held challenges as a way to promote the arts. Expositions were held locally (the ICP itself hosted a permanent hall) and abroad (from were materials were brought back in return, including the first exhibit of African art), in places such as the Riverside Museum or the Pan American Union.

The "La pintura puertorriqueña desde el siglo XVIII hasta nuestros días" exhibit, which featured Campeche (a recurrent motif) and Oller among others, toured Puerto Rico and popularized several local artists. Alegría emphasized the local art, which he perceives had been under appreciated, and in the process rediscovered several pieces. By 1963, the ICP could assemble an exhibit of 400 pieces from 40 different artists.

In 1961, Alegría attended the Congress for Cultural Freedom/Gokhale Institute of Economics and Politics Paths to Economic Growth seminary held at India. The budget for the institute was limited and the approval of anything new was subjected to the governor's approval. During its first years and up to 1957, new programs were being created on a monthly basis, including the creation of Commissions to oversee music, historic monuments, plastic arts, theater and publications. The General Archive, Folkloric Ballet and Choral Poetry programs were created. Antiquities were purchased, restored and exhibited.

Courses, in disciplines such as sculpture, engraving, knitting, mosaics, stained glass or metalwork, the first government-sponsored initiative in plastic arts to be long-lived, were held after the ICP expanded. Likewise, Alegría's long standing interest in Talla de Santos and local traditions led to the creation of the first widespread popular arts and handicrafts programs (popular arts led Initially by Lillianne Pérez Marchand -1957 to 1963- and later Walter Murray Chisea), rescuing several practices from approaching disappearance and reviving faltering traditions (such as folkloric music and the use of the cuatro, triple and the bordonúa). Expositions, exhibitions and fairs were held to popularize these. Regional folklore was also promoted. Alegría gathered pieces from all of these endeavors, which he later sold at an ICP/Fomento store at Sol street.

=== Restoration of Old San Juan ===
The restoration of San Juan would be complicated, facing apathy from the local merchants. However, both mayor Felisa Rincón and First Lady Inés Mendoza supported it. Alegría led the ICP in an alliance with Fomento, first restoring a sample of four buildings. Architects Eladio López Tirado and Franz Loesche were recruited and the process followed the recommendations made to the Junta de Planificación by restoration experts. Old blueprints and documents were extracted from the General Archive and the municipal archives, which the Historic Building Commission used to create the Proyecto para la conservación del San Juan Antiguo (which only covered Old San Juan) authored by Osiris Delgado who worked along the Junta de Planes. Casa del Callejón at Fortaleza street No. 319 was the first building restored by the ICP, after Alegría bought it from the previous owner, who initially wanted to demolish it. During the early stages, Alegría entered several others that had been damaged and made assessments and document features. On occasion, experts were brought in from abroad to attend particular issues.

Alegría pushed for the use of pastel colors, which he cited were the ones present in the blueprints and other contemporary drawings, but this created a controversy with the residents who favored bright colors. Despite this, Alegría tried to convince the residents to take part in the restoration (under the regulations and guidance of the ICP), showing them the documentation of other buildings, and a campaign was launched to repopulate Old San Juan. Alegría and his family moved from Hato Rey to the colonial city, purchasing houses at San José Street and moving to one in 1967. Tax and other exemptions, as well as loans from Fomento, were provided to facilitate this process. A repository of materials was also created, from which residents would purchase them at lower costs. Alegría also defied the bishop of the San Juan Cathedral, who wanted to demolish the Convento de las Carmelitas, by declaring the structure a historic building.

The same tactic was used when Bacardí tried to demolish a site at Puerta de Tierra, which had the distinction of being the oldest large scale colonial building built by the Spanish in the Americas. Ultimately, Alegría was able to acquire the building from Pepín Bosch for 500,000 (below its actual price), in a process that included the intervention of Muñoz Marín. With the support of the UNESCO's expert Manuel Fernández Huidobro, the building was restored to host the General Archive. The process, however, required Alegría to frequently ask for more funds from the governor. Incensed at the prohibition of neon signs, local merchants opposed the restoration of the colonial structures, arguing that what was needed was the creation of a modern city, of a "Little New York". They had some support from political candidates. Lawsuits were common. Alegría also pressured to acquire several of the historical forts from the United States military due to deteriorating under their custody, including El Morro and San Cristóbal, the Convento de los Dominicos and Casa Blanca.

During a visit from James William Fulbright, Alegría convinced him that the historic zone has no military value, allowing the beginning of this process. Alegría requested a license without pay to take over the ICP, but continued teaching two courses. His film Santero was exhibited at the 1956 Venetian Film Festival, the 1956 Edinburgh Film Festival and the 1956 Flaherty Foundation Seminar. The following year it was featured at the Panamerican Union, the Museum of Modern Art and the Latin American Music Festival. A project to promote local theater was launched by the ICP in 1958, for which Alegría received the help of Francisco Arriví of the eponymous Theater Commission. The local legislators assigned $20,000 for it and Puerto Rican Theater Festivals were held yearly.

Alegría was part of the Hispanic Society of America's 1958 class of recruits. In 1960, the ICP collaborated with the municipal Departamento de Obras Públicas in the restoration of Plaza San José. Alegría proposed a plan to create condominiums so that the population of San Juan would be more diverse, but only one of them was ever built and reassigned before it could serve its purpose.

In 1962, Alegría collaborated with Rouse to create a new timeline for the indigenous cultures of Puerto Rico. His classification was based on Arcaic, Arawak and Carib cultures, divided by phases. That same year, the restoration of La Fortaleza began. Alegría taught an undergraduate archeology class at the Pontificia Universidad Católica de Puerto Rico (PUCPR), where an exhibit was created. An Office of Archeological Investigations was established, in which his son José Francisco was involved. The ICP's restoration of the historic zone of Ponce (recognized as such in 1962) was more controversial than that of San Juan, particularly from the commercial interests, and the bands were divided between the pro-restoration Commission on Monument Advice and the anti-restoration Industrial Committee (led by mayor Eduardo Ruberté). The extent of the issues convinced Alegría to contact Muñoz Marín and Mendoza, in an attempt to have locals and politicians warm up to the idea. That same year, the governor passed an ICP initiative to begin a program to liven up public buildings with art.

In 1965, Alegría had been involved in an attempt by Muñoz Marín to materialize a center of advanced studies with the collaboration of nuclear physicist Robert Oppenheimer, which was aborted when the latter died. In 1976, Alegría revived the initiative by recalling it from the CES and focusing on a spinoff based on Puerto Rican and Caribbean studies, also advising a committee (Ramón Cruz, Rafael Arrillaga Torrén and Aurelio Tió) that was placed in charge of naming a board. The mission also advocated for the autonomy of the institution and the capacity to grant university degrees (initially a master's degree in Arts specialized in Puerto Rican/Caribbean studies). The board of the new entity, presided by Morales Carrión (also composed by Concha Meléndez, Rafael Ríos Rey, Fernando Chardón, Luis M. Rodríguez Morales, Enrique Laguerre, Francisco López Cruz, Luis Torres Oliver, Milton Rúa and Aurelio Tió), named Alegría the executive director. The ICP gave $11,500 to the CEAPRC for the students of the Estudios Puertorriqueños program, while the CES $50,000. The UPR provided professors. At Casa Blanca, Alegría founded the physical locale of the Centro de Estudios Avanzados, taking the Estudios Puertorriqueños in a new direction. An initiative then began to expand the roll, reaching 118 students by 1979.

In 1966, Alegría established the School of Plastic Arts, first established in a former warehouse.

=== The "Cultural Wars" ===
Alegría traveled to the Dominican Republic along Luis Chanlatte Bank in an archeological initiative to compare ceramics from there to those found at Puerto Rico. In 1967, he drafted legislation for a large theater to be created at Santurce and placed in charge of the ICP, the Centro de Bellas Artes, at the behest of Francisco Arriví. Roberto Sánchez Vilella vetoed the project. Another similar project emerged the following year, but the long-standing rivalry with Moscoso reemerged over the location and administration and languished. When Alegría was invited to participate in an activity that would set the stage for the activities surrounding the 450th anniversary of San Juan, he pressured Ferré on the matter. The measure was signed on June 19, 1970, granting the ICP funds to prepare studies and draft blueprints. The construction of the Centro de Bella's Artes extended throughout two administrations, facing cuts due to the petroleum crisis.

On May 12, 1980, Carlos Romero Barceló passed the "culture laws" which removed the CBA and other initiatives under the control of the ICP, creating autonomous public corporations that were under the newly created Administración para el Fomento de las Artes y la Cultura (formally created on May 30). In 1967, his Talla de Santos collection depicting the life of Jesus was exhibited at the ICP, to which they were later donated as a "permanent loan". On March 27, 1969, the Committee of Budget and Personnel of the UPR's History Department proposed ascending Alegría to the Rank of cathedratic. On January 16, 1970, the ICP relocated to the restored Dominican Convent. That year, Alegría also held the first Bienal del Grabado Latinoamericano, for which he contacted local and foreign experts to serve as advisors and judges, which was used to mark the debut of the new building. The event would continue being held on a regular basis afterwards.

The Puerto Rican Studies program was born to connect the ICP with the diaspora, and was initially worked in collaboration with the New York State University after the UPR declined, preparing locals that intended to relocate and providing resources to professors and teachers that worked with Puerto Rican children that were abroad. The initiative later expanded to include a master's degree, after Alegría lobbied for the legislature to grant the institute the ability to offer degrees (and from which the Plastic Arts School also benefited). Ethel Ríos de Betancourt of the Middle States Association opposed the recognition, but Alegría received support from the president of the Higher Education Council Ramón Mellado Parsons. Differences between the university and the ICP led to the latter taking over it. Alegría continued teaching at the UPR, which included archeological work at Loíza, doing so free of charge due to his license. On July 1, 1971, he was formally recognized as a cathedratic.

In 1972, Alegría declined an offer from Buffalo University to participate in an American Studies class for a year.

In 1973, the "Imagen de Pedro Albizu Campos" exhibit was organized by the ICP, which he considered historic. During this year he also collaborated with "The Art of Puerto Rico: Pre-Columbian to the Present" which was featured at the Metropolitan Museum of Art and El Museo del Barrio. The ICP performed an island-wide cultural inventory that included both the material and the folkloric.

In October 1972 and following the restoration of Casa de Ponce de León in the Dominican Republic, the provinces of Higüey and San Rafael de Yuma declared him an "Servidor Eminente del Patrimonio Cultural". Alegría worked on the restoration of the Iglesia San José and the Seminario Concilar de San Idelfonso. He moved the CEA to the latter. Along Arturo Morales Carrión he was a founding member of the Fundación Puertorriqueña de las Humanidades.

=== Cultural and political activism ===
Afterwards, Alegría left the ICP and created a committee that pushed for the preservation of the restoration work. The Puerto Rican Studies initiative was then taken over by José Ramón de la Torre, but it experienced a sharp decline. Alegría would continue restoring buildings such as Iglesia San José, Seminario Conciliar and Cuartel de Ballajá. Alegría tried to negotiate with governor Ferré the acquisition of the Giorgetti house, which was set for demolition, but the attempt was unsuccessful. The Office of Cultural Affairs was created for him by the governor, and he took the office of director for three years first creating the "Recomendaciones para promover el estudio y aprecio de la cultura puertorriqueña y los esfuerzos que realizan las agencias de gobierno". These were based on attending what he perceived were the shortcomings of "colonial minded education" and included coordinating all government-sponsored cultural activities, creating the office of Coordinator of Cultural Affairs (given the same authority as a cabinet member) to oversee an interagency umbrella that covered the ICP, Fomento Instruction, Parks and Recreation and the UPR among other.

The Office of Cultural Affairs was officially created on November 19, 1973, and the Escuela Libre de Música program as well as Festival Casals were added. Alegría was formally named less than a month later. He avoided duplicity with most of the functions of the ICP, but remained focused on the Puerto Rican Studies program and even proposed creating a Casa de Puerto Rico program at New York and Chicago and libraries of Puerto Rican literature abroad. He made a push for the UPR to become involved with the initiative. Instruction was tasked with educating its teachers in cultural and historic affairs. Parks and Recreations were tasked with the Parque de las Américas, a project that dated back to the Muñoz Marín administration and which Alegría had defended over a Spanish-funded amusement park.

In April 1974, Alegría participated in an excursion to the Orinoco River along José Cruxent and Manuel García Arévalo. Interested in learning more of the origin of the Arawaks, he spent some time with the piaroas and the guahibos. Alegría observed several practices that he was able to also identify in the groups of Puerto Rico and brought several pieces that were donated to the ICP for the Museo del Indio.

In October 1974, Alegría was appointed to the Commission on Education Reform, drafting a plan to identify troubled children and place them in "residential schools" (houses in charge of custodians, intending to distance them from an environment that promoted crime) where they would receive both a high-level education and work training, being allowed the option to continue their education at the age of 18. The project failed in the legislature, where it faced opposition from hesitant social workers and welfare recipients. Further controversy emerged around the Parque de las Américas in 1975, when Luis Vigoreaux/Fomento Recreativo proposed a different project in the premises, known as Parque Popular which featured the return involvement of the Spaniards. Alegría opposed it and Muñoz Marín did as well, with the project falling short after public hearings, but several members of the PPD took his opposition negatively. He attempted to have the park of El Morro ready by February 1976, but his communication with the governor had dwindled.

After another of his projects -a boardwalk in the San Juan port area- fell short due to lack of funding that he considered arbitrary, Alegría and filed his resignation. However, when Barceló entered the conflict over the Parque de las Américas he decided to remain in the office. On November 8, 1976, shortly after the PNP won the election, Alegría retired feeling that the office had been a failure and calling it "[his] Waterloo". Alegría also wanted to write about several pieces that he had gathered. He continued collaborating with restoration efforts at Antigua, Guatemala; La Guaira and Caracas. At Peru he was invited to participate in the restoration of Lima, although his stay was cut short due to Sendero Luminoso.

He also offered conferences at Peru (on the restoration of Kuzco) and Columbia University at New York (about colonial architecture and its restoration). Alegría also intervened to prevent the demolition of a synagogue at Santurce.

His work in the plastic arts featured collaboration from a commission and particular artists such as Francisco Vázquez and Carlos Marichal, leading to the creation of the Escuela de Artes Plásticas y Diseño de Puerto Rico. Exhibits were promoted, art was popularized and learning was emphasized, with artists being send abroad to learn. However, what he felt were the "unfair critics" to a board that was named under his administration and the arbitrary critic of the work done during the past decade (including his 1970-73 tenure) made him decline further involvement.

In 1983, Alegría was invited to the Museo Arqueológico de Madrid where the pre-Columbian cultures of the Americas were discussed. Alegría was also designated to the Comisión Puertorriqueña para la Celebración de los Quinientos Años del Descubrimiento de América y de Puerto Rico. This commemoration led to the proposal of the Museo de las Américas, which intended to document the entire history of the hemisphere.

Alegría considered statehood "the destruction of [Puerto Rican] nationality from a cultural standpoint" or "cultural suicide" and traveled to Latin America seeking support, arguing that if statehood was granted nothing would prevent the United States from invading and assimilating any country in the region.

On Octubre 4, 1990, Alegría proposed the restoration of Río Piedras, which he expected to mimic that of Old San Juan and actively involve the UPR.

On January 5, 1996, Jeffrey Farrow responded to his 1993 letter suggesting that the status of Puerto Rico was of interest to the president. On May 6, 1996, Clinton himself wrote expressing the same.

In April 1996, the Smithsonian commemorated his birthday in an event. He was featured in the Living Portraits series as part of this event.

After Pedro Rosselló expressed that he did not believe in the existence of a Puerto Rican nation in 1996, Alegría collaborated with Noel Colón Martínez and Antonio Fas Alazamora in a march known as La Nación en Marcha. That year, he also attended the inauguration of a monument honoring Ramón Emeterio Betances at Havana.

During the 1990s, Alegría adviced Producciones Vejigante, a non-profit cinema studio, with which he revisited the Fiestas de Santiago Apóstol. In 1999, Alegría proposed the construction of a mega port, citing that it would damage Old San Juan and only benefit foreign investors. When Sila Calderón won the 2000 general elections, he drafted a cultural plan. Itvwas spearheaded by the restitution of Spanish as the sole official language, publishing a book detailing Puerto Rico prior to the Spanish-American War and another about the changes that took place during the 1940s, tax exemptions to authors, editors, painters and artists, a center that helped distribute Puerto Rican literature and additional funds for the CEAPRC and the ICP and a commission to identify and protect socio-cultural/artistic heritage. At the turn of the millennium, Alegría collaborated with Eusebio Leal in the restoration of Havana.

== Awards and recognition ==
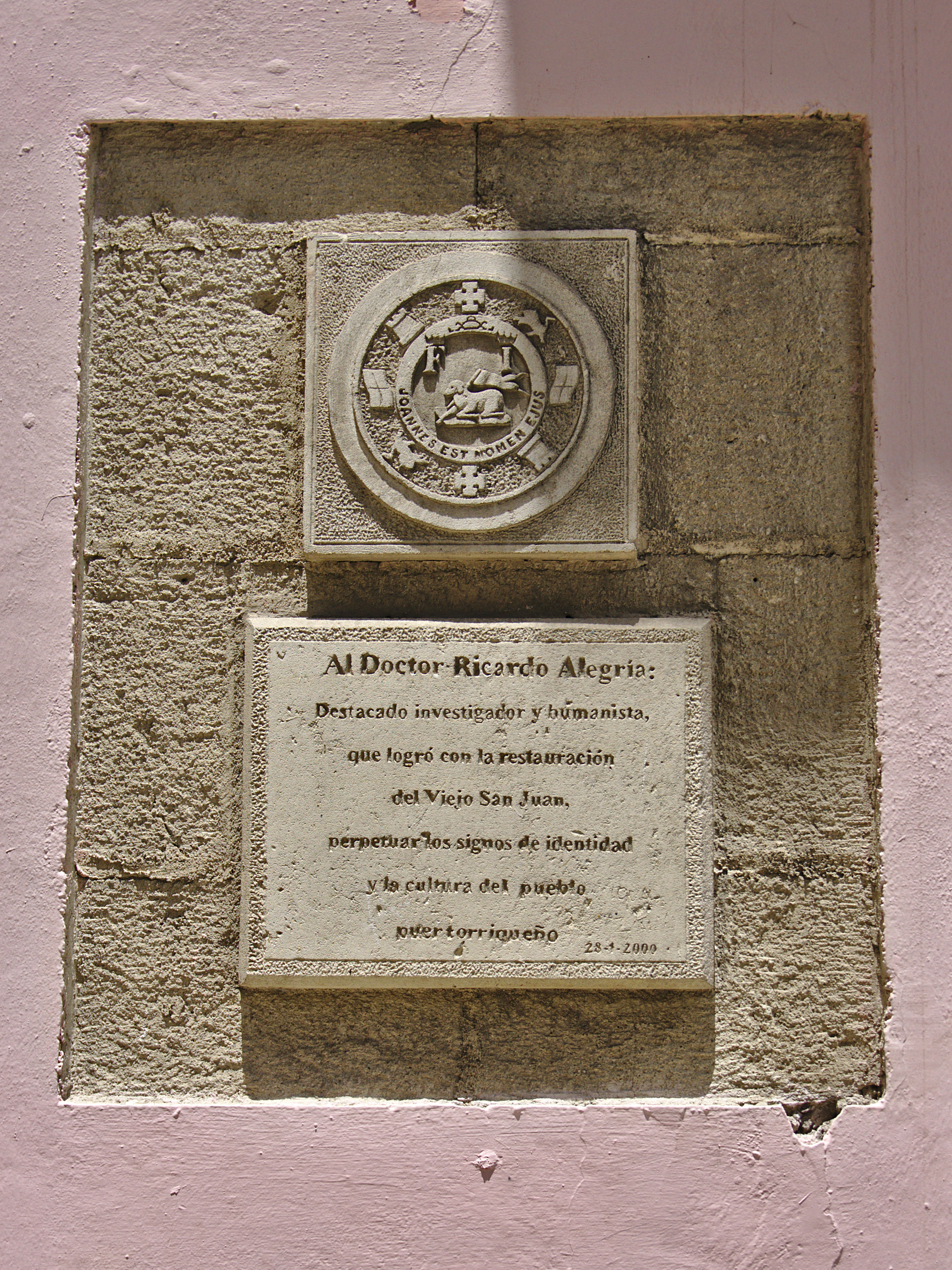
Plaque in Havana, Cuba honoring Alegría

In 1993, President Bill Clinton presented Alegría with the Charles Frankel Prize of the National Endowment for the Humanities for contributions to the field of archaeology. Alegría received the James Smithson Bicentennial Medal in 1996. Alegría received The Haydee Santamaria Medal in 2001. In 2002, the Puerto Rican Governor Sila Calderón presented the Luis Muñoz Marín Medal to Alegría in recognition of his life achievements.

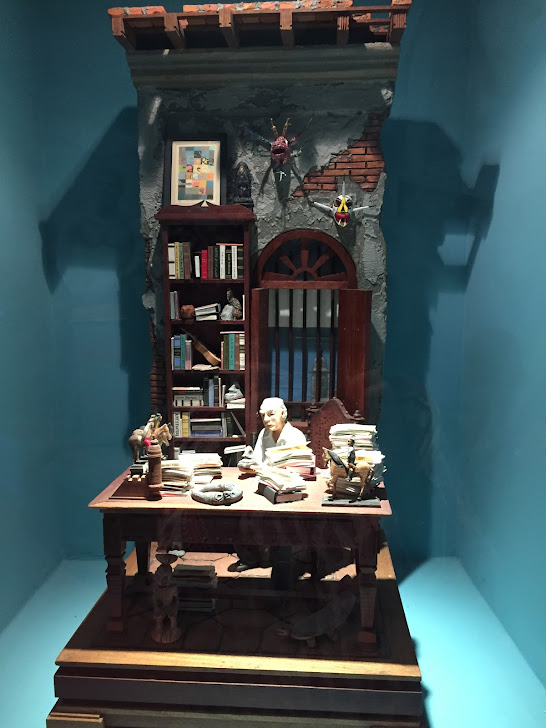
"Dr. Ricardo E. Alegría Gallardo -Retablo" by Edwin Báez Carrasquillo in the Museo de las Américas

Alegría received recognition and honorary degrees from cultural and architectural organizations in Peru, Venezuela, Mexico, and the Dominican Republic. The city of Havana recognized his influence in the project to remodel the city's historical district (similar to Alegría's work in Old San Juan) by honoring him with a plaque, placed in front of the basilica de San Francisco de Asis in Old Havana, Cuba.

Puerto Rican folk duo Los Niños Estelares dedicated a tribute song to Alegría, named "Alegría, Doctor Alegría", on their 2010 album, Namasté. In it they describe many of Alegría's accomplishments, his educational background, and -partly in jest, due to Alegría's impressive credentials- likened him to Indiana Jones. In the lyrics, they name Alegría "the last Puerto Rican hero."

In 2011, the Museo de las Américas hosted a special exhibit, "Richard Alegría: An Intimate Look", featuring photographs by Chendo Pérez. In 2021, the museum and filmmaker Amalia García Padilla released the documentary 500 and 100: Ricardo Alegría on the Isleta de San Juan, commemorating the 500th anniversary of San Juan with narration by Alegría.

Puerto Rican artist Lorenzo Homar honored Alegría in an artistic graphic poster. Nobel laureate Mario Vargas Llosa was inspired by Alegría and included a fictional character based on him, named Ricardo Santurce, in the play El loco de los balcones.

== Personal life ==
Alegría never learned to swim, dance or drive, a reflection of a monk-like life of study. On his vacations, he usually collected pieces and became acquainted with the folklore and artisans of whatever place he found himself in.

He owned six pigs named Guasábara, Huracán, Agüeybaná, Yayael, Atabey and Caona. After his father died in 1965, his mother moved in with them. Alegría suggested the name for the University of Turabo, where he later helped establish an Etnographic Museum and a Center of Humanistic Studies, as well as digs at Cagüitas and Punta Candelero.

=== Marriage and family ===
In 1947, Alegría married Pons Castañer and moved away from the family house, relocating at No. 405 Floral Park. That same year, he and his siblings purchased their parents' house. On October 15, 1951, the couple had their second son, José Francisco. Years later, children would visit his father's excavations and he would pay them. Alegría was afraid of snakes, a situation that he learned to deal with as they emerged during excavations. In his house, Alegría built a library similar to the one in his childhood house and incorporated the remnants of that original collection, decorating it with a Carlos Marichal painting of his father as an homage. In 1977, his mother died. Alegría lived with Pons in the second floor of the couple's Old San Juan house well into old age. His eponymous son and his family inhabited the first floor. Alegría lived surrounded by ongoing projects, investigations and books that were in the process of being completed, littering the house with binders. In 1993, his son José Francisco died.

=== Political and philosophical beliefs ===
Alegría is the subject of a carpeta numbered 27579, with 1980 being the year with most compiled entries. He also made appearances before the Decolonization Committee as the leader of the Consejo Nacional de Instituciones Culturales and was involved to include the topic in the XXXVII general assembly. Despite "loaning his vote to halt statehood", Alegría never joined the PPD, later recognizing that in doing so he probably limited his opportunities at securing a public office, given his close ties to the Muñoz family (Muñoz Marín himself called him a "nationalist angel") and noting that the former governor had tried to convince him to run for the Senate and that Mendoza wanted him to consider a run for governor. Despite not being affiliated to the party, he urged against affiliating the local branch of the Democratic Party to the PPD and later against adopting a pro-American strategy as the PNP emerged in 1968.

On occasion, he publicly clashed with Muñoz on issues such as attending the funeral of Albizu Campos or while defiantly proposing renouncing the United States citizenship prior to the 1967 status referendum, for which he preferred making it a yes/no vote on the topic of statehood. He anticipated the raise of Ferré among statehooders and noted that the Commonwealth campaign had been weak and succumbed to the "fear campaign" promoted against a "sovereign association", something that he felt should instead be emphasized to counteract a growing statehood movement. His postures earned him enemies within the PPD, such as Raúl Gándara, who used them to label him a "nationalist" in an age where the label was most associated with the 1950 uprising. When Muñoz Marín considered pursuing the presidential vote for the residents of the Commonwealth, Alegría gathered several opposers and wrote to him. Afterwards, the governor abandoned the idea and credited him with changing his perception of the issue.

When Fort Allen was turned into a refugee shelter for Hatians in 1981, Alegría joined Inés Mendoza, Isolina Ferré and Jaime Benítez in protest. His friendship with Mendoza lasted throughout her life, an in 1990 she gave Alegría participation in the disposition of the Muñoz Marín-Mendoza estate along her children. After "strategically" voting for the Commonwealth in the 1993 referendum, Alegría argued that in times were the Free Trade Agreement and European Union existed, there was a possibility that the United States could recognize the sovereignty of Puerto Rico and renounce things like defense.

He elaborated in a brochure, where he assessed that the aspirations of independence supporters were based on political sovereignty, national identity, language and culture, while statehood supporters were mostly concerned with the United States citizenship and its rights. Coining the term "Estado Libre Asociado Soberano" Alegría argued that both ends could be met within it, dismissing that it was either "impossible" or "utopic" as a goal since it was closer to what the United States argued before the UN in 1953 than the territorial status. He elaborated that by recognizing the sovereignty of Puerto Rico in association, the colonial character of the Commonwealth could be overcome. It was the apparent support for sovereignty in the PPD's 2000 platform that convinced Alegría to vote for Sila Calderón and Aníbal Acevedo Vilá in those elections, forcing him to defend his posture from independence supporters. Among his critics was the Puerto Rican Independence Party (PIP) who used the media to comment of what they perceived as a strategic error.

Despite his beliefs, he would on occasion participate in actions taken at Washington. In 1960, Alegría led a group of professionals that wrote to Eisenhower in protest for his apparent support for Luis A. Ferré' candidature (as noted by James Hagerty). In 1969, Alegría clashed with American Herbert Wardell over the idea that black students were "intellectually challenged" when compared to other races, citing additional concern that such an idea could have found its way to others through the latter's work as professor.

Alegría also participated in an interim committee of the Virginia Associated State Councils of Arts. Alegría pushed for Puerto Rico to receive membership as an associate member of the UNESCO, also holding an exhibit of Puerto Rican art at the UN to further this cause. For this end he received the opposition of then-governor Romero Barceló and Luis A. Ferré, but drafted a resolution and gathered the support of enough personalities and countries for the matter to be attended at the Conferencia Mundial de Políticas Culturales in 1982. However, when the US left UNESCO, the effort stalled. Further attempts when Federico Mayor Zaragoza ascended were inconclusive. In 1993, the UNESCO recognized him by awarding the Picasso medal. By the turn of the millennium, Alegría had tried to push the matter among three directors, also pressuring Amadau W. Bow and Kirchiro Matansura. Alegría preferred diplomacy, and it wasn't until Romero Barceló pushed the "cultural laws" that he first participated in a protest at the Capitolio.

=== Death ===
Alegría lived in Old San Juan in his later years, until his death on July 7, 2011. He had been hospitalized in San Juan's Centro Medico (Medical Center Hospital) a few weeks before his death. After a brief recovery, he relapsed and was returned to the medical center, where he died of heart failure. Flags of Puerto Rico government offices were flown at half staff for five days of mourning. He was buried at Santa María Magdalena de Pazzis Cemetery in San Juan, Puerto Rico.

== Publications ==
=== Books ===
- La Fiesta de Santiago Apostol en Loiza Aldea [The Feast of St. James the Apostle]. San Juan: Coleccion de Estudios Puertoriquena, 1954.
- The Archaic Tradition in Puerto Rico. with Henry Bigger Nicholson and Gordon R. Willey. Salt Lake City: Society for American Archaeology, 1955
- Los renegados: narración inspirada en un cuento popular puertorriqueño [The Renegades: narration inspired by a Puerto Rican tale]. San Juan: Instituto de Cultura Puertoriquena, 1962.
- Cafe. San Juan: Instituto de Cultura Puertorriqueña, 1967.
- The Three Wishes; a collection of Puerto Rican folktales. New York: Harcourt, Brace & World, 1969. ISBN 0152868712
- El Fuerte de San Jeronimo del Boqueron [The Fort of San Jeronimo de Boqueron]. San Juan: Instituto de Cultura Puertoriquena, 1969.
- Descubrimiento, conquista y colonización de Puerto Rico, 1493–1599. [Discovery, Conquest, and Colonization of Puerto Rico, 1493-1599]. With Mela Pons Alegría. San Juan: Coleccion De Estudios Puertorriquenos, 1969.
- El programa de parques y museos del Instituto de Cultura Puertorriqueña. [The parks and museums program of the Puerto Rican Institute of Culture ] Barcelona: M. Pareja, 1973.
- Apuntes en torno a la mitología de los indios taínos de las Antillas Mayores y sus orígenes suramericanos [Notes on the Mythology of the Taino Indians of the Greater Antilles and their South American Origins]. San Juan: Centro de Estudios Avanzados de Puerto Rico y el Caribe, 1978. ISBN 8449900948
- El Instituto de Cultura Puertorriqueña, 1955–1973: 18 años contribuyendo a fortalecer nuestra conciencia nacional. [The Institute of Puerto Rican Culture, 1955-1973: 18 Years Contributing to Strengthening Our National Consciouness]. Instituto de Cultura Puertorriqueña, 1979. ISBN 8449901189
- Las primeras representaciones gráficas del indio americano, 1493–1523. [The First Graphic Representation of the American Indian]. Centro de Estudios Avanzados de Puerto Rico y el Caribe, 1978
- El uso de la incrustación en la escultura de los indios antillanos. [The use of inlay in the sculpture of the Antillean Indians]. San Juan: Centro de Estudios Avanzados de Puerto Rico y el Caribe Fundación García Arévalo, 1981.
- History of the Indians of Puerto Rico. Coleccion De Estudios Puertorriquenos, 1983. ISBN 8439912099
- La vida de Jesucristo según el santero puertorriqueño Florencio Cabán [The life of Jesus Christ according to the Puerto Rican Santero Florencio Cabán]. Centro de Estudios Avanzados de Puerto Rico y el Caribe, 1983. ISBN 8449987830
- San Juan de Puerto Rico. with Manuel Méndez Guerrero and María de los Angeles Castro Arroyo. Quinto Centenario: Instituto de Cooperación Iberoamericana, 1989.
- Cuentos Folkloricos de Puerto Rico [Folkloric Tales of Puerto Rico]. Editora Corripio, 1990. ISBN 8439908555
- Juan Garrido, El Conquistador Negro En Las Antillas, Florida, Mexico y California c. 1503-1540. Centro De Estudios Avanzados De Puerto Rico y El Caribe, 1990.
- Taíno: Pre-Columbian art and culture from the Caribbean. with Fatima Bercht and Estrellita Brodsky. New York: Monacelli Press, 1998. ISBN 1885254822
- Las artes populares en las Américas. San Juan: Museo de las Americas, 1999.
- La semilla que sembramos: autobiografía del proyecto nacional. with Pedro Angel Reina Pérez. San Juan: Editorial Cultural, 2003.
- Cuentos Folclóricos de las Antillas Mayores Cuba - Jamaica - Haití - República Dominicana - Puerto Rico e Islas Vírgenes. [Folk tales from the Greater Antilles Cuba - Jamaica - Haiti - Dominican Republic - Puerto Rico and Virgin Islands] Collection of Puerto Rican Studies, 2008. ISBN 9781934461334
- Excavations at Maria de La Cruz Cave & Hacienda Grande Village Site, Loiza, Puerto Rico. with Irving Rouse. Yale University Publications in Anthropology, July 2010. ISBN 9780913516164

=== Journal articles ===
- "Origin and diffusion of the term "Cacique"". Proceedings of the 29th International Congress of Americanists, Acculturation in the Americas vol 2, 1952.
- "La Fiesta De Santiago Apostol En Loiza Aldea" ["The Feast of St. James the Apostle"]. Revista de Ciencias Sociales. pp. 29–44.
- "Ball Courts and Ceremonial Plazas in the West Indies" Yale University Publications in Anthropology, vol. 7., 1983.

=== Documentary ===
- Las Fiestas de Santiago Apóstol en Loíza Aldea (1949)

== See also ==
- List of Puerto Ricans
- Puerto Rican scientists and inventors
