= José Celso Barbosa House Museum =

Historic house in Bayamón, Puerto Rico

- Casa Natal Dr. José Celso Barbosa
- U.S. National Register of Historic Places
- Puerto Rico Historic Sites and Zones
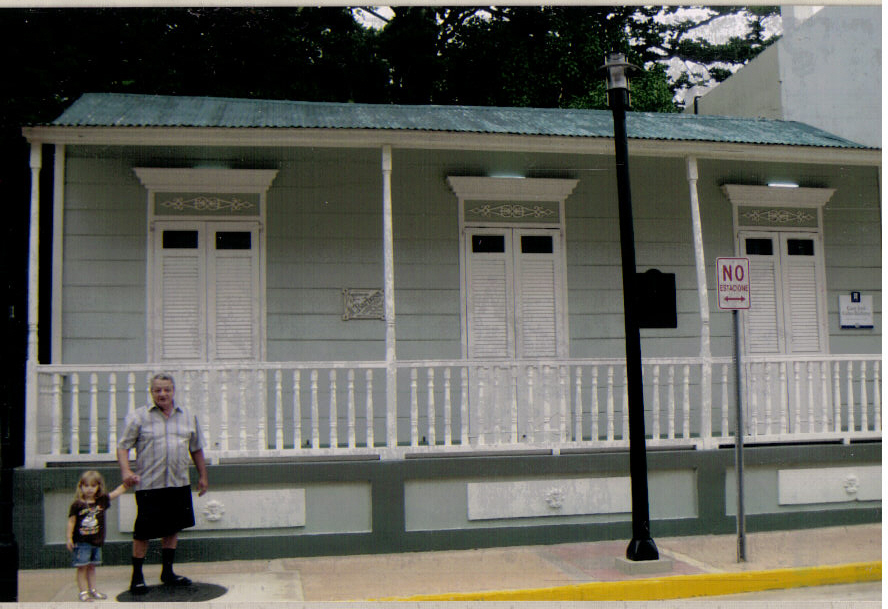
- The Barbosa House in 2008

- Location within Puerto Rico
- Location: 16 Barbosa Street; Bayamón, Puerto Rico
- Coordinates: 18°23′57″N 66°09′16″W
- Area: 1,509.66 sq ft (140.252 m^{2})
- Built: c. 1850
- Architectural style: Vernacular
- Restored: 1969
- Restored by: Institute of Puerto Rican Culture
- NRHP reference No.: 84003156
- RNSZH No.: 2000-(RMSJ)-00-JP-SH

Significant dates
- Added to NRHP: August 24, 1984
- Designated RNSZH: February 3, 2000

The José Celso Barbosa House Museum (Spanish: Casa Museo José Celso Barbosa) is a historic house museum in Bayamón municipality, Puerto Rico.

The house was added to the U.S. National Register of Historic Places in 1984, under the name Casa Natal Dr. José Celso Barbosa (English: Dr. José Celso Barbosa Birth House), and to the Puerto Rico Register of Historic Sites and Zones in 2000.

== See also ==
- National Register of Historic Places listings in metropolitan San Juan, Puerto Rico
