= Leticia del Rosario =

Puerto Rican nuclear physicist

- Born: June 4, 1914; Yauco, Puerto Rico
- Died: October 9, 2009 (aged 95); San Juan, Puerto Rico
- Education: University of Puerto Rico, University of Chicago
- Scientific career
- Fields: physics, nuclear physics
- Thesis: The Relative Abundance of Lithium Isotopes

Leticia del Rosario or Leticia R. del Rosario Mejía (June 4, 1914 – October 9, 2009) was the first Puerto Rican woman with a PhD in Physics and a professor and researcher in nuclear physics at the University of Puerto Rico (UPR).

== Early years ==
Leticia del Rosario (full name: Leticia Rafaela del Rosario Mejía) was born in Yauco, Puerto Rico on June 4, 1914. Her parents were Carlos Antonio del Rosario Rodríguez, a pharmacist, and Juana Josefa Mejía Rodríguez. She was the youngest of eight children. When she was 3 years old, the family moved to San Juan, Puerto Rico, where she completed her primary and secondary studies at Colegio Puertorriqueño de Niñas, a secular private school for women.

== Education ==
Del Rosario attended the University of Puerto Rico (UPR), Río Piedras campus, from 1931 until 1935, where she earned a bachelor’s degree in physical sciences. After teaching high school for two years, she traveled to the University of Chicago in 1940 to continue graduate studies. There she worked with Arthur J. Dempster in a thesis titled “The Relative Abundance of Lithium Isotopes”. After obtaining a master’s degree, she returned to Puerto Rico and continued teaching in high school before joining the University of Puerto Rico as a professor of physics in 1943. In 1944, she went back to Chicago to continue doctoral studies under the guidance of Samuel K. Allison, at that time Director of the Institute for Nuclear Studies (renamed as Enrico Fermi Institute for Nuclear Studies in 1955). While in Chicago, she was also a student of Arthur H. Compton, and Enrico Fermi. In 1948 she graduated with the thesis “Use of electron multiplier tube as a new technique in disintegration experiment”.

== Academic career at UPR ==
In 1943, Leticia del Rosario was hired as an Assistant Professor in the Department of Physics of the University of Puerto Rico, Río Piedras campus. At the time, Jaime Benítez Rexach was the chancellor, physicist Facundo Bueso Sanllehí was dean of natural sciences, and Amador Cobas was chair of the physics department. After one year, she took a leave of absence to continue her doctoral studies. In 1948, after obtaining her PhD, she went back to UPR. Soon after that, in 1949, she was designated chair of the physics department. She held that position until 1954.

In the summer of 1949, she traveled to Oak Ridge National Laboratory (ORNL), sponsored by the Rockefeller Foundation, to participate in a training course on the use of radioisotopes for research in nuclear physics, medicine, and agriculture. At UPR she was member of the Cosmic Rays Laboratory and the director in 1953–1954. In this period, her research focused on cosmic radiation measurements. With funding from the Research Corporation and the Office of Naval Research, she and physicist Jesús Dávila Aponte investigated the range distribution of μ-mesons at sea level. Later they conducted a study to measure underground cosmic radiation. She also collaborated in a study, led by Amador Cobas, to measure the variation of cosmic rays at higher altitudes. The experiments were conducted using globes that contained photographic plates sensitive to protons and beta rays.

In 1957, Del Rosario led the organizing committee of the symposium Atomic Energy and the University of Puerto Rico ("Energía Atómica y la Universidad de Puerto Rico"). The symposium sponsored by ORNL and UPR, was celebrated on January 24–28. Important scientists including Lewis I. Strauss, director of the US Atomic Commission and Alvin M. Weinberg, director of ORNL, participated in the meeting. The topics discussed included plans to install nuclear reactors in Puerto Rico, for scientific research and power generation.

In 1959, she transferred from the School of Natural Sciences to the Department of Physical Sciences in the School of General Studies at UPR. In 1961, she was director of a training program for physics high school teachers funded by the National Science Foundation. She was chair of the physical sciences department from 1964 until 1966 when she returned to her position in the School of Natural Sciences. In 1970, Del Rosario was designated Dean of Studies, a position she held until her retirement in 1973.

== Affiliations ==
Leticia Del Rosario was member of the American Physical Society and represented Puerto Rico in the Latin American Council for Cosmic Radiation ("Consejo Latinoamericano para Radiación Cósmica" (CLARC)). At UPR she was member of the Academic Senate and founder and president of the University Faculty Organization ("Organización de Profesores Universitarios"). In 1977, she was elected member of the Puerto Rico Academy of Arts and Sciences.

== Late years ==
Del Rosario retired from UPR in 1973. In 1974 she was named Emeritus Professor. In 1980, she was designated by the governor of Puerto Rico as director of Institute of Puerto Rican Culture (Instituto de Cultura Puertorriqueña). She was in the position until 1983. She died in San Juan on October 9, 2009.
