= Instituto de Cultura Puertorriqueña =

Ministry of Culture of Puerto Rico

Coordinates: 18.46757°N 66.12065°W

- Founded: 1955; 71 years ago
- Type: Government agency
- Purpose: Cultural promotion and preservation, curation and conservation of historic paintings and buildings.
- Region served: Puerto Rico
- Key people: Dr. Ricardo Alegría
- Website: www.icp.pr.gov/en/

The Instituto de Cultura Puertorriqueña (ICP, 'Institute of Puerto Rican Culture') is an institution of the Government of Puerto Rico responsible for the establishment of the cultural policies required in order to study, preserve, promote, enrich, and diffuse the cultural values of Puerto Rico. Since October 1992, its headquarters have been located at the site of the old colonial Spanish Welfare House in Old San Juan.

The ICP was created by order of Law Number 89, signed June 21, 1955, and it started operating in November of that year. Its first Executive Director was sociologist and archeology PhD Ricardo Alegría, who felt that "There was a need to counteract decades of harmful influences, which at times were openly contradictory to our cultural values, with an effort to promote those values. There was an urgent need to struggle against a psychological conditioning which had become deeply rooted in our colonial society, and which led many Puerto Ricans to systematically diminish anything autochthonous or anything that seemed autochthonous, while disproportionately valuing everything that was foreign, or that seemed foreign." It was in this social and sociological environment that the Instituto de Cultura Puertorriqueña was born. The bill provoked fierce debate as, for some whose political views were in favor of the direction Puerto Rican politics had been taking in the several years prior to the debate, the bill touched on the very essence of the political status of Puerto Rico. Once the bill was signed into law, the controversy created by the new government institution did not end.

== Mission ==
In general terms, the organizational structure of the Instituto responds to the functions assigned to it by Law. Various programs address to the following aspects of the Puerto Rican culture: promote the arts, archeology, museums, parks, monuments, historic zones, music, theater, dance, and the Archives and the National Library of Puerto Rico. It extends its promotion of these throughout all the municipalities of Puerto Rico through local Cultural Centers. These Cultural Centers are autonomous organizations.

== Functions ==
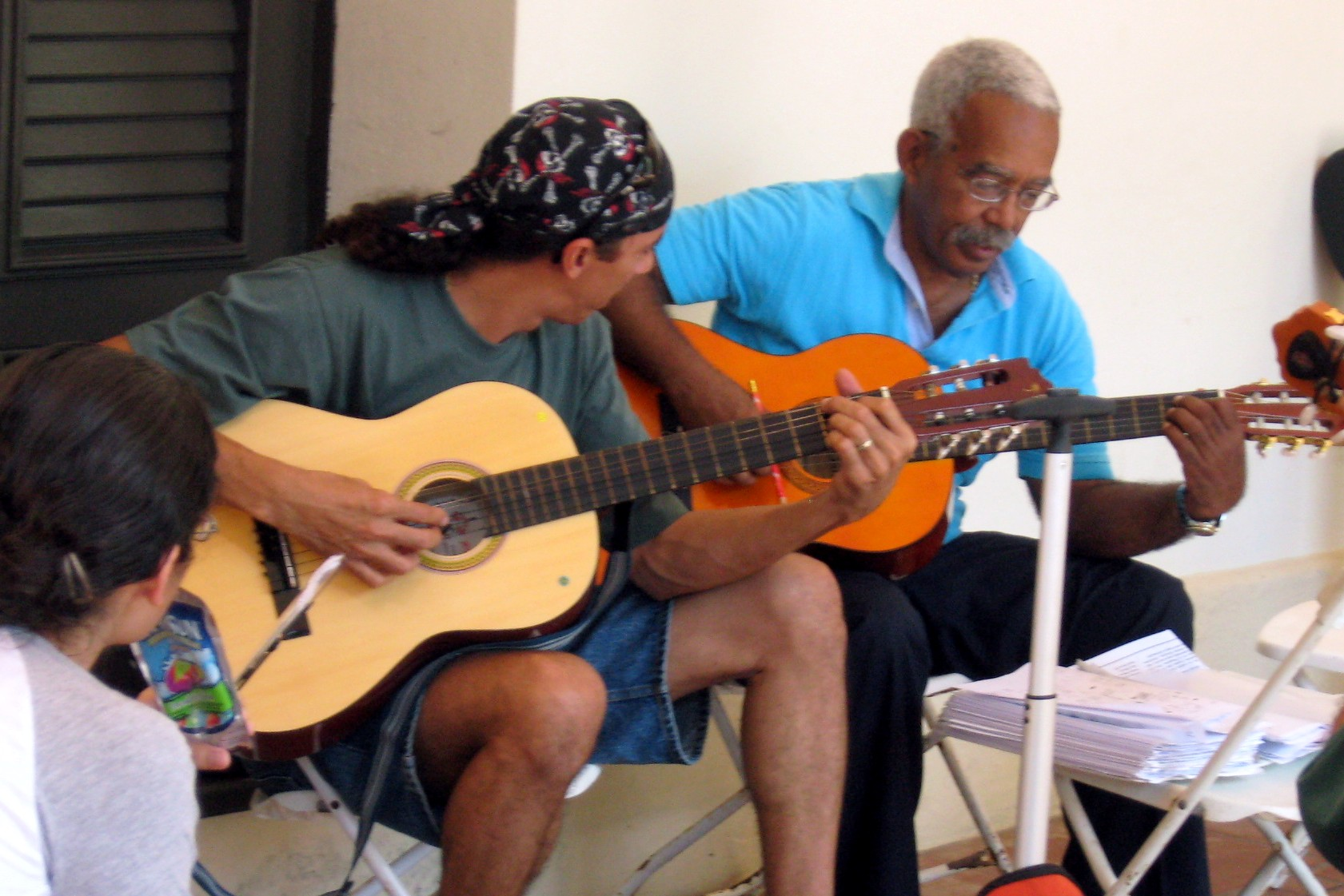
Guitar class sponsored by ICP

The Instituto manages the Puerto Rico General Archives (Archivo General de Puerto Rico) since 1956 as well as the Puerto Rico National Library, has a program on Puerto Rican archeology, sponsors programs in the visual arts, the popular arts and handcrafts, the theatrical arts, and the musical arts, has a branch that publishes books and periodicals, manages a number of museums and parks, and has restored many historic buildings throughout Puerto Rico as part of its historic zones and monuments program. Many of these buildings have been turned into museums. As an example, as part of a project of restoration of the Ponce Historic Zone, the Instituto de Cultura Puertorriqueña assembled a 13-member team to research and survey what changes would need to be implemented for the restoration as that zone.

High-resolution images of works of art from Puerto Rico's museums are being digitized and made available online with the help of the Instituto, Google Arts & Culture, Lin Manuel Miranda and other stakeholders. 350 such works were available online by November 7, 2019.

== History ==
=== Proposal ===
According to José Trias Monge the concern of Luis Muñoz Marín (then president of the Senate of Puerto Rico) about the role of local culture within the territorial framework of the political status of Puerto Rico dated as far back as 1949. After being elected governor, the functionary discussed the issue again in 1953, trying to separate it from the political issue, and arguing about being selective about what should be adopted from American culture. In the days that followed the Spanish-American War, there had been a decline in the condition of historic buildings as well as an increase in consumerism. On November 18, 1954, Arnold Miles presented a "program" (formally named The Preservation of the Cultural Heritage of Puerto Rico) to preserve "the cultural heritage of Puerto Rico", asserting that it had "been neglected" under the American flag. He proposed the creation of the Commonwealth Trust for Historical Preservation. Muñoz responded by congratulating Miles for the report, which was then discussed in anticipation of a legislative project.

In January 1955, the governor announced before the legislative assembly that he intended to create a public corporation to preserve and promote Puerto Rican heritage. Archeologist and anthropologist Ricardo Alegría, historian Arturo Morales Carrión, architect Baraño de la Junta Planes and others held reunions with Muñoz, who was also interested in acquiring the Junghanns Collection. A law allowing for the expropriation of private collections/historic documents for public display and/or preservation was assigned to then Secretary of Justice Trías Monge, with the intention of keeping it in Puerto Rico and prevent it from falling into the hands of foreign collectors. Alegría analyzed foreign laws to this effect, including countries from throughout the hemisphere. Carrión proposed following the example of the Casa de la Cultura Ecuatorian in terms of scope, but with autonomy from the central government. He collaborated with representative Jorge Font Saldaña in the first legislative draft. The new institution was going to be solely focused in the investigation, preservation and promotion of culture, distancing it from being a university.

=== Legislation ===
On May 3, 1955, Project 1381 was presented before the Puerto Rico House of Representatives by its president, Ernesto Ramos Antonini. During the ensuing debate, there was a clash between cultural nationalism and universalism, as well as the opposition arguing that it could serve as a tool for the PPD to politicize culture. Carrión, Alegría (in representation of the UPR), Rafael A. González and Luis M. Rodríguez Morales (the latter two conservationists from San Juan) and others attended the public hearings. Within the PPD, universalist José Arsenio Torres opposed it calling it "of totalitarian tendencies", argued that it was only "going to support a political ideology [the Commonwealth]" and dismissed this type of culture as not "a real problem for the people". Independentist Marcos A. Ramírez Irizarry proposed an amendment, citing concern that "no official interpretation of [Puerto Rican] history or cultural values" would be "imposed" by it. Statehooder Leopoldo Figueroa argued against "culture viewed from [the PPD's] perspective", while his partner Luis A. Ferré argued against "static culture", before employing a universalist approach by arguing for the name to be "Puerto Rican Institute of Culture", de-emphasizing local customs. Two days later, the project was sent to the Treasury Commission for the study of its scope. On May 17, 1955, an amended version defined its functions, how the Board of Directors would elect the executive director (who would work for $9,600) and a $35,000 budget. The project passed with 35 votes in favor and 13 against. The Senate of Puerto Rico approved it on May 25, 1955. During the summer, Muñoz discussed his idea for "Operation Serenity", which he intended to serve as a counterpart to the industrialization process known as "Operation Bootstrap", at Harvard University. On June 21, he signed the creation of the Institute of Puerto Rican Culture into Public Law 89.

=== First board ===
The ICP's first board included Trías Monge, Enrique Laguerre, Salvador Tió, José A. Buitrago, Carrión, secretary Teodoro Vidal and president Eugenio Fernández Méndez and first assembled on October 3, 1955, at La Fortaleza.

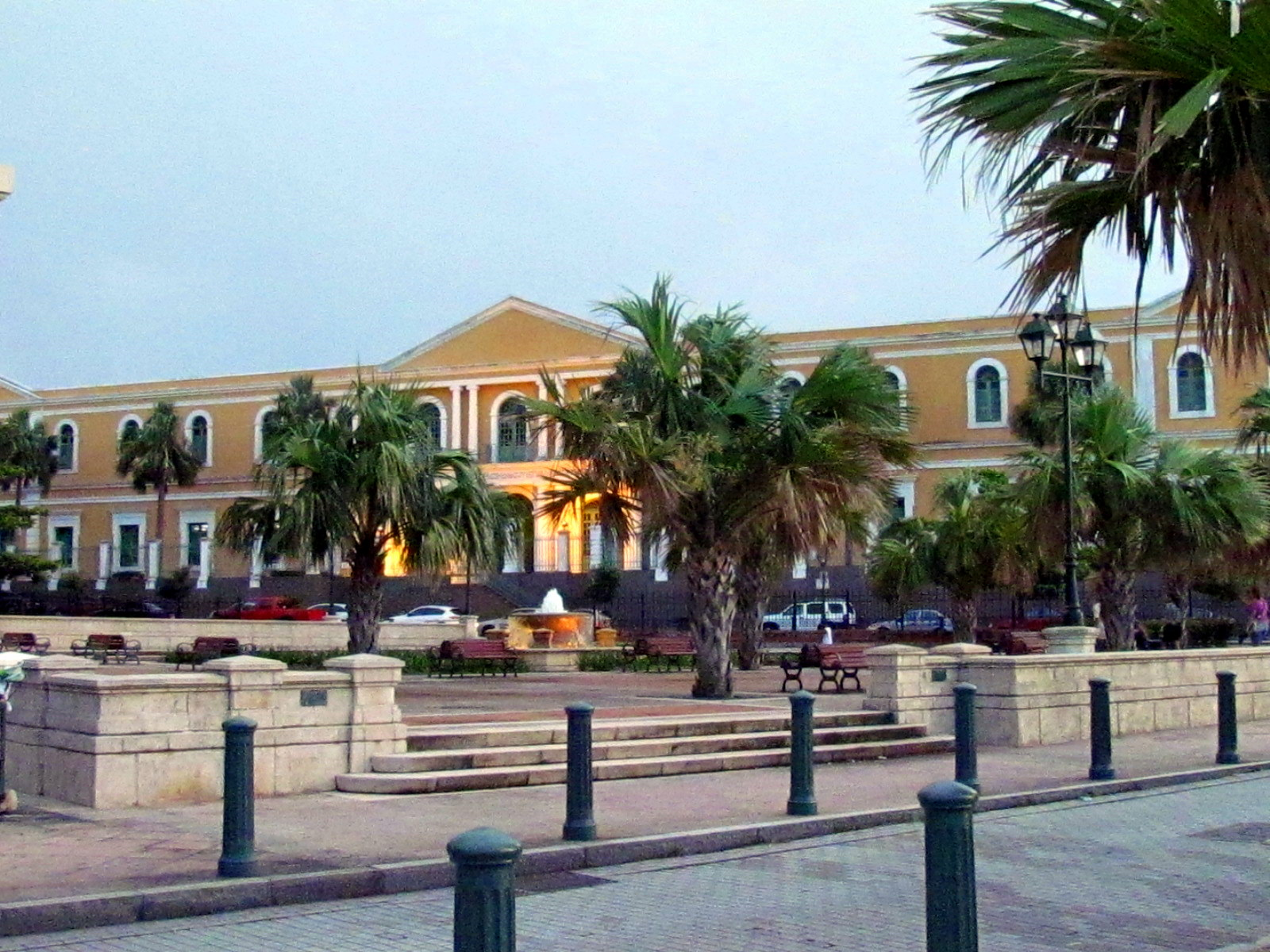
Instituto de Cultura Puertorriqueña in 2011

Secretary of Instruction Mariano Villaronga held a meeting with Alegría about the ICP, where he noted that he would have preferred the name Comisión para la Cultura (to differentiate it from Franco's Instituto de Cultura Hispánica). On October 10, 1955, Buitrago proposed Alegría to the role of executive director with the support of Laguerre. Tió and Carrión proposed Nilita Vientós Gastón. Alegría won 5-1, and Muñoz Marín approved it despite having reserves with Alegría's nationalist political ideology, when Tomás Blanco and the governor's own wife, Ines (who had been a teacher for the young archeologist) supported it. On October 23, 1955, the Board of Directors requested a work plan, which was presented the following week covering the first year and a half of operations. Restoration of buildings and objects with cultural, historic and artistic value; preservation of historic and cultural heritage at large, gathering of valuable material; research; promotion and divulgation were the key aspects of the document. For this, the scope was to include anything following the European arrival during the 15th century up to modern times, any cultural manifestation including folklore was relevant. The Board of Directors held frequent reunions during this stage, often bi-weekly. In the fifth, Alegría demanded a cut in his salary, but the board at large declined. Instead, he began investing it back into the ICP. Inter-agencias coordination was discussed, in particular how the Planning Board could be involved in the restoration of Old San Juan, but additional clashes and difficulties were experienced with the Treasury Department, Budget, Personnel and Supply among others. The UPR was also defensive, believing that it was going to lose functions that had so far been controlled by it. Alegría brought members from across the political spectrum to the ICP, but it was the contract of Roberto Beascoechea Lota and Isabel Gutiérrez del Arroyo the ones that caused more trouble, being nationalists while the Gag Law was in full effect. Francisco Espinoza of the Department of Justice interfered, but desisted from pursuing the matter after Alegría proposed that the matter was settled in a court, knowing well that Trías Monge (who had authored the Gag Law as requested, but actually opposed its implementation) was the Secretary of Justice. Marisa Rosado was later brought to work as Alegría's secretary. Alegría began pursuing the acquisition of the Caguana site, which he had failed to accomplish under the UPR. Shortly after he was confirmed in October 1955, Eliseo Combas of El Mundo sardonically criticized his interest in Talla de Santos and other similar practices.

=== Operational organization and reception ===
With its establishment, the ICP created a series of precedents in areas such as government-sponsored cultural institutions and building restoration that preceded the cultural efforts of the federal government during the Kennedy administration (which later led to the National Foundation of Arts and Humanities during the Johnson administration and the National Historic Preservation Act of 1966 (Robert McNutty, who advised Congress, spent time in Puerto Rico to study the restoration of San Juan and the ICP's protocol, crediting Alegría for providing a definition of "cultural heritage". Kennedy himself had discussed the functioning of the ICP with Alegría during his visit to Puerto Rico, as part of activism held at La Fortaleza on December 15, 1961. During the research phase that led to the law that created the National Foundation of Arts and Humanities, Livingston L. Biddle traveled to Puerto Rico and learned of the ICP's restoration efforts. Afterwards, Henry Allen Moe recruited Alegría as an advisor on museums for the National Endowment for the Humanities.

In 1959, Nelson Rockefeller attended a reunion at La Fortaleza, and during the travel came in contact with the ICP's work, later loaning his collection for exhibit. A year later, he sent a commission to study the institute's work in an effort that led to the creation of the New York State Arts Council. His then-assistant Nancy Hanks described Alegría as "an international leader [...] in the field of arts" and credited him with inspiring the National Endowment for the Arts. Both would later coincide at the National Council on the Arts, where he exchanged notes on his work with English-language plays at the Civic Theater and noted a similarly with the Expansion Arts initiative for minorities in the states.

Both the pro-statehood PNP and the pro-Independence PIP internally opposed the creation of the ICP, citing through their leaders Luis A. Ferré and Gilberto Concepción de Gracia their concerns that the PPD would politicize/monopolize what constituted "culture". After an extended debate, Marcos A. Ramírez Irizarry (who had been approached by PPD Jorge Font Saldaña) defeated Concepción's posture among legislators, but the Executive Commission voted in support of the president and Ramírez fell in line. Ferré continued his opposition, wanting to name it "Puerto Rican Institute of Culture", de-emphasizing the local culture. Figures like José Arsenio Torres also expressed skepticism about the possibility of it serving to promote nationalism. Historically, the PNP opposed the ICP, which they considered a "breeding ground for radicals". A belief that Alegría countered by noting how artists tended to believe in independence even before joining and that figures like José Oliver, Walter Murray Chiesa and Aurelio Tió were statehooders. In private correspondence, Antonio Colorado argued in favor of Ricardo Alegría for the office of executive secretary, feeling that he didn't care for compliments and would perform an efficient job, besides possessing the track record. Alegría argued in favor of Tomás Blanco, but the latter declined due to previous differences with Muñoz Marín. In the process, Muñoz Marín consulted figures like Arturo Morales Carrión to create a "general plan" to pursue several cultural proposals (among them, the restoration of Old San Juan).

The ICP's model took inspiration from the Ecuadorian House of Culture, the Uruguayan Service of Cultural Diffusion, the American Institute of International Education and the British Council. Alegría created the ICP's spectrum emphasizing his interests as an anthropologist, requiring advisers in other topics. He established initiatives with the intention of becoming a broader "tradition", so it would outlive his tenure. He held an open doors policy, welcoming whoever wanted to meet with him and continued working after hours at his house. In order to keep the ICP independent of politics, orders were given not to ask affiliation, donate or even cooperate with legal investigations if the motives were deemed political. Regardless of political influence, any individual would only be contracted if there was an opening in the pre-existing structure. Muñoz Marín's wife, Inés Mendoza, had been a teacher to a young Alegría and supported several of his initiatives, also allowing a relaxed access for him to La Fortaleza. Under Alegría, work activities would also include a cultural element, such as being held at Caguana. Alegría would initially help employees in debt, leading to the creation of the Urayoán Credit and Savings Cooperative.

Following its establishment, the ICP faced critics from political figures such as Eliseo Combas Guerra of El Mundo, who either opposed promoting Puerto Rican culture as defined by "the PPD" or considered it an extension of the Commonwealth initiative. Other groups, such as artists Rafael Rivera García and Rafael Ferrer, resented the standards used to define art by the ICP for diverse reasons. The traditionalist preferences of both Alegría and director José Oliver placed the ICP at odds with abstract painters, despite the collaboration of Luis Hernández Cruz with the institution. However, the curator of the Engraving Department of the New York Metropolitan Museum A. Hyatt Mayor considered that the ICP's work was fostering an "artistic explosion" product of a changing socioeconomic landscape.

The ICP received control of several cultural initiatives that up to that point had been assigned to the UPR and superseded the Fine Arts Department as the main hub of development for local artists. The further acquisition of the General Archive and its funding, which angered Benítez and his Occidentalist clique. Arturo Morales Carrión would lead the General Archive. The ICP's approach also represented a contrast to the universalist approach promoted during this time at the UPR. Figures like Thomas S. Hayes used the press to diminish the accomplishments of the ICP and label it as unoriginal in the wake of the transfer of the archives. Despite this, others like José Arsenio Torres were moved to favor the ICP based on its political neutrality.

=== Historical, archeology and art programs ===
Isabel Gutiérrez del Arroyo and Arturo Dávila were placed in charge of matters related to local history. The archeological investigation program received the collaboration of Irvin Rouse (Yale) and initially focused at Caguana, also studying sites at San Juan and Aguada. The conference program began in 1956 in collaboration with the UPR, incorporating both local and foreign experts, being later compiled in 1960. In 1956, Héctor Campos Parsi was placed in charge of the Music Advisory Commission and the Musical Recording Commission. The latter gathered a variety of 19-20 century, contemporary and folkloric recordings and documents, which was used as basis for an archive. Another initiative, the Archive of the Word, gathered speeches and other such expressions.

When the UPR invited Rufino Tamayo to inaugurate a mural named Prometeo in its library, he visited the ICP and Alegría (with whom he was acquainted), a move that angered Benítez.The ICP's board would include figures like Salvador Tió, Enrique Laguerre and Eugenio Fernández Méndez. Roberto Beascoechea aided Alegría. In 1950, the Center of Puerto Rican Art was created. As the transfer of the ancient Spanish forts became impending, the legislature assigned $53,000 to the ICP for their conservation. In 1956, the cultural center program integrated pre-existing institutions, which received funds exchange for cultural work. Established in 1957, the cultural diffusion program created a method for the cultural centers to act autonomously in regards to initiatives that originated in their vicinity rather than depend on directions from San Juan. Other programs, like the Ballets of San Juan, were also sponsored.The 1955 budget was $35,000. During the early years, the budget was limited to the point that Alegría would occasionally work without being paid and had to repurpose the kitchen as his office and request funds for air conditioning. During his stay, he didn't ask for a raise and declined offers. Likewise, he used the same office for advisers Tomás Blanco and Lidio Cruz Monclova, both of whom lashed against each other upon learning of this. Artists also clashed among themselves.A grants program was established for investigation and studies.

=== Interaction with other agencies ===
From the beginning, the ICP and Fomento were immersed in a competition, further fueled by diverging ideas about culture among their leaders. Alegría himself was noted for opposing the universalist concept of culture, for which he clashed with figures like Teodoro Moscoso and Luis A. Ferré, due to his belief that anything good enough to gather universal appraisal was born from within a national context. From within Fomento, the former held a belief that there was no such thing as national culture and as such introduced Festival Casals as an event were artist from abroad converged at San Juan for days and left, contrasting Alegría's methodological approach. The latter would once claim that Fomento viewed the ICP as "trying to cling to roots that were related to the black man, to the Indian, with creole things. Which to some was mediocre, third rate." The rivalry between organization became so evident that César Andreu Iglesias wrote a satirical "what-if" piece postulating what would have if they changed seats. The ICP mingled within the fringes of Fomento's jurisdiction, fostering and promoting typical restaurants and other establishments as part of Alegría's vision of a "Puerto Rican-flavored tourism". The ICP freely collaborated with other government entities, such as DIVEDCO, through graphic arts initiatives.

Early on, individual artists (both living and dead) were also given exclusive exhibits. In 1956, the ICP held an exhibit of 56 Campeche paintings. On April 15, 1957, the ICP received control over the commemoration of historic dates and figures. Monuments, paintings, books, activities and other initiatives were held to raise awareness of these. That year, Alegría himself opposed the creation of what he considered "artificial work posts", which were usually used in other agencies to accommodate political sympathizers, citing that doing so would reduce the institute's prestige. In 1957, the Advisory Commission of Publications was established, leading to the creation of the Biblioteca Popular and the republishing of the life's work of several local authors, new works, and promoting illustration initiatives. That year, the historical parks and museums program began, tasked with facilitating the establishment of museums, historical and archeological parks. The restoration of Fuerte San Jerónimo (which hosted a museum of Puerto Rican military history in 1962) and of Porta Coeli (which hosted a religious history museum in 1961) began during this time. A "rolling museum" also served to carry exhibitions elsewhere.

On October 7, 1957, the board declined a proposal that Alegría presented with the support of Tió to turn the Hermanos Behn house at Condado into a hotel as part of an initiative that would continue for years to "Puerto Ricanize [the local] tourism", then in hands of several foreign interests. In 1958, when Fomento requested the Arsenal la Puntilla building to establish a museum, Alegría received a copy of the request and objected, due to it infringing the limits of cultural affairs assigned to the ICP. That same year, restoration efforts at the Caparra settlement began. As part of his interest in Puerto Rican folklore, Alegría published Los renegados; Cuentos Folklóricos Puertorriqueños and The Three Wishes: A Collection of Puerto Rican Folktales.

Additional exhibits were held at Riverside in 1958-59 and at the Pratt Institute in 1959. That year, the cultural centers affiliated to the ICP held their first convention. The Ballets of San Juan joined the ICP-sponsored Puerto Rican theater festivals. The restoration of San Juan brought forth a rare collaboration between the ICP and Fomento, although Moscoso viewed it as an opportunity to attract tourists instead of something cultural. The entity clashed with the Corporación de Renovación Urbana y de Viviendas over the fate of La Perla. While the latter proposed constructing a public housing project to relocate the residents, the ICP proposed building an urbanization at La Puntilla for them and then turning the zone into a park. Neither project advanced, and despite the houses at La Puntilla being built, they were instead sold to middle class families to the ire of Alegría.

In 1958, the ICP's Graphic Arts Studio (Taller) was inaugurated and Lorenzo Homar (who had already done the same at DIVEDCO) was placed in charge, holding the office for 15 years and producing over 400 pieces. That year, the Casa del Libro was transferred to the ICP. In 1959, the ICP sponsored the bilingual appearance of Los soles truncos at the Goodman Memorial Theater as part of the Festival de las Americas held at Chicago. The restoration initiatives also attracted the attention of Austrian social philosopher Leopoldo Kohr, who wrote that the "paradox of the Institute of Puerto Rican Culture is that almost everything it does is right and almost everything it reasons is wrong", complimenting that it "is superior to anything that has been accomplished in England, France or Italy" despite what he perceived to be "Alegría's Petronius-like" role. By 1960, the budget had increased to $421,500 by the legislature. The next year the board attended the Treasury Commissions of the legislature, citing that the budget was insufficient to contrast specialized personnel or even competing with other government agencies. A raise for Alegría was proposed, despite his personal opposition.

=== Restoration, historical restoration ===
In 1960, the rezoning of parts of San Juan (of interest were Calle Sol, Calle de la Cruz and Calle San Sebastián and what was west of Calle Cristo) was proposed to prevent the proliferation of bars, which was justified as an attempt to neutralize the potential emergence of a "bohemian village". Furthermore, this was influenced by Alegría's interest to turn San Juan into more than "a purely touristic zone" and restore its residential value. In 1961, activities were held to celebrate the 15th anniversary of the ICP, which introduced the award of gold medals to figures within culture (a ceremony later held every 5 years). That same year, Alegría denounced before the PPD's youth organization of Río Piedras that the UPR under Benítez had "ignored Puerto Rican culture". The Cuban Revolution impacted how the left perceived his work at the ICP, while Alegría himself considered the idea of nationalism being pushed by Marxist-influenced groups was blinding them from other modalities and that such exaggerations -product of stances then in vogue- "was mud slinging [the Puerto Rican] people and [their] character". The ICP sent its book, Folklore Puertorriqueño abroad for re-editing. Upon being returned in October 1960, the customs administrator Francisco López Domínguez objected to its entry due to "vulgar" language, requiring the intervention of Resident Commissioner Antonio Fernós.

Upon learning that San Cristóbal and El Morro would be transferred to the National Forest Service, Alegría urged the military adviser to the governor -Teodoro Vidal- to make a push for them to be awarded to the local government instead and criticized the support of the Resident Commissioner for the initiative. Vidal later forwarded him a letter from Fernós Insern, arguing that he actually wanted for the preservation to be funded by foreign funds while the terrains of El Morro to be assigned to the local government. At the restored Casa del Callejón, museums to the 19th Century Puerto Rican family and the city's colonial architecture were established in 1963. That same year, a choral poesy program was created.

As early as 1964, the funding for cultural initiatives began declining, a situation that Alegría protested the following year. The budget of $900,000 for 1965 did not allow for the creation of a National Museum, School of Dramatic Arts, a Central Library or a School of Danza, which required at least $1,500,000 per the projections. On July 10, 1964, Muñoz Marín noted that The San Juan Star had been publishing a section called "Today in History" where they discussed foreign events, commissioning the ICP to create a historic calendar of Puerto Rico so that newspapers would publish local events as well. In 1965, the ICP inaugurated an archeological park at the Caguana site, which had been previously acquired by the institution. The following year, independentist Nilita Vientós Gastón wrote about the ICP's role in the wake of its tenth anniversary, citing her belief that the PPD had used it in trying to convert Puerto Rican culture into a "niche" while pushing an "ambiguous" political protect such as the Commonwealth.

In 1966 Alegría led the charge in an attempt to have Fort Brooke transferred to the ICP, where it would house the Conservatorio de Música and Casals Festival. That same year, the ICP created a band that would perform at public plazas. The Quinteto Figueroa and Cantores del ICP represent other groups affiliated to the institute. The music archive was transferred to the Archivo General. The Celebration of Puerto Rican Music began this year, becoming an annual celebration, featuring a number of competitions involving native instruments and displays of genres like plena and danza. The ICP's Cords Orquesta was also established. That year, Rafael Rivera García noted that he would no longer publicly criticize the ICP, believing that his previous concerns about the philosophical direction were unwarranted. In 1967, the Biblioteca General de Puerto Rico was created by the legislature and placed under the jurisdiction of the ICP.

That same year several individuals involved in the effort to restore the city of Santo Domingo in the Dominican Republic traveled to Puerto Rico and requested help from Alegría, implanting the ICP's model and receiving constant advise from him during the project. Alegría was contacted by the governments of St. Augustine and Grenada to provide guidance in their own restoration efforts and on how to employ tax exemptions to benefit owners of historic buildings.

Executive of investor Esso Standard Oil Andrés Freites later credited him for the success of the first phase and requested his collaboration during the second phase. The Museo de Bella's Artes established in 1967, within a structure given to the ICP and resorted. The San Juan Star made use of a piece published by Jay Jacobs claiming that Puerto Rican culture "never was" and lashing against Homar and his colleagues as having "passed the point where they might have done anything important". He was rebutted by Marta Traba, who further considered his posture a form of "cultural imperialism". In 1969, the owners of several restored buildings formed the Asociación pro Desarollo del San Juan Antiguo. In 1969, the Ballet Folklórico Areyto was founded, debuting in the Puerto Rican Theater Festival. The houses of Luis Muñoz Rivera and José Celso Barbosa were restored and converted into museums. In 1971, the ICP inaugurated a pharmacy museum. In 1972, Leopold Kohr would write positively about the ICP's work in a piece for El Mundo, citing the restoration effort as breathing life back to the scenery. Likewise, Lemaitre Román invited Alegría to participate in the restoration of Cartagena de Indias. Similar requests came from Kingston, Christianstead, Toronto and Cap Haitien. During his visit to Puerto Rico in 1968, William Murtagh of the NPS recognized that through the ICP "the government of Puerto Rico had been at the vanguard of the restoration movement since 1955".

=== Alegría's resignation ===
As soon as Luis A. Ferré won the elections, there were calls from within that party to have Alegría removed from the ICP due to ideological differences and a campaign against him was launched by Pedro Vázquez in El Día. He did not attend when the new governor was sworn in and on January 13, 1969, presented his resignation. However, the board refused to accept it and figures like Nilita Vientós, Noel Colón Martínez, Gilberto Concepción and Inés Mendoza rallied behind him, along a number of mayors and cultural centers. Within the statehood movement, Genarín Cautiño, Aurelio Tió and Carlos A. Pesquera Reyes supported him. Carlos E. Chardón wrote to José M. Hernández Matos of the ICP's Cultural Promotion Program suggesting that Alegría should stay long enough to finish his ongoing work. Eventually, Ferré reached a compromise with the ICP to secure better funding. Alegría remained in his office and worked on restoring La Fortaleza's internal decoration, but not without requesting the release from jail of Puerto Rican nationalists.

In February 1969, the PNP presented a bill to end the Ponce historic zone, despite the ICP having begun the restoration process. By this time, Alegría's family (in particular his brother José) had been targeted by groups that wanted to equal the project supposed familiar links to real state at San Juan, something that he had to personally rebuff in a letter to El Día. Despite Ferré's apparent support to continue his work at Ponce and the creation of a special committee that gave active participation to the ICP in that process, Alegría faced constant pressure to leave his office. Other clashes included, Carlos Romero Barceló attempt to get rid of a building that was halfway restored, Dos Zaguantes, which the ICP acquired with a loan from the bank of Fomento. The ICP, however, was able to preserve its fiscal autonomy and secure funds. Between March and April 1970, the ICP presented a version of Pedro Animala. That same year, the work of Puerto Rican artists abroad was featured.

In 1970, a museum about the colonization of Puerto Rico was inaugurated at the Caparra ruins, which featured Juan Ponce de León's baptismal font. On August 20, 1970, Alegría wrote to the administrative officer, Raúl Joglar, to oppose using resources to increase his salary. Ultimately, he reinvested the $204.17 difference back to the ICP, so it could be used to fund diverse initiatives (with the poor students of the Plastic Arts School taking priority). In 1971, another Campeche exhibit was held. The 1971 gathering of the Historic American Building Survey took place at San Juan in May. Six months later, Charles Peterson and Francisco Pons-Sorolla attended a conference on building restoration sponsored by Centro Norte-Sur. In April 1972, the ICP received $2,855,000 to fund the historic monument and buildings initiatives and the construction of the Centro de Bella's Artes at Santurce. That year, its production The Three Wishes was exhibited by the Library of Congress along other children's books in 1972.

A controversy emerged from the use of funding for the second Biennial, some of which came from a celebration of the Second Centenary of the United States. Alegría, a supporter of independence himself, argued that he saw nothing wrong since the use of these funds didn't affect the content. However, Homar left his office at the Escuela de Artes Plásticas.In 1972, the ICP received $125,000 from the National Fund of Arts, led by Nancy Hanks. Ferré, who supported the creation of a culture "without last names", was blamed by Alegría for "debilitating the institution". In June 1973, Francisco Arriví protested the discrepancies between his salary and that of Elías López from Festival Casals.

In 1974, Alegría proposed that each municipality should host festivals of something relevant to them. During Alegría's tenure, the ICP restored 30 buildings and promoted the independent restoration of several others according to its guidelines. Under him the Institute also managed to broaden the meaning of "Puerto Rican" to include non-Spanish aspects and counter those that considered the promotion of Taíno or Afro-Caribbean culture unsophisticated or "crazy". Alegría also documented the ICP itself, publishing El Instituto de Cultura Puertorriqueña: los primeros cinco años, 1955-1960, Los museos del Instituto de Cultura Puertorriqueña and El Instituto e Cultura Puertorriqueña 1955-1973: 18 años contribuyendo a fortalecer nuestra conciencia nacional.

The move to the convent, however, was followed by a systematic increase in bureaucracy. When combined with an increasingly widened umbrella that extended with the agreement with the University of Buffalo, the work flow proved to be complicated for the personnel. Alegría later noted that he left the ICP because he had grown tired of being incapable of working efficiently with other agencies amidst the increasing bureaucracy. He resented that being forced to spend most of his time doing paperwork for the Office of the Comptroller of Puerto Rico was limiting what the ICP could do. The governor initially resisted his resignation, but eventually accepted it. The personnel of the ICP was surprised by the decision. The board, led by Laguerre, also struggled to acquiesce the decision, but after two sessions accepted it "with reluctance" all the while urging him to continue involved in the institute's initiatives.

After leaving, Alegría noted that his contribution was "strengthening the national conscience" and popularizing a local history and figures that he considered Puerto Rican "can be proud of". While noting satisfaction that local culture had become highly popular, he also cautioned against focusing on the culinary and superfluous instead of the more significant aspects. Alegría also blamed improper funding and lack of interagency communication with the diffusion of culture not living up to its potential. Furthermore, he criticized the Department of Instruction for introducing children to foreign celebrations. Arturo Dávila credited him with "breaking the ice" in topics that were previously disregarded by "intellectuals with 19th Century ideas".

At the time, the ICP had grown to have 160 employees, a budget of $2,700,00, created 16 new museums and had worked in all municipalities, with 88 cultural centers affiliated to it. Alegría left several unfished projects, including the creation of museums for the sugar and coffee industries, history of Puerto Rican theater, postal stamps and numismatics, history of Puerto Rican music and Puerto Rican history. An unfinished museum of popular arts was later created at Balljá, an unrelated museum of the history of Ponce replaced another inconclusive initiative while his Hacienda Buena Vista, which the ICP had tried to acquire prior to the change in administration, would establish a museum of its agricultural history.

=== The political "cultural wars" and defunding ===
Rodríguez Morales succeeded him and brokered an advisor role for Alegría for which he was only paid a dollar per year. In this role he oversaw the creation of the Museo de la Herencia Puertorriqueña at the restored Dos Zaguanes building, for which he brought indigenous pieces from the piaroas and guahibos of the Orinoco region. He also continued directing the ICP's magazine. The AFAC had a duplicity of several of the ICP's functions, but its direct connection to the governor benefited the new entity and weakened the latter. The initiative had been pushed by Ferré from the Senate of Puerto Rico, who had invited Alegría to draft it. The former director declined and attended the hearings to argue against it, joining an opposition that was highlighted by the Comité Pro-Defensa de la Cultura Puertorriqueña and had been protesting outside the Capitolio, arguing that it was a de facto attempt to repeal "the law that created the institute". From within the ICP, only Héctor Campos Parsi argued in favor, leading to distancing and public critics from the other members. Executive director Luis Rodríguez Morales requested amendments. An elderly Muñoz Marín used the debilitation of the ICP as a weapon to criticize the PNP administration and claimed that if left unsupervised, they would "destroy its accomplishments". The laws were passed in May 1980, prompting Rodríguez Morales to quit. Romero Barceló named nuclear physicist Leticia del Rosario to replace him. In response to the appointment of a person with no experience in cultural affairs, the directors of the General Library (Roberto Beascoechea), Program of Modern Mediums of Massive Communication (Alberto Rodríguez), of Theater Promotion (Francisco Arriví) and of Cultural Promotion (Carlos Padilla) left their offices. Alegría also left the ICP's magazine after issue 85 (October-December 1979). In 1981, the ICP released its humanities-focused short film El arresto.

Leticia del Rosario had the Museo de la Herencia Puertorriqueña closed. Political struggles, misdirection, lack of proper care have led to part of Alegría's work being discontinued after his tenure. "Changes in museology" were cited by Mario Molina as the cause behind the closesure of several of the museums from the Alegría era. Entering the early 2000s, the early work of the ICP was still a point of contention among academics. James Martson Fitch and Charles Peterson of Columbia University were impressed at the restoration during a visit to San Juan. After being named executive director of the ICP by Carlos Romero Barceló, Leticia del Rosario stopped the establishment of a children museum at the Polvorín de Santa Elena, which had been underway since the days of Alegría.

After the PNP loss the 1984 elections, Elías López Sobá was named executive director of the ICP. Alegría pushed a project for cultural promotion, that would assign two more millions to the budget of the ICP, eliminating the AFAC and providing reparations for the perceived damage that its creation had done to the institution. Supported by Velda González, the legislation proceeded. The "Plan Alegría" would later make way for the Fondo Nacional para el Financiamiento del Quehacer Cultural. In 1985, the Centro de Bella's Artes was assigned to the ICP, but remaining under an independent subdirector. He also argued in favor of more autonomy for the ICP, removing the need for a governor appointment, expanding the board and giving space to the Ateneo and other culinary institutions to name members.

López Sobá's administration was controversial and in May 1985 Velda González opposed the project that modified the CBA's role and granted it to the ICP, believing that it gave too much influence to the director. A number of musicians supported her posture. By November the press was reporting on increasing unsatisfaction with his performance.

On March 28, 1985, Elías López Sobá was named ICP director. Alegría, however, did not attend his inauguration. The Museo de las Américas, left unfinished by Alegría decades before, was finally inaugurated in 1992. That year, the recordings of the Musical Recording Commission were transferred to the AGPR. When the Pedro Rosselló administration announced its intention to create the Museo Nacional de Bella's Artes, Alegría wrote a note to Awilda Palau, concerned that it may lead to stripping the ICP of its collections.

In 1997's Sponsored Identities Arlene Dávila argued that the ICP's work had allowed the PPD to "disguise its political dependent status", claiming that "the nation was associated with the realm of the cultural" and that by giving the independentists a niche they also took away political influence. In 1999, the ICP created the Museo de la Herencia Africana, which had been first proposed by Alegría during his incumbency. The institution eventually settled into the old Asilo de Beneficiencia, where it remains. The institution was one of 30 that joined in the celebrations surrounding Alegría's 80th birthday.

== Impact and reception ==
On November 19, 1960, the newspaper El Mundo interviewed several figures requesting their feedback on the work done by the ICP during its first five years. Writer Margot Arce de Vázquez considered its arrival "opportune in [that] critical moment of the life of our people", and a tool to bring "historic conscience and responsibility" and countering indifference over knowledge of its roots. Writer José M. Lázaro considered its work "extraordinary" and within its intended purpose. Writer Vicente Géigel Polanco considered that the promotion of cultural fields was "of the upmost quality", also noting Alegría as "hardworking". Painter Rafael Tufiño considered that the ICP's programs were "well intended" and that its artistic grants had been "well oriented". Architect José Firpi said that its restoration of Old San Juan had been "an important contribution that worked as guide for the cultural life of [the Puerto Rican] people" and credited it for rescuing "long forgotten values". Writer Emilio S. Belaval assessed that the ICP "met [the standards] of the humanistic program of institutions of its [kind]", crediting Alegría with creating a balance that was "noble" and did not go as far as "deify culture". Composer Amaury Veray discussed the extent of the cultural centers in promoting music, something that he considered had "transcendental importance in the preservation of the Puerto Rican root[s]." Poet Manuel Joglar Cacho credited Alegría's work for the success of the Congresos de Poesía, calling the ICP itself a "very necessary institution". Writer María Teresa Babín States that the ICP was involved in a "crusade in pro of Puerto Rican nationality [in the process] securing the future of Puerto Rico within the hispanic orbit of America" and urged the readers to be proud of the Board of Directors. Painter Rafael Ríos Rey noted "appreciated the [artistic creation] task" of the ICP. Composer Héctor Campos Parsi called it a reflection "of the inherent greatness of [the Puerto Rican people]" and gauged its work as "prodigious". Poet Francisco Matos Paoli argued that the "Puerto Rican homeland was in debt" with the ICP and Alegría, closing by saying that "any grateful man should clap".

Wayne Grover of the National Archives and Records Administration said that "the Government and people of Puerto Rico have reasons to be profoundly proud of what [had] been accomplished in such a short time". Spanish linguist Tomás Navarro Tomás called its first years "astounding", calling it an "example" for other places. Writer Monelisa Pérez Marchand called the ICP the "unwavering watchtower of [Puerto Rican] cultural heritage", which she claimed was achieved without "false patriotism or outrageous chauvinism". Historian Luis M. Díaz responsibilities it for "liberating [the public] from its indifference for all things cultural". Playwright Gerard P. Marín noted that he was initially skeptical of the ICP, but that what had taken place -despite being insufficient for a full assessment- had been positive. Painter Miguel Pou considered that it had filled a void in the education of cultural values. Writer René Marqués discussed the difficulties of engaging in "direct and uninterrupted cultural activity" within the government agency with limited budget and personnel, arguing that it was worthy of praise and also assessing that its work was "valuable, of permanent character". Linguist Rubén del Rosario called the work of the ICP unprecedented in Puerto Rico and evaluated that it had so far avoided politicization or chauvinism, something that he considered worthy of felicitations. Cuban writer Eugenio Florit commented on the ICP's literature, calling it "praise worthy" and stated that work of this kind would "honor any country". Writer Gilberto Concepción de Gracia discussed its "extraordinary work" and the "competence" of Alegría as its director. Architect Santiago Iglesias Jr. assessed that the ICP had coordinated the fine arts and that it "deserve[d] the recognition of all Puerto Rico". Poet Diana Ramírez de Arellano called the promotion of Puerto Rican culture an "unreplacable patriotic work". Historian Adolfo de Hostos credited it with being effective in the diffusion of local history through a number of venues, including the arts and the restoration of Old San Juan. Writer Gustavo Agraít credited Alegría with being able to quell the concerns that emerged when the ICP was created by the government. Architect Carlos R. Sanz called the restoration "gigantic and highly valuable". Writer Emilio J. Pasarell called it a "beginning worthy of praise and promising of a complete task". Writer Juan Martínez Capó considered that the ICP's publishing division was undertaking a work that was overdue in republishing prominent authors. Writer Cesáreo Rosa Nieves emphasized the "deep island roots" of the "nativist efforts" of the ICP, calleing it award-worthy. Wroter Figueroa Barrios considered that the institution was carrying out "services that any government owes to its people". Poet Carmelina Vizcarrondo expressed he faith that the ICP would continue its work within the arts and culture. Spanish linguist Samuel Gili Gaya said that usually cultural institutions took time to produce results, but that somehow the ICP had "surprises with a brilliant harvest" within five years, a sign of the maturity of its collaborators. Writer Luis Hernández Aquino noted that all fields of arts had "been favored" as part of a "wonderful cultural work".

In 1973, several figures gauged the ICP's work as it neared two decades of existence. Spanish musician Pablo Casals called what had been achieved "notable". Historian Arturo Morales Carrión noted that he felt "profound spiritual satisfaction" at what had been achieved. Architect MARIO Buschiazzo noted that the ICP had fulfilled initiatives that had been unsuccessfully proposed to the Junta de Planificación concerning the restoration of Old San Juan. Politician Luis A. Ferré congratulated Alegría for a "magnificent work". Actress Mona Marti emphasized the theater festival as an example of how that field had been advanced by the institution. Writer José Agustín Balseiro noted the struggles that took place in order to restore Old San Juan and praises the work done with popular art. Argentinian professor Aurelio Tanodi said that he was "impressed" with the work done at Old San Juan, which he called a rare sight in the Americas. Poet Juan Antonio Corretjer argued that Alegría's formation was responsible for the work accomplished so far, all the while criticizing the management of the historic buildings prior to the creation of the ICP and expressing concern that as long as sovereignty rested in foreign hands it could be undone. The curator of the Metropolitan Museum of Art Hyatt Mayor called it "a radiant center of culture on the Island", one "of all arts, whose light will radiate all around", further stating that he "admire[d Alegría's] intelligence". Writer Tomás Blanco argued that it deserved "the congratulations and cooperation of any good Puerto Rican". Restoration expert Charles E. Peterson said that he "believed [the restoration of Old San Juan] an outstanding success" product of a "comprehensive and well-thought-out program". Catholic cardinal Luis Aponte Martínez provided "a testimony of admiration and gratitude" to the ICP and Alegría for the work done on historic religious sites at San Juan and San Germán. Inés Mendoza, former teacher of Alegría and wife to governor Muñoz Marín, claimed that the ICP had salvaged the national and cultural heritage of Puerto Rico and brought forth an artistic and cultural renaissance, crediting the director for this success. Archeologist Irving Rouse wrote that the ICP had "achieved more than any other country that [he had] visited and that its work is of the highest quality". Edward P. Alexander of the Colonial Williamsburg site noted that while the work was based on "its authenticity based on historical and archeological research", it also kept San Juan a living city with great cultural relevance", also crediting the "broad programs of your Institute of Puerto Rican Culture [and this] kind of cultural entrepreneurship" with making "Puerto Rico a delightful place in which to live of visit". Henry Allen Moe of the New York State Historical Association credited Alegría with "pre-eminence in the field of cultural activities, including museums".

In 1965, Ursula von Eckardt of the UPR and universalit wrote criticizing the ICP, claiming that it was "fostering a museum-like institution which preserves monuments of 'Puerto Rican' native culture under glass for the self-glorification of a small establishment of "intellectuals" who are worried about their own "identity". In his own words, Mario Vargas Llosa noted that he was impressed by the ICP's restoration of San Juan, hosting Alegría in his La Torre de Babel show in 1981.

== Museums ==
The Instituto operates a number of museums throughout the island. They include:

- Casa Armstrong Poventud - Ponce
- Casa de la Familia Puertorriqueña del Siglo XIX - San Juan
- Casa de la Masacre de Ponce - Ponce
- Casa Jesús T. Piñero - Canóvanas
- Casa Luis Muñoz Rivera - Barranquitas
- Casa Wiechers-Villaronga - Ponce
- Fortín de San Gerónimo - San Juan
- Fuerte Conde Mirasol - Vieques
- Mausoleo Luis Muñoz Rivera - Barranquitas
- Casa Cautiño - Guayama
- Museo de Arte Religioso Santo Domingo de Porta Coeli - San Germán
- Museo Casa Blanca - San Juan
- Museo de la Farmacia - San Juan
- Museo de la Música Puertorriqueña - Ponce
- Museo de Nuestra Raíz Africana - San Juan- closed permanently
- Museo José Celso Barbosa - Bayamón
- Museo y Parque Histórico Ruinas de Caparra - Guaynabo
- Centro Ceremonial Indígena de Caguana - Utuado

== Other institutions ==
The Instituto also owns other properties including the Centro Cultural de Ponce Carmen Solá de Pereira (Ponce Cultural Center).

== See also ==
- Ateneo de Ponce
- Seal of Institute of Puerto Rican Culture (Jorge Soto version)
