= Isabel Gutiérrez del Arroyo =

Puerto Rican historian (1907–2004)

- Born: November 16, 1907; Bayamón, Puerto Rico, U.S.
- Died: January 2004 (aged 96)
- Occupation: Historian
- Awards: Guggenheim Fellowship (1955)

Academic background
- Education: University of Puerto Rico; El Colegio de México
- Thesis: El Reformismo Ilustrado y la emancipación de América: La obra de Pedro Tomás de Córdova (1950)
- Doctoral advisor: Silvio Zavala

Academic work
- Sub-discipline: History of Puerto Rico
- Institutions: University of Puerto Rico, Río Piedras Campus

Isabel Gutiérrez del Arroyo Mimoso (November 16, 1907 – January 2004) was a Puerto Rican historian. Originally a schoolteacher, she obtained degrees from the University of Puerto Rico and El Colegio de México. A 1955 Guggenheim Fellow, she specialized in Puerto Rican history and was a professor at UPR.

== Biography ==
Isabel Gutiérrez del Arroyo Mimoso was born on November 16, 1907, in Bayamón, Puerto Rico, one of four daughters of Isabel (née Mimoso) and Rafael Gutiérrez del Arroyo. She originally worked as a schoolteacher in San Juan and in Caguas. She obtained her BA at the University of Puerto Rico in 1942.

She started working at UPR in the 1940s (Note: Sources vary on the exact date; while Reports of the Secretary and of the Treasurer says that this was 1943, Lizette Cabrera Salcedo instead says 1945.) and became an instructor in the Río Piedras Campus' history department. In 1946, she moved to Mexico for graduate studies at El Colegio de México, where she obtained her master's degree in 1948 and her doctorate in 1950, the latter done at UNAM; Her doctoral thesis was titled El Reformismo Ilustrado y la emancipación de América: La obra de Pedro Tomás de Córdova, and it was published in 1953 as a book, El Reformismo Ilustrado en Puerto Rico.

After briefly returning to Mexico as a United States history professor at Mexico City College and a Colmex researcher (both 1954–1955), she served as historian of the Instituto de Cultura Puertorriqueña from 1956 until 1961. She remained with UPR until 1977 and eventually become a professor emeritus there.

She wrote several academic works on the history of Puerto Rico. While still a graduate student, she published in the multi-author volume Estudios de historiografía americana in 1948. In 1955, she was awarded a Guggenheim Fellowship to study the colonial Mexican intendancy system. She believed researching and preserving Puerto Rican history to be the best way to serve her people. According to Lizette Cabrera Salcedo, "her greatest legacy was becoming a historian of Puerto Rican identity".

She supported the Nationalist Party of Puerto Rico as a militant. When the UPR refused to grant her leave for her doctorate studies without an oath of loyalty required by the Gag Law, they reconsidered after Colmex rector Alfonso Reyes and her doctoral advisor Silvio Zavala personally wrote to UPR rector Jaime Benítez Rexach about the decision. The UPR subjected her to the Gag Law a second time in 1951. A Catholic, she was part of the Third Order of Saint Dominic.

She won the Fundación Puertorriqueña de las Humanidades' Humanist of the Year award in 1985. She was appointed to the Academia Puertorriqueña de Historia as holder of the 16th seat. Her library was donated to UPR's Center for Historical Research in 1997. She died in January 2004.
