= Amaury Veray =

Amaury Veray Torregrosa
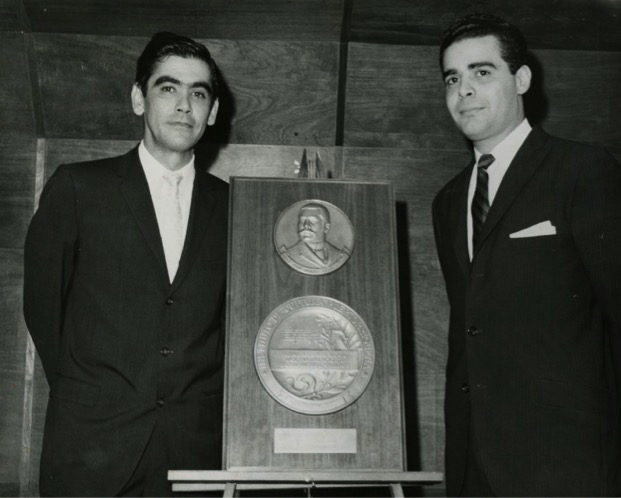
- Amaury Veray (left) poses with fellow pianist Elías López Sobá

Background information
- Born: Amaury Jacinto Veray Torregrosa; June 14, 1922; Yauco, Puerto Rico
- Died: October 30, 1995 (aged 73) Río Piedras, Puerto Rico
- Genres: Classical music; Puerto Rican art music
- Occupations: Composer; pianist; music critic; musicologist; educator
- Instrument: Piano
- Years active: 1940s–1995

Amaury Veray Torregrosa (June 14, 1922 – October 30, 1995) was a Puerto Rican pianist, composer, music critic, and educator from Yauco, Puerto Rico. He is closely associated with Puerto Rican art music in the mid-20th century and is widely known for the Christmas carol "Villancico yaucano".

== Early life ==
Veray was born in Yauco. His parents were Francisco Veray Marín and Margarita Torregrosa. He received early music instruction from Olimpia Morel and later studied with Emilio Bacó Pasarell. He composed early works as a teenager, including "Canción de cuna" and "Estampa fúnebre".

== Education ==
Veray moved to San Juan as a teenager and studied at the University of Puerto Rico, completing a Bachelor of Arts with a specialty in languages in 1943. He also taught a music appreciation course for adults during this period.

He later studied music in the continental United States, including at the New England Conservatory, graduating with honours in 1949 with a focus on theory and composition. In 1957, he received the Pablo Casals Scholarship to pursue advanced study in Italy at the Accademia Nazionale di Santa Cecilia in Rome, where he continued composition studies with Ildebrando Pizzetti.

== Career ==
After returning to Puerto Rico, Veray worked as a music educator and held roles connected to cultural institutions and public programmes. He taught and also contributed to the development and documentation of Puerto Rican music in institutional settings.

He is credited with organising the Archivo de Música y Partituras at the Instituto de Cultura Puertorriqueña and contributing research and writing for recordings produced by the institution. Coverage has also described him as a key figure in archival efforts tied to Puerto Rico's cultural heritage.

== Works ==
Veray composed in several formats, including piano works, chamber music, and staged works. He is credited with compositions such as "El niño de Aguadilla" (1954), "Sonata para violín y piano" (1959), and "Canto a Filí Melé" (1959), as well as ballets including "La encantada" (1957) and "Cuando las mujeres" (1957).

He also wrote incidental music for theatre, including productions of works by René Marqués and Luis Rafael Sánchez. His best-known piece is the Christmas carol "Villancico yaucano," which sources describe as a major work in Puerto Rican music and link to his long-term influence as a composer and writer.

== Death and legacy ==
Veray died on October 30, 1995, in Río Piedras. He was buried at the Yauco Old Municipal Cemetery in Yauco, Puerto Rico. His legacy is reflected in ongoing cultural commentary and institutional projects that highlight his role as a composer, educator, and organiser of music archives in Puerto Rico.

There is a street in the town of Yauco, that is named in his honor.

Until recently, there was a museum in the town of Yauco with his name, but the museum has been closed since the earthquake. The museum is located in the house which Veray was born in. The house was built by his father, a dentist, in 1919.
