= History of Puerto Rico =

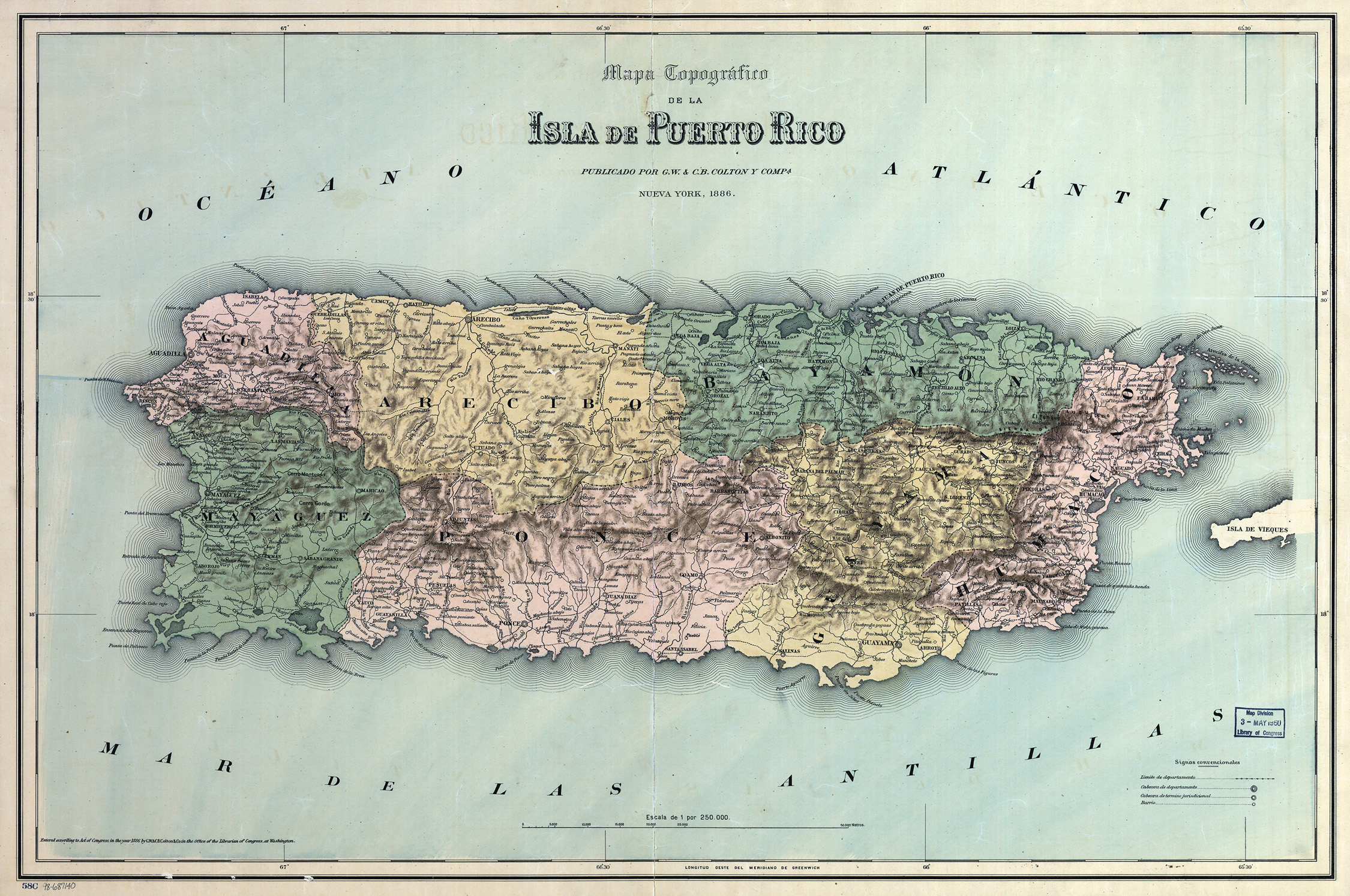
Map of the departments of Puerto Rico during Spanish provincial times (1886).

The history of Puerto Rico began with the settlement of the Ortoiroid people before 430 BCE. At the time of Christopher Columbus's arrival in the New World in 1493, the dominant Indigenous culture was that of the Taíno. The Taíno people's numbers went dangerously low during the later half of the 16th century because of new infectious diseases, other exploitation by Spanish settlers, and warfare.

Located in the northeastern Caribbean, Puerto Rico formed a key part of the Spanish Empire from the early years of the exploration, conquest and colonization of the New World. The island was a major military post during many wars between Spain and other European powers for control of the region in the 16th, 17th, and 18th centuries. In 1593, Portuguese soldiers, sent from Lisbon by order of Phillip II, composed the first garrison of the San Felipe del Morro fortress in San Juan. Some brought their wives, while others married Puerto Rican women, and today there are many Puerto Rican families with Portuguese last names. The smallest of the Greater Antilles, Puerto Rico was a stepping-stone in the passage from Europe to Cuba, Mexico, Central America, and the northern territories of South America. Throughout most of the 19th century until the conclusion of the Spanish–American War, Puerto Rico and Cuba were the last two Spanish colonies in the New World; they served as Spain's final outposts in a strategy to regain control of the American continents. Realizing that it was in danger of losing its two remaining Caribbean territories, the Spanish Crown revived the Royal Decree of Graces of 1815. The decree was printed in Spanish, English and French in order to attract Europeans, with the hope that the independence movements would lose their popularity and strength with the arrival of new settlers. Free land was offered to those who wanted to populate the islands on the condition that they swear their loyalty to the Spanish Crown and allegiance to the Roman Catholic Church.

In 1898, during the Spanish–American War, Puerto Rico was invaded and subsequently became a possession of the United States. The first years of the 20th century were marked by the struggle to obtain greater democratic rights from the United States.

The Foraker Act of 1900 established a civil government, ending rule by American generals and the Department of War. A United States Supreme Court ruling Ortega v. Lara, 202 U.S. 339, 342 (1906), (Note: Text of Ortega v. Lara, 202 U.S. 339, 342 (1906) is available from: Cornell Findlaw Internet Archive (docket files) Justia OpenJurist) involving the Foraker Act and referring to the island as "the acquired country", soon affirmed that the Constitution of the United States applied within its territory and that any domestic Puerto Rican laws which did not conflict with the United States Constitution remained in force. The Jones Act of 1917, which made Puerto Ricans U.S. citizens, paved the way for the drafting of Puerto Rico's Constitution and its approval by Congress and Puerto Rican voters in 1952. However, the political status of Puerto Rico, an unincorporated U.S. territory, is an ongoing debate.

== Pre-colonial (before 1508) ==
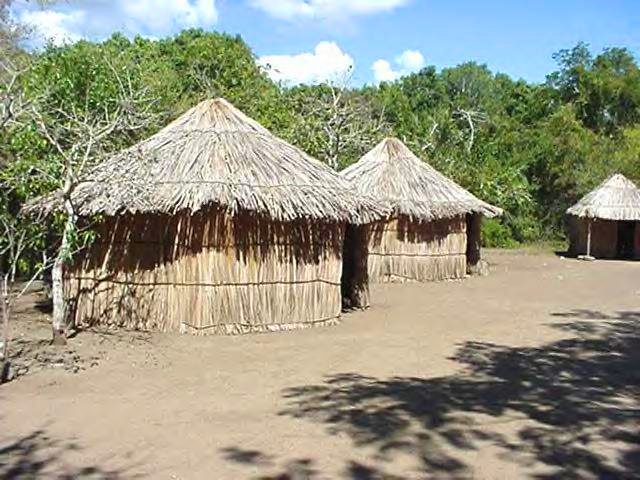
Taíno village at Tibes Indigenous Ceremonial Center in Ponce, Puerto Rico.

The settlement of Puerto Rico began with the establishment of the Ortoiroid culture from the Orinoco region in South America. Some scholars suggest that their settlement dates back 4000 years. An archeological dig at the island of Vieques in 1990 found the remains of what is believed to be an Ortoiroid man (named Puerto Ferro man) which was dated to around 2000 BCE. The Ortoiroid were displaced by the Saladoid, a culture from the same region that arrived on the island between 430 and 250 BCE.

Between the seventh and 11th centuries, the Arawak are thought to have settled the island. During this time the Taíno culture developed, and by approximately 1000 CE, it had become dominant. Taíno culture has been traced to the village of Saladero at the basin of the Orinoco River in Venezuela; the Taíno migrated to Puerto Rico by crossing the Lesser Antilles.

At the time of Columbus' arrival, an estimated 30 to 60 thousand Taíno Amerindians, led by the cacique, 'chief' Agüeybaná, inhabited the island. They called it Borikén, "the great land of the valiant and noble Lord". The natives lived in small villages led by a cacique and subsisted on hunting, fishing and gathering of indigenous cassava root and fruit. When the Spaniards arrived in 1493, the Taíno were already in conflict with the raiding Carib, who were moving up the Antilles chain. The Taíno domination of the island was nearing its end, and the Spanish arrival marked the beginning of their believed extinction. However, due to the discovery of pre-contact skeletal remains and subsequent DNA testing, we now know the Taino people live on in their descendants. Their culture, however, remains part of that of contemporary Puerto Rico. Musical instruments such as maracas and güiro, the hammock, and words such as Mayagüez, Arecibo, iguana, Caguas, barbecue (barbacoa) and hurricane (huracán) are examples of the legacy left by the Taíno.

== Spanish Empire rule (1508–1898) ==
=== Beginning of colonization ===
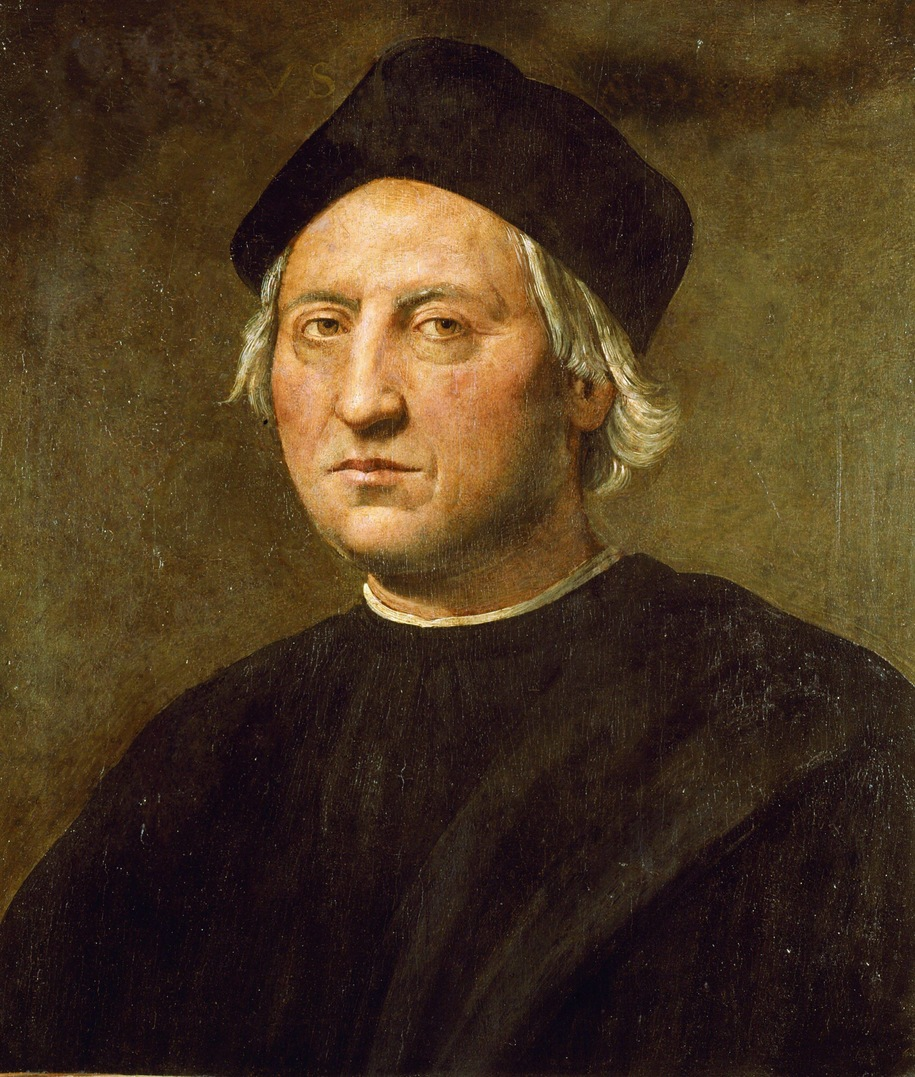
Christopher Columbus, the explorer credited with the European discovery of Puerto Rico.

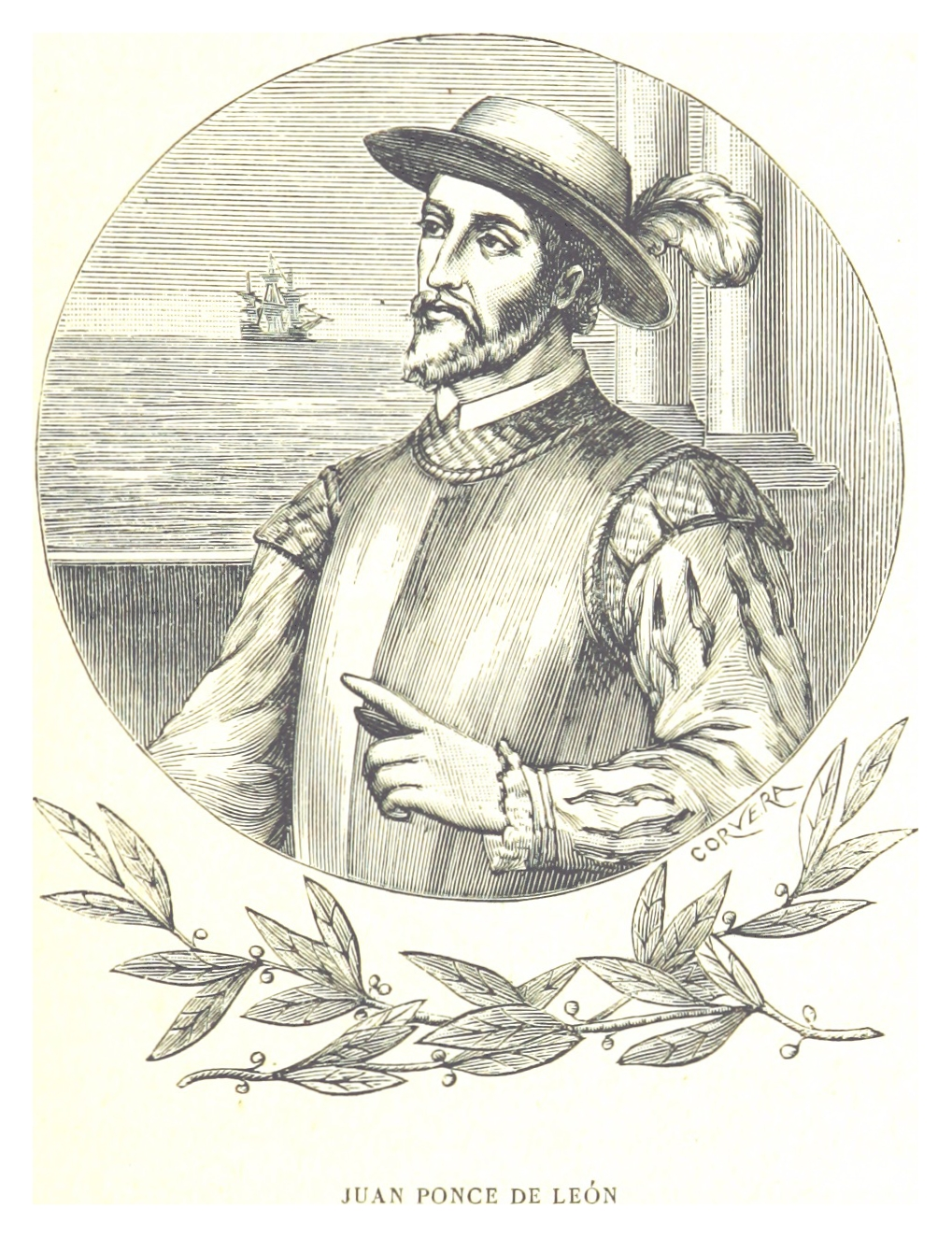
Juan Ponce de León (Santervás de Campos, Valladolid, Spain), was the first governor of Puerto Rico. His grandson Juan Ponce de Leon II was the first indigenous governor of Puerto Rico.

On 24 September 1493, Christopher Columbus set sail on his second voyage with 17 ships and 1,200 to 1,500 soldiers from Cádiz. On 19 November 1493, he landed on the island, naming it San Juan Bautista in honor of Saint John the Baptist. The island remained explored and unsettled until the first European settlement, Caparra, was founded on 8 August 1508 by Juan Ponce de León, a lieutenant under Columbus, who was greeted by the Taíno Cacique Agüeybaná and later became the first governor of the island. Ponce de Leon was actively involved in the Hatuey (Jaragua) massacre of 1503 in Haiti on Hispaniola island. In 1508, Ponce de Leon was chosen by the Spanish Crown to lead the conquest and enslaving of the Taíno Indians for gold mining operations. The following year, the colony was abandoned in favor of a nearby islet on the coast, named Puerto Rico (Rich Port), which had a suitable harbor. In 1511, a second settlement, San Germán was established in the southwestern part of the island. During the 1520s, the island took the name of Puerto Rico while the port became San Juan.

The Spanish settlers established the first encomienda system, under which natives were distributed to Spanish officials to be used as slave labor. On 27 December 1512, under pressure from the Roman Catholic Church, Ferdinand II of Aragon issued the Burgos' Laws, which modified the encomienda into a system called repartimento, aimed at ending the exploitation. The laws prohibited the use of any form of punishment toward the indigenous people, regulated their work hours, pay, hygiene, and care, and ordered them to be catechized. But before the laws were promulgated, in 1511 the Taínos revolted against the Spanish; cacique Urayoán, as planned by Agüeybaná II, ordered his warriors to drown the Spanish soldier Diego Salcedo to determine whether the Spaniards were immortal. After drowning Salcedo, they kept watch over his body for three days to confirm his death. The revolt was easily crushed by Ponce de León and within a few decades much of the native population had been decimated by disease, violence, and a high occurrence of suicide. As a result, Taíno culture, language, and traditions were generally destroyed, and were declared to have "vanished" 50 years after Christopher Columbus arrived. Since the early 21st century, efforts have been made to revive and rebuild Taíno culture.

The Roman Catholic Church, realizing the opportunity to expand its influence, also participated in colonizing the island. On 8 August 1511, Pope Julius II established three dioceses in the New World, one in Puerto Rico and two on the island of Hispaniola under the archbishop of Seville. The Canon of Salamanca, Alonso Manso, was appointed bishop of the Puerto Rican diocese. On 26 September 1512, before his arrival on the island, the first school of advanced studies was established by the bishop. Taking possession in 1513, he became the first bishop to arrive in the Americas. Puerto Rico would also become the first ecclesiastical headquarters in the New World during the reign of Pope Leo X and the general headquarters of the Spanish Inquisition in the New World.

As part of the colonization process, African slaves were brought to the island in 1513. Following the decline of the Taíno population, more slaves were brought to Puerto Rico; however, the number of slaves on the island paled in comparison to those in neighboring islands. Also, early in the colonization of Puerto Rico, attempts were made to wrest control of Puerto Rico from Spain. The Caribs, a raiding tribe of the Caribbean, attacked Spanish settlements along the banks of the Daguao and Macao rivers in 1514 and again in 1521 but each time they were repelled by Spanish firepower. However, these would not be the last attempts at control of Puerto Rico. The European powers quickly realized the potential of the newly discovered lands and attempted to gain control of them.

The first school in Spanish-controlled Puerto Rico was the Escuela de Gramatica (Grammar School). The school was established by Bishop Alonso Manso in 1513, in the area where the Cathedral of San Juan was to be constructed. The school was free of charge and the courses taught were Latin language, literature, history, science, art, philosophy, and theology.

Puerto Rico became a part of New Spain upon its establishment in 1521. The island became a Captaincy General in 1580.

=== European powers fight over the island ===
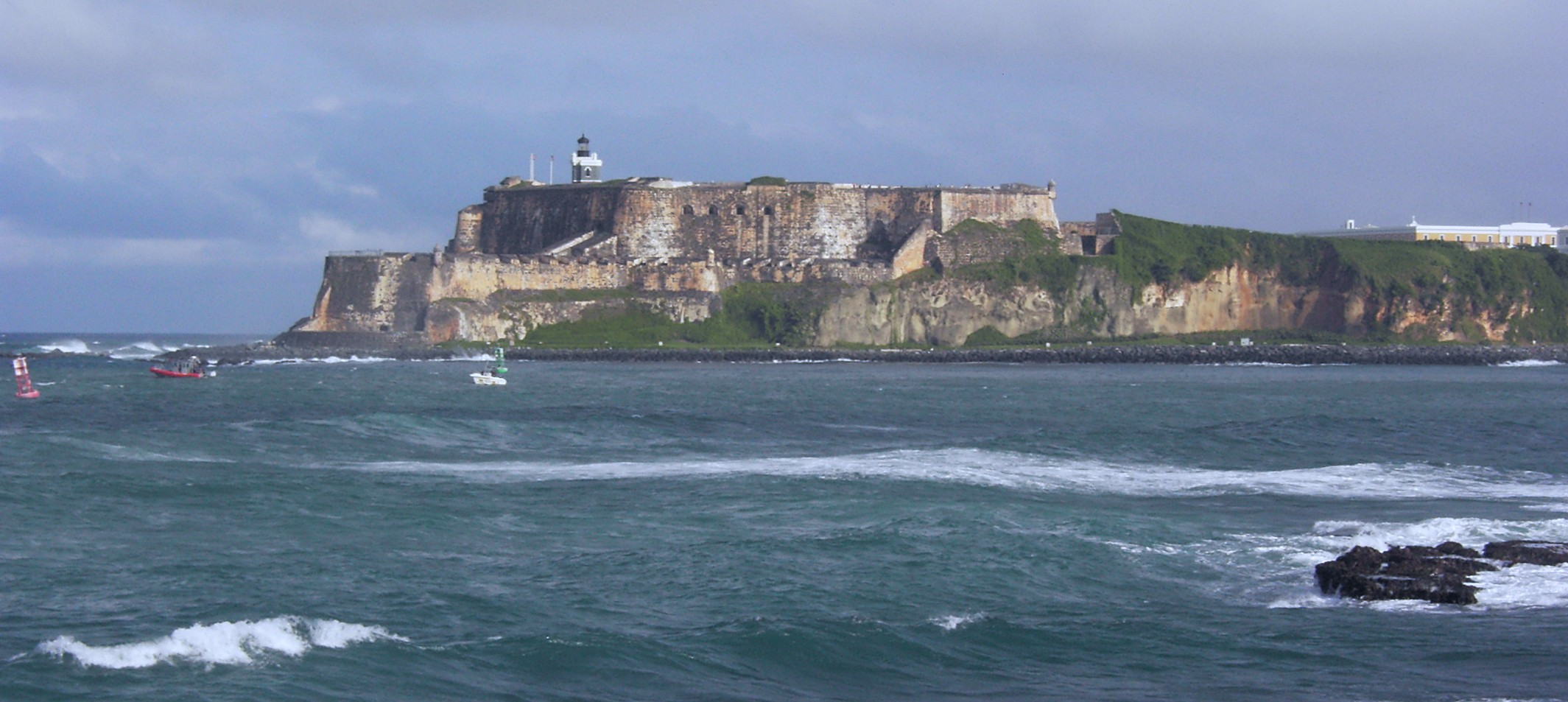
View across the Bay of San Juan of Fort San Felipe del Morro

Sparked by the possibility of immense wealth, many European powers made attempts to wrest control of the Americas from Spain in the 16th, 17th and 18th centuries. Success in invasion varied, and ultimately all Spanish opponents failed to maintain permanent control of the island. In 1528, the French, recognizing the strategic value of Puerto Rico, sacked and burned the southwestern town of San Germán. They also destroyed many of the island's first settlements, including Guánica, Sotomayor, Daguao and Loíza before the local militia forced them to retreat. The only settlement that remained was the capital, San Juan. French corsairs would again sack San Germán in 1538 and 1554.

Spain, determined to defend its possession, began the fortification of the inlet of San Juan in the early 16th century. In 1532, construction of the first fortifications began with La Fortaleza, 'the Fortress' near the entrance to San Juan Bay. Seven years later the construction of massive defenses around San Juan began, including Fort San Felipe del Morro astride the entrance to San Juan Bay. Later, Fort San Cristóbal and Fortín de San Gerónimo—built with a financial subsidy from the Mexican mines—garrisoned troops and defended against land attacks. In 1587, engineers Juan de Tejada and Juan Bautista Antonelli redesigned Fort San Felipe del Morro; these changes endure. Politically, Puerto Rico was reorganized in 1580 into a captaincy general to provide for more autonomy and quick administrative responses to military threats.

On 22 November 1595, English privateer Sir Francis Drake—with 27 vessels and 2,500 troops—sailed into San Juan Bay intending to sack the settlement. However, they were unable to overcome the Spanish forces entrenched in the forts. Knowing Drake had failed to overcome the city's defenses by sea, on 15 June 1598, the Tudor Navy, led by George Clifford, landed troops from 21 ships to the east in Santurce. Clifford and his men came under heavy Spanish fire while attempting to cross the San Antonio bridge (from an area known today as Condado) into the islet of San Juan. Nonetheless, the English captured the island and held it for several months. They were forced to abandon the island owing to an outbreak of dysentery among their troops. The following year Spain sent soldiers, cannons, and a new governor, Alonso de Mercado, to rebuild the city of San Juan.

The 17th and 18th centuries saw more attacks on the island. On 25 September 1625, the Dutch, under the leadership of Boudewijn Hendricksz (Balduino Enrico), attacked San Juan, besieging Fort San Felipe del Morro and La Fortaleza. Residents fled the city but the Spanish, led by Governor Juan de Haro, were able to repel the Dutch troops from Fort San Felipe del Morro. The fortification of San Juan continued; in 1634, Philip IV of Spain fortified Fort San Cristóbal, along with six fortresses linked by a line of sandstone walls surrounding the city. In 1702, the English launch an expedition to capture the town of Arecibo, located on the north coast, west of San Juan, with no success. In 1797, the French and Spanish declared war on Great Britain. The British attempted again to capture the island, invading San Juan with an invasion force of 7,000 troops and an armada consisting of 64 ships under the command of General Ralph Abercromby. Captain General Don Ramón de Castro and his army successfully repulsed the British, who withdrew.

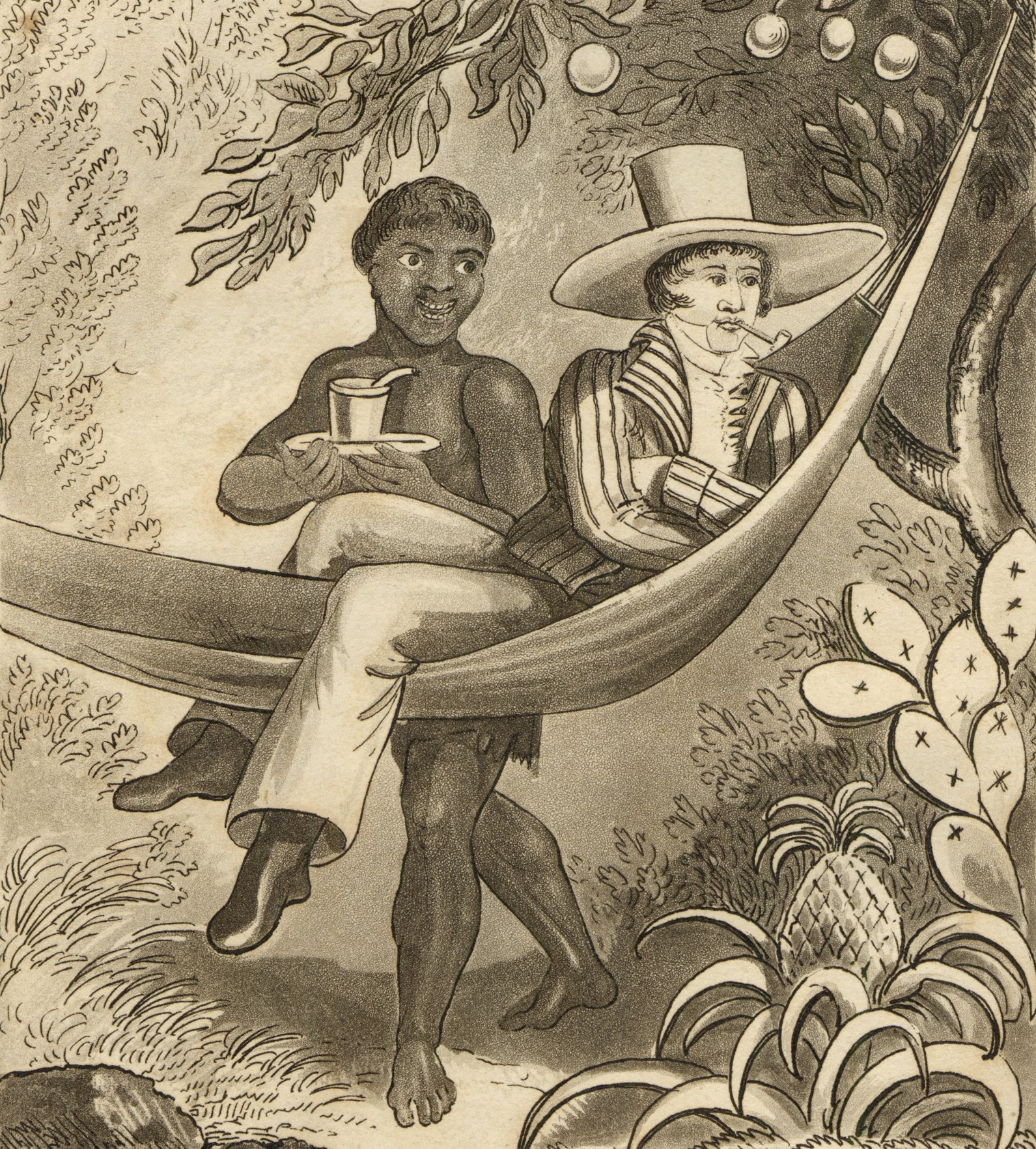
Spanish Planter of Puerto Rico with House Slave, ca. 1808

Amidst the constant attacks, the first threads of Puerto Rican society emerged. A 1765 census conducted by Lt. General Alejandro O'Reilly showed a total population of 44,883, of which 5,037 (11.2%) were slaves, a low percentage compared to the other Spanish colonies in the Caribbean. In 1786 the first comprehensive history of Puerto Rico—Historia Geográfica, Civil y Política de Puerto Rico by Fray Iñigo Abbad y Lasierra—was published in Madrid, documenting the history of Puerto Rico from the time of Columbus' landing in 1493 until 1783. The book also presents a first hand account of Puerto Rican identity, including music, clothing, personality and nationality.

Puerto Rico became an intendancy in 1784.

=== Early 19th century ===
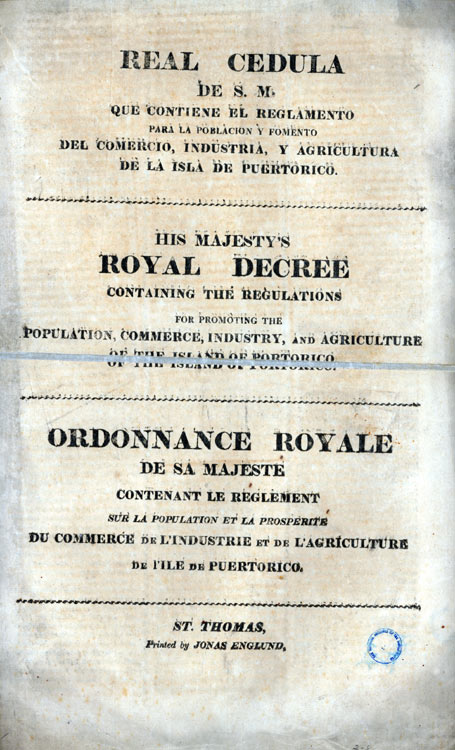
Royal Cédula of Graces, 1815, which granted legal entry of some foreigners to Puerto Rico.

The 19th century brought many changes to Puerto Rico, both political and social. In 1809, the Spanish government, in opposition to Napoleon, was convened in Cádiz in southern Spain. While still swearing allegiance to the king, the Supreme Central Junta invited voting representatives from the colonies. Ramón Power y Giralt was nominated as the local delegate to the Cortes of Cádiz, which served as a parliamentary Regency after Ferdinand VII was deposed by Napoleon. The Ley Power ("the Power Act") soon followed, which designated five ports for free commerce—Fajardo, Mayagüez, Aguadilla, Cabo Rojo and Ponce—and established economic reforms with the goal of developing a more efficient economy. In 1812, the Cádiz Constitution was adopted, dividing Spain and its territories into provinces, each with a local corporation or council to promote its prosperity and defend its interests; this granted Puerto Ricans conditional Spanish citizenship.

On 10 August 1815, the Royal Cédula of Grace was issued, allowing some foreigners to enter Puerto Rico (including French refugees from Hispaniola), and opening the port to trade with nations allied to Spain. This was the beginning of agriculture-based economic growth, with sugar, tobacco, and coffee being the main products. However, and as it is shown as published, in the face page of the original Spanish Royal Cédula of Graces of 1815, the name of Puerto Rico was translated into English as Porto Rico by the Spanish civil authorities overseeing the Royal Cédula's publication. Besides, the term Real Cédula was also translated as Royal Decree in that same original publication, although a Spanish royal cédula was better defined as a royal patent or grant. Regardless, the Royal Cédula also granted free land to any foreign immigrant coming from countries allied to Spain who swore loyalty to the Spanish Crown and allegiance to the Roman Catholic Church. Thousands of families from all regions of Spain (particularly Asturias, Catalonia, Majorca and Galicia), and from Germany, Corsica, Ireland, France, Portugal, the Canary Islands and other locations, escaping from harsh economic times in Europe and lured by the offer of free land, soon immigrated to Puerto Rico. However, these small gains in autonomy and rights were short lived. After the fall of Napoleon, absolute power returned to Spain, which revoked the Cádiz Constitution and reinstated Puerto Rico to its former condition as a colony, subject to the unrestricted power of the Spanish monarch. Nevertheless, the integration of immigrants into the Puerto Rican culture and other events changed Puerto Rican society.

On 25 June 1835, Queen María Cristina abolished the slave trade to Spanish colonies. Yet, this would not be formally abolished in Puerto Rico until 1873. In 1851, Governor Juan de la Pezuela Cevallos founded the Royal Academy of Belles Letters. The academy licensed primary school teachers, formulated school methods, and held literary contests that promoted the intellectual and literary progress of the island.

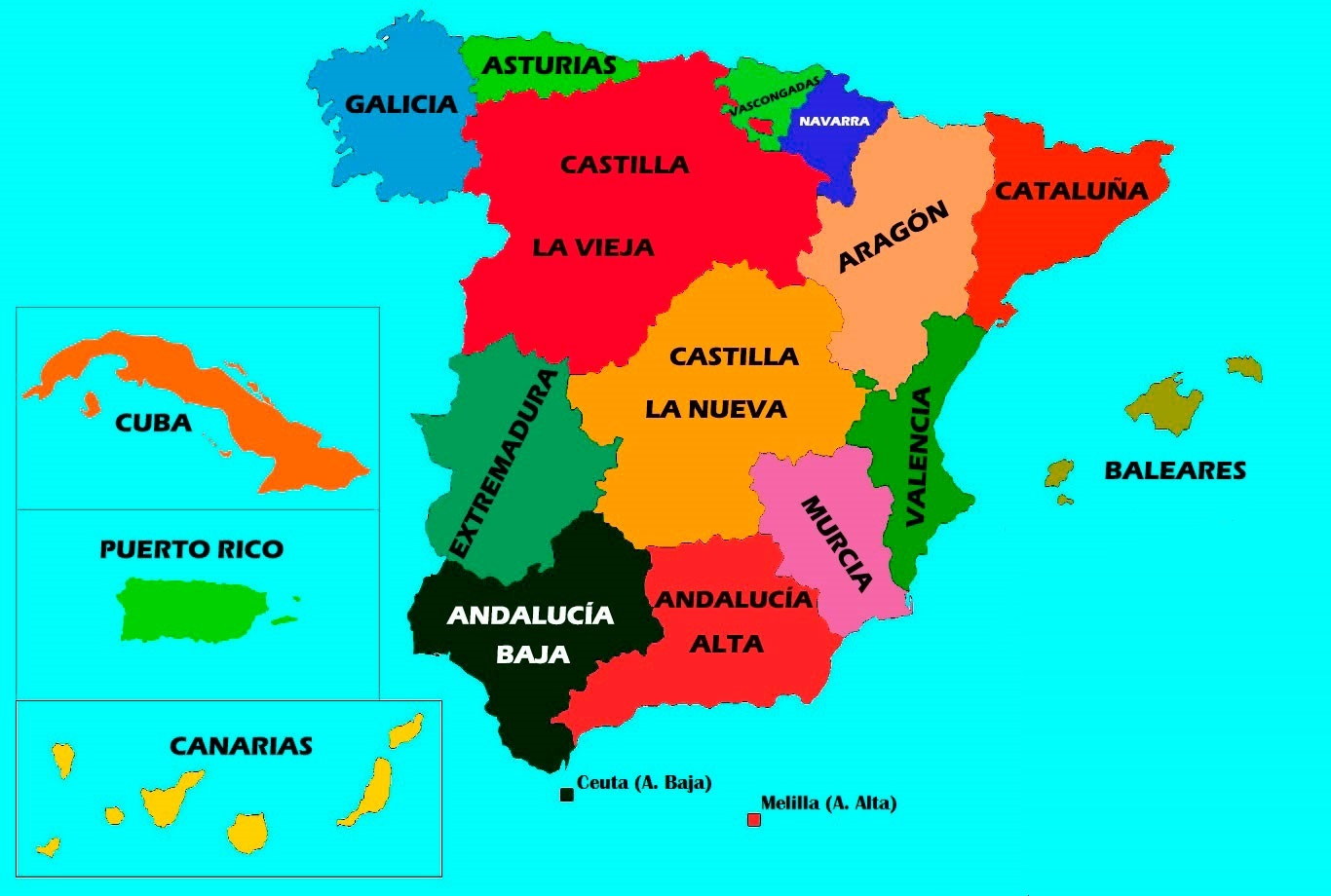
States proposed in the Spanish Draft Federal Constitution of 1873, among which Puerto Rico was included.

In 1858, Samuel Morse introduced wired communication to Latin America when he established a telegraph system in Puerto Rico. Morse's oldest daughter Susan Walker Morse (1821–1885), would often visit her uncle Charles Pickering Walker who owned the Hacienda Concordia in the town of Guayama. Morse, who often spent his winters at the Hacienda with his daughter and son-in-law, who lived and owned the Hacienda Henriqueta, set a two-mile telegraph line connecting his son-in-law's hacienda to their house in the town of Arroyo. The line was inaugurated on 1 March 1859, in a ceremony flanked by the Spanish and American flags. The first lines that Morse transmitted by telegraph that day in Puerto Rico were:

Puerto Rico, beautiful jewel! When you are linked with the other jewels of the Antilles in the necklace of the world's telegraph, yours will not shine less brilliantly in the crown of your Queen!

=== Slave revolts and abolition ===
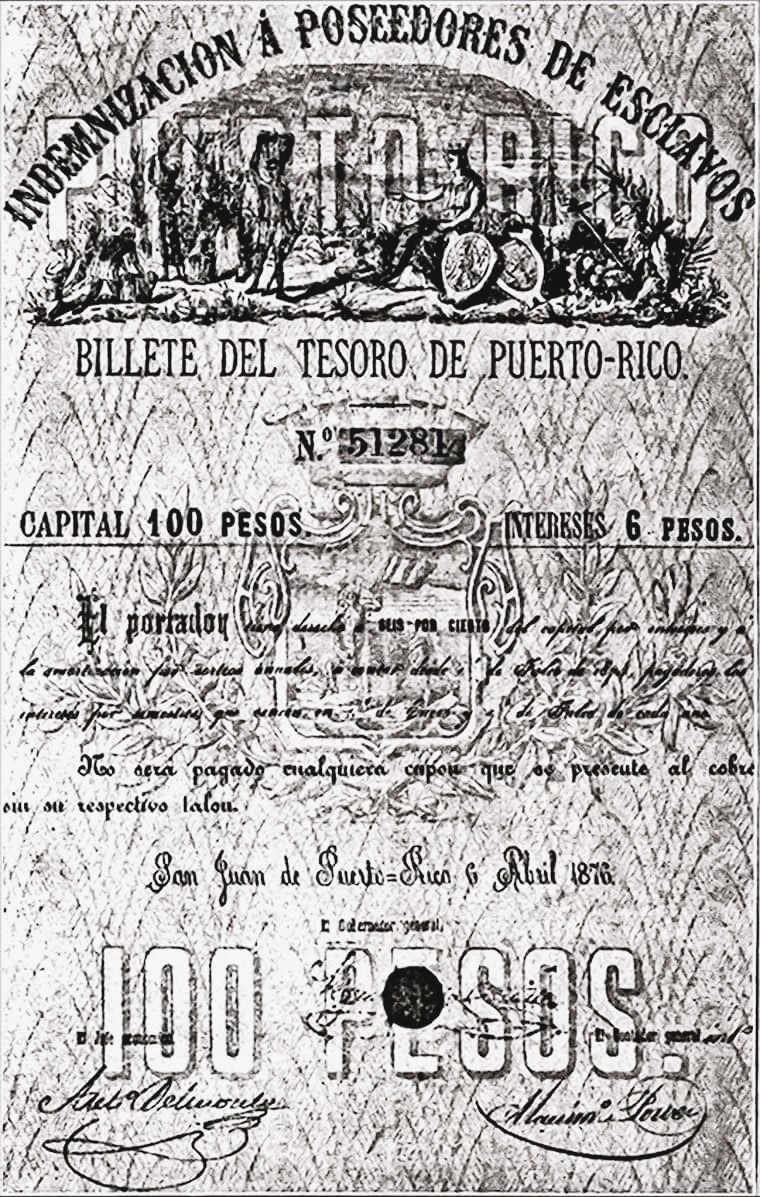
1876 indemnity bond paid as compensation to former Puerto-Rico owners of freed slaves

This period also saw repeated slave revolts. Most were minor, but the revolt planned and organized by Marcos Xiorro in 1821 was the most significant. Even though the conspiracy was unsuccessful, he achieved legendary status among the slaves and is still part of Puerto Rico's folklore.

Spain did not abolish slavery in Puerto Rico until 1873, at the very beginning of the First Republic. In reality, slaves had to enter into a three-year contract with their masters, who would be compensated under the supervision of an assembly of notables and landowners. Freedmen only took possession of their rights after five years.

=== Struggle for sovereignty ===
The last half of the 19th century was marked by the Puerto Rican struggle for sovereignty. A census conducted in 1860 revealed a population of 583,308. Of these, 300,406 (51.5%) were white and 282,775 (48.5%) were persons of color, the latter including people of primarily African heritage, mulattos and mestizos. The majority of the population in Puerto Rico was illiterate (83.7%) and lived in poverty, and the agricultural industry—at the time, the main source of income—was hampered by lack of road infrastructure, adequate tools and equipment, and natural disasters, including hurricanes and droughts. The economy also suffered from increasing tariffs and taxes imposed by the Spanish Crown. Furthermore, Spain had begun to exile or jail any person who called for liberal reforms.

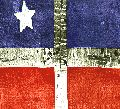
The original Lares revolutionary flag. The first "Puerto Rican Flag" used in the unsuccessful Grito de Lares (Lares Uprising).

On 23 September 1868, hundreds of men and women in the town of Lares—stricken by poverty and politically estranged from Spain—revolted against Spanish rule, seeking Puerto Rican independence. The Grito de Lares ("Lares Cry" or "Lares Uprising") was planned by a group led by Dr. Ramón Emeterio Betances, at the time exiled to the Dominican Republic, and Segundo Ruiz Belvis. Dr. Betances had founded the Comité Revolucionario de Puerto Rico (Revolutionary Committee of Puerto Rico) in January 1868. The most important figures in the uprising were Manuel Rojas, Mathias Brugman, Mariana Bracetti, Francisco Ramírez Medina and Lola Rodríguez de Tió. The uprising, although significant, was quickly controlled by Spanish authorities.

Following the Grito de Lares revolt, political and social reforms occurred toward the end of the 19th century. On 4 June 1870, due to the efforts of Román Baldorioty de Castro, Luis Padial and Julio Vizcarrondo, the Moret Law was approved, giving freedom to slaves born after 17 September 1868, or over 60 years old; on 22 March 1873, the Spanish National Assembly officially abolished, with a few special clauses, slavery in Puerto Rico.

In 1870, the first political organizations on the island were formed as two factions emerged. The Traditionalists, known as the Partido Liberal Conservador, 'Liberal Conservative Party' were led by José R. Fernández, Pablo Ubarri and Francisco Paula Acuña and advocated assimilation into the political party system of Spain. The Autonomists, known as the Partido Liberal Reformista, 'Liberal Reformist Party' were led by Román Baldorioty de Castro, José Julián Acosta, Nicolás Aguayo and Pedro Gerónimo Goico and advocated decentralization away from Spanish control. Both parties would later change their names, to Partido Incondicional Español, 'Unconditional Spanish Party' and Partido Federal Reformista, 'Reformist Federal Party' respectively. In March 1887, the Partido Federal Reformista was reformed and named the Partido Autonomista Puertorriqueño, 'Puerto Rican Autonomist Party'; it tried to create a political and legal identity for Puerto Rico while emulating Spain in all political matters. It was led by Román Baldorioty de Castro, José Celso Barbosa, Rosendo Matienzo Cintrón and Luis Muñoz Rivera.

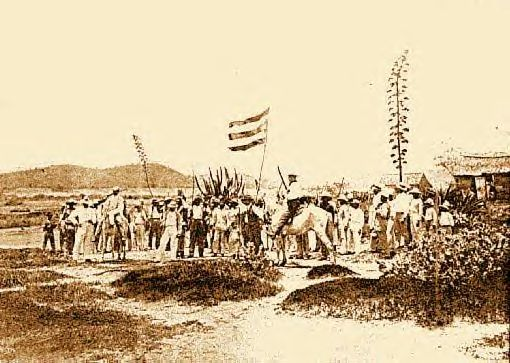
Flag flown by Fidel Vélez and his men during the "Intentona de Yauco" revolt.

Leaders of "El Grito de Lares", who were in exile in New York City, joined the Puerto Rican Revolutionary Committee, founded on 8 December 1895, and continued their quest for Puerto Rican independence. On 24 March 1897, Antonio Mattei Lluberas and the local leaders of the independence movement of the town of Yauco, organized another uprising, which became known as the "Intentona de Yauco". This was the first time that the current Puerto Rican flag was unfurled in Puerto Rican soil. The local conservative political factions, which believed that such an attempt would be a threat to their struggle for autonomy, opposed such an action. Rumors of the planned event spread to the local Spanish authorities who acted swiftly and put an end to what would be the last major uprising in the island to Spanish colonial rule.

The struggle for autonomy came close to achieving its goal on 25 November 1897, when the Carta Autonómica (Charter of Autonomy), which conceded political and administrative autonomy to the island, was approved in Spain. In the past 400-plus years, after centuries of colonial rule, Práxedes Mateo Sagasta, the Prime Minister of Spain granted the island an autonomous government on 25 November 1897, in the empire's legislative body in Cádiz, Spain, and trade was opened up with the United States and European colonies. The charter maintained a governor appointed by Spain, who held the power to veto any legislative decision he disagreed with, and a partially elected parliamentary structure. That same year, the Partido Autonomista Ortodoxo, 'Orthodox Autonomist Party', led by José Celso Barbosa and Manuel Fernández Juncos, was founded. On 9 February 1898, the new government officially began. Local legislature set its own budget and taxes. They accepted or rejected commercial treaties concluded by Spain. In February 1898, Governor General Manuel Macías inaugurated the new government of Puerto Rico under the Autonomous Charter, which gave town councils complete autonomy in local matters. Subsequently, the governor had no authority to intervene in civil and political matters unless authorized to do so by the Cabinet. General elections were held in March and on 17 July 1898, Puerto Rico's autonomous government began to function, but not for long.

=== Invasion of 1898 ===
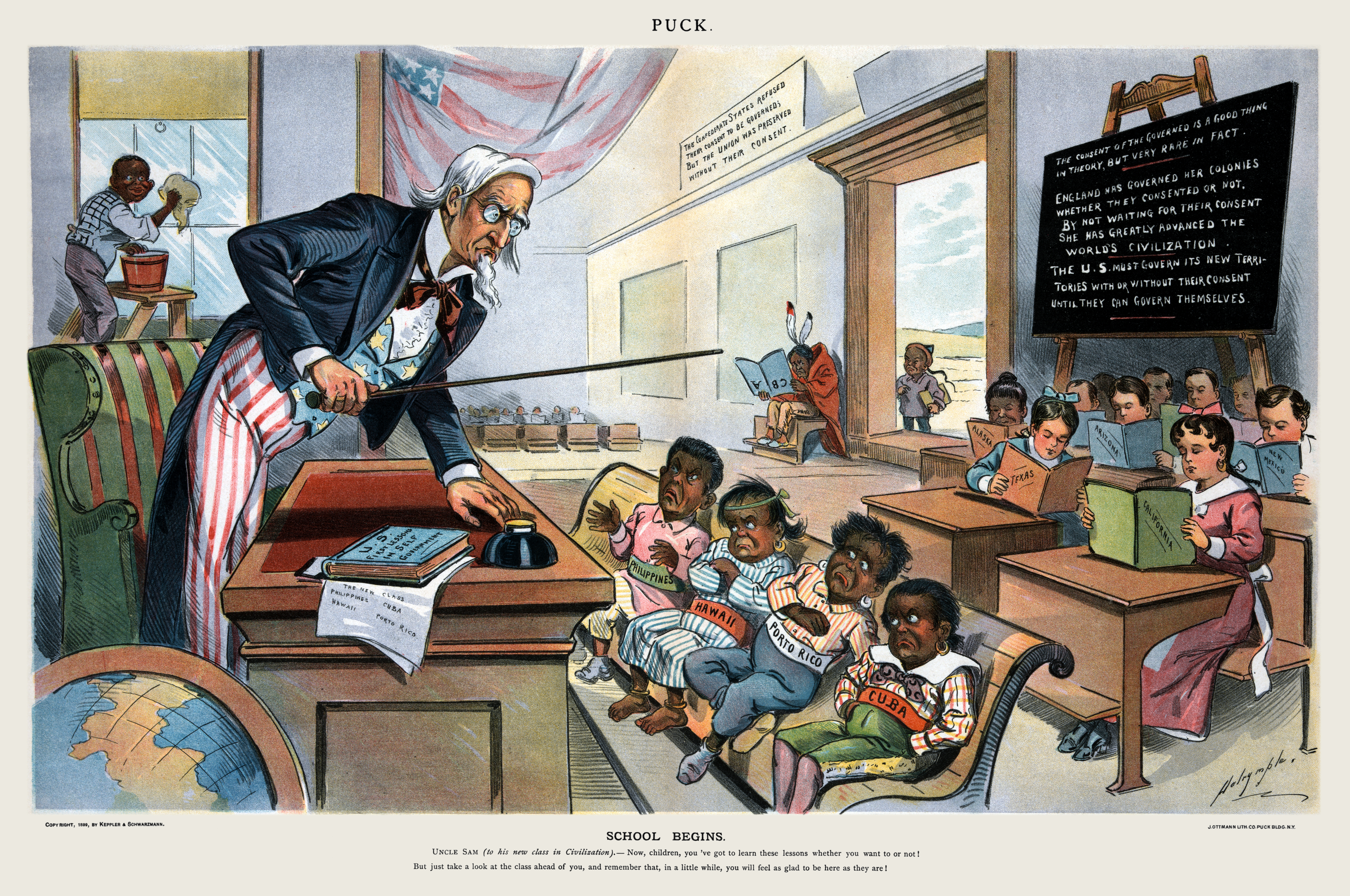
An 1899, caricature by Louis Dalrymple (1866–1905), showing Uncle Sam harshly lecturing four black children labelled Philippines, Hawaii, Puerto Rico and Cuba

In 1890, Captain Alfred Thayer Mahan, a member of the Navy War Board and leading U.S. strategic thinker, wrote a book titled The Influence of Sea Power upon History in which he argued for the creation of a large and powerful navy modeled after the Royal Navy. Part of his strategy called for the acquisition of colonies in the Caribbean Sea; these would serve as coaling and naval stations, as well as strategic points of defense after construction of a canal in the Isthmus. Since 1894, the Naval War College had been formulating plans for war with Spain and by 1896, the Office of Naval Intelligence had prepared a plan which included military operations in Puerto Rican waters.

On 10 March 1898, Dr. Julio J. Henna and Roberto H. Todd Wells, leaders of the Puerto Rican section of the Cuban Revolutionary Party, began to correspond with United States President William McKinley and the United States Senate in hopes that they would consider including Puerto Rico in the intervention planned for Cuba. Henna and Todd also provided the US government with information about the Spanish military presence on the island. On 24 April, Spanish Minister of Defense Segismundo Bermejo sent instructions to Spanish Admiral Cervera to proceed with his fleet from Cape Verde to the Caribbean, Cuba and Puerto Rico. In May, Lt. Henry H. Whitney of the United States Fourth Artillery was sent to Puerto Rico on a reconnaissance mission. He provided maps and information on the Spanish military forces to the US government that would be useful for an invasion.

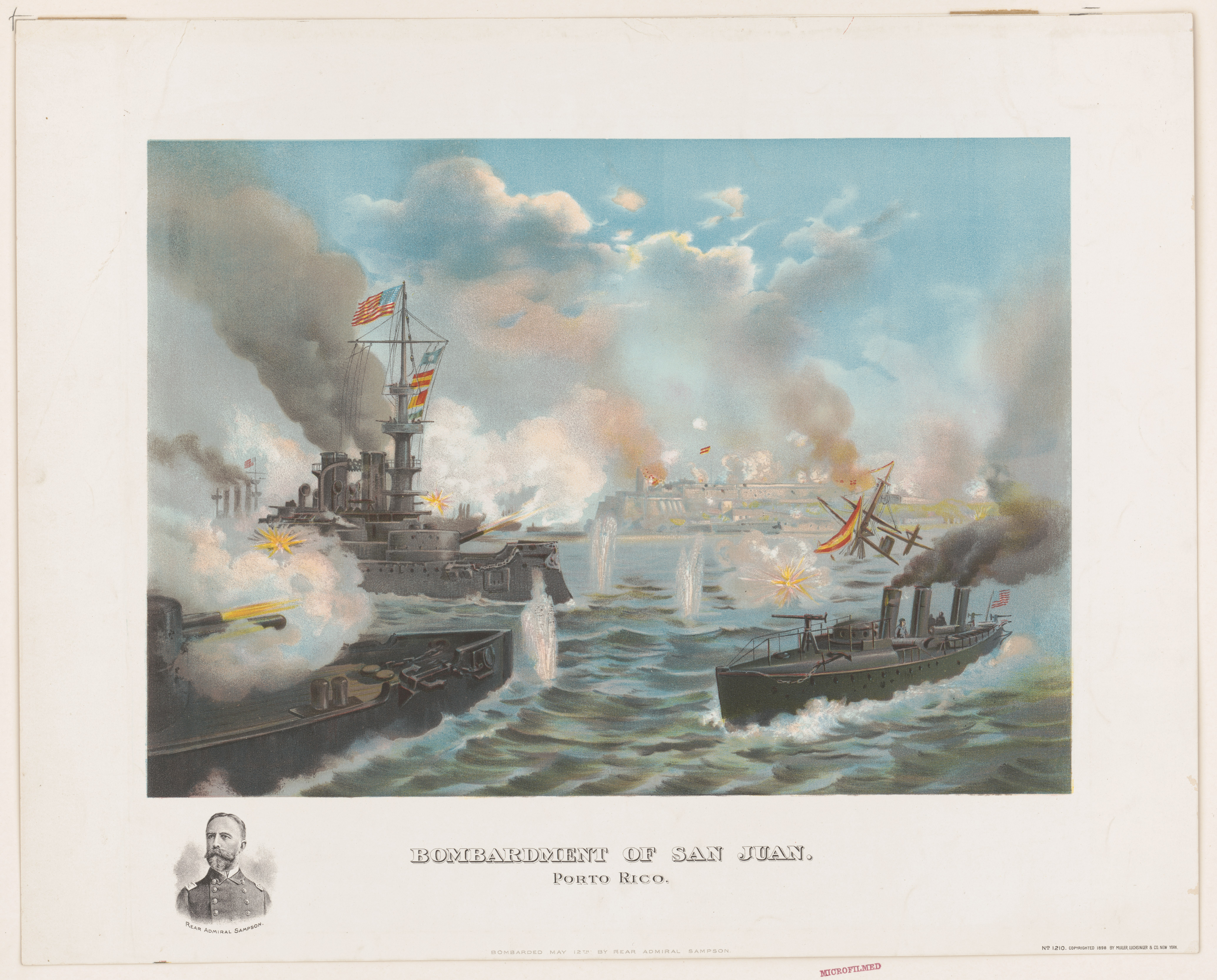
Artistic rendering of the 1898 Bombardment of San Juan by American forces during the Spanish–American War

The Spanish–American War broke out in late April. The American strategy was to seize Spanish colonies in the Atlantic—Puerto Rico and Cuba—and their possessions in the Pacific—the Philippines and Guam. On 10 May, Spanish forces at Fort San Cristóbal under the command of Capt. Ángel Rivero Méndez in San Juan exchanged fire with the USS Yale under the command of Capt. William C. Wise. Two days later, on 12 May, a squadron of 12 US ships commanded by Rear Admiral William T. Sampson bombarded installations at San Juan. On 25 June, the USS Yosemite blocked San Juan harbor. On 18 July, General Nelson A. Miles, commander of US forces, received orders to sail for Puerto Rico and to land his troops. On 21 July, a convoy with nine transports and 3,300 soldiers, escorted by USS Massachusetts, sailed for Puerto Rico from Guantánamo. General Nelson Miles landed unopposed at Guánica, located in the southern coast of the island, on 25 July 1898, with the first contingent of American troops. Opposition was met in the southern and central regions of the island but by the end of August the island was under United States control.

On 12 August, peace protocols were signed in Washington and Spanish Commissions met in San Juan on 9 September to discuss the details of the withdrawal of Spanish troops and the cession of the island to the United States. On 1 October, an initial meeting was held in Paris to draft the Peace Treaty and on 10 December 1898, the Treaty of Paris was signed (ratified by the US Senate 6 February 1899). Spain renounced all claim to Cuba, ceded Guam and Puerto Rico and its dependent islets to the United States, and transferred sovereignty over the Philippines to the United States and in turn was paid $20,000,000 ($770 million in 2025 dollars) by the U.S. General John R. Brooke became the first United States military governor of the island.

== United States sovereignty (1898–present) ==
=== Military government ===
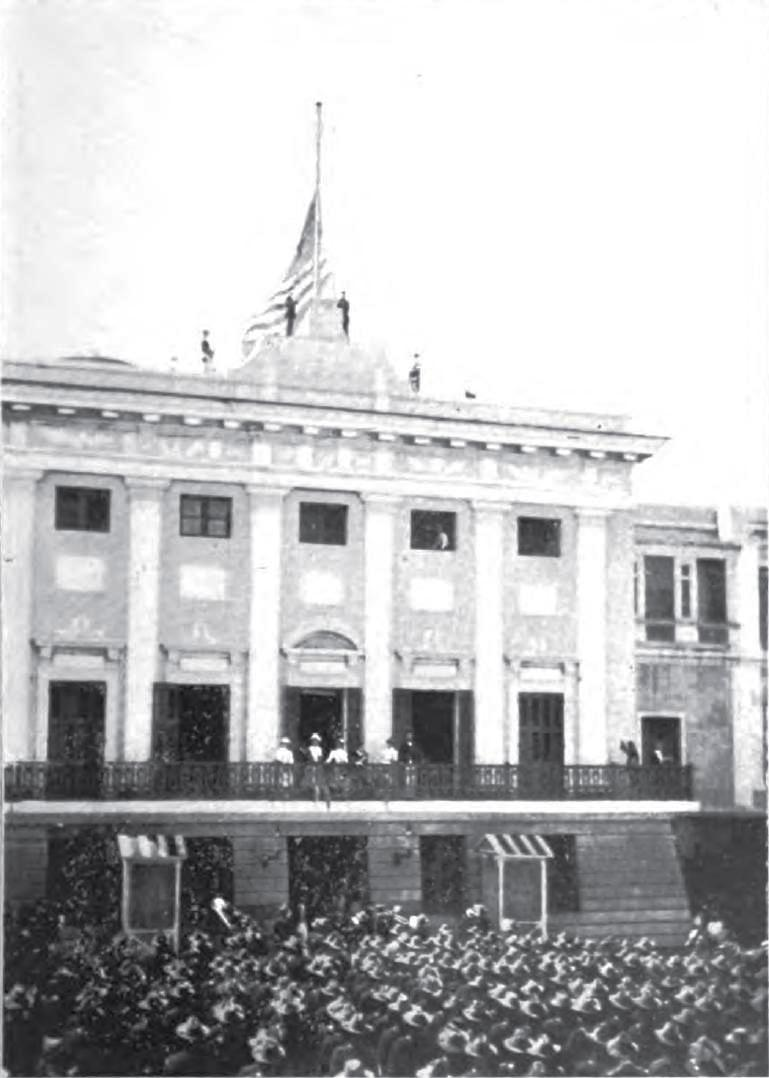
Raising the US Flag over San Juan, 18 October 1898.

After the ratification of the Treaty of Paris of 1898, Puerto Rico came under the colonial control of the United States of America. This brought about significant changes: the name of the island was changed to Porto Rico (it was changed back to Puerto Rico in 1932) and the currency was changed from the Puerto Rican peso to the United States dollar. Freedom of assembly, speech, press, and religion were decreed and an eight-hour day for government employees was established. A public school system was begun and the U.S. Postal service was extended to the island. The highway system was enlarged, and bridges over the more important rivers were constructed. The government lottery was abolished, cockfighting was forbidden (it was legalized again in 1933), and a centralized public health service established. Health conditions were poor at the time, with high rates of infant mortality and numerous endemic diseases.

The 45-star flag, used by the United States during the invasion of Puerto Rico, was also the official flag of Puerto Rico from 1899 to 1908.

The beginning of the military government also marked the creation of new political groups. The Partido Republicano, 'Republican Party' and the American Federal Party were created, led by José Celso Barbosa and Luis Muñoz Rivera, respectively. Both groups supported annexation by the United States as a solution to the colonial situation. The island's Creole sugar planters, who had suffered from declining prices, hoped that U.S. rule would help them gain access to the North American market.

Disaster struck in August 1899, when two hurricanes ravaged the island: the 1899 San Ciriaco hurricane on 8 August, and an unnamed hurricane on 22 August. Approximately 3,400 people died in the floods and thousands were left without shelter, food, or work. The effects on the economy were devastating: millions of dollars were lost due to the destruction of the majority of the sugar and coffee plantations. Afterwards, nearly 5000 Puerto Ricans migrated to Hawaii by 1910 to work in the sugar plantations of Hawaii.

=== Insular government ===
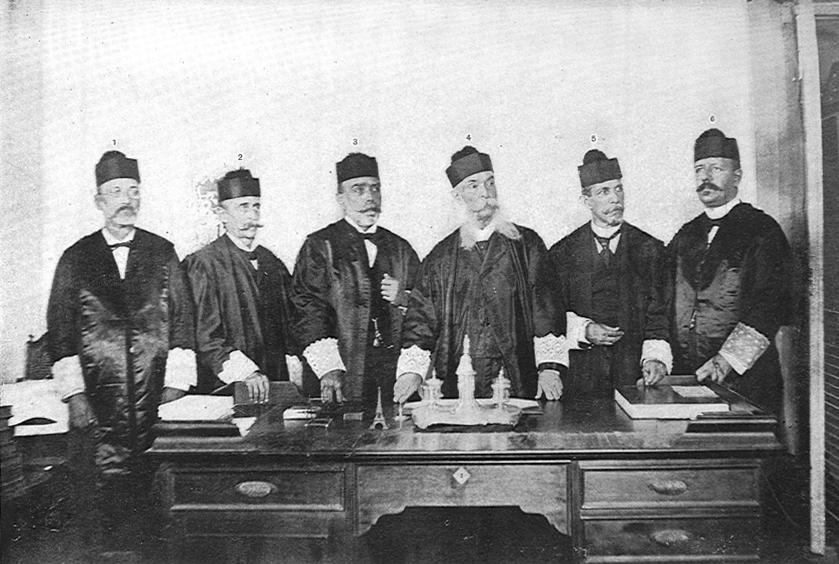
The first Supreme Court of Puerto Rico, established in 1900.

The military government in Puerto Rico was short lived; it was disbanded on 2 April 1900, when the U.S. Congress enacted the Foraker Act (also known as the Organic Act of 1900), sponsored by Senator Joseph B. Foraker. This act established a civil government and free commerce between the island and the United States. The structure of the insular government included a governor appointed by the President of the United States, an executive council (the equivalent of a senate), and a legislature with 35 members, though the executive veto required a two-thirds vote to override. The first appointed civil governor, Charles Herbert Allen, was inaugurated on 1 May 1900. On 5 June, President William McKinley appointed an Executive Council which included five Puerto Rican members and six U.S. members. The act also established the creation of a judicial system headed by the Supreme Court of Puerto Rico and allowed Puerto Rico to send a Resident Commissioner as a representative to Congress. The Puerto Rico Department of Education was subsequently formed, headed by Martin Grove Brumbaugh (later governor of Pennsylvania). Teaching was conducted entirely in English with Spanish treated as a special subject. Both languages, however, were official on the island. On 6 November, the first elections under the Foraker Act were held and on 3 December, the first Legislative Assembly took office. On 14 March 1901, Federico Degetau took office as the first Resident Commissioner from Puerto Rico in Washington.

==== Immediate economic changes ====
The island's social and economic structure modernized after 1898, with new infrastructure such as roads, ports, railroads and telegraph lines, new public health measures, hospitals, and programs to develop agriculture. The high infant mortality death rate of the late 19th century declined steadily, thanks in large measure to basic public health programs.

Following the takeover of rich lands by the United States in 1899, Puerto Rico shifted towards a capitalist mode of production. The Hollander Act was enacted in 1901, leading to a 2% tax on rural property. The tax was reduced to 1% following widespread protests, but landowners were still forced to sell their land as a result.

Sugar mill owners between the period of 1898 and 1945 turned their sugar mills into monocultural plantations in response to the economy of the 20th century. The sugar mills and tobacco, cigar, and cigarette factories gained the United States' attention due to their fast productions and large amount of produce. Women and children were the primary workers within these industries. Puerto Rican trades went to the United States 95% of the time. By 1914, the coffee production that once was steady failed.

The sugar industry rose along with the economy. Puerto Rican mill owners and French and Spanish residents took the United States' corporate capital. Four United States operations were part of the United Sugar Refineries, which were owned by Cuba and the Dominican Republic. In 1870, Congress introduced tariffs to protect domestic sugar producers. Puerto Rico's sugar industry suffered as a result, but the acquisition of Puerto Rico by the United States brought free trade between the two. Capital flowed into Puerto Rico with the effect of modernizing its sugar processing mills due to the United States' influence.

Puerto Rico's agricultural economy was transformed into a sugar monoculture economy, supplemented by gardens for local consumption. American sugar companies had an advantage over the local sugar plantation owners, who could only finance their operations at local banks, which offered high interest rates compared to the low rates that American companies received from the commercial banks in Wall Street. This factor, plus the tariffs imposed, forced many of the local sugar plantation owners to go bankrupt or to sell their holdings to the more powerful sugar companies. Sugar was considered one of the few strategic commodities in which the United States was not fully self-sufficient. In 1950, Puerto Rico had a record sugar crop.

While the sugar industry suffered in the late 1800s, the coffee industry flourished. By the end of the 19th century, the island was the world's seventh largest producer of coffee. This changed after 1898, when export production replaced farming. People lost their land and properties, the amount of land disposal shrank, and the people hoped that Europe would take part in the trade of coffee, but they did not. Coffee makers were not happy with them being controlled by the United States. In 1933, most of the people worked as families instead of individuals most likely due to 90 percent of them being poor.

The United States had formed a Tobacco Trust that had basis rules for cigarettes, but Puerto Ricans had issues when it came to brand and local marketing. The Tobacco Trust controlled cigarettes and cigar production as well as the tobacco leaf. There was a fall of the industry due to the exports.

==== Social and educational changes ====
Cockfighting was originally banned following the American takeover. However, in 1933, cockfighting was legalized again and became a booming industry.

The American administrators put great emphasis on developing a modern school system. English-language instruction provoked fears of cultural genocide. This effort generated resistance from teachers, parents, politicians, intellectuals, and others. Resistance to the imposition of English was part of a larger effort to resist invasion and colonization. The schools became an arena for "cultural identity" as promoted by middle-class local teachers, who rejected the idea of creating students speaking only English, and instead sought to have a Puerto Rican culture that incorporated the best of modern pedagogy and learning with a tie for the island's Hispanic language and cultural traditions. U.S. officials underestimated the place of Spanish in Puerto Rican culture. By 1898 Spanish language was firmly rooted in the population. Spanish was also one of the leading international languages through which Puerto Ricans were in contact with the world. The level of opposition to the imposition of English was such that it led to the failure of U.S. language policies in Puerto Rico.

One shock came in 1935, however, when a New York study found Puerto Rican schoolchildren in New York City to be seriously deficient in basic skills. After 39 years of the imposition of English at the University of Puerto Rico, Spanish became the preferred language of instruction in 1942, and in public schools the vernacular Spanish became the language of teaching and learning in 1940–50.

==== Politics ====
An economically evolving Puerto Rico called for a new advancement in political status. Powerful, innovative Puerto Rican leaders, including Luis Muñoz Rivera, José de Diego, Rosendo Matienzo Cintrón, Manuel Zeno Gandía, Luis Lloréns Torres, Eugenio Benítez Castaño, and Pedro Franceschi, contributed to the rise of multiple successful political parties. However, the birth of multiple political groups led to a diversion of the island's interests: uniting as a statehood with the US, becoming a US territory/commonwealth, or declaring independence altogether. In 1900, the Partido Federal, 'Federal Party' was formed during the US military rule of the island after the Spanish–American War. It was formed by Luis Munoz Rivera and other members of the Autonomist Party. The Partido Federal favored immediate transformation of Puerto Rico into an organized unincorporated territory and eventually US statehood. The Partido Obrero Socialista de Puerto Rico, 'Socialist Labor Party of Puerto Rico' were founded by Santiago Iglesias Pantin. Over time the Partido Obrero Socialista de Puerto Rico was also in favor of statehood with the US. The Partido Federal campaigned for assimilation into the United States and wanted to develop prosperously with their best interests under the new US administration. They wanted to fully integrate US law and government. Their plan was to become a territory and have representation through a delegate and eventually become a US state with no restrictions. The Partido Obrero Socialista de Puerto Rico did not advocate for independence. Instead, party leader Santiago Iglesias Pantin advocated for statehood and change in economic policies which were influenced by his practice in founding the Federación Regional de Trabajadores (Regional Workers Federation) and labor newspaper Ensayo Obrero. The party was based on the principles of the Socialist Labor Party of America and received much support from American authorities. After the dissolution of the Federal Party, Luis Muñoz Rivera and José de Diego founded the Partido Unionista de Puerto Rico, 'Unionist Party of Puerto Rico' in 1904. The Unionist Party of Puerto Rico aimed to secure "the right of Puerto Rico to assert its own personality, either through statehood or independence." The beginning of the Partido Independentista, the independence party, was in 1909. Rosendo Matienzo Cintrón, Manuel Zeno Gandía, Luis Lloréns Torres, Eugenio Benítez Castaño, and Pedro Franceschi founded the party which was the first political party whose agenda was the independence of Puerto Rico.

The Puerto Rican status quo was again altered in 1909 when the Foraker Act, which replaced military rule with a civilian government in Puerto Rico, was modified by the Olmsted Amendment. This amendment placed the supervision of Puerto Rican affairs in the jurisdiction of an executive department designated by the president of the United States.^{[50]} In 1914, the first Puerto Rican officers, Martín Travieso (Secretary) and Manuel V. Domenech (Commissioner of Interiors), were assigned to the Executive Cabinet. This allowed for native Puerto Ricans to hold a majority in the Council, which consisted of five members selected by the president, for the first time in history. A 1915 delegation from Puerto Rico, accompanied by the Governor Arthur Yager, traveled to Washington, D.C. to ask Congress to grant the island more autonomy. Luis Muñoz Rivera became one of the founders of the Union Party in Puerto Rico who was against the Foraker Act. This delegation and speeches made by Resident Commissioner Muñoz Rivera in Congress, coupled with political and economic interests, led to the drafting of the Jones–Shafroth Act of 1917 (Jones Act).

=== Organized U.S. territory ===
==== Jones Act of 1917 ====
The Jones Act was made to replace the Foraker Act, which allowed for the free entry of Puerto Rican goods into the U.S. market. The Jones Act was approved by the U.S. Congress on 5 December 1916, and signed into law by President Woodrow Wilson on 2 March 1917. Although it extended citizenship to Puerto Ricans, it wasn't always welcomed. The Partido Union had opposed extension of U.S. citizenship in 1912 if it didn't make Puerto Rico a state. If they didn't become a state, U.S. citizenship would be interpreted as an attempt to block independence of the Puerto Ricans. For them, the promise of citizenship didn't affirm the promise of statehood; it excluded any considerations of independence.

The act made Puerto Rico an "organized but unincorporated" United States territory, much like a colony. Puerto Ricans were also collectively given a restricted U.S. citizenship. This implied that Puerto Ricans residing on the island did not have full American citizenship rights, such as the right to vote for the President of the United States. As U.S. citizens, conscription could be extended to the island. A few months later, 20,000 Puerto Rican soldiers were sent to the United States Army during the First World War. The Act also divided governmental powers into three branches: an executive (appointed by the President of the United States), legislative, and judicial branch. The legislative branch was composed of the Senate, consisting of nineteen members, and a House of Representatives, consisting of 39 members. Legislators were freely elected by the Puerto Rican people. A bill of rights, which established elections to be held every four years, was also created.

Though the act created a more structured government for the island, the United States Congress still held the right to veto or amend bills and laws passed by the territorial legislature. In addition to veto power, the United States could prevent the enforcing of actions taken by the legislature. The Act stated that the President of the United States was to appoint members of the Puerto Rico's legislative branch, as well as the directors of the six major government departments: Agriculture and Labor, Health, Interior, and Treasury (with the advice of Congress) and the Attorney General and the Commissioner of Education. The Act also made English the official language of the Puerto Rican courts, government, and the public education systems.

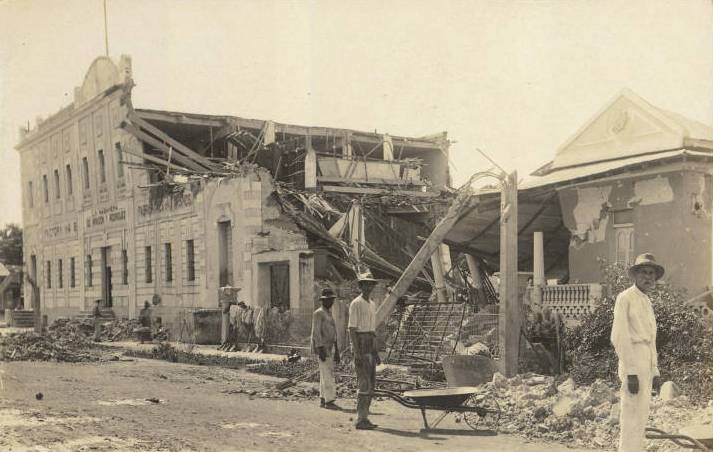
Aftermath in Mayaguez, of the 1918 earthquake.

On 11 October 1918, an earthquake occurred, with an approximate magnitude of 7.3 on the Richter scale, accompanied by a tsunami reaching 6.1 metres (20 ft) in height. The epicenter was located northwest of Aguadilla in the Mona Passage (between Puerto Rico and the Dominican Republic). This earthquake caused great damage and loss of life at Mayagüez, and lesser damage along the west coast. Tremors continued for several weeks. Approximately 116 casualties were reported resulting from the earthquake and 40 from the tsunami.

Some politicians were in favor of Puerto Rico becoming an incorporated state of the U.S., while others wanted Puerto Rico to gain independence from the United States. Amid this debate, a nationalist group emerged that encouraged radical activism for Puerto Rico to become independent from the United States. As a consequence of the Jones Act and the establishment of elections, a new political party, the Partido Nacionalista de Puerto Rico, 'Puerto Rican Nationalist Party', was founded on 17 September 1922. This party used advocated massive demonstrations and protests against any political activity that was not going to result in Puerto Rico gaining independence. In 1924, Pedro Albizu Campos joined the party and later became the vice president in 1927. In 1930, Albizu was elected president, and instilled many of his political ideologies into the party, which were composed heavily of anticolonial politics and feelings of contempt against the United States. In the 1930s, the Nationalist Party, led by president Pedro Albizu Campos, failed to attract sufficient electoral support and withdrew from political participation. Increased conflict arose between their adherents and the authorities. On 20 October 1935, Albizu testified against the dean of the University of Puerto Rico, claiming that he wanted to Americanize the institution. Four days later a student assembly gathered and declared Albizu a persona non grata, forbidding him to speak there. Albizu was later arrested for breaking the Smith Act of 1940, which declared that it was against the law for anyone to teach or be part of a group that encouraged the overthrow of the American government.

On 23 October 1935, a student assembly was planned to be held at the University of Puerto Rico-Río Piedras campus. Its officials asked Governor Blanton Winship to provide armed police officers for the campus to forestall possible violence. Colonel Elisha Francis Riggs, the U.S.-appointed Police Chief, commanded the forces. Several police officers spotted what they believed to be a suspicious-looking automobile and asked the driver Ramón S. Pagán for his license. Pagán was the Secretary of the Nationalist Party at this time. He was accompanied in the car by his friends and other Nationalist Party members Pedro Quiñones and Eduardo Rodríguez. The police officers asked Pagán to slowly drive to the police station on Calle Arzuaga, but while they were just a block away from the station, the police surrounded the vehicle and fired their guns into the car. Pagán, Quiñones, and Rodríguez were not armed with weapons. José Santiago Barea, another Nationalist, was approaching the car when police began shooting. It resulted in the death of the four nationalists and one bystander.

In retaliation for the "Río Piedras massacre" at the University of Rio Piedras, on 23 February 1936, Nationalists Hiram Rosado and Elias Beauchamp killed Colonel E. Francis Riggs in San Juan. They were taken into custody where they were killed by policemen and officers while being held at the San Juan headquarters. Rosado and Beauchamp were declared heroes by the Nationalist Party president, Pedro Albizu-Campos. Shortly after, the San Juan Federal Court had Albizu arrested for his incitement of discontent. After initially being found innocent in a jury with seven Puerto Ricans and two North Americans, the judge ordered a new jury which had ten North Americans and two Puerto Ricans, who found him guilty. On 31 July 1936, Albizu and several other Nationalists such as Juan Antonio Corretjer and Clemente Soto Vélez were convicted of being associated with Riggs' murder. They were sentenced to six to 10 years in a federal prison in the United States.

In 1936, the U.S. Senator Millard Tydings presented a legislative proposal to grant independence to Puerto Rico, but many people believed that it had unfavorable economic conditions.

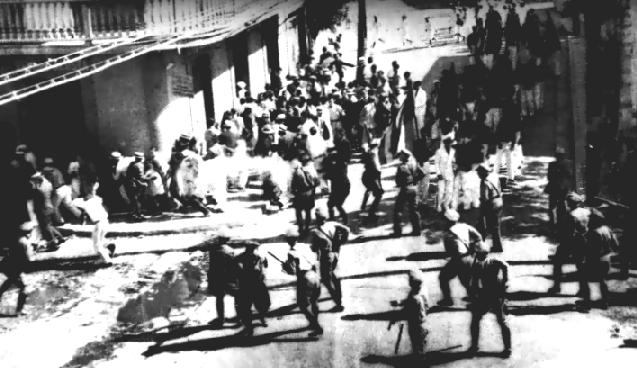
Picture by journalist Carlos Torres Morales of the Ponce massacre, 21 March 1937.

External audio
- You may watch newsreel scenes of the Ponce massacre here.

On 21 March 1937, a peaceful march was organized by the Nationalist Party, under Pedro Alibizu Campos, to commemorate the ending of slavery in Puerto Rico in 1873 by the governing Spanish National Assembly. The police, under the orders of General Blanton Winship, the US-appointed colonial Governor of Puerto Rico, opened fire at the peaceful Puerto Rican Nationalist Party parade, which is now known as the "Ponce massacre": 20 unarmed people (including two policemen) were killed, with wounded persons ranging between 100 and 200. This occurred because the head of the police force in Juana Díaz, Guillermo Soldevila, raised a whip and struck the chest of Tomás Lopez de Victoria, the captain of the cadet corps, and told him to stop the march. As a result, a police officer, Armando Martinez, ran from the corner in front of the Nationalist council and fired once into the air. This prompted many others to fire their arms.

On 25 July 1938, just over a year after the Ponce massacre, Governor Winship ordered a military parade to take place in the city of Ponce in celebration of the American invasion of Puerto Rico. Such celebrations customarily took place in San Juan, the capital of the colonial government. At the parade, an attempt was made to assassinate Winship, allegedly by members of the Nationalist Party. It was the first time in Puerto Rico's long history that an attempt had been made against a governor. Although Winship escaped unscathed, a total of 36 people were wounded, including a colonel in the National Guard and the Nationalist gunman.

==== Pre-WWII economy ====
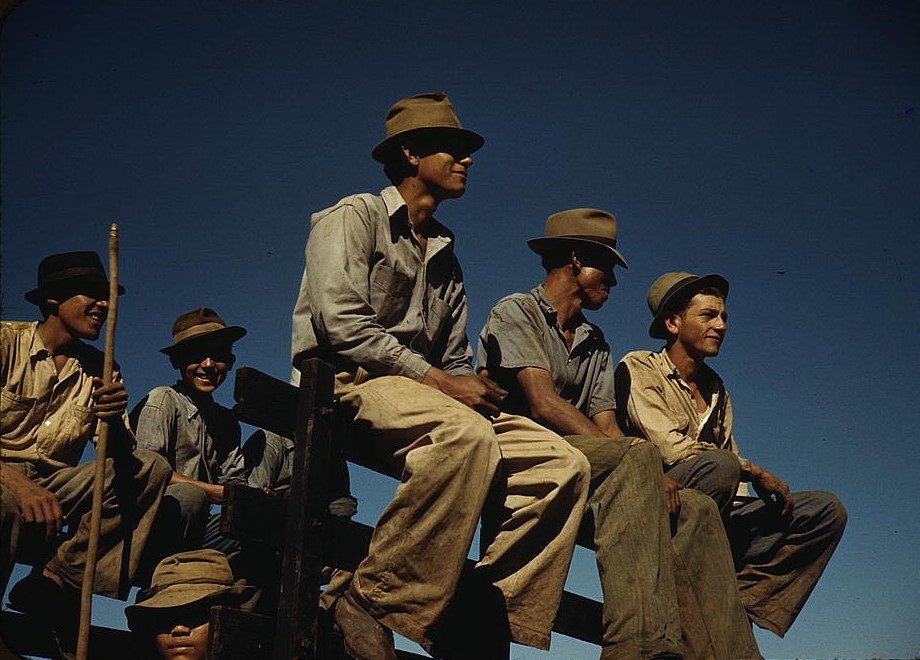
Sugar cane workers resting at the noon hour, Rio Piedras. Photograph by Jack Delano, a photographer for the Farm Security Administration. Ca. 1941.

Coffee was a major industry before the 1940s. Arabica beans were introduced to the island in 1736. Production soared in the central mountainous area after 1855 because of cheap land, a low-paid and plentiful workforce, good credit facilities, and a growing market in the U.S., Spain and Europe. Decline set in after 1897, and the end came with a major hurricane in 1928 and the 1930s depression. While coffee declined, sugar and tobacco grew in importance, thanks to the large mainland market.

Land tenure did not become concentrated in fewer hands, but income increased as American agribusiness and capital investments arrived. The land tenure system was in the firm control of local farmers (small, medium, and large). After 1940 dairying became an industry second only to sugar, and had a higher dollar output than the better-known traditional crops – coffee and tobacco.

In the 1920s, the economy of Puerto Rico boomed. A dramatic increase in the price of sugar, Puerto Rico's principal export, brought cash to the farmers. As a result, the island's infrastructure was steadily upgraded. New schools, roads and bridges were constructed. The increase in private wealth was reflected in the erection of many residences, while the development of commerce and agriculture stimulated the extension of banking and transport facilities.

This period of prosperity came to an end in 1929 with the onset of the Great Depression. At the time, agriculture was the main contributor to the economy. Industry and commerce slowed during the 1930s as well. The problems were aggravated when on 27 September 1932, Hurricane San Ciprián struck the island. Exact figures of the destruction are not known but estimates say that 200–300 people were killed, more than a thousand were injured, and property damage escalated to $30–50 million ($710 million to $1.18 billion as of 2025).

The agricultural production, the principal economic driver for the island, came to a standstill. Under President Franklin D. Roosevelt's New Deal, a Puerto Rican Reconstruction Administration was authorized. Funds were made available for construction of new housing, infrastructure, including transportation improvements and other capital investment to improve island conditions. In 1938, a new federal minimum wage law was passed, establishing it at 25 cents an hour. As a consequence, two-thirds of the island's textile factories closed because they could not be profitable while paying workers at that level.

=== Establishment of the Commonwealth ===
From 1948 to 1952 it was a felony to display the Puerto Rican flag in public; the only flag permitted to be flown on the island was the flag of the United States.

In the years after World War II, social, political and economical changes began to take place that have continued to shape the island's character today. 1943 saw the Legislative Assembly pass by unanimous vote a concurrent resolution calling for an end to the colonial system of government. The late 1940s brought the beginning of a major migration to the continental United States, mainly to New York City. The main reasons for this were an undesirable economic situation brought by the Great Depression, as well as strong recruiting by the U.S. armed forces for personnel and U.S. companies for workers.

In 1946 President Truman appointed Resident Commissioner Jesús T. Piñero to serve as island governor; he was the first Puerto Rican appointed to that position. In May 1948, a bill was introduced before the Puerto Rican Senate which would restrain the rights of the independence and nationalist movements on the archipelago. The Senate, which at the time was controlled by the Partido Popular Democrático, 'PPD' and presided by Luis Muñoz Marín, approved the bill. This bill became known as the Ley de la Mordaza (Gag Law, technically "Law 53 of 1948") when Piñero signed it into law on 10 June 1948. It made it illegal to sing a patriotic song, and reinforced the 1898 law that had made it illegal to display the Flag of Puerto Rico, with anyone found guilty of disobeying the law in any way being subject to a sentence of up to ten years imprisonment, a fine of up to US$10,000 (equivalent to $134,000 in 2025), or both.

The U.S. Congress passed an act allowing Puerto Ricans to elect their governor, and the first elections under this act were held on 2 November 1948. Muñoz Marín won the election, and was sworn in as the first democratically elected Governor of Puerto Rico on 2 January 1949.

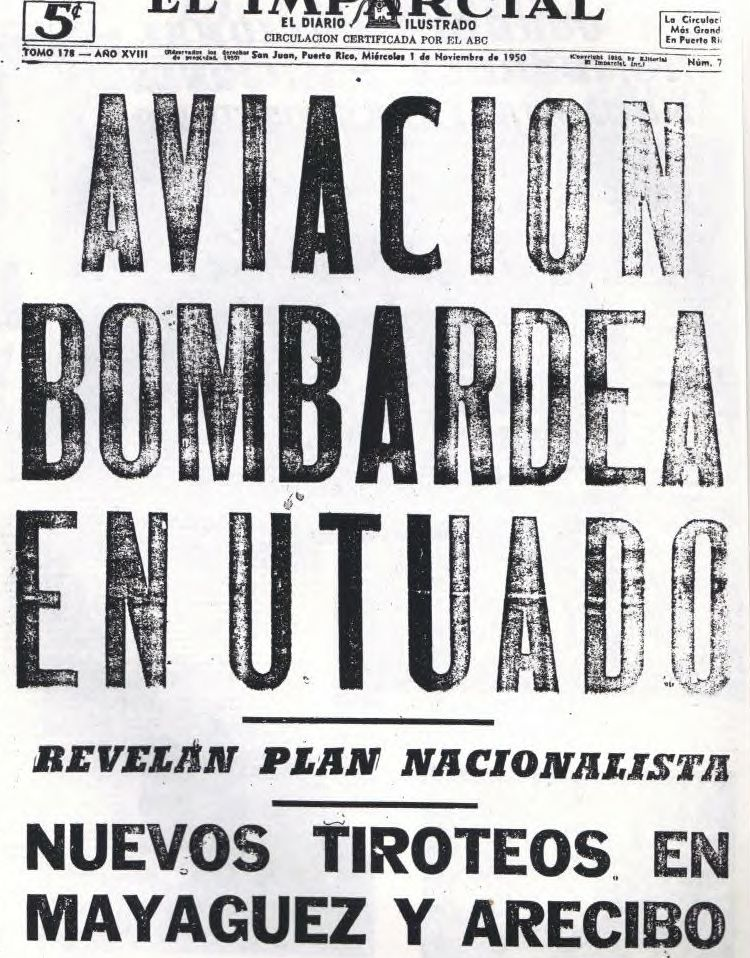
El Imparcial headline: "Aviation (US) bombs Utuado" during Nationalist revolts.

On 3 July 1950, President Harry S. Truman signed the Puerto Rico Federal Relations Act of 1950, which allowed Puerto Ricans to draft their own constitution to establish their own internal government — while the island was still under a gag law. It also authorized the President to forward the new constitution to the Congress, if he found it conformed to the provisions of the Act. The Constitution, which took effect upon approval by the U.S. Congress, formally named the territory "Estado Libre Asociado de Puerto Rico" in Spanish, but since the English translation "Free Associated State of Puerto Rico" was unacceptable, as the U.S. had not granted statehood, the name "Commonwealth of Puerto Rico" is used in English. Four U.S. states – Kentucky, Massachusetts, Pennsylvania, and Virginia – use "commonwealth" as part of their formal names; and the former Territory of the Philippines was elevated to Commonwealth Status in 1935 in preparation for independence, which was granted in 1946. Once in office, Muñoz Marin was directed to not pursue Puerto Rican Independence, which angered many of his constituents, and betrayed the wishes of his father, Luis Muñoz Rivera, and dealt another blow to the independence movement.

On 30 October 1950, a group of Puerto Rican nationalists, under the leadership of Pedro Albizu Campos, staged several attacks across the main island, known as the Puerto Rican Nationalist Party revolts of the 1950s, the most successful of which is known as the Jayuya Uprising. The revolts included an attack on the governor's mansion, La Fortaleza. Puerto Rican military forces were called in to put down the Jayuya Uprising. Two days later, two Nationalists from New York tried to storm in to Blair House in Washington D.C., then the president's temporary residence, to assassinate United States President Harry S. Truman. These acts led Muñoz to crack down on Puerto Rican nationalists and advocates of Puerto Rican independence. The actions by both Muñoz, under the Gag Law and the "Carpetas program", and the United States Government, through the "COINTELPRO program", would later be determined as infringing on constitutional rights.

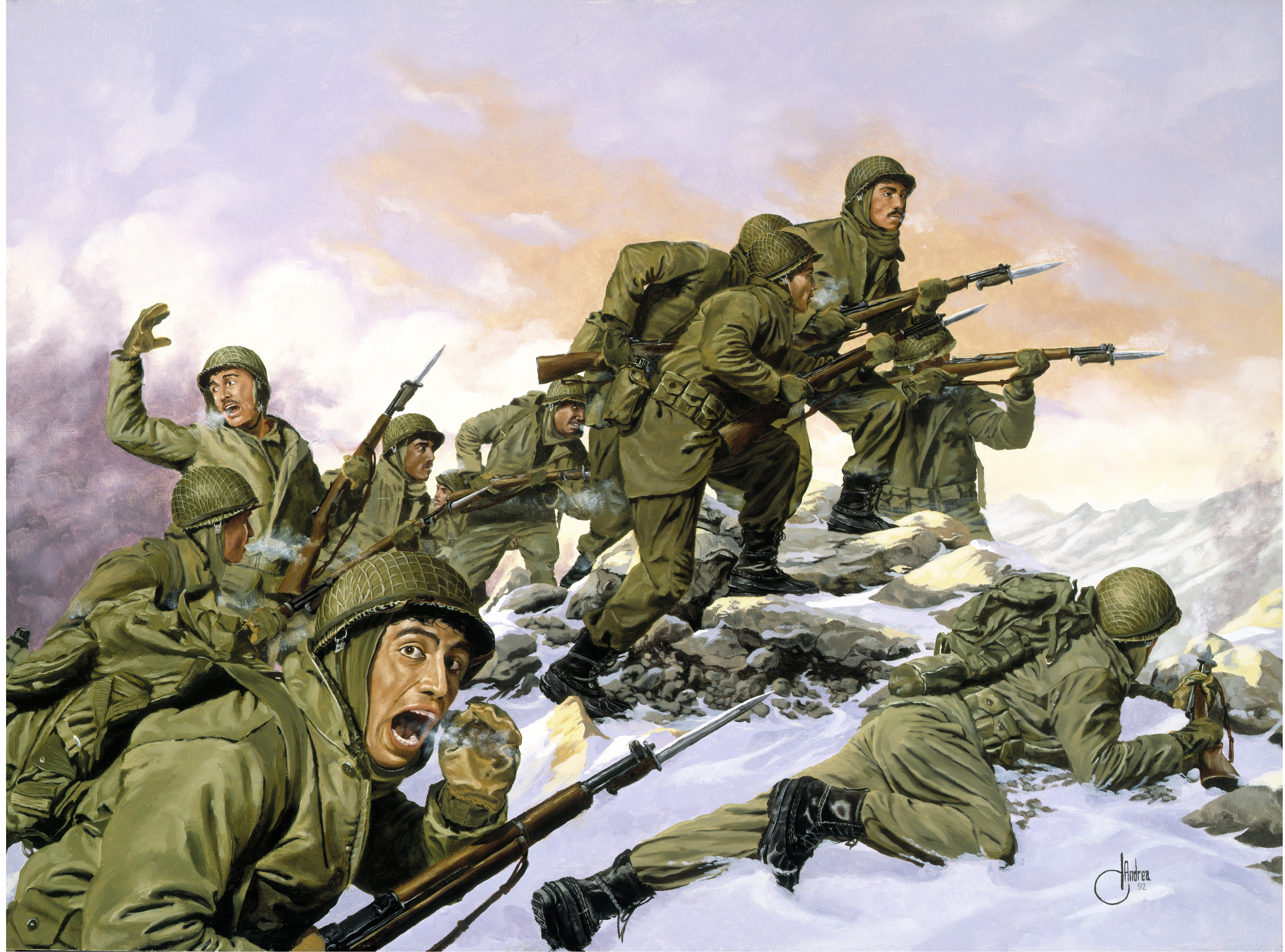
Painting of a bayonet charge by the U.S. 65th Infantry Regiment, made up of Puerto Rican troops, against a Chinese division during the Korean War

In February 1952, the Constitution of Puerto Rico was approved by voters in a referendum, and the US Congress gave its approval, subject Puerto Rico striking Sec. 20 of Article II and adding text to Sec. 3 of Article VII of the final draft, amendments that were finally ratified in November of that year. The territory organized under the name Estado Libre Asociado de Puerto Rico – adjusted, in English, to "Commonwealth of Puerto Rico", as the archipelago was not a full state (Estado). That same year marked the first time that the Flag of Puerto Rico could be publicly displayed, rather than being subject to the 10-year prison sentence that had been passed in the Gag Law of 1948. In March 1954, four Nationalists fired guns from the visitors gallery in the US House of Representatives at the Capitol, to protest the lack of Puerto Rican independence, wounding several persons.

The Official Languages Act of 1902 declared English and Spanish co-official languages in all government departments, courts, and island administrations. In 1993, Puerto Rico adopted both languages as official languages of the Puerto Rican government.

=== Statehood issue during the 20th century ===
Luis A. Ferré founded Estadistas Unidos (United Statehooders), an organization to campaign for statehood in the 1967 plebiscite, after the Statehood Republican Party chose to boycott the vote. On 23 July 1967, the first plebiscite on the political status of Puerto Rico was held. Voters affirmed continuation of Commonwealth status (Commonwealth–60.4% Statehood–39%; Independence–0.6%). Other plebiscites have been held to determine the political status of Puerto Rico, in 1993 and in 1998. Both times, although by smaller margins, the status quo has been upheld. In 2012, a majority voted to reject the current status and voted to become a state. The referendum was controversial as opponents had tried to persuade people to abstain from voting altogether and argued the vote was invalid.

As the U.S. Constitution empowers Congress to admit new states, the referendum could be taken only as a sign of popular opinion. Legally the island remains a territory of the United States, under congressional supervision. After the 1967 plebiscite, the Partido Nuevo Progresista, 'New Progressive Party or New Party for Progress' was organized under Ferré's leadership. The party campaigned for Puerto Rico to become the 51st state of the Union. Luis A. Ferré was elected governor on 5 November 1968, with 43.6% of the vote, the first time a pro-statehood governor had received a plurality. The New Progressive Party, the Popular Democratic Party, the Independence Party, and the Movimiento Victoria Ciudadana (Citizen's Victory Movement) constitute the current political status-based registered political parties in the island.

=== Economy since 1945 ===
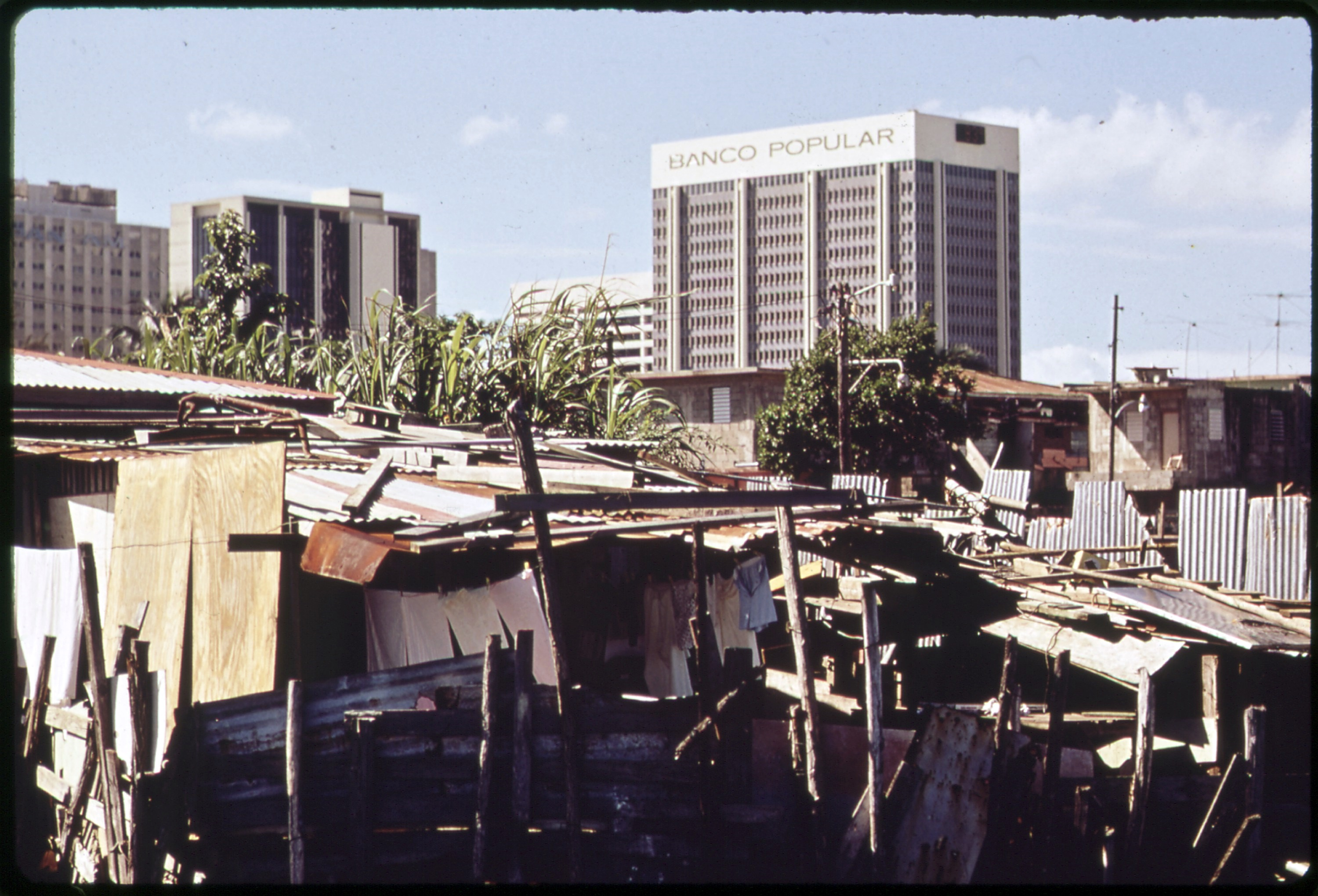
A shantytown along the Martin Peña Channel (1973)

After World War II, large numbers of young people migrated to the mainland's industrial cities for work and remitted dollars back to their families. In 1950 Washington introduced Operation Bootstrap, which greatly stimulated economic growth from 1950 until the 1970s. Due to billions of dollars of corporate investments, the growth rate was 6% for the 1950s, 5% for the 1960s, and 4% for the 1970s. Puerto Rico became one of the most affluent economies in Latin America. However, it had to import 80% of its food.

Operation Bootstrap was sponsored by governor Muñoz Marín. It was coupled with agrarian reform (land redistribution) that limited the area that could be held by large sugarcane interests. Operation Bootstrap enticed US mainland investors to transfer or create manufacturing plants by granting them local and federal tax concessions, but maintaining the access to mainland markets free of import duties. Another incentive was the lower wage scales in the densely populated island. The program accelerated the shift from an agricultural to an industrial society. The 1950s saw the development of labor-intensive light industries, such as textiles; later manufacturing gave way to heavy industry, such as petrochemicals and oil refining, in the 1960s and 1970s. Muñoz Marín's development programs brought some prosperity for an emergent middle class. The industrialization was in part fueled by generous local incentives and freedom from federal taxation, while providing access to continental US markets without import duties. As a result, a rural agricultural society was transformed into an industrial working class. Manufacturing activity, however, has been burdened by electricity rates two to three times the average in the United States.

External audio
- Newsreel scenes in Spanish of the Puerto Rican Nationalist Party Revolts of the 1950s are here.

In 1976, the U.S. Congress exempted companies in Puerto Rico from paying income tax on revenue generated there. This, along with cheap labor, generated an influx of pharmaceutical companies. This tax exemption was phased out over ten years, from 1996 to 2006, resulting in a recession as companies moved production elsewhere.

In the mid-20th century, photos of people at political protests were distributed to large employers across the island, making them unemployable; the government apologized to and compensated the affected people in the 1990s.

In 2005, protests over the noise of bombing practice forced the closure of Roosevelt Roads Naval Station. This resulted in a loss of 6,000 jobs and an annual decrease in income of $300 million.

In 2006, Puerto Rico saw its credit rating downgraded to one notch above non-investment grade by the main credit rating agencies, with the possibility of more downgrades happening in the near future. This has led to fiscal measures to reduce government spending, increase revenues and balance the budget, and the implementation in 2006 and expansion in 2013 of a 7% sales tax.

Present-day Puerto Rico has become a major tourist destination and a pharmaceutical, manufacturing, and financial center for the Caribbean region.

In early 2017, the Puerto Rican government-debt crisis posed serious problems for the government which was saddled with outstanding bond debt that had climbed to $70 billion or $12,000 per capita at a time with a 45 percent poverty rate and 12.4% unemployment that is more than twice the mainland U.S. average. The debt had been increasing during a decade long recession.

The declining economy and mismanagement at the Puerto Rico Electric Power Authority (PREPA, created in 1941) resulted in $9 billion of debt, and by 2015 the agency had run out of money to buy fuel. In July 2017, it effectively filed for bankruptcy with promises to privatize. The severely neglected power grid was destroyed later that year by Hurricanes Irma and Maria. An overpriced, no-bid rebuilding contract with the politically connected Whitefish Energy was quickly cancelled. It took nearly a year to restore power to the entire island; Permission for privatization was given in 2018, and electrical distribution was contracted to LUMA Energy for 15 years, starting in June 2021.

The Commonwealth had been defaulting on many debts, including bonds, since 2015. "Without action before April, Puerto Rico's ability to execute contracts for Fiscal Year 2018 with its managed care organizations will be threatened, thereby putting at risk beginning July 1, 2017 the health care of up to 900,000 poor U.S. citizens living in Puerto Rico", according to a letter sent to Congress by the Secretary of the Treasury and the Secretary of Health and Human Services. They also said that "Congress must enact measures recommended by both Republicans and Democrats that fix Puerto Rico's inequitable health care financing structure and promote sustained economic growth."

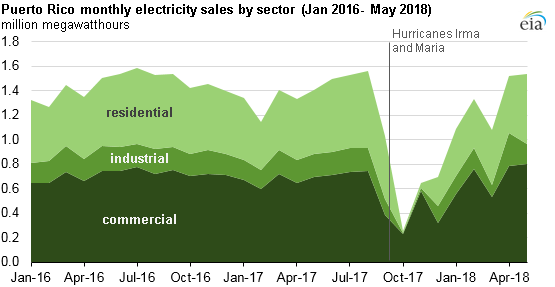
Hurricanes Irma and Maria sharply reduced the availability of electricity throughout the island

Initially, the oversight board created under PROMESA called for Puerto Rico's governor Ricardo Rosselló to deliver a fiscal turnaround plan by 28 January. Just before that deadline, the control board gave the Commonwealth government until 28 February to present a fiscal plan (including negotiations with creditors for restructuring debt) to solve the problems. A moratorium on lawsuits by debtors was extended to 31 May. The Fiscal Control Board eventually approved a fiscal austerity plan which cut government services in order to repay creditors.

Between 2009 and 2019, over a million Puerto Ricans migrated to the United States.

=== 21st century disasters ===
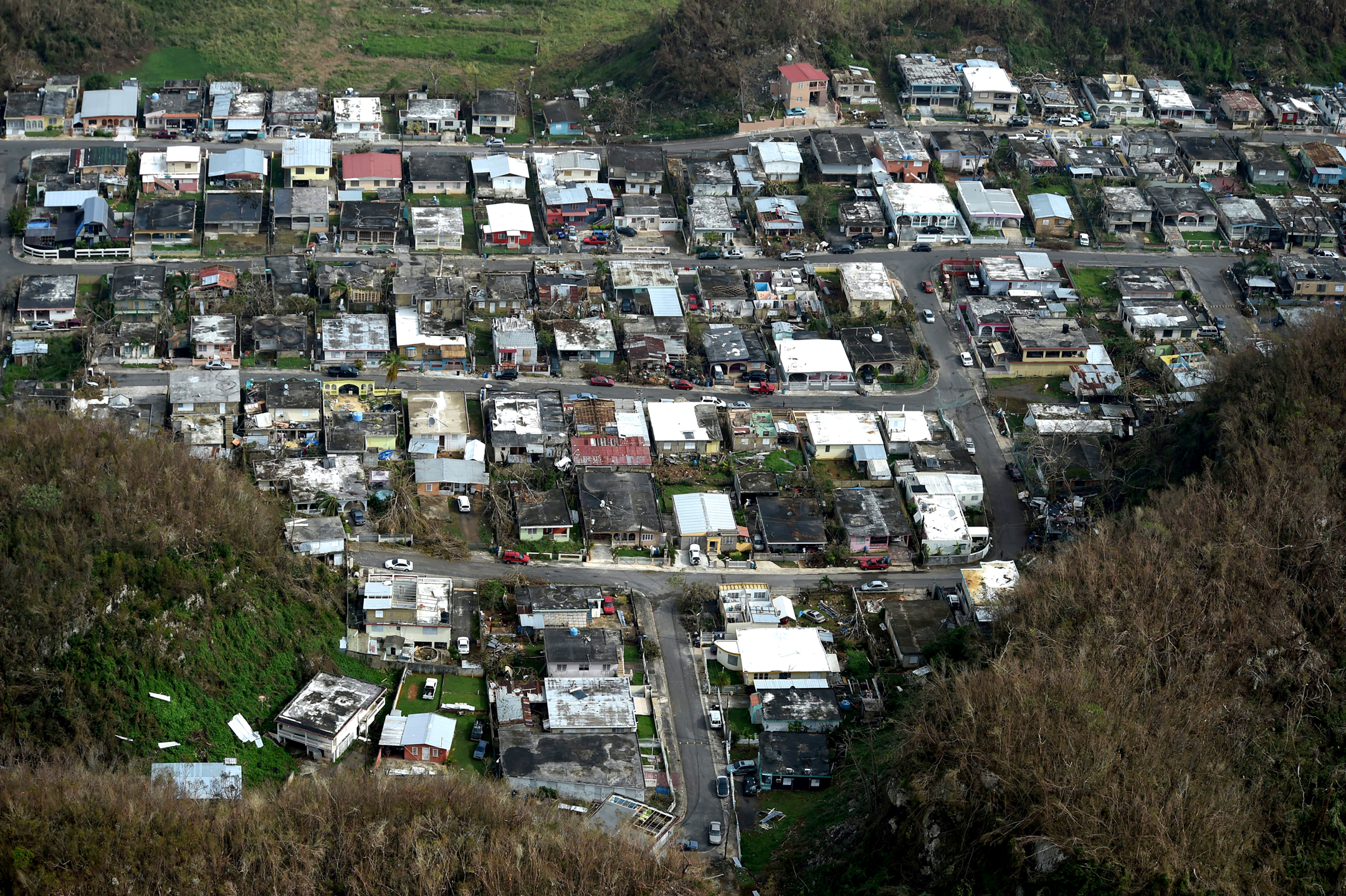
A neighborhood in Puerto Rico heavily damaged by the storm.

While the eye of Category 5 Hurricane Irma passed north of the island on 5 September 2017, winds were sufficient to leave 1 million citizens without power. On 20 September 2017, Hurricane Maria hit the island directly, destroying infrastructure – electricity, potable water supplies, transportation, and communication. Millions went without power for several months. The disaster and slow recovery caused an exodus of 130,000 people by December, depressing the island's economy for years and worsening the fiscal crisis. In May 2018, the Natural Resources Defense Council rated Puerto Rico's potable water system was the worst in the country as measured by the Safe Drinking Water Act, with 70% of the population living with water that violated U.S. law.

In December 2019 and January 2020, a series of earthquakes knocked out power island-wide and thousands of people were rendered homeless on the south side.

=== Statehood issue during the 21st century ===
Puerto Rico continues to struggle to define its political status under US rule. Even though Puerto Rico was granted the right to draft its own constitution while under a gag law, approved with conditions by Congress on 3 July 1952, it remains an unincorporated organized territory of the United States. With 13.3% co-sponsorship of the Puerto Rico Admissions Act in 2018, and only 5% in 2019, the US House of Representatives has demonstrated little interest in Puerto Rico being incorporated, let alone admitted as a state. A bill has never made it to the US Senate since the United States took possession of the islands in 1898.

The Puerto Rican status referendum, 2012 occurred on 6 November 2012. The result was a 54% majority of the ballots cast against the continuation of the island's territorial political status, and in favor of a new status. Of votes for new status, 61.1% (a majority) chose statehood. This was by far the most successful referendum for statehood advocates. In all earlier referendums, votes for statehood were matched almost equally by votes for remaining an American territory, with the remainder for independence. Support for U.S. statehood has risen in each successive popular referendum. Because there were almost 500,000 blank ballots in the 2012 referendum, creating confusion as to the voters' true desire, Congress decided to ignore the vote.

The Puerto Rican status referendum, 2017 occurred on 11 June 2017. While initially the referendum would only have the options of statehood and independence/free association, a letter from the Trump administration recommended to add the Commonwealth, the current status, in the plebiscite. The option had been removed from this plebiscite in response to the results of the plebiscite in 2012 which asked whether to remain in the current status and "No" had won. However, the Trump administration cited changes in demographics during the past five years to add the option once again. Amendments to the plebiscite bill were adopted, making ballot-wording changes requested by the U.S. Department of Justice, as well as adding a "current territorial status" option.

Governor Ricardo Rosselló is strongly in favor of statehood to help develop the economy and help to "solve our 500-year-old colonial dilemma ... Colonialism is not an option .... It's a civil rights issue ... 3.5 million citizens seeking an absolute democracy," he told the news media. Benefits of statehood include an additional $10 billion per year in federal funds, the right to vote in presidential elections, higher Social Security and Medicare benefits, and a right for its government agencies and municipalities to file for bankruptcy (which is currently prohibited).

Regardless of the outcome of the referendum, action by the United States Congress would be necessary to implement changes to the status of Puerto Rico under the Territorial Clause of the United States Constitution. With 13.3% co-sponsorship of the Puerto Rico Admissions Act in 2018, and only 5% in 2019, the US House of Representatives has demonstrated little interest in Puerto Rico being incorporated, let alone admitted as a state. A bill has never made it to the US Senate since the United States took possession of the islands in 1898. On 15 December 2022, the U.S. House of Representatives voted in favor of the Puerto Rico Status Act. The act sought to resolve Puerto Rico's status and its relationship to the United States through a binding plebiscite.

In September 2023, legislation providing for a two-round consultation process to decide the territorial status of Puerto Rico was reintroduced in the United States Congress by Roger Wicker. The first vote was scheduled for 4 August 2024, giving Puerto Ricans the choice between four options: annexation to the United States, independence, sovereignty in free association, and a free state associated with the United States.

In July 2024, Governor Pedro Pierluisi called a plebiscite on the status of Puerto Rico in November 2024, the first time the island's current status as a U.S. territory was not presented as an option during the plebiscite. The executive order follows the U.S. House of Representatives' 2022 approval of a bill to help Puerto Rico move toward a change in territorial status. Voters are given the choice of statehood, independence, or independence with free association, the terms of which would be negotiated regarding foreign affairs, U.S. citizenship, and use of the U.S. dollar.

On 15 February 2025, the Puerto Rico House of Representatives approved a resolution on the legal status of Puerto Rico, 'the resolution, requests that "the President and Congress of the United States of America respond promptly and act in accordance with the demands of the citizens of Puerto Rico.

In June 2025, the United Nations adopted a resolution in favor of self-determination and independence for Puerto Rico.

== See also ==
- Archivo General de Puerto Rico
- Cultural diversity in Puerto Rico
  - Corsican immigration to Puerto Rico
  - Crypto-Judaism
  - French immigration to Puerto Rico
  - German immigration to Puerto Rico
  - Irish immigration to Puerto Rico
  - Royal Decree of Graces of 1815
- History of women in Puerto Rico
- History of Puerto Ricans
- List of Puerto Ricans
- Military history of Puerto Rico
- National Register of Historic Places listings in Puerto Rico
- Official Historian of Puerto Rico
- Political status of Puerto Rico
- Proposed political status for Puerto Rico
- Sovereigntism (Puerto Rico)
- Special Committee on Decolonization
- Statehood movement in Puerto Rico
- Stateside Puerto Ricans, living on mainland
- Timeline of San Juan, Puerto Rico
