= Freedom of wombs =

Latin American doctrine that children of slaves could not automatically be enslaved

Free womb laws (Spanish: Libertad de vientres, Portuguese: Lei do Ventre Livre), also referred to as free birth or the law of wombs, was a 19th century judicial concept in several Latin American countries, that declared that all wombs bore free children. It abolished the legal principle of partus sequitur ventrem, which held that children of slaves were also slaves. Intended as a step towards gradual emancipation, it was unevenly adopted.

== By country ==
A movement for abolition grew in the American colonies in the 19th century, influenced by the liberal ideals spread by these countries' independence movements. In parallel to the instant abolition, the concept of gradual emancipation was developed in New England by the end of the 1770s and was codified in laws of several US states in 1780–1804.

One of the first steps toward abolition was the Ley de Libertad de Vientres, an 1811 law written by Manuel de Salas of Chile.

In Argentina, the Law of Wombs was passed on February 2, 1813 by the Assembly of Year XIII. The law stated that those born to slave mothers after January 31, 1813 would be granted freedom when contracting matrimony, or on their 16th birthday for women and 20th for men. Upon manumission, they were to be given land and tools to work it. In 1853, Argentina fully abolished slavery with the Constitution of 1853.

In Colombia, the Law of Wombs was first passed by the government of Antioquia in 1814, but it was not until 1824 that the country accepted it. After years of laws that only purported a partial advancement towards abolition, President José Hilario López, because of the growing popular unrest, pushed Congress to pass total abolition on May 21, 1851. Former owners were compensated by the government.

In Peru, the president José de San Martín established "the freedom of wombs" for those born after the declaration of independence in 1821.

Venezuela endorsed a similar law in 1821, as well as Ecuador, Uruguay in 1825, Paraguay in 1842, and Brazil in 1871.

In Brazil, the Rio Branco Law, also referred to as the "Law of Free Birth", was passed by the Brazilian Parliament in 1871. By the 1870s social tensions were rising due to slavery. As a compromise, Parliament enacted a law freeing children born to enslaved women. The "Law of Free Birth" meant that no children were to be born enslaved. Slaves would eventually be granted freedom through manumission and later on, emancipation laws that targeted older slaves.

Spain passed a similar law in 1869 to apply to its plantation colonies of Cuba and Puerto Rico, formally enacting it in 1870 with implementation set for 1872. On the Iberian mainland, Spain had abolished slavery in 1837. It is also known as Ley Moret (Moret Law).

The countries that first denied the enslavement of babies born to enslaved mothers proceeded to abolish slavery in total later. Similar gradual abolition laws had been passed in some of the northern United States after the American Revolutionary War, namely, New York in 1799 and New Jersey in 1804. All the slaves were freed in both states before the American Civil War.

== See also ==
- Partus sequitur ventrem
- Rio Branco Law
