= Román Baldorioty de Castro =

Puerto Rican politician and abolitionist

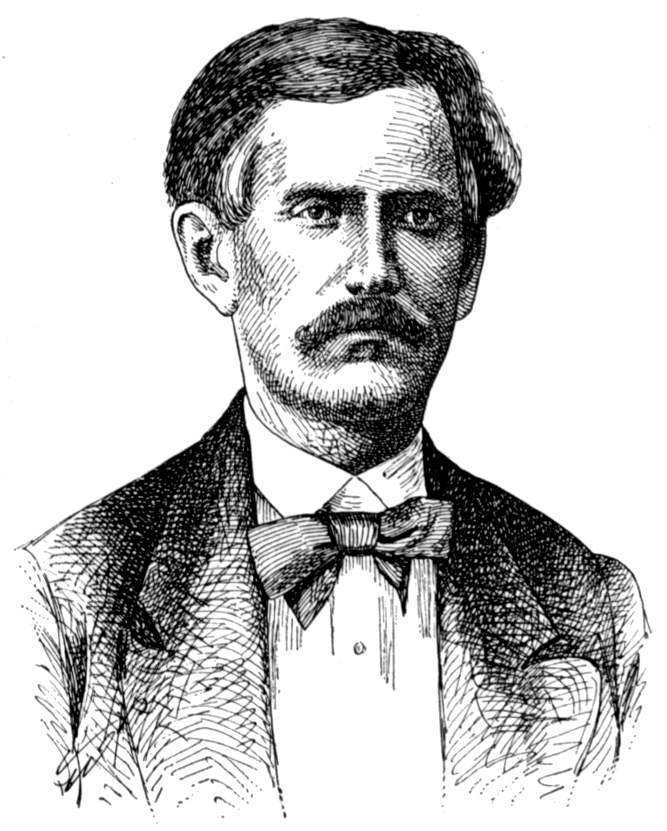
- Born: 23 February 1822; Guaynabo, Puerto Rico
- Died: 30 September 1889 (aged 67); Ponce, Puerto Rico
- Occupations: Professor, political activist

Román Baldorioty de Castro (23 February 1822 – 30 September 1889) was a leading Puerto Rican abolitionist and spokesman for the right to self-determination of Puerto Rico. In 1870, he was elected as a deputy in the Cortes Generales, the Spanish parliament, where he promoted abolition of slavery. In 1887, Baldorioty de Castro was the founder of the Partido Autonomista (Autonomist Party), also known as "Partido Autonomista Puro" (Pure Autonomous Party), "Partido Histórico" (Historic Party), and "Partido Ortodoxo" (Orthodox Party).

== Early years ==
Baldorioty de Castro was born in Guaynabo to a poor family. His family moved to San Juan when he was young, where he received his primary education as a student of the noted educator, Rafael Cordero. After completing his elementary education, he enrolled in El Seminario Conciliar de Idelfonso, which at that time was the most organized institution in Puerto Rico. He spent most of his adolescent years studying, and finished with one of the best averages in his class.

Baldorioty de Castro was granted a scholarship, which he used for further study in Spain. He collected the money necessary to travel and departed to Spain in the company of three fellow Puerto Ricans, two students and a professor. Before establishing a permanent residence in Madrid, the group traveled to several Spanish provinces, where they visited some of the country's tourist sites. Among the places visited were locations in Cordoba, Seville, Andújar and Bailén where they met Alberto Lista, an educator from Spain.

The three other students (who traveled with Baldorioty de Castro) contracted smallpox shortly after beginning their academic studies in the Central University of Madrid. Baldorioty de Castro cared for them, but two of the youths died from complications of the disease. Baldorioty de Castro was offered a chance to return to Puerto Rico but he declined. He continued his studies along with the only survivor and graduated with a degree in physics and mathematical sciences from the university. Dr. José Gualberto Padilla together with Román Baldorioty de Castro, founded the Puerto Rican chapter of the Sociedad Económica de los Amigos del País and called it "La Sociedad Económica de Amigos del País en Puerto Rico" (the Economic Friends of Puerto Rico). In 1847 the Sociedad de Amigos del País de Puerto Rico named Baldorioty de Castro the organization's correspondent in Spain. On 21 March 1851 he was granted permission to transfer to France to continue his studies. Baldorioty de Castro moved to Paris, where he attended the Central School of Arts.

== Political and professional careers ==
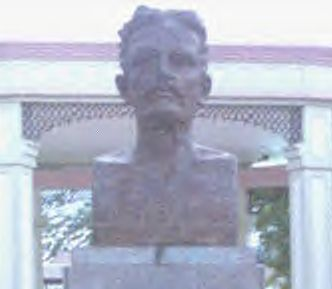
Bust of Baldorioty de Castro

In 1853, after seven years of study, Baldorioty de Castro returned to Puerto Rico and married Isabel Matilde Díaz y Ruiz, the granddaughter of Lieutenant Francisco Díaz, hero of the Battle of San Juan of 1797. Upon his return, he noticed that there was political tension, because of the differences between the governor in office and the political and educational groups in Puerto Rico.

Baldorioty de Castro began promoting the restructuring of the social, political and educational establishments. These contributions led Fernando Norzagaray, the colony's incumbent governor to offer him the position of mayor of one of the island's municipalities (towns). Baldorioty de Castro declined the offer, based on his ideals. At the time, the government displayed no interest in promoting education among the Criollos of the island. Two years earlier, the governor had imposed the Reglamento del Jornalero, which promoted a more ample labor base by reducing the amount of unemployed citizens. However, this measure was criticized for its elements that were used to increase the wealth of employers. As a consequence, the merits of said law were reconsidered and a group led by Baldorioty de Castro was selected to decide its validity. In 1853, he became a member of the Liberal Reform Party of Puerto Rico.

=== Educator ===
Besides politics, Baldorioty de Castro also loved teaching. He taught Botany and Maritime Sciences at the School of Commerce, Agriculture and Maritime Studies in San Juan. In January 1854, the Councilor Seminary selected Baldorioty de Castro as its botany professor. On November of that year, Puerto Rico's Commerce and Foment Joint selected him to work as a professor in a Nautical School, where he taught Maritime Studies.

The colonial government discovered that there was fertile terrain in the islands of Mona and Monito in 1856. After the discovery, they selected Baldorioty de Castro as the supervisor of a series of experiments to determine the terrain's components.

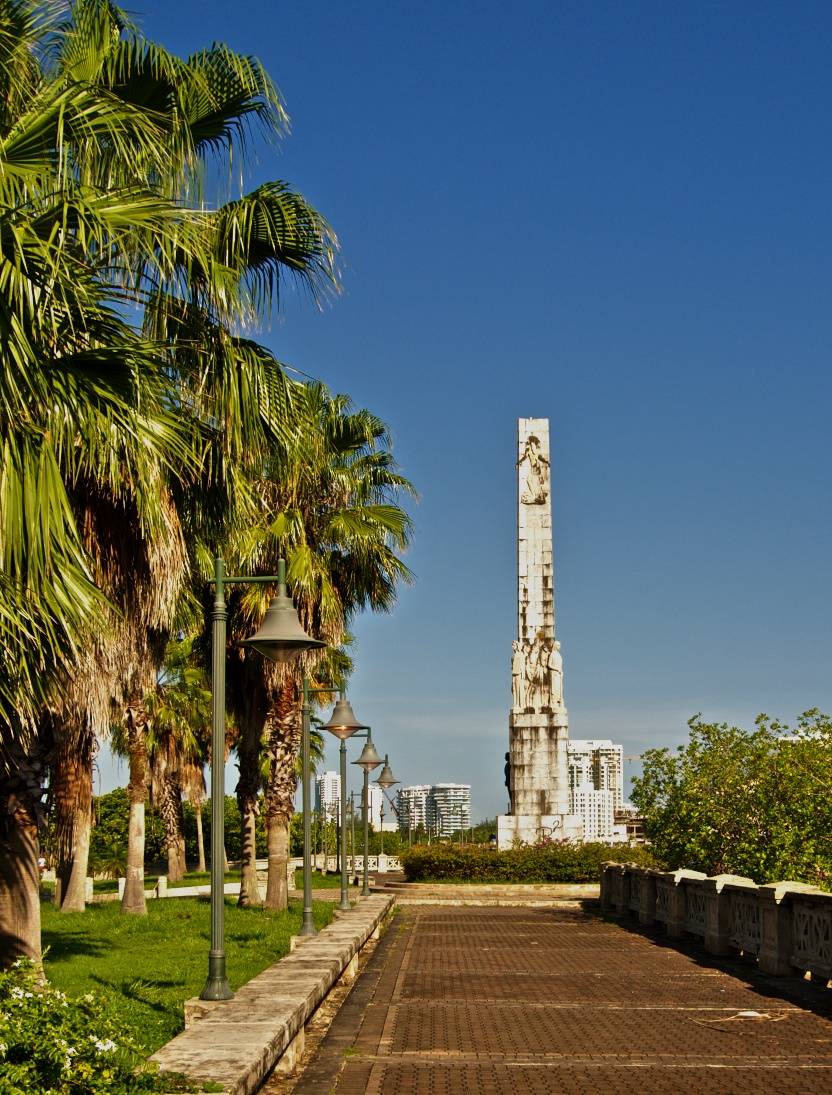
Obelisk to Baldorioty de Castro in San Juan, Puerto Rico

In 1857, the cattle industry in Puerto Rico began having difficulties, when the number of animals diminished significantly. To resolve this problem, the island's Economic Society formed a commission composed of Baldorioty de Castro, José Julián Acosta and Juan Hernández Arbizu.

Baldorioty de Castro proposed that geometry classes be included in the curriculum of elementary schools in Puerto Rico, which was accepted by the pertinent authority. On 2 January 1858, the Economic Society unanimously named him the Secretary of the Studies Commission. On 4 June 1860, the organization named him spokesman of a commission to promote conservation of the island's natural resources. Later that year, Baldorioty de Castro represented Puerto Rico as a delegate in the Spanish Parliament, serving for five years until 1865. On 17 September 1864, he was certified as an applied mechanics professor and worked for a salary of thirty-five dollars a month.

=== Spanish parliament ===
While working in the Spanish Parliament, he made the most of his position and encouraged the abolition of slavery in Puerto Rico and Cuba, and drafting a constitution to guarantee Puerto Ricans more political rights. On 4 November 1866, he was named Puerto Rico's representative to Paris' 1867 Universal Exposition. He served as a critic and subsequently wrote a review titled Exposición Universal de París en 1867. Memoria presentada a la Comisión Provincial de Puerto Rico. After completing his participation in Paris, Baldorioty de Castro returned to Puerto Rico.

There were rising tensions between groups that supported the abolition of slavery in the island and the Spanish colonial government. This led to protests and demands by the local Criollo population and influenced several revolutionaries, which led to the Grito de Lares. Baldorioty de Castro did not promote the armed revolution; instead he chose to debate the several conflicts and issues on diplomatic venues. After the revolution attempts, a new superior provisional government was established in the island. This government promoted a union between the conflicting parties in order to establish reforms in the government's structure. In line with the proposed solution, Baldorioty de Castro proposed a conciliation of these groups, but the efforts to unify the opposing views was unsuccessful. After this, he traveled to Madrid, under political pressure, and presented the island's status situation to the respective authorities.

He began writing several documents that strongly criticized the colonial government and wrote a report listing the elements that he felt were being used by the administration that were affecting the island's social and economic aspects. In January 1867, Baldorioty de Castro received a communication from Puerto Rico's Superior Instruction Juncture, notifying him that he was selected as a member of the Test Commission, where he was in charge of monitoring tests being issued in physics and the natural sciences.

In 1870, he was named deputy to the Spanish Parliament, after the governor in office had revoked his accreditation as an educator. There he continued to speak about his cause. Baldorioty de Castro became known as "The Father of Puerto Rican Autonomy". On 19 November 1872, Ramon Baldorioty de Castro together with Luis Padial, Julio Vizcarrondo and the Spanish Minister of Overseas Affairs, Segismundo Moret, presented a proposal for the abolition of slavery. On 22 March 1873, the Spanish Government approved the proposal, which became known as the Moret Law.

== Later years ==
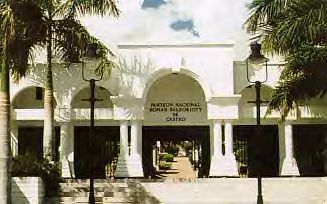
Panteón Nacional Román Baldorioty de Castro camposanto in Ponce, named in his honor and where Baldorioty de Castro's remains rest

Baldorioty de Castro returned to Puerto Rico in 1873 and went to live in the City of Ponce. There, he founded the newspaper El Derecho (The Law). He was also the founder of a weekly paper called La Crónica, in which he expressed his ideas on autonomy for the island.

In 1887, Baldorioty de Castro co-founded, along with José de Diego, the Autonomist Party of Puerto Rico. He named a young and upcoming politician, Antonio R. Barceló, the position of party Secretary. The Autonomist Party of Puerto Rico became one of Puerto Rico's first political parties. Its credo was that Puerto Rico should pick its own government and should have a representative in the Spanish Parliament.

The Spanish government, however, considered Baldorioty de Castro a dangerous person and a dissenter and had him jailed in Fort San Felipe del Morro in San Juan. Although he was not in jail for long and was soon released, his health suffered greatly during this imprisonment. Román Baldorioty de Castro died in Ponce on 30 September 1889. He is buried in Ponce's Cementerio Viejo cemetery which was renamed "Panteón Nacional Román Baldorioty de Castro".

== Legacy ==
The cities of Bayamón, Juana Díaz, San Germán and San Juan have honored the memory of Baldorioty de Castro by naming plazas after him. Puerto Rico Highway 26, called the Román Baldorioty de Castro Expressway, is the main highway to the Luis Muñoz Marín International Airport. In Puerto Rico's capital city, where the Baldorioty de Castro Expressway meets the Condado Lagoon in the Miramar neighborhood of Santurce, an obelisk was constructed in the center of the city park surrounding the lagoon. The obelisk is in honor of Baldorioty de Castro. A bronze statue of Baldorioty de Castro stands at the base of the statue as a gift of the people of Puerto Rico. There are schools named after him in other areas of Puerto Rico. The province of Azua de Compostela, Dominican Republic, honored him by naming one of the capital city's secondary education institutions after him: Liceo de Estudios Secundarios Román Baldorioty de Castro.

== Gallery ==
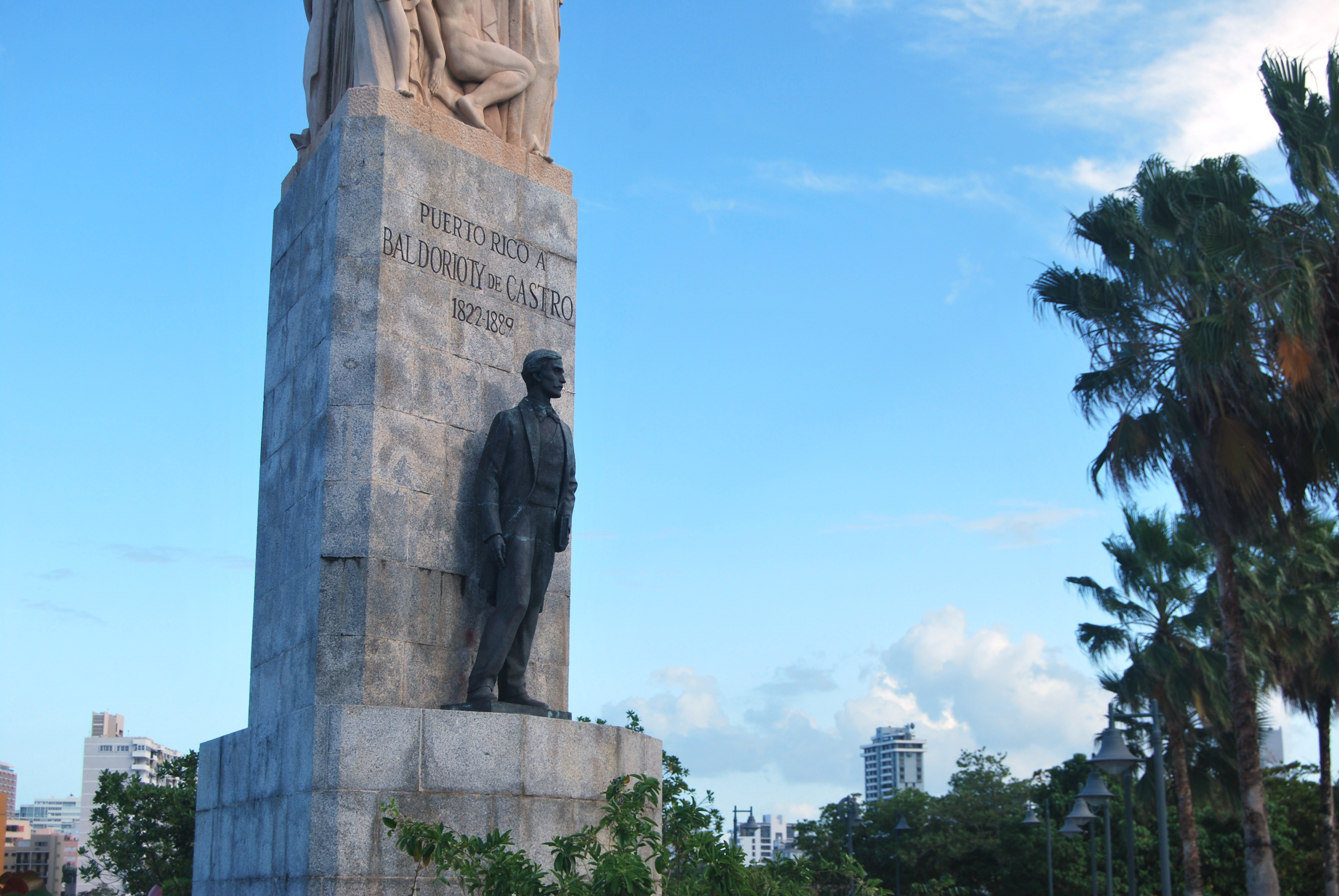
Statue of Baldorioty on PR-26

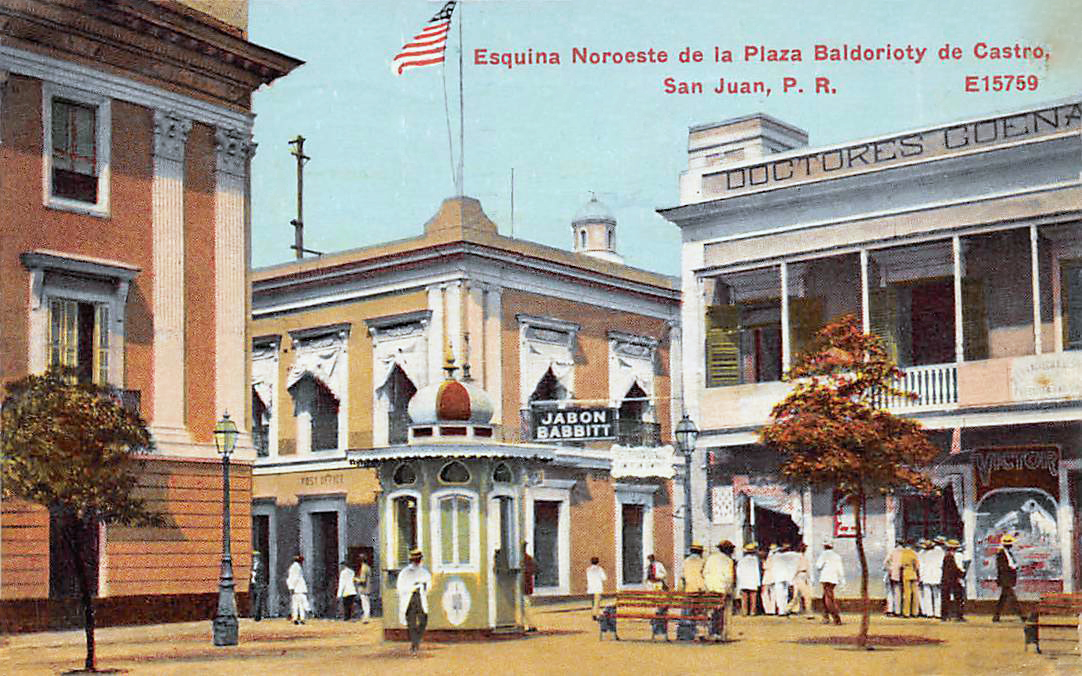
Baldorioty Plaza in San Juan on an old postcard

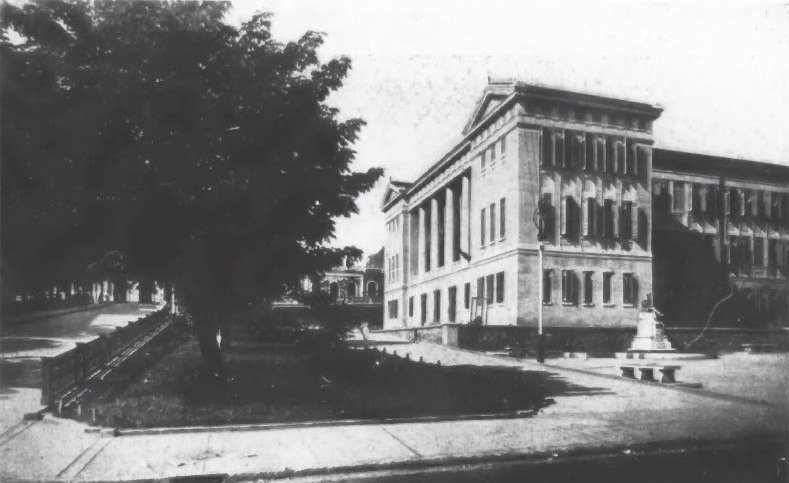
Román Baldorioty de Castro Graded and Technical School in San Juan in 1920

== See also ==
- List of Puerto Ricans
- Politics of Puerto Rico
- Panteon Nacional Roman Baldorioty de Castro
