= Moret Law =

Form of freedom of wombs implemented by Spain in Cuba and Puerto Rico

The Moret Law was a form of freedom of wombs, which was implemented by Spain in Cuba and Puerto Rico, and named after Segismundo Moret who was Spain's Minister of Overseas Territories at the time. This law implemented the abolition of slavery incrementally in Spain's Caribbean colonies. It drew from older Later American manumission traditions such as the way favorite slaves have been previously liberated under certain conditions.

== History ==
Latin America was one of the last holdouts of slavery in the Americas but after the United States Civil War in 1865, international pressure forced Spain to end slavery. Slavery was never formally abolished in Spain itself, but had gradually declined into insignificance there by the early-mid nineteenth century. The Moret Law was approved in Spain on July 4, 1870 for application in Cuba and later Puerto Rico, with other colonies following. This development was mainly attributed to the efforts of Moret, Roman Baldorioty de Castro, Luis Padial, and Julio Vizcarrondo. Spain also passed the law with the desire to preempt the independence movement in the colonies.

The law granted freedom to children born to enslaved mothers after September 18, 1868, a date chosen to honor of the liberal revolution that swept Spain in 1869. The Moret Law was made to not only grant a free womb for enslaved women, but it was also made to ensure that children were not separated from their mothers if they were under 14 years old. The women use the Moret Law for their benefits and to help influence other enslaved women in the neighborhoods where they reside. It also freed slaves who served in the Spanish army (particularly those who fought in the Ten Years' War in Cuba), slaves over 60 years old (along with slaves who turned 60 thereafter), and slaves who were owned by the Spanish government. The Spanish government compensated slave owners 125 pesetas for each slave emancipated under the Moret Law. Slavery was abolished for Puerto Rico (but not for Cuba) in 1873 and finally, without exceptions, in 1886.
