= Luis Padial =

Puerto Rican Army officer

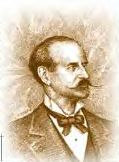
- Brigadier General Luis Padial
- Born: February 6, 1832; San Juan, Puerto Rico
- Died: March 5, 1879 (aged 47); Madrid, Spain
- Military career
- Allegiance: Spanish Army
- Service years: 1851-1863
- Rank: Brigadier General
- Conflicts: Dominican Restoration War

Brigadier General Luis Padial (February 6, 1832 – March 5, 1879), was a soldier, politician and one of the most important figures who was responsible for the abolition of slavery in Puerto Rico.

== Early years ==
Padial, (birth name: Luis Padial y Vizcarrondo), was born into a well-to-do family from San Juan, the capital city of Puerto Rico. He received his primary and secondary education in some of the city's best private schools. After he graduated from superior school (another name for high school), his parents sent him off to Toledo, Spain, where he was to prepare himself to become a career soldier.

== Military career ==
Padial attended the Military Academy of Toledo and was commissioned a Lieutenant in the Spanish Army upon his graduation. He was stationed in Puerto Rico in 1863, when a pro-independence rebellion occurred in the Dominican Republic, which Spain had reannexed two years prior. Padial's battalion was deployed with the intention of "squashing" the rebellion. He was badly wounded in a skirmish and was sent back to Puerto Rico to recover from his wounds. Padial had been a witness of the cruel treatment that the Dominicans had suffered in the hands of the Spaniards and became convinced that their quest for independence was a noble and just one. After he recovered from his wounds, Padial became an active and outspoken person on behalf of the cause of the Dominican Republic. This led to his deportation from Puerto Rico by orders of the Spanish Governor of the island, General Messina, in December 1864.

Padial went to Spain and joined the liberals, who wanted to overthrow the Spanish Monarchy of Queen Isabella II and establish a republic. The rebels were under the command of General Primm. Padial organized an attack from Portugal in 1866 and another from France in 1867. In 1868, the Spanish Monarchy was overthrown and a republic was established. Padial was named Brigadier General of the Battalion of Madrid.

== Abolitionist ==
He returned to the island and in 1869 was elected to represent Puerto Rico in the Spanish Courts. On November 13, 1869, Padial sent a letter to the Minister of the Overseas Department, Segismundo Moret, to consider granting Puerto Rico more autonomy and to abolish slavery in Puerto Rico using Canada as a model.

On November 19, 1872, Padial together with Roman Baldorioty de Castro, Julio Vizcarrondo and Minister Segismundo Moret, presented a second proposal for the abolition of slavery. On March 22, 1873, the Spanish Government approved the proposal which became known as the Moret Law.

== Later years ==
In 1874, Padial went into a self-imposed exile in Switzerland, when the Spanish Monarchy returned to power. Padial returned to Spain in January 1879 and died on March 5, 1879, in Madrid.

== See also ==
- List of Puerto Ricans
- List of Puerto Rican military personnel
