= Gabriel de la Concepción Valdés =

Cuban poet and revolutionary (1809–1844)

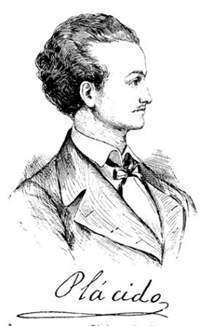
- Born: Diego Gabriel de la Concepción Valdés; 18 March 1809; Havana, Captaincy General of Cuba, Spanish Empire
- Died: 28 June 1844 (aged 35); Matanzas, Captaincy General of Cuba, Spanish Empire
- Occupations: Poet; Writer
- Writing career
- Pen name: Plácido
- Language: Spanish

Gabriel de la Concepción Valdés (March 18, 1809 – June 28, 1844), also known as Plácido, was a Cuban poet and revolutionary.

== Early life and education ==
Diego Gabriel de la Concepción Valdés was born of Afro-Cuban descent on March 18, 1809, in the city of Havana, Spanish Cuba.

He was born to Diego Ferrer y Matoso, a free mulatto barber who attended stage performers, and Concepcion Vazquez, a traveling actress from Burgos, Spain. The Spanish dancer had been performing at a Havana theater, where his father was employed. Before he was one month old, his mother left him at a foundling asylum, which took him in.

Brought up in the Real Casa de Maternidad, he was baptized with the surname Valdés, as was customary for children from the home. He was taken from the asylum by his father, who then gave him a modest and stable home for some years. Gabriel looked after himself after his father died young. His early years were spent with his paternal grandmother.

Valdés found a mentor in Francisco Placido, a Havana druggist, who taught him to read, lent him books, and provided space and materials to write in his drugstore. He received his first formal education from Don Pedro del Sol, a Cuban schoolmaster, at 10 years old. At 12, he began drawing lessons with Vicente Escobar. He began learning typography and working in Jose Severino Boloña's printshop at 14. While learning the printing trade, his knack for writing, particularly verses for specific occasions, caught the shop owner's attention. A year later, the owner printed a sonnet by Valdés that was warmly received and widely distributed. Eventually he left the printery to pursue the trade of comb making.

== Career ==
His literary talent attracted the attention of poets and professionals. He soon began moonlighting as a scribe in various commercial offices, saving money to buy books. While working as a typesetter and making tortoiseshell combs in Havana, he wrote poetry.

=== Plácido ===
By the time Valdés turned 16, he was already known in Havana as a poet under the pseudonym "Plácido," a name commonly used when referring to his verses. His early poetry had found its way into the periodicals of major cities across the Island of Cuba and South America.

He moved to Matanzas in 1826, where he was warmly received at literary gatherings. During this time, he frequently visited Havana. Returning to his hometown in 1832, he continued his trade as a comb maker.

Valdés entered a poetry contest honoring Francisco Martínez de la Rosa, outshining 12 other writers with his impassioned reading of "La Siempreviva". The ode appeared in a 1834 tribute book for the Prime Minister of Spain. The poem circulated in Havana and reached the prime minister, who was so moved he extended a personal invitation to Madrid. As "La Siempreviva" grew in popularity, Plácido gained favor with literary circles. Distinguished Cuban men began to notice him, writers welcomed him warmly, and noblewomen memorized his poems. Having learned French, he began to explore its literature deeply.

Plácido's verses were then published in La Aurora de Matanzas. He wrote daily poems for the periodical under contract, each earning him around 82 cents. He also featured in Tiburcio Campe's El Pasatiempo, and was widely reprinted in the Cuban press.

Valdés became more politically engaged after Captain-General Miguel Tacón suppressed a Creole liberal independence movement in the mid-1830s. The outcome was increased colonial repression. His poetic works reflected the revolutionary outcry against injustice and Spanish oppression. He faced imprisonment in 1834 for a satirical piece directed at the young Queen of Spain Isabella II. Spanish authorities closely examined his lyrics for sedition, and he had frequent difficulties with them from 1834 until his death.

By 1836, he had gained such renown that José María Heredia y Heredia visited him upon returning to Cuba that year.

Valdés left Havana around 1836, and after some time in Villa Clara as a poetry writer and comb maker, he returned to Matanzas. Prior to his return to Matanzas, he wrote a number of poems that showed his broad interest in international struggles and solidarity with weaker nations under domination. Among them were "To Greece," "To Poland," "A Tear of Blood," "To Venice," and "The Pirate." In Santa Clara, he edited the paper El Eco de Villa Clara, where he published his patriotic sonnet, "The Oath."

His first poetry collection was published in Matanzas in 1838. Following Heredia's 1839 death, Plácido emerged among the leaders of the Cuban brand of romanticism, alongside José Jacinto Milanés and Gertrudis Gómez de Avellaneda. The Cuban writer was also a contemporary of Juan Francisco Manzano and Antonio Medina y Céspedes.

== Conspiración de la Escalera ==
He and his companions faced accusations in February 1844 of planning to incite a revolt among Blacks enslaved by Spanish inhabitants. Valdés and ten others were arrested by the military government for the conspiracy known as the Conspiración de la Escalera, accused of forming the General Junta. Identified as president of the leading conspiratorial body, Valdés was joined by James Pimienta as treasurer, Thomas Vargas as general, and Andrew J. Dodge as ambassador.

After four months in La Vigía fortress, 32 charges were brought against him. His poem "The Oath" and his Cuban birth with intelligence were used to charge him. Valdés, the leading figure behind "the conspiracy devised by the people of color in this city for the extermination of the white population," was put before a military tribunal.

=== Execution ===
On June 15, 1844, all 11 men were sentenced to execution by firing squad, a ruling affirmed on June 22 and carried out early on June 28. He wrote three poems prior to his execution, including a sonnet to his mother, an epitaph titled "Adiós a mi Lira," and his famed "Plegaría a Dios" (Prayer to God).

Alongside his fellow accused, he passed the afternoon and night before his execution in the chapel reserved for the condemned, with 11 priests providing last rites. Led into a church cloaked in black and dimly illuminated, they each faced their own coffin as the priests in black robes chanted the service of the dead in sepulchral voices. The accused chief conspirator walked out of the chapel cool and composed, crucifix in hand.

While being led to the execution site, he recited "Plegaría a Dios," for the masses who lined the road. In the poem, he appeals to God as a witness to his innocence. The public execution took place at Plaza de la Libertad in Matanzas. Following orders, he sat on a bench with his back to the gunmen, and preparations for his execution proceeded rapidly. When his final moment came, he stood and declared, "Adieu, O world; here is no pity for me. Soldiers, fire!" Valdés was hit but not killed by the initial gunfire. As onlookers whispered in horror, he rose and turned toward the troops with remarkable courage. "Will no one have pity on me? Here!" he cried, pointing to his heart. "Fire here!" He was shot two more times and killed by the reserve guard. It was reported in The Liberator that the persons executed were Valdés, Jorge Lopez Santiago Pimienta, Jose Miguel Roman, Andres Dodge, Pedro Torres, Manuel Quinones, Antonio Abad, Jose de la O., and two others. 1844 became known in Cuban history as the Year of the Lash.

== Personal life ==
In 1841, Valdés married Maria Gil Romona (Morales).

== Death ==
Gabriel de la Concepción Valdés died at 35 on June 28, 1844, in Matanzas, Spanish Cuba.

== Legacy ==
Gabriel de la Concepción Valdés was known as the leader of a Cuban literary movement known as "ciboneyismo," a form of Indianismo.

Valdés was made the protagonist in Cirilo Villaverde's 1843 novel "The Carved Comb" (Spanish: La peineta calada).

"Poesías de Plácido," a collection of Plácido’s complete poems edited by Francisco Javier Vingut, was published in New York in 1855.

To honor the 100th anniversary of his death in 1944, Cuba announced a commemorative stamp with his image. Issued in 1946, the stamp had a 2-centavo value and was red with the words "Gloria de las Poesía Cubana, Mártir de la Libertad."

== Works ==
- A Grecia
- A Polonia
- A una Hermosa (To A Beautiful Woman)
- A Venecia
- A Villa-Clara
- Despedida a Mi Madre (English translation by William Cullen Bryant)
- El hijo de la maldición (Son of damnation)
- El Juramento (The Oath)
- La Envidia
- La Fatalidad
- La Flor de Pina
- La Flor del Cafe
- Jicoténcal
- Muerto de Gesler (The Death of Gesler)
- Plegaría a Dios (English translation)
