= Anselmo Suárez y Romero =

Cuban writer and novelist

- Born: c. 1818
- Died: 1878
- Writing career
- Notable work: Francisco: el ingenio o las delicias del campo.
- Literary movement: Romanticism

Anselmo Suárez y Romero (c. 1818 – 1878) was a Cuban writer and novelist, better known for the first novel in Spanish about slavery in the Americas: Francisco, based largely on "Autobiografía de un esclavo" by Juan Francisco Manzano (1835), the first autobiography written in Spanish by a slave.

== Life ==
Suárez y Romero was educated in his native city, where he devoted himself to teaching and contributing to public education.

- His literary career began with Una noche de retreta, Un viejo impertinente, Un recuerdo, followed by the publication of Biografía de Carlota Valdés (1838) (English: Biography of Carlota Valdés).
- Between 1838 and 1839, he writes the novel Francisco which would be published forty years later.
- In 1859, followed by a series of masterly sketches and descriptions of Cuban scenery and customs, Colección de Artículos(English: Collection of articles) is published.
- In that same year he was admitted into the Law Bar Association.
- In 1862, some of his works, mostly essays about public education and school reform were published in Havana.
- In 1870, Cartas críticas sobre asuntos jurídicos was published.
- In 1880, the novel Francisco, which depicted Cuban slavery, is published in Spanish.

== Literary career ==
Anselmo Suárez y Romero's masterpiece: Francisco, also known as El ingenio o las delicias del campo (The sugar mill or the delights of the country), written between 1838 and 1839, is considered the first anti-slavery novel in the Americas. The other work which encompassed slavery, was the short story Petrona y Rosalía written in 1838 by Félix Tanco y Bosmeniel (1797–1871), unpublished until 1925, which also touched upon slaves' lives in the 19th century.

Based largely on accounts from "Autobiografía de un esclavo", the autobiography written by Juan Francisco Manzano years before, and which was published later in England, the novel Francisco set out the way for other literary works to follow: Cecilia Valdés by Cirilo Villaverde began in 1839, Sab by Gertrudis Gómez de Avellaneda in 1841, El Ranchador by Pedro José Morillas in 1856, Antonio Zambrana's El negro Francisco in 1873, and Alejo Carpentier's ¡Ecué-Yambá! in 1933.

Written years before Uncle Tom's Cabin, Francisco could not be published immediately due to colonial censorship. The manuscript was delivered to British official and abolitionist Richard Robert Madden in 1840, along with a revised copy of the work Autobiografía de un esclavo (English: Autobiography of a slave) by Juan Francisco Manzano, which had been proofread by Suárez y Romero himself.

About the importance of Francisco as a literary masterpiece, British abolitionist Madden was quoted as saying that:

Tho there is literary merit of but small amount in this piece, there is life and truth in every line of it. [...] In this little piece of the Ingenio there is a minuteness of description and closeness of observation and a rightness of feeling that I have not often seen surpassed.

Madden himself thought that the narrative employed by Suárez y Romero in Francisco had a palpable realm of invisible realism in it. No other book, in his opinion, was as descriptive, or as graphically drafted, as in Francisco 's prose, in which slavery was depicted with the same intellectual rigor as in real life in Cuba. Madden found certain parts of the book originally narrated, in a prose style by which Suárez y Romero was known for, especially when the central figure in the book, still shackled after being injured by lashes, had to endure the humid heat in a mistreated and painful state, while harvesting sugar cane.

Most of the early readers of Francisco agreed with Madden in that the book had a realistic and accurate representation not before seen.

Others, like the critic Enrique Piñeyro, thought that the book was unoriginal. His opinion would appear in the periodical El Ateneo in Havana, and later in Revista Cubana.

== Bibliography ==
- Suárez y Romero, Anselmo (1859). Colección de artículos de Anselmo Suárez y Romero. Establecimiento tip. La Antilla. pp. 278.
- Suárez y Romero, Anselmo; José Ignacio Rodríguez (1864). Ofrenda al bazar de la Real Casa de Beneficencia. Imprenta del Tiempo. p. 203.
- Suárez y Romero, Anselmo (1880). Francisco. N. Ponce de León. p. 156.
