= Félix Tanco =

Cuban writer, poet and novelist

Félix Tanco y Bosmeniel
- Born: Félix Manuel de Jesús Tanco y Bosmeniel; January 28, 1797; Bogotá, Colombia
- Died: 1871 (aged 73–74); New York
- Writing career
- Notable work: Petrona y Rosalía

Félix Tanco y Bosmeniel (January 28, 1797 – 1871) was a Cuban writer, poet and novelist. He is better known for the first fictional story about slavery in the Americas: Petrona y Rosalía.

== Life ==
Born Félix Manuel de Jesús Tanco y Bosmeniel in Bogotá, Colombia, he arrived in Cuba at a very young age.

He was considered the most radical writer of the epoch speaking against the injustices committed by the colonial government. He wrote at length against slavery and the despotic treatment that many blacks suffered under its authoritarian rule.

In the narrative of his masterpiece Petrona y Rosalía, he spoke about the cruelty inflicted onto the slaves by the ruling master class that was backed by the colonial government. He spoke against the white elitism that predominated in society, which was always protected by a group with special interests in the promulgation and the expansion of the slave trade.

In 1834, while speaking up against the social inequities, Tanco was charged in the judicial court by Governor Miguel Tacón y Rosique for writing an article about slavery. The article had been published in the literary magazine La Aurora de Matanzas that same year. In the article, Tanco respectfully urged the Governor to eradicate, among other things, gambling, bribes, and the slave trade. The governor thought that the article was an insult to his authoritative rank, so he charged him with insubordination against the government.

== Bibliography ==
- Tanco, Félix (1833). Ignacio Herrera Davila (ed.). Rimas Americanas. Imprenta de Palmer.
- Tanco Bosmeniel, Félix M. (1870). Portable y definitivo porvenir de la isla de Cuba. p. 15.
- Tanco Bosmeniel, Félix M. (1980). Petrona y Rosalia. Editorial Letras Cubanas. p. 48.
- Salvador Bueno, ed. (1975). Cuentos Cubanos del siglo XIX. Petrona y Rosalia: Editorial Arte y Literatura.
- Manuel Mesa Rodriguez, ed. (1957). Centón Epistolario de Domingo del Monte, VII (1823–1843). Epistolario de Félix Tanco y Bosmeniel a Domingo del Monte: Editorial La Habana:imprenta de "El Siglo XX". p. 198.

== Literary criticism of Félix Tanco's publications ==
- Bueno, Salvador (1988). Cuadernos Hispanoamericanos. La novela antiesclavista en Cuba de 1835 a 1839. p. 169.
- El negro en la novela hispanoamericana. La primitiva narración antiesclavista en Cuba de 1835 a 1839: Editorial Letras Cubanas. 1986.
- Escoto, José Augusto (1916). Revista Histórica Crítíca y Bibliográfica de Literatura Cubana. Félix Manuel Tanco adversario de José de la Luz en la polémica sobre el Eclecticismo. p. 408.
- Ghorbal, Karim (2012). "Un radical discret : l'esclavage dans la pensée singulière de Félix Tanco Bosmeniel". Mélanges de la Casa de Velázquez. 42 (1): 227–249. doi:10.4000/mcv.4428.
- Williams, Luis (1990). Literary Bondage. Slavery in Cuban narrative. University of Texas Press.
- Mesa Rodriguez, Manuel I. (1957). Centón Epistolario de Domingo del Monte (1823–1843). Partida bautismal de Félix Manuel Tanco y Bosmeniel: Editorial La Habana:imprenta de "El Siglo XX".
- Schulman, Iván A. (1977). Homenaje a Lydia Cabrera. Tanco y la literatura antiesclavista: Barcelona; Ediciones Universal. p. 317.
- Triana y Antorveza, Humberto (2005). Boletín de Historia y Antigüedades. Dos colombianos en Cuba:José Fernández Madrid y Félix Manuel Tanco Bosmeniel. p. 65.
- Ibáñez, Pedro María (1907). Boletín de Historia y Antigüedades. Bocetos biográficos. p. 574.
- Rodríguez-Arenas, Flor María (1993). Petrona y Rosalía. Félix Manuel Tanco y Bosmeniel.
- Rodríguez-Arenas, Flor María (1996). "Folios:Revista de la Facultad de Humanidades, Universidad Pedagógica Nacional". Literatura colombiana y de colombianos (Colonia y Siglo XIX): 55.
