= Domingo del Monte =

Cuban writer, lawyer, arts patron and literary critic

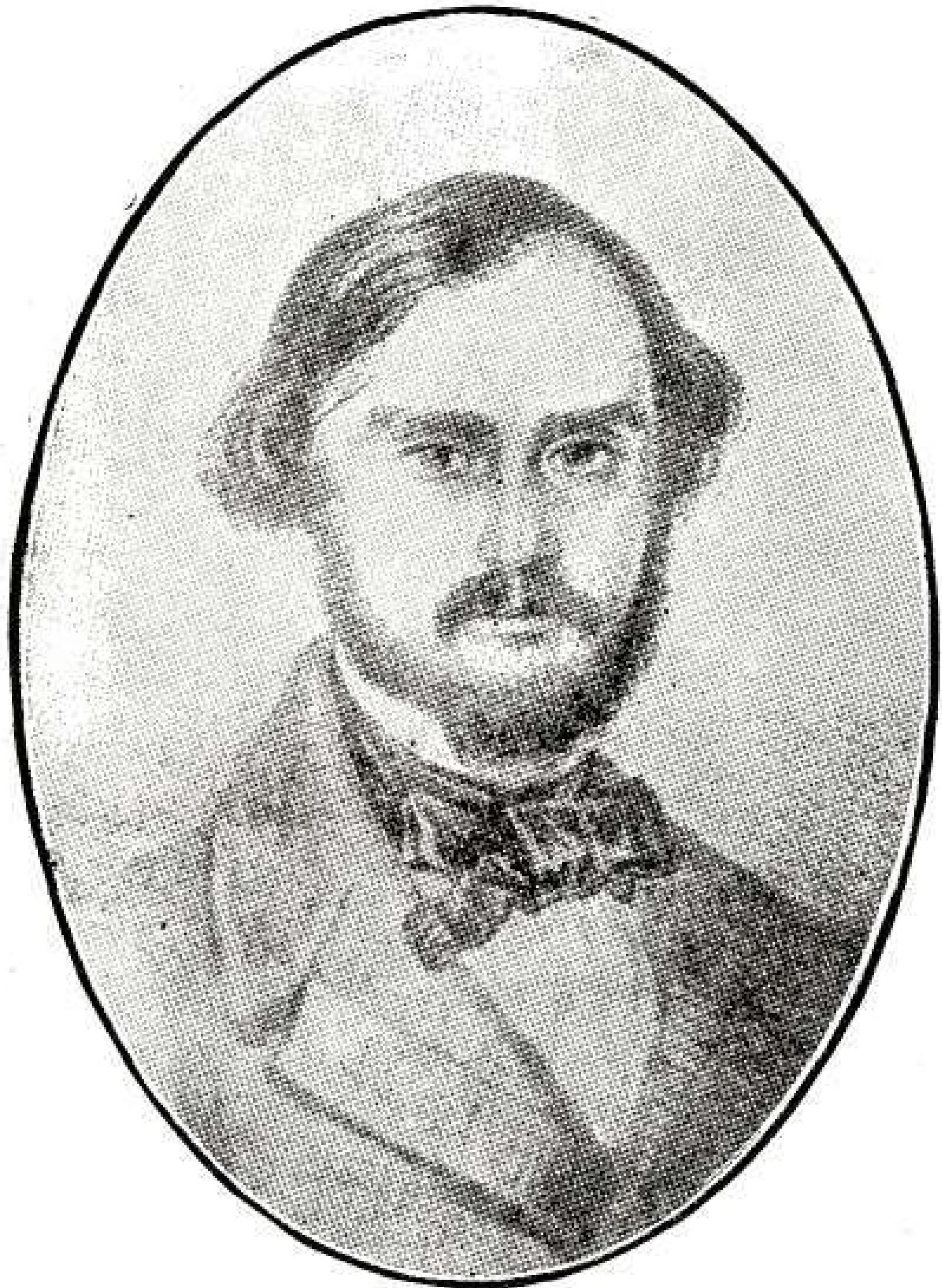
- Born: Domingo del Monte y Aponte; August 4, 1804; Viceroyalty of New Granada
- Died: November 4, 1853 (aged 49); Spain
- Known for: Literary critic

Domingo del Monte (August 4, 1804 — November 4, 1853) was a writer, lawyer, arts patron, and literary critic, known primarily for contributing to Cuban literature and advocating for public education throughout the country.

== Life ==
Born in Maracaibo, Viceroyalty of New Granada, the child of a wealthy family, his parents were Leonardo del Monte y Medrano, an assistant and Lieutenant for the Governor in that city native of the colony of Santo Domingo, and Rosa Aponte y Sánchez, the daughter and heir of a known and influential planter.

Del Monte attended preschool while living in Venezuela, before his parents moved to Dominican Republic, and thereafter to Cuba in 1810. A few years later, when Del Monte was a twelve-year-old, his parents enrolled him into the Seminary of San Carlos, a catholic alma mater of Leonardo Gamboa in the city of Havana. He completed studies at the University of Havana and right after graduation, around the 1820s, he had a notable influence as an associate for a prominent lawyer in Havana, who shortly after, financed a trip throughout Europe and the United States for the young Del Monte.

In April 1834, Del Monte married Rosa Aldama, the daughter of a wealthy planter named Miguel de Aldama. He proposed marriage to her on the Philharmonic Society salon. Rosa's father was Domingo de Aldama y Arechaga, ranked as the twelfth richest in an 1836 survey of the most wealthiest Cubans.

=== Career ===
On his return to Cuba, Del Monte was the founder for several literary magazines. He also joined prestigious congregations like the Economic Society of the Country's Friends, an intellectual inner circle for the wealthy elite and one in which members, planters themselves were also the publishers for the first significant newspaper in Cuba, El papel periódico de La Habana.

With a vast education that had been successfully completed at the University of Havana, he began mentoring and promoting young Cuban writers.

As a patron of letters, Del Monte helped and supported most of the writers during that period. He promoted literature tirelessly by donating books to institutions and loaning books to friends. He established a public library in Matanzas in 1835. As an advocate for the promulgation of Cuban culture, he organized meetings which would be held at his house, and where important figures, like José Jacinto Milanés, Anselmo Suárez y Romero, and Cirilo Villaverde would later attend, to discuss topics like literature, and other issues related to social reform, and the autonomy of the country.

The period between 1830 and 1840 has been considered as the Golden Age of literature in Cuba. No other intellectual of the period was as influential as Del Monte. He was in the middle of the flourishing of the Romanticism movement throughout Cuba, which included the best exponents of the epoch.

He auspices, among other writers, Juan Francisco Manzano, whom he meets in 1830. Still a slave, and whose freedom was attainable only later, on July 23, 1836, through the funds that were raised by Del Monte's group.

Manzano's talent as an outspoken author was impressive. Del Monte helped him and promoted all his works, after considering him as one of the best writers in Cuba. In 1831 Del Monte published Manzano's first poem Al nacimiento de la Infanta María Isabel de Luisa de Borbón "On the birth of the Infanta María Isabel de Luisa de Borbón" in the literary magazine La Moda, followed by other poems in Diario de la Habana, and also in other periodicals like El Aguinaldo Habanero and El album.

Del Monte accomplished the publication of Manzano's masterpiece. In 1839 the manuscript Autobiography of a slave (1839) (Spanish: Autobiografía de un esclavo) was published in England, through a British official by the name of Richard Robert Madden, an abolitionist, who after corresponding through letters with Del Monte, showed an interest to include Manzano's work in an antislavery tract soon to be published.

During his career, Del Monte wrote some poetry, but most of his works were written in a prose style that differed from most of the popular writers of the epoch. He was known though, as the founding voice for pamphlet writing and short circulations, especially those that consisted and were based on political discourse arguments, in which his authorial presence had an influential impact. In 1836 for example, he wrote a critique titled La Isla de Cuba tal cual está, against the administration of Miguel Tacón. The critique was a refute to a pamphlet written by Guerra Bethancourt, (former professor of Milanés), who had praised the government. The response by Del Monte paved the way for other political tracts to denounce the decisions taken by the government. In 1837, José Antonio Saco, another writer, wrote a tract about the English colonies and the republic of Cuba. His main argument consisted of the advantages of Cuba with Britain or the United States.

Although Del Monte's group consisted of writers mainly from the Romanticism movement, the narratives they employed in their writings, even though constructed from a fictional perspective, they were seen as a threat and an instigation to the colonial government. Most of the non-fictional works, like Manzano's autobiography could only be published overseas years later, through the abolitionist Richard Robert Madden in England. Del Monte nonetheless would always encourage them to write from a Realism's stance, so as a result slavery could be depicted accurately, and that way advocacy for the antislavery movement could advance under the colonial regime.

Del Monte and other contemporary writers like Félix Varela, José Antonio Saco, and José de la Luz y Caballero, identified themselves as autonomous nationalists. Most of them envisioned a Cuba without black or mixed Cuban races. In that sense they all had patriarchal beliefs. For them being Cuban implied being a Catholic, as well as an exclusive descendant from white Spaniards, since the rest of the peoples, those of mixed and black races were just uncultured.

For Del Monte though, the solution for economic advancement lied in suppressing slavery, by either repatriating African blacks or by gradually ceasing the black slave trade that was in effect at the time. On October 17, 1848, he wrote a letter stating his opinions where he said:

… that the purpose of every Cuban should be in terminate the slave trade, and then, insensibly, the slavery, without upheaval or violence; and finally,… cleanse Cuba of the African race.

For Del Monte, the development of Cuba as an autonomous country had to come from within, but only through the direct involvement of white Cubans in the affairs of the country. That is, Del Monte was neither in favor of yielding Cuba's autonomy under Spanish rule, nor in favor of annexation under the United States. In both cases, in his opinion, the black race would become the majority group, and as a result, would run the country either under Spanish or Anglo-American authority. In Del Monte's view, white Cubans' involvement in governmental affairs was tantamount to the autonomy of Cuba. On October 18, 1848, he wrote a letter from Spain, wherein he clearly stated that:

I am not for the annexation to the United States. To do so, Cuba must become a war field: on one side the combatants would be criollos and Anglo-americans, on the other, Spaniards and Englishmen, and in the background, lingering, the Blacks. Result: the Spaniards lose their colony, and the Cubans lose their land. Cuba then would be declared an independent black republic, under the protectorate of England and the United States.

Yo no estoy por el plan de agregación a los Estados Unidos. Para realizarlo, sería preciso hacer a Cuba campo de batalla: los combatientes serían por un lado criollos y anglo-americanos, por otro españoles é ingleses. Al fondo, en expectativa, negros. Resultado: los españoles se quedan sin su Colonia: los Cubanos sin su tierra: Cuba sería declarado república negra independiente, bajo el protectorado de Inglaterra y los Estados Unidose.

In 1838, even though Del Monte ideals about black slave trade was that of an abolitionist, as a planter and slave owner, his beliefs were still pro-slavery. He seemed to admire both governments of the United States and England. He was quoted as saying that:

It is an irrefutable fact that the United States of America has, since its founding, enjoyed the greatest political liberty, and they still have slaves.

(Note: Most of the sources have agreed upon the conclusion that Del Monte was in favor of abolition, and against and annexation by either Spain or the United States, as stated in his own letters. See for example Cartas de Domingo del Monte. Also around the same year, Del Monte looked forward to establish an anti-annexationist newspaper. See for example Martínez-Fernández, p. 17) (Note: It is not so clear, however, his annexationist thoughts with regards to Great Britain, since in a letter written in March 1845 he praised the advancements by that country and did not discard the possibility of annexation.)

In the same year however, while Del Monte lived in Spain and with the help of some of the friends from Cuba, he looked forward to establish an anti-annexationist newspaper that should be:

monarchical-religious-constitutional; moderate, but bordering on absolutism.

In that sense Del Monte's beliefs leaned more toward an assimilationist Europhile than an annexationist.

In 1838, José Zacarías González del Valle, a philosopher, professor, and a member of the literary salon group (Spanish: tertulias) which Del Monte founded, and also a close friend of Del Monte who would correspond later with him during the years when Del Monte lived in Spain, said that the group, of which he also was part of: "consisted of young men imbued with the principles of liberty, equality, and fraternity, who exchanged books and ideas in a clandestine manner, and who dedicated their noble and generous hearts to end the slave trade and slavery."

=== Conspiracy of La Escalera ===
Del Monte was in the center of the conspiracy of La Escalera (1844) English: Ladder Conspiracy. He was accused, along with José de la Luz y Caballero, and Félix Tanco, of conspiring with black slaves to revolt against the colonial government. The conspiracy was an uprising among black slaves to denounce the injustices by the government, and against the sanctions imposed upon them by the colonial authorities. Many of the slaves were savagely tortured, while others, like "Plácido", were killed.

1844 was known as the Year of the Lash, or "Year of the whip". Spanish: Año del Cuero. The conspiracy acquired its name from a wooden ladder where slaves would be strapped into, and henceforth punished by whipping.

Although there is speculation whether the revolt was indeed a conspiracy or just an excuse from the government to inflict despotism onto the black population, it is a fact that the rebellion, which started in 1843, erupted in Cárdenas in March of that year, and in Matanzas, in November, throughout sugar mills (Spanish: ingenios) in both municipalities. (Note: The number of sources that discuss the Escalera Conspiracy is limited. The facts remain unclear. Most of the works reference the book by Robert L. Paquette Sugar is made with blood: The Conspiracy of La Escalera and the conflict between empires over slavery in Cuba. Published in 1990 by Wesleyan Press.) (Note: In recent years, others have said that the consensus of non-conspiracy no longer exists. And that conspiratorial activities, although not uncovered in the plot as it was originally claimed by colonial authorities, did occur. The suggested sources to consult are nonetheless by Robert L. Paquette. (Sibylle Brouwers-Fischer, 2005 & Oxford University Press))

According to some sources, in December 1843, a white planter in Matanzas, discovered the plot that aimed to overthrow the Spanish government. The serving captain-general Leopoldo O'Donnell was informed in January 1844 about the impending conspiracy that involved not only slaves, but also free people of color, foreigners, and white criollos. He [O'Donnell] ordered extensive interrogation which led to torture by tying those who were believed to be suspects until they would confess. The procedures were conducted not only in Matanzas, but across the country. In that year, Del Monte was forced into exile to avoid being arrested. Others, like the writer Félix Tanco, were imprisoned.

As a white criollo, Domingo del Monte undoubtedly was the most influential intellectual in Cuba at the time. In 1840 he met Alexander Everett in Havana. Everett headed an investigation brought against Nicholas Trist, then U.S. consul in Havana, for being part of the transatlantic slave trade. They corresponded with each other thereafter, and in 1842 Del Monte wrote a letter to Everett, warning him of a conspiracy by slaves to undertake control of the country and possibly to end slavery, with the supposed backing of British abolitionists, and especially of David Turnbull, British consul in Havana from 1841 to 1843, who at the time was living in Jamaica, a safe haven from Spanish forces in Cuba. His assistant, Francis Ross Cocking, was supposedly implicated in the conspiracy, although he was never accused of any wrongdoing. In 1843, Everett forwarded a copy of the letter that Del Monte wrote, to Robert Campbell, U.S. consul in Havana, and to Washington Irving, the U.S. minister in Spain. Irving replied that the Spanish authorities were not concerned, since the forces counted with the capabilities and henceforth were fully prepared to face any uprising. Webster also passed on the information to John Calhoun, who assured him that President John Tyler had been informed on the matter.

== Bibliography ==
- Del Monte, Domingo (1901). Catalogue of the valuable and important library of Spanish books relating to Cuba, Porto Rico, the Philippines, Mexico, South America, and other parts of the American continent and West Indies. J. Anderson. p. 40.
- Del Monte, Domingo (1929). José Antonio Fernández de Castro (ed.). Escritos de Domingo del Monte, Volumes 12-13. Cultural, s. a.
- Del Monte, Domingo (2000). Salvador Bueno (ed.). Ensayos criticos. Pablo de la Torriente Editorial. p. 211.
- Del Monte, Domingo (1936). Humanismo y humanistarismo. Publicaciones de la Secretaria de Educacion, Direccion de Cultura. p. 123.
- Del Monte, Domingo; Hill Everett, Alexander; Andioc Torres, Sophie (1994). Correspondance entre Domingo del Monte et Alexander Everett. The University of Michigan. p. 155.
- Del Monte, Domingo; Ticknor, George (1850). Letter, 1850, Madrid, to George Ticknor, Boston. p. 3.
- Del Monte, Domingo; Gallego, Juan Nicasio (1829). Versos de J. Nicasio Gallego. Imprenta Espanola del Mensajero.
- Del Monte, Domingo (1929). Escritos. Cultural. p. 355.
- Del Monte, Domingo; Castellanos, Jose F.; Villaverde, Cirilo (1947). Del Monte y Villaverde en "Cecilia Valdes". p. 16.
- Del Monte, Domingo (1882). Biblioteca cubana: lista cronológica de los libros inéditos é impresos que se han escrito sobre la isla de Cuba y de los que hablan de la misma desde su descubrimiento y conquista hasta nuestros días, formada en Paris en 1846. La viuda de Soler. p. 50.
- Del Monte, Domingo (1848). Cartas del señor Don Gaspar de Jovellanos, sobre el principado de Asturias dirigida a Don Antonio Ponz, ineditas hasta el día y remitidas a la redacción de las memorias de la Sociedad Económica de la Habana. Imprenta del Faro Industrial. p. 113.
- Del Monte, Domingo; Llaverias y Martinez, Joaquin (1930). Academia de la Historia [de Cuba]. Centon epistolario, Volume 4.
- Del Monte, Domingo; Andioc Torres, Sophie (2002). Centón epistolario: 1833-1835. Imagen contemporanea. ISBN 978-959-7078-46-3.
- Del Monte, Domingo (1877). Great sale of illustrated and standard books: Catalogue of an extensive collection of valuable, important and choice illustrated books ... to be sold by auction, by Messrs. Geo. A. Leavitt & Co. ... May 22, and following days. p. 80.

== Citations ==
- (Martínez-Fernández 2003, p. 17)
- (Portell-Vilá 1969)
- (Barlett Rugemer 2008)
- (Branche 2006)
