= Amphitheatre of Old Havana =

Amphitheatre in Havana, Cuba

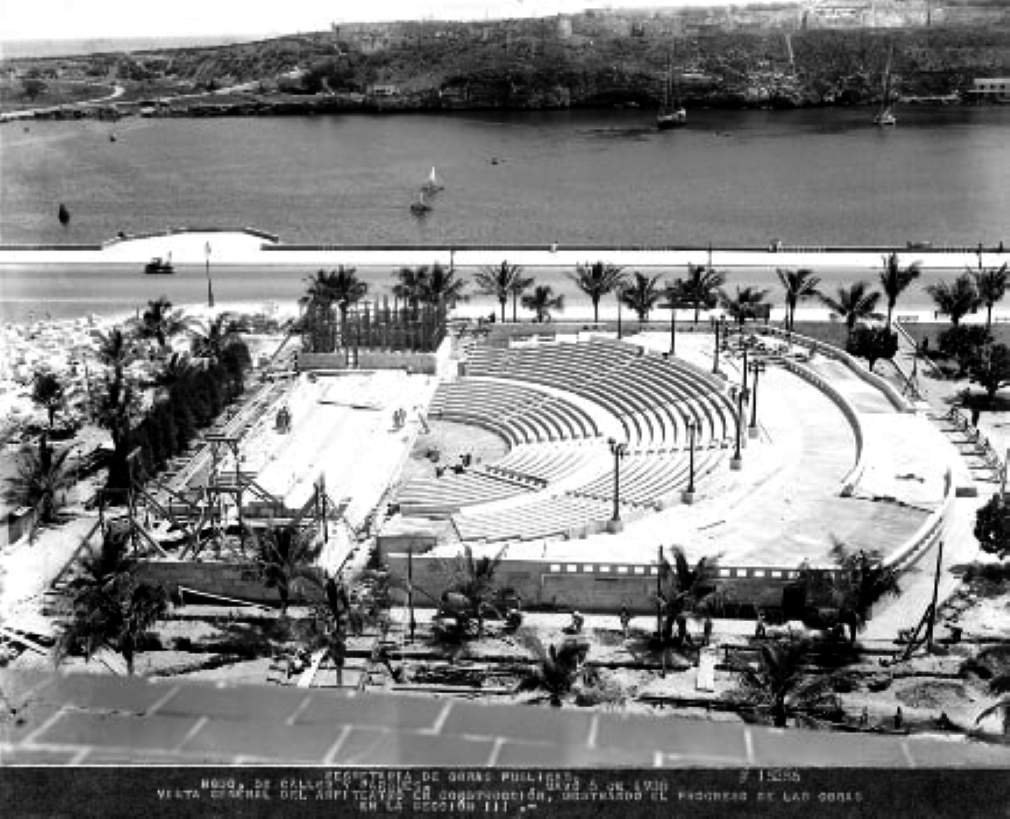
- Interactive map of the Amphitheatre of Old Havana area

General information
- Architectural style: International
- Classification: Theatre
- Location: Avenida del Puerto, Havana, Cuba
- Coordinates: 23.14393°N 82.35350°W
- Groundbreaking: 1936
- Inaugurated: 20 May 1936
- Renovated: 1985
- Owner: City of Havana

Technical details
- Structural system: Load bearing
- Material: Reinfored concrete
- Floor count: 1

Design and construction
- Architects: Eugenio Batista and Aquiles Maza

The Amphitheatre of Old Havana is an outdoor auditorium built by the Secretaría de Obras Públicas in 1936 on the Avenida del Puerto. (Note: Secretaría de Obras Públicas de la Cuba Republicana.)

== History ==
The Amphitheatre of Old Havana was designed by architects Eugenio Batista and Aquiles Maza. It was inaugurated on May 20, 1936, on the Avenida del Puerto, with a concert by the Municipal Band under the direction of maestro Guillermo Tomás. One of the most important events that took place in this coliseum was the revival, in the year of its inauguration, of the Cuban zarzuela Cecilia Valdés, directed by its own author, the Cuban composer Gonzalo Roig. (Note: "Cecilia Valdés is both a novel by the Cuban writer Cirilo Villaverde (1812–1894), and a zarzuela based on the novel. It is a work of importance for its quality, and its revelation of the interaction of classes and races in Havana, Cuba.) Also memorable were the performances by Bertha Singerman, Rita Montaner, Pedro Vargas, Benny Moré and Libertad Lamarque in the 1950s, and the concerts by the National Concert Band, of which the Amphitheater was the official venue until the 1960s. Very popular festivals among Havanans and other artistic events of national and international significance have been held in the center. In 1995, it was the object of restoration by the Heritage Directorate of the City Historian's Office, Eusebio Leal, which restored its original appearance.

== Gallery ==
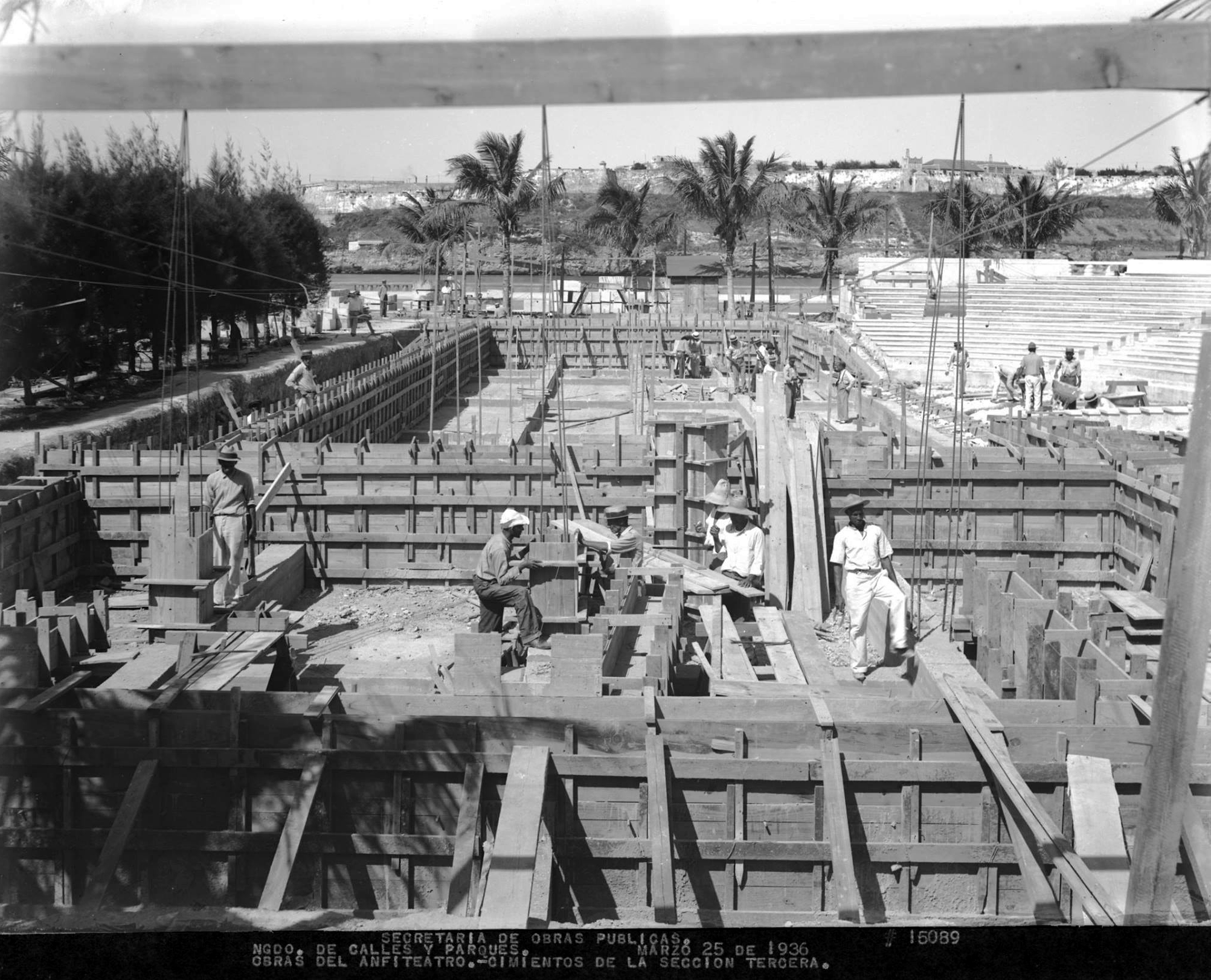

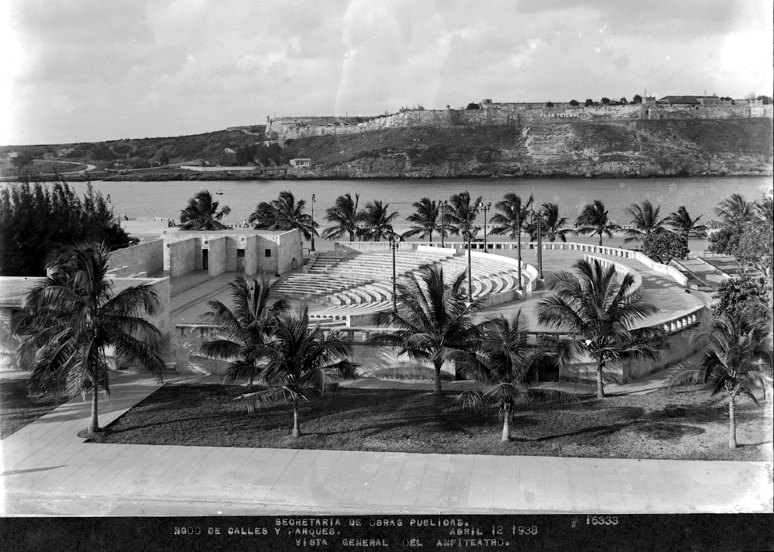

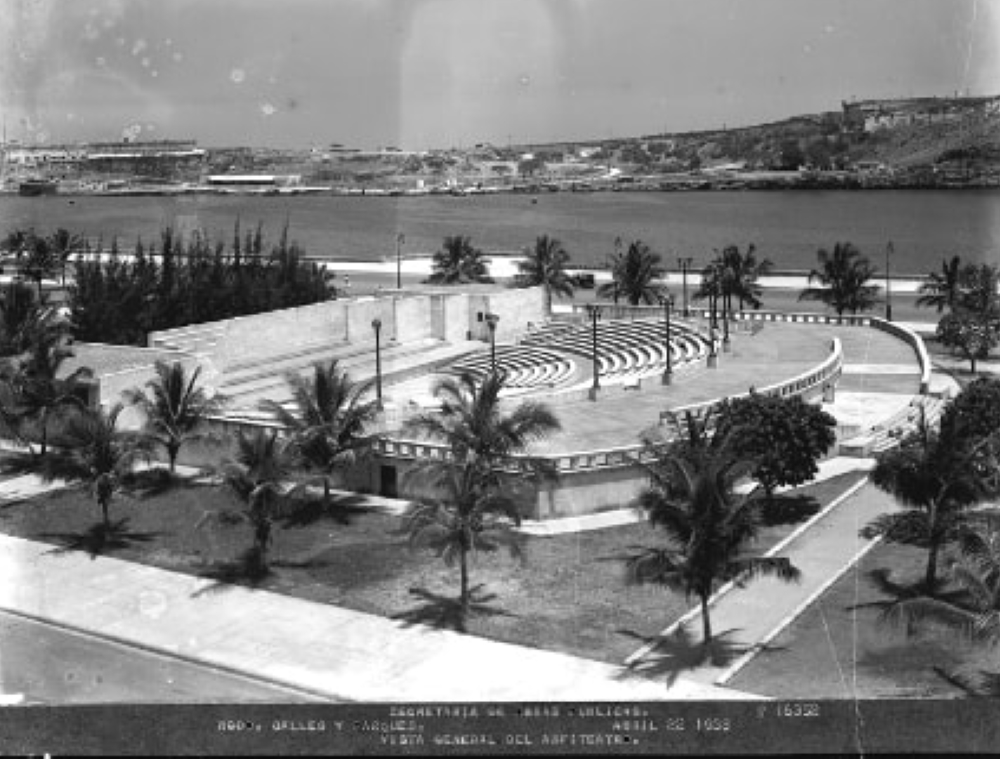

== See also ==
- Havana Plan Piloto
