= Battle of La Ladera (1812) =

1812 battle of the Colombian War of Independence

- Part of Colombian War of Independence
Location	Popayán, Popayán Province, New Granada
Result	Patriot Victory

Belligerents
(Valle del Cauca Department) Confederated Cities of the Cauca Valley	Kingdom of Spain

Commanders and leaders
(Valle del Cauca Department) José María Cabal (Valle del Cauca Department) Alexander Macaulay	(Spain) Antonio Tenorio (Spain) José Joaquín Paz

Strength
300~400 regulars, militias, and volunteers 6 light cannons	1,000~1,500 some regulars and mostly guerrilla

Casualties and losses
Unknown	64 killed, 176 captured, and 26 wounded,

The Battle of La Ladera was a three-day battle in the Colombian War of Independence fought between Neogranadine patriot forces and Spanish royalist forces between April 25 and April 27, 1812, in and around the city of Popayán.

== Background ==
In 1810, various cities throughout the Viceroyalty of New Granada established juntas to govern themselves, removing the Spanish government officials who had previously ruled them. In July 1810, a junta was formed in the city of Cali, representing the six cities of the Valle del Cauca in the northern part of the Popayán Province. This junta formed an alliance with the Santafé Junta, which had been established on July 20, 1810, following a revolt that led to the removal of Viceroy Antonio Amar y Borbon and other royal officials. Both juntas declared independence from the Council of Regency, which was ruling Spain at the time.

The Spanish governor of the province, Miguel Tacón y Rosique, who ruled from the capital in Popayán, threatened to suppress the junta in Cali by force unless they remained loyal to the Council of Regency. The Cali Junta requested military assistance from Santafé, which deployed an expeditionary force to support them. The combined patriot army led by Colonel Antonio Baraya defeated Colonel Tacón and the royalist forces at the Battle of Bajo Palacé, marking the first battle of the Colombian War of Independence.

After their victory, Tacón and the remnants of his army fled south to Pasto, a royalist stronghold. The patriots entered Popayán on April 2, 1811. Thereafter, the Cali Junta was transferred to Popayán, where it formally established the Confederation of Cities of the Cauca Valley, with Joaquín Caycedo y Cuero elected as president. Concerned about a possible royalist counterattack, President Caycedo and the patriot government launched a southern campaign to capture Pasto and defeat Tacón's remaining forces. By early 1812, Pasto had been captured by the patriots, and Caycedo continued his campaign further south, hoping to reach Quito. Meanwhile, Tacón had fled to the Pacific coast but was defeated by the patriots at the Battle of Iscuandé. However, he managed to escape and sailed to Peru.

=== Royalist guerrilla uprising ===
Despite the royalist army's defeat, strong royalist sentiment remained in southern New Granada, leading to the emergence of royalist guerrillas in remote areas of the south. Many of these guerrillas hailed from the Patia Valley, an area which lays in between Pasto and Popayán. Frustrated by the pressure from the patriot offensives, these guerrillas sought to strike back. They gathered approximately 1,000–1,500 troops at the Río Hondo hacienda and devised a plan to attack and capture Popayán.

At this meeting, the Alférez real, Antonio Tenorio, a nobleman from Popayán who had served under Governor Tacón at the Battle of Bajo Palacé, was self proclaimed Governor of the Popayán in the name of King Ferdinand VII, while guerrilla leader José Joaquín Paz was named Commander General of the royalist forces. Commander Paz divided the army into five companies, each led by:

- Juan José Caycedo, commanding the northern forces
- Casimiro Casanova, commanding the southern forces
- Vicente Parra, in charge of the Quilcasé forces
- Silvestre López, leading the Tambo forces
- Captain Manuel Serralde, commanding a unit of Volunteers of the King, which included soldiers from various backgrounds

This improvised royalist force then set out for Popayán. Before launching the attack, and while en route to the city, Tenorio sent a written ultimatum to the patriots to surrender the city.

=== Patriot forces ===
This royalist uprising had caught the patriots by surprise, upon hearing word of the uprising President Caycedo having failed in his campaign marched north at once with him was most of the patriot army but they were sill hundreds of kilometers away from Popayán. Other patriots units were also stationed on the pacific coast, thus Popayán was only lightly defended by approximately 300–400 troops, consisting of regulars, militia, and volunteers. This garrison was under the command of Colonel José María Cabal, a delegate to the confederation and one of its founders. Cabal had been placed in command of the city after President Caycedo departed with the army to the south. Apart from Cabal, the other patriot officers were Lieutenant Colonels José María Quijano, Mariano Matute, and Juan Gregorio Hoyos, as well as Captains Pedro José Murgueitio and Rafael Cuervo. Despite having fewer troops, the patriots had the advantage of possessing more rifles—around 428—as well as artillery, which included two culverins and four light cannons. In contrast, the royalists had only approximately 128 firearms at their disposal, with most of their troops armed with lances and swords.

== Battle ==
On April 25, the royalist forces appeared on the western outskirts of the city, having arrived from the town of El Tambo. From there, Commander Paz deployed his forces to various points to surround the city. A cavalry company was sent to secure the Cauca Royal Bridge to cut off the city from the road leading to the Cauca Valley in the north.

The following day, on April 26, they were ordered to attack the city and managed to enter the city center through the San Francisco neighborhood. Colonel Cabal and his officers positioned their troops throughout the city streets, setting up barricades with artillery placed behind them. They received the royalist troops with heavy fire from their artillery, while patriot troops fired from windows and balconies, keeping the enemy at bay. As a result, Captain Manuel Serralde, commander of the Volunteers of the King infantry company, was killed in the street-to-street fighting. The defensive fire was so intense that by nightfall, Paz was forced to withdraw his forces to the southern outskirts of the city. During the night, the royalists attempted to set fire to some of the houses in the city.

That same night, an American doctor and former U.S. Army officer, Alexander Macaulay, who happened to be in the city at the time, offered his services to the patriot government, which immediately commissioned him into their army. Macaulay proposed to Colonel Cabal that they conduct a surprise attack on the enemy camp in the southern outskirts of the city. Cabal approved the plan and gave Macaulay command of approximately 400 troops.

On April 27, around 5 a.m., Macaulay and the 400 patriot troops departed the city in search of the enemy camp. The royalists had positioned their troops in the area known as La Ladera, located outside the city, and to the north, near the Cauca Royal Bridge. Macaulay's forces surprised the royalists at their camp in La Ladera. After about an hour of intense combat, the royalists were forced to flee, and the patriots returned to the city victorious at 7 a.m. Macaulay then immediately marched his force north to defeat the royalists still guarding the Cauca Royal Bridge, successfully dispersing them. Later, he also routed a small royalist contingent at an area known as Chuni.

With his forces defeated, Commander Paz was forced to withdraw to the town of El Tambo, with some patriot units in pursuit.

== Aftermath ==
As a result of the battle, the royalists suffered around 64 killed among them Captain Serralde, 176 captured, and 26 wounded. Patriot losses are harder to calculate but were considered light. The appearance of Macaulay was regarded by many as having significantly contributed to the Patriots' victory over the royalists. Colonel Cabal, while considered brave and a good leader, was inexperienced, and this battle was the first time he had commanded troops.

In a written report of the battle, the patriot government stated the following about the American officer:

I cannot sufficiently praise to Your Excellency the courage, joy, and boldness with which the soldiers acted..as patriots, nor the resolution, fervor, and skill with which the young Alejandro Macaulay [Alexander Macaulay] commanded these actions. It had been two days since this citizen from Virginia, in the United States of America, had arrived in this city, sent by Providence to aid us. His civic virtues, great character, courage, and intelligence in defeating the enemy all contributed to making the actions we have experienced remarkably brilliant, and to the soldiers fighting with greater joy than they were accustomed to.

Shortly after the battle, the patriot government ordered Colonel Cabal and Macaulay to pursue the enemy, an expedition was quickly organized composed of around 600 men, who left the city on April 29. After the defeat at La Ladera Governor Tenorio and Commander Paz withdrew to the town of El Tambo, from there they planned to march south to Pasto in the hopes of capturing the city. In Pasto was President Caycedo with most of the Patriot army, however he had been unaware of the successful defense of Popayan, and on May 20, were caught by surprise when the royalists assaulted Pasto. Outnumbered Caycedo and his troops were forced to surrender and were held captive in the city. While Cabal and Macaulay had left Popayán with enough time to have been able to catch the royalists before they attacked Caycedo, they became delayed during their march when a lieutenant captured a royalist priest by the name of Morcillo. The government in Popayán had previously placed an order for his arrest because of his ardent support for the royalists. The secretary of government Francisco Antonio Ulloa in Popayán, then informed Cabal that the government had decided to order Morcillo's execution. Colonel Cabal disagreed with this sentence and informed the government of this, Ulloa responded to this notification angrily stating "that the government had seen this action as disgraceful, as it was an officer's duty to obey a direct order." Cabal then begrudgingly obeyed and ordered the execution of the priest. This event resulted in a ten-day delay for the expeditionary force. Although Macaulay ordered his troops to march at double pace, they only reached Meneses, an area near Pasto, on May 26. It was at Meneses that Cabal and his officers learned of the patriot defeat, the capture of President Caycedo, and the subsequent capture of his army. Upon receiving this news, Cabal and Macaulay convened a meeting with all the officers of the expeditionary force. They agreed to withdraw to Popayán, as they lacked the sufficient manpower to capture the city and rescue President Caycedo.
