= Battle of Iscuandé =

Naval engagement during the Colombian War of Independence

- Part of Colombian War of Independence
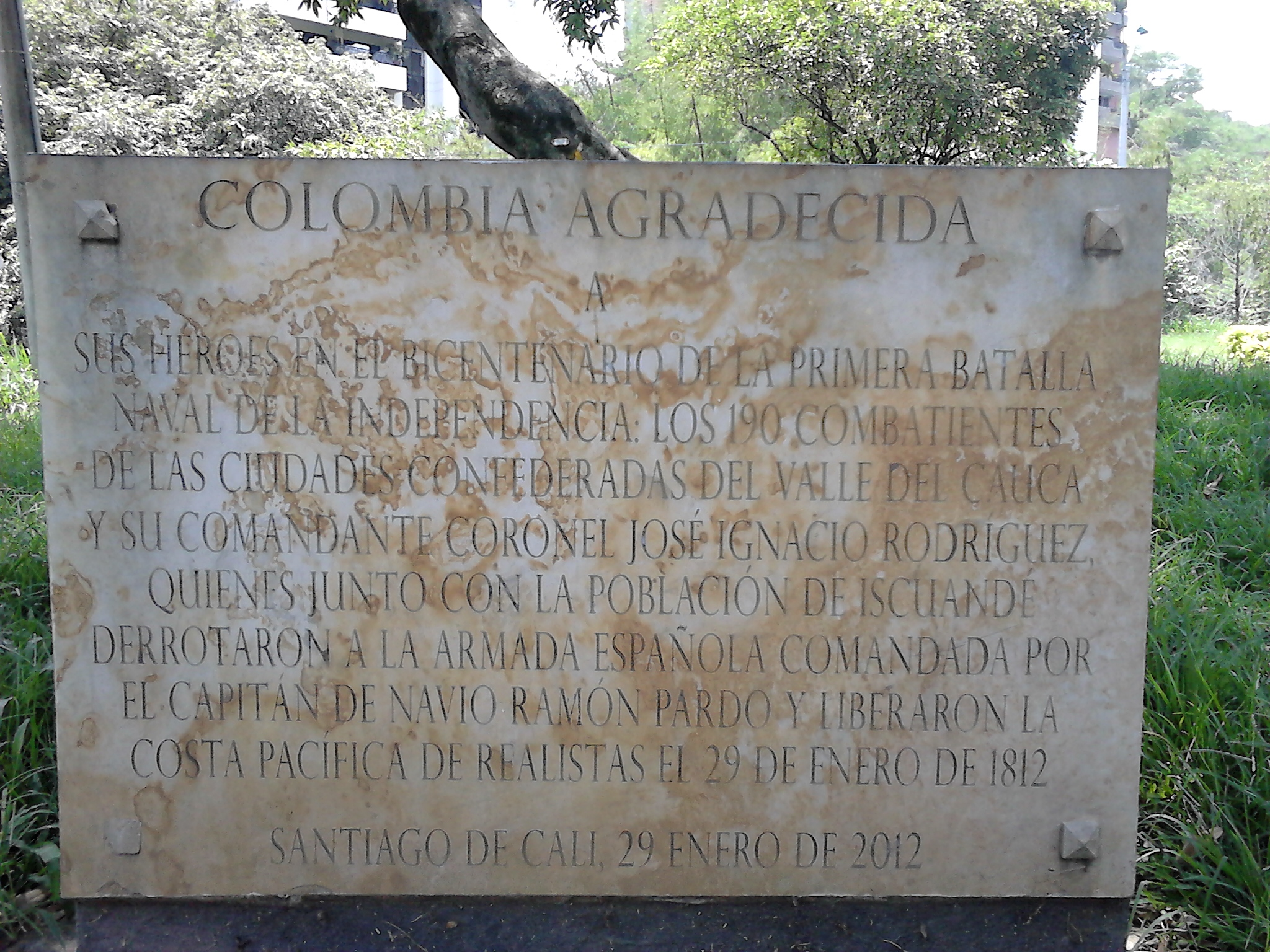
- Bicentennial Commemorative Plaque of the Battle in Santiago de Cali
Date	January 28–29, 1812
Location	Iscuandé, Popayán Province, Viceroyalty of New Granada (now Nariño Department, Colombia) 2°27′13.6″N 77°59′06.0″W
Result	Patriot Victory

Belligerents
(Valle del Cauca Department) Confederated Cities of the Cauca Valley	Kingdom of Spain

Commanders and leaders
(Valle del Cauca Department) José Ignacio Rodríguez	(Spain) Miguel Tacón y Rosique

Strength
Some small boats 190 troops (90 riflemen & 100 foot lancers)	1 brigantine 1 gunboat multiple smaller vessels 200 troops

Casualties and losses
12 killed 15 wounded	80 killed, wounded, or captured

The Battle of Iscuandé was the first naval engagement of the Colombian War of Independence, fought on January, 28 and 29, 1812, on the Iscuandé river. The battle resulted in a patriot victory that led to the liberation of the Colombian Pacific coastline from Spanish control.

== Background ==
After the patriot victory in the Battle of Bajo Palacé, the governor of the province of Popayán, Colonel Miguel Tacón, was forced to retreat to royalist Pasto. The patriots entered Popayán on April 2 and moved the junta from Cali to that city, which later led to the formal creation of the Confederated Cities of Valle del Cauca.

The patriots continued their campaign against the royalists, led by President Joaquín Caycedo y Cuero, eventually managing to take Pasto months later. Governor Tacón was forced to retreat to the Pacific coast, where he established his base of operations in the coastal city of Barbacoas. From there, he communicated with the governor of Guayaquil and the viceroy of Peru regarding his plan to defeat the patriots and reconquer the province, which consisted of raising militias in Barbacoas and Tumaco, inciting the enslaved people of the royal mines in Guapi and Timbiquí to revolt, and using the arms he expected to receive from Lima and Guayaquil to form a force capable of taking the vital port of Buenaventura, which would allow him to control the entire neogranadine coast. With control of the coastline he then planned to invade inland, and take either Pasto or Cali and then capture Popayán, with Spanish troops from Lima. The governor of Guayaquil and the Viceroy of Peru agreed and began to send limited support. Tacón allocated funds for purchasing weapons and ammunition. The governor of Guayaquil provided him with a gunboat, financed with resources that Tacón had withdrawn from Popayán before the defeat at Bajo Palacé. These resources were sent to Guayaquil and Lima, totaling 70,000 pesos in gold, both in dust and gold bars.

Militarily, Tacón organized armed groups to continuously harass the patriots. He ordered that a detachment be established between the towns Chucunez and El Guabo under the command of Lieutenant Fernando de Angulo, aiming to exert pressure on the province of Los Pastos which the patriots currently occupied. He soon learned that the patriots from Cali were beginning to build vessels in the bay of Buenaventura, thus two merchant brigantines equipped with artillery and soldiers were dispatched. These included a detachment of 30 men under the command of Lieutenant de Micay, tasked with raiding the Dagua and San Juan rivers. Additionally, a group of militiamen was deployed upstream along the Patía River to divert the republicans' attention.

Tacón also launched a land and sea expedition consisting of a small ship with two cannons and 30 riflemen, aiming to capture the city of Iscuandé. This alarmed the inhabitants of the area, who concerned about the threat posed by Tacón, sent Manuel Olaya, a miner and local resident, to seek assistance from the patriot government in Popayán.

=== Patriot Forces ===
Fearing that the royalists might seize the entire coast, the patriot government of Popayán ordered a recruitment effort to send a force to Iscuandé to prevent this. The recruitment was primarily carried out in Cali, where a force of 90 riflemen and around 100 foot lancers was gathered. This force was placed under the command of Captain José Ignacio Rodríguez, known as El Mosca. This force departed from Cali, taking the route to the port of Buenaventura. The Valle del Cauca fleet consisted only of small boats and had four old cannons, only one of which was operational. Soon after, they set sail from the port, with Captain Rodríguez and his small fleet successively arriving at the towns of Guapi and Iscuandé. According to Rodríguez, the journey was uneventful, as he stated in a letter that he found "only deep silence, occasionally interrupted by a few threatening voices left behind by Sergeant Major Rodríguez and Valverde as they retreated towards Tumaco."

=== Royalist Forces ===
Meanwhile, Colonel Tacón had moved from Barbacoas to Tumaco, where his small fleet had gathered. The Spanish fleet consisted of the brig San Antonio, also known as El Morreño, and a gunboat, La Justicia, which Tacón had received from Lima and Guayaquil. Additionally, they had two feluccas, two ceibos, and several smaller boats, forming a small but effective squadron capable of controlling the Pacific coast from Buenaventura to Guayaquil. These ships were armed with a 24-pound bronze cannon called El Invencible, an 8-pound iron cannon, two violentos, two breech-loading swivel guns, a reinforced 4-pounder, two esmeriles, and three other pieces of various calibers. Besides the naval component, the royalists also had a detachment of 200 soldiers. Their officers included Manuel Valverde, Tacón's aide; Commander Ramón Pardo; and the Pasto-born militia Captain José María Delgado y Polo.c On January 22, 1812, they fleet set sail for Iscuandé.

== Battle ==
On January 28, 1812, the Spanish squadron arrived at the mouth of the Iscuandé River, where they entered and advanced towards the Tapaje estuary, moving towards the approaching patriot forces. However, upon learning of the presence of the royalist troops, the patriots retreated to the town of Iscuandé. Colonel Tacón commanded his squadron from the gunboat Justicia, which was under the command of Lieutenant Ramón Pardo. The squadron positioned itself in front of the town and began bombarding it. In the afternoon, the patriots responded, forcing the royalists to retreat and anchor in the shelter of Sequionda.

That night, on January 28, the patriot commander conducted a reconnaissance mission at close range near the enemy ships. He fired his blunderbuss at them and returned under the cover of darkness without obtaining much information, as the night obscured his vision of the enemy.

On January 29, the royalist ships fired broadside after broadside at the patriots without causing significant damage. Captain Rodríguez returned to his troops, full of optimism, preparing for either victory or surrender, realizing that the battle was completely unequal:

"I returned, concealing from the entire troop the strength I had seen, instead telling them that I had made them retreat with my blunderbuss. Since my troops had heard the gunfire, they indeed believed it. At that moment, we embarked on our *falcas*, and I had already determined where to position the riflemen. Placing them there and setting up the artillery in front, the battle began."

Combat began at 10 a.m. Tacón’s squadron advanced until it was once again in front of the town. Its firepower was overwhelming compared to that of the patriots. Despite this, Captain Rodríguez, in his battle report to the Popayán government junta, stated:

"My soldiers, these men from Cali, who had never before seen warships, were not frightened by the novelty nor by the terrifying echo of the cannons roaring through the mountains."

The engagement lasted from 10 a.m. to 4 p.m. "on the clearest and most serene day Iscuandé had ever seen." For nearly six hours, the patriots resisted the bombardment from the royalist squadron, responding with their outdated artillery—one culverin and two or three reassembled cannons. However, their excellent marksmen inflicted significant damage on the royalists.

Come the afternoon, despite their superior firepower, the royalists became immobilized due to low tide, which prevented them from returning to the sea and left them stranded in shallow waters which complicated their angle of fire. Furthermore, internal disputes between Colonel Tacón and Lieutenant Ramón Pardo over how to conduct the operation left the royalists without clear leadership. Meanwhile, the patriots, initially suspecting that the enemy's immobility was a trick to lure them onto the ships, soon realized the royalists were genuinely stuck. They launched a boarding assault. This moment was narrated in Colonel Tacón's report on the battle:

"Noticed by the insurgents, seeing that they could approach without risk of being harmed, they placed two boats in front of the gunboat to draw its attention. Meanwhile, covered by the trees along the northern shore, they opened a vigorous rifle fire, which in the first volleys caused two deaths and several injuries."

The patriot boarding action put Colonel Tacón’s life in danger, but he was saved by Captain José María Delgado, who provided him with a canoe and stayed behind to fire the cannon and cover his commander's retreat. Unfortunately for Tacón, the canoe sank, forcing him to transfer to a smaller boat that was manned by some sailors. They fled to Tumaco while being pursued by patriot forces.

== Aftermath ==
By the end of the battle, the royalists had suffered around 80 casualties, including dead, wounded, and missing, along with a large number taken prisoner, including Lieutenant Ramón Pardo, who had been severely wounded. The patriots captured the copper-clad gunboat, which Captain Rodríguez estimated to be worth 40,000 pesos. It was armed with a 24-pound bronze cannon, El Invencible, two reinforced violentos of two pounds, the brigantine San Antonio, alias El Morreño, with its 8-pound iron cannon, two esmeriles, two small boats with breech-loading swivel guns, 80 rifles, 20 pairs of pistols, 11 quintals of gunpowder, and abundant lead and other supplies.

The patriots, for their part, suffered 12 dead and more than 15 wounded. Their great victory astonished even their own commander, who in a letter to his comrade-in-arms, Colonel José Díaz, concluded with the phrase: "There is no doubt that Our Lord Jesus Christ fully protected us here." The historian Sergio Elías Ortiz, in his book Agustín Agualongo y su tiempo, noted that the victory had been immortalized in a marimba song that he collected from the lips of a centenarian Black man, a native of Iscuandé, who sang the following verses:

Do you remember, brother, do you remember

When the great Tacón came

Saying he would take Iscuandé

With many men and cannons?

And dale, dale, nagunderé

And dale, dale, with the marimba;

And dale, dale, with saundé

And dale, dale, with the cachimba

Yes, I remember, brother Juan

That here Tacón was doomed

Because the river was fierce

And the Riviel swallowed him up.

And dale, dale, nagunderé...

It wasn’t the Riviel, brother Pedro,

That devoured Tacón,

But rather ‘La Mosca’ Rodríguez

Who destroyed him with bullets.

And dale, dale, nagunderé...

It was the Riviel, brother Juan,

That ate up Tacón

Because it had to take from him

The jewels that he stole.

The victory at Iscuandé secured patriot control of the entire Pacific coast between Tumaco and Buenaventura. Shortly after, Barbacoas surrendered and proclaimed independence. The defeat was humiliating for Colonel Tacón, who fled to Tumaco, arriving on February 2. He then traveled to Guayaquil, arriving on February 27, before ultimately reaching the port of Callao, in the Viceroyalty of Peru, on March 20, where he would continue to serve in the Spanish Army of Peru until 1819.
