= Antonio Medina y Céspedes =

Afro-Cuban poet and playwright

Antonio Medina y Céspedes (c. 1824–1885) was an Afro-Cuban poet and playwright, "among the most outstanding black intellectual figures of his time".

== Life ==
Born to free parents in Havana, Medina received an elementary school education before working as a tailor. Work at the Tacón Theatre introduced him to Havana's literary and theatrical scene, and he befriended the Afro-Cuban poets Gabriel de la Concepción Valdés and Juan Francisco Manzano. In 1842, he helped found El Faro, Havana's first newspaper for people of colour. Pursuing an education, Medina qualified as an elementary schoolteacher in 1850. He founded a school for people of colour, Nuestra Señora de los Desamparados (Our Lady of the Abandoned), and directed it until 1878. In 1856 he and Anselmo Font founded the first black Cuban literary journal, El Rocio, although only one issue was published.

== Works ==
- Poesías, 1851
- Dona Canuto de Ceibamocha o El Guajiro Generoso, 1858
- Jacobo Girondi, 1880
- Lodoiska o la maldicion, 1882
