= Year of the Lash =

Execution of leaders of a slave revolt in Cuba

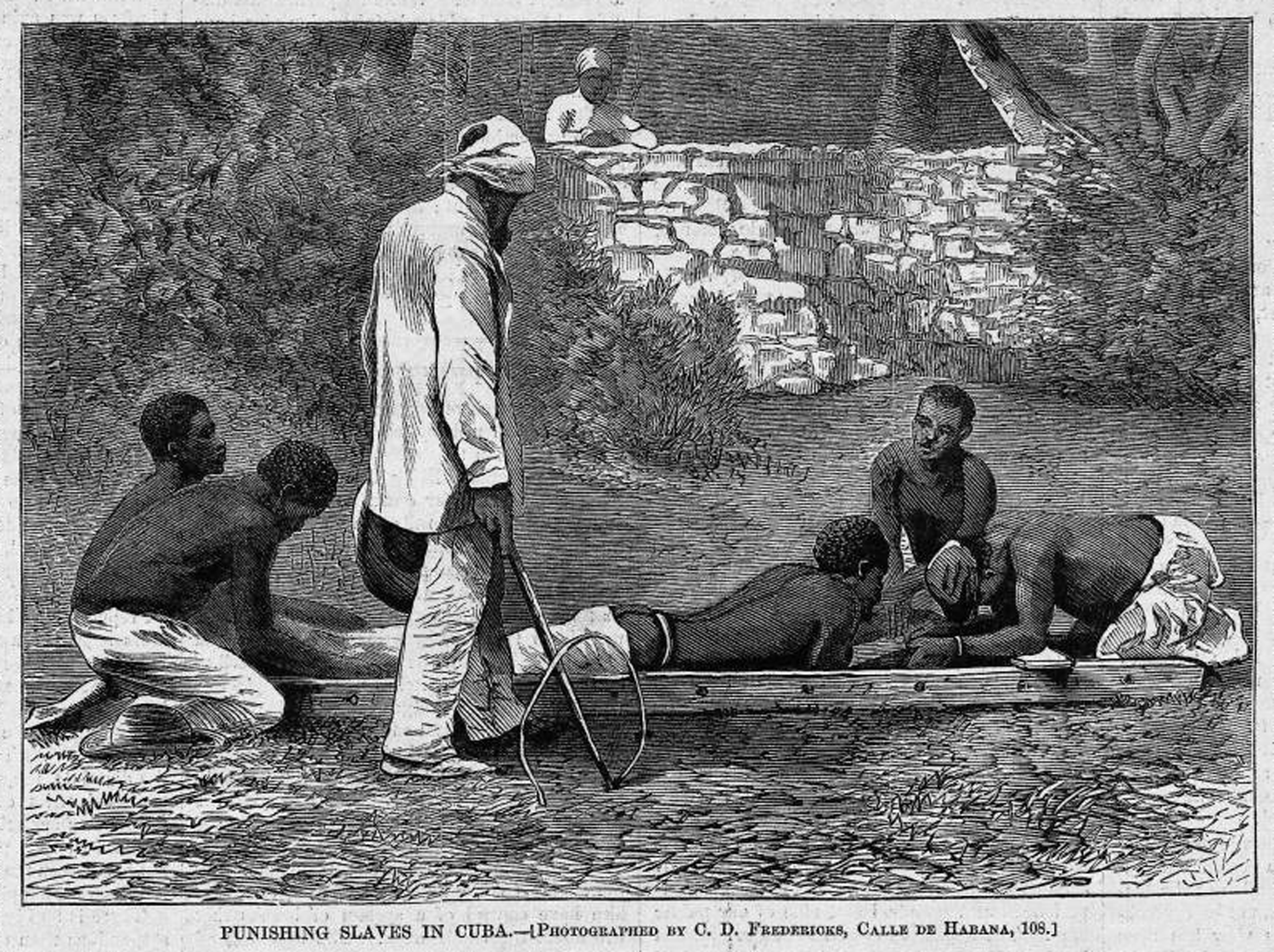
"Punishing Slaves in Cuba", an illustration of a slave being lashed tied to a ladder

Year of the Lash (in Spanish: Año del Cuero) is a term used in Cuba in reference to 29 June 1844, when a firing squad in Havana executed accused leaders of the Conspiración de La Escalera, an alleged slave revolt and movement to abolish slavery in Cuba. The term "Year of the Lash" refers generally to the harsh response toward the would-be revolt by the Cuban colonial authorities, whereby thousands of Afro-Cubans (both slave and free) were executed, imprisoned, or banished from the island. La Escalera ('the ladder') alludes to the fact that slave suspects were bound to ladders and whipped with the lash when they were interrogated.

Historians have debated over the years whether the Conspiracy of La Escalera was real or whether it was largely an invention of the Spanish authorities to justify a crackdown on abolitionists and the Afro-Cuban population, though at this point there seems to be a consensus that some kind of revolt was planned. The British consul to Cuba, David Turnbull, was convicted in absentia of being the "prime mover" of the conspiracy. Turnbull had already been expelled by Cuban authorities two years earlier.

== Historical background ==
Nineteenth-century Cuba was built upon systematized violence, similar to American slave societies. Due to this, Cuba became one of the world's largest sugar producers. The plantations of the west-central region became known for their hard labor as well as their sugar production. Slaveholders began to purchase more African women in an attempt to ensure their economic status.

In March, May, and November 1843, a series of slave revolts occurred on the island of Cuba. In December 1843, an enslaved woman named Polonia Gangá informed her owner that his property was about to be overtaken. Polina's comment is said to mark the beginning of the attempt to stop the said conspiracy. There are two more well-known African-born rebel women of the Lucumí nation, Fermina and Carlota. These two women are seen as leaders in the November uprising.

It is likely that as a Lucumí, Fermina, like Carlota, came from the region of Yorubaland, and was taken on board a slave ship. If so, she was one of the millions of people forced into slavery from that region.

Records indicate that Fermina worked in the fields on the Ácana sugar plantation and was verbal about her dislike for her working conditions on several occasions. During the summer of 1843, Fermina escaped from Ácana with a group, and there is a possibility that she and another slave organized a smaller rebellion in June. By November, Fermina made a reputation for herself as a troublemaker. After being found running away, Fermina Lucumí was whipped and placed in iron shackles for five months. A massive uprising occurred on 5 November 1843, several days after they were removed.

== The November uprising ==
Several enslaved women gave harmful testimony about Fermina regarding the events of the night of 5 November. A woman named Filomena Gangá stated that "she only remembers having seen the black woman Fermina among the rebels." Filomena reported that "Fermina joined the rebels to show them where the estate foreman and other families of the estate lived ... [Filomena] saw her leading some of them showing them the doors of the rooms where the whites usually slept. ..." Another Gangá woman reported seeing Fermina and another male rebel "clearly and distinctly", with Fermina showing fellow slaves where the white plantation residents slept. The woman, named Catalina, said she heard Fermina and another male rebel yelling to other slaves, "telling them 'The whites are escaping ...' and began to run in pursuit of the fugitives."

Camila Criolla, a field worker on the same estate, testified that Fermina "was shouting to the Triunvirato slaves[,] telling them that the whites were escaping that way; that right away [the witness] observed that Fermina was approaching the plantain grove directing several slaves and telling them 'grab that fat white man and hit him with your machete [dale de machetazos] for he is the one who puts [us in] shackles. ...'" Camila believed "the fat white man" to be the foreman or overseer on the estate. Another fieldworker named Martína said that "with great shouts, [Fermina] requested a large hammer to take off the shackles of the prisoners who were locked up on this estate."

Fermina denied the allegations against her. When questioned about what she had been doing that night, she stated that "she was sleeping in her cabin," and that when she heard the noise she ran from her cabin and "hid in a cane patch." She insisted that those who testified against her must have done so "to place themselves in a good position [buen lugar] and leave her [in a bad one]," and that they must have received some kind of reward.

Carlota Lucumí was enslaved on the Triunvirato estate where the rebellion began. Carlota is remembered for attacking the overseer's daughter at Ácana and for bragging about it to several other slaves. A field worker named Matea Gangá stated, "It is very true that a black woman from Triunvirato whom she ... heard is named Carlota, was boasting that she had attacked with a machete [habia dado con el machete] a white daughter of the overseer who is named Doña Maria de Regla." Magdalena Lucumí testified that Carlota "was talking about having attacked the child Maria de Regla, daughter of the mayoral[,] with a machete. ..."

== La Escalera and aftermath ==
Carlota was found dead the morning after the uprising. Twenty-four-year-old Fermina was interrogated and imprisoned for months. She was one of eight accused leaders to be executed by a firing squad. Her body was then burned. All the other slaves of the mill were ordered to be witnesses, along with a slave representative from each of the nearby properties.

Following the rebellions near Matanzas, government agents under the orders of the Cuban captain general, Leopoldo O'Donnell, began an investigation. During which, the government tortured suspects and arrested the "confessed" organizers. Persecution and torture spread throughout much of western Cuba in 1844. Before the investigation ended, "thousands of people of color, free and slave, had been executed, banished, or imprisoned, or had simply disappeared."

More than four thousand individuals were arrested. The most famous of those sentenced to death was the accused Gabriel de la Concepción Valdés, alias Plácido, a free mulatto, and one of Cuba's most famous poets. Free people of color made up almost half of those sentenced to death.

During interrogation, questions were designed to find the most dramatic or violent moments of the rebellion. Officials framed their questions "in terms of who killed, who set fire to buildings, who had weapons (such as machetes), who released people from shackles, who assaulted white employees/employers, who led rebels, and how the witnesses positioned themselves within such events."

Carlota is so interwoven in memory that Cuba launched its 1975 attack in support of the Angolan liberation movement under the title "Operation Carlota".

== Other mentions ==
Robert L. Paquette's Sugar Is Made with Blood, Pedro Deschamps Chapeaux's El negro en la Economía habanera del siglo XIX, and Aisha Finch's Rethinking Slave Rebellion in Cuba.

The Cuban novelist Gertrudis Gómez de Avellaneda wrote of her dad's desire to return to Spain and settle in Seville, sharing that "this plan was most definite and uppermost in his mind during the last months of his life [1823]. He complained of not being laid to rest in his native soil [Spain] and, predicting that Cuba would suffer the same fate as that of a neighboring island, seized by the blacks, begged my mother to come to Spain with their children." Cirilo Villaverde, in his famous novel of the Cuban, Cecilia Valdés, wrote a of slave conspiracy in the making. He included the use of the term "Worse than Aponte!" and hinted at La Escalera.

The novel Sab is best known for its antislavery character. The Royal Censor banned Sab in Cuba because it contained "doctrines subversive to the system of slavery in this island and contrary to morals and good habits."

== See also ==
- Timeline of Cuban history
- History of Cuba
- Spanish colonization of the Americas
