= David Turnbull (abolitionist) =

British consul and abolitionist

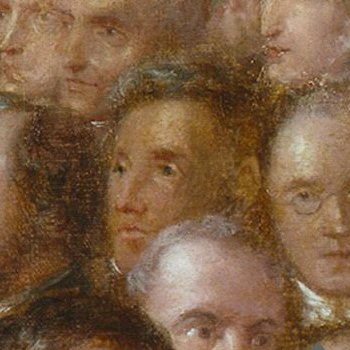
- in 1840 in the crowd at the conference
- Born: 1793; Glasgow
- Died: 7 May 1851 (aged 57–58); Paris
- Occupation: Diplomat
- Known for: Abolitionism

David Turnbull (1793–1851) was a leading 19th-century abolitionist and a British consul to Cuba. Turnbull, a Scotsman, was a key participant at the 1840 World Anti-Slavery Convention of the Anti-Slavery Society. Turnbull was blamed for creating a revolt in Cuba that resulted in 1844 being known as the Year of the Lash.

== Life ==
From 1830, Turnbull was a foreign correspondent for The Times. He spent time in Paris, in the Hague and in Brussels during 1830 and 1831. In 1832, he was sent to Madrid, where he worked with George Villiers, 4th Earl of Clarendon, the British representative to Spain, to get the Spanish government to reaffirm their commitment to ending slavery; the Spanish did this in 1835.

Turnbull wrote to Lord Palmerston, the British foreign secretary at the time, arguing that slavery was "the greatest practical evil that ever afflicted mankind."

Turnbull had spent the latter part of 1838 and early 1839 travelling in Cuba, where slavery remained legal. In 1840, he produced his best-known work, Travels in the West: Cuba; with Notices of Porto Rico and the Slave Trade. In August 1840, Lord Palmerston named Turnbull the British consul to Cuba; however, Cuba expelled him in 1842 after he was accused of attempting to incite a slave revolt. In 1844, the so-called Year of the Lash in Cuban history, there was apparently an aborted slave revolt known as the Conspiración de La Escalera. Cuban authorities convicted Turnbull in absentia of being the "prime mover" of the conspiracy, but Turnbull was never extradited. After revelations about the revolt, thousands of enslaved and free Afro-Cubans were executed, imprisoned, or banished from the island. Turnbull remained active in the abolitionist movement until his death in 1851.

== See also ==
- Abolitionism in the United Kingdom
- History of Cuba
- Year of the Lash
