= La Aurora de Matanzas =

Cuban newspaper

- Type: Periodical
- Format: Newspaper
- Founder: Diputación Patriótica de Matanzas
- Ceased publication: 1857
- Relaunched: Aurora del Yumurí (1857-1899)
- Language: Spanish
- Headquarters: Matanzas
- City: Matanzas
- Country: Cuba
- Circulation: (as of 1828)
- OCLC number: 20849161

La Aurora de Matanzas was a 19th-century newspaper published in Matanzas, Cuba, from 1828 to 1857.

== Early history ==
The publication was the official organ of the Patriotic Deputation of Matanzas (Spanish: Diputación Patriótica de Matanzas). The Matanzas Patriotic Deputation was established in 1827.

The first issue of La Aurora de Matanzas, a triweekly, was published in Matanzas on September 2, 1828.

La Aurora de Matanzas was published three times a week and featured government regulations, news, and literary works. It supported public communication in Matanzas by reflecting the era's material and spiritual progress, advancing printing techniques, updating typography, and offering diverse sections to keep readers informed. The paper addressed diverse disciplines, including science, culture, economics, literature, history, and contemporary events. Declared the "Political-Commercial Journal of Matanzas," it was the first Cuban newspaper to report on foreign wars. The paper's political section included international news, with special attention to the Russo-Turkish War between 1829 and 1830.

La Aurora was widely viewed as the island's top political and literary journal. Its growing popularity by 1830 was fueled by contributions from the young writer Domingo del Monte.

On January 28, 1831, Tiburcio Campe was appointed director of the newspaper.

José Antonio Saco, exiled from Cuba in 1834, called the April 29, 1834 issue "a paper undoubtedly more energetic than La Defensa (Nacional) itself."

By 1837, Gabriel de la Concepción Valdés, an Afro-Cuban poet known as Plácido, had a daily poem published in La Aurora de Matanzas.

The title of the publication was shortened to La Aurora on July 1, 1838. La Aurora was later merged with El Yumurí on August 1, 1857, and renamed Aurora del Yumurí. El Yumurí, established in 1842, was directed by Rafael Otero. After merging, the newspaper launched its first issue on August 1, 1857, and continued until around 1900.

The Biblioteca Gener y Del Monte, in the town of Matanzas, held a complete collection of the provincial newspaper in 1987.

The Cuban National Commission for UNESCO and the National Committee for World Memory included La Aurora del Yumurí's archives in the National Memory of the World Register on March 20, 2013.

== Directors ==
- José Pereira (1828-1831)
- Tiburcio Campe (1831-1833)
- Francisco Coronado (1857)
- Rafael Otero (1859-1861)
- José Quintín Suzarte (1864-1868)
- José de Armas Céspedes (1868)
- Francisco de P Flager (1872)
- Ernesto Lecuona (1883)
- Pedro Alejandro Boissier (1885)
- José Franco (1890)
