= José Jacinto Milanés =

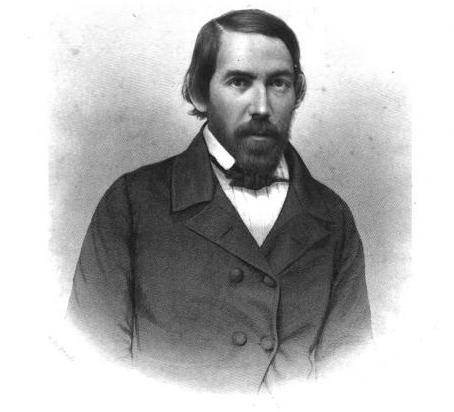
- Born: José Jacinto Milanés y Fuentes; August 16, 1814; Matanzas, Captaincy General of Cuba, Spanish Empire
- Died: November 14, 1863 (aged 49); Matanzas
- Resting place: Necropolis San Carlos Borromeo, Matanzas
- Writing career
- Notable work: El Conde Alarcos

José Jacinto Milanés y Fuentes (born August 16, 1814 Matanzas Cuba – November 14, 1863), a self-educated and from humble origins, was a poet, linguist and writer who has been acclaimed as one of the best exponents of Cuban literature with the publication of his magnum opus El Conde Alarcos (1838) (The Count Alarcos). Milanés is also considered the best playwright of Cuba. Some of his other works include El poeta en la Corte, Por el puente o por el río, and A buena hambre no hay pan duro.

== Life ==
José Jacinto Milanés was born into a poor family. His mother's name was Rita Fuentes, and his father was Álvaro Milanés, a peasant at the Real Hacienda. From an early age, during his elementary school years, José Jacinto Milanés showed an impressive talent in literature. His father, despite the poor means of living, presented him with a gift, which was a book titled El tesoro del parnaso Español (The Treasure of the Spanish Parnassus), a compilation of poems authored by the poet Manuel José Quintana. Milanés's brother said upon remembering the event that: "He received the gift with tears of happiness" From that moment forward, Milanés devoted himself to read many works of classic literature and poetry. Among the authors he read copiously were such figures as Lope de Vega and Calderón de la Barca. When he was twelve years of age, Milanés was reading in both English and French languages, and he started taking Latin language classes with Professor Guerra Betancourt. Milanés mastered the Latin language in such a way, that whenever Betancourt needed to travel outside Matanzas, he would appoint his apprentice José Jacinto Milanés to be in charge of the entire class.

Milanés started working since a young age, first as a clerk while living in Matanzas, and later as a blacksmith's helper in Havana. He stayed there in Havana until 1833, and returned later to Matanzas. Once he was back in Matanzas, he meets Domingo del Monte, known for being a Literature critic and writer, who tends a helping hand to Milanés by loaning books to him, and inviting him to participate in discussion groups where he could meet other writers. Shortly after, through the friendship with Domingo del Monte and the influence that Del Monte exerted in the city, Milanés was able to start working at a railway station as a secretary. A job position which would allow him to improve his living conditions considerably. He died 1863 and is interred in the Necropolis San Carlos Borromeo, Matanzas.

A few years later, in 1837, Milanés 's first poems were published in Havana by Ramón de Palma and José Antonio Echevarría in the Aguinaldo Habanero, a literary magazine. Milanés 's writings received an immediate and undivided attention from critics and the public nationwide. The popularity of his first poems, and the warm reception which it received, made other magazines in Matanzas like El álbum, El plantel in the year 1838, and the Yumurí, publish the poems right after.

In 1838 the autodidactic skills he was endowed with, along with the studies that later fomented his literary career, paid off tremendously. His masterpiece "El Conde Alarcos" was published that same year. In the words of his longtime friend but literary critic nonetheless, Domingo del Monte, who was quoted saying after the publication of the book, that it was "the first writing in Cuba by a Cuban… in which genius is discovered."("el primer escrito en Cuba por un Cubano… en que se descubre ingenio").
