= Ivan A. Schulman =

Critic of Latin American literature (1931–2020)

Ivan Albert Schulman
- Born: October 4, 1931
- Died: August 3, 2020 (aged 88–89); San Juan, Puerto Rico
- Education: Brooklyn College; University of California Los Angeles
- Occupations: Professor of Spanish & Comparative Literature

Ivan Albert Schulman (October 4, 1931 – August 3, 2020) was Professor Emeritus of Spanish & Comparative Literature at University of Illinois Urbana-Champaign. He was a major scholar of Spanish American Modernismo and the leading US scholar of the works of José Martí.

== Career ==
Schulman received his undergraduate degree from Brooklyn College and his PhD from the University of California at Los Angeles. At UCLA, he studied under Manuel Pedro González.

Schulman was Chair of the Department of Romance Languages and founder and Chair of the Latin American Studies Program at Washington University in St. Louis, Chair of the Department of Romance Languages at the State University of New York at Stony Brook, Graduate Research Professor and Director of the Center for Latin American Studies at the University of Florida, Professor of Spanish at Wayne State University, Head of the Department of Spanish, Italian and Portuguese and Richard G. and Carole J. Cline University Scholar at the University of Illinois Urbana-Champaign, and Jordan Davidson Visiting Distinguished Chair of Humanities at Florida International University.

He was also Visiting Professor and Research Scholar at the University of Oregon, the University of Michigan, the Universidade Federal de Rio de Janeiro, the Universidad Nacional Autónoma de México, the Universidad de Buenos Aires, and the Universidad de Granada. Additionally, Schulman served as President of the José Martí Foundation and President of the Instituto Internacional de Literatura Iberoamericana.

== Publications ==
Schulman wrote major works of literary and cultural criticism on Spanish American Modernism and the Cuban poet José Martí. These include: Coloquio sobre la novela hispanoamericana (1967) Símbolo y color en la obra de José Martí (1960), El proyecto inconcluso: la vigencia del modernismo (2002), and Painting Modernism (2014).

== Honors ==
Schulman was the recipient of a number of awards and honors for his scholarship including a Guggenheim Fellowship (1968), a National Endowment for the Humanities Grant (1983), the title of Profesor Honorario of the Universidad de la Habana (1995), and the Venezuelan Orden de Andrés Bello (1996).
