= Battle of Bajo Palacé =

First battle of the Colombian War of Independence (1811)

- Part of Colombian War of Independence
Date	March 28, 1811 (215 years ago)
Location	Palacé River, Totoró (Colombia)
Result	Patriot Victory: Patriot forces succeed in defeating the Royalist army at the Palacé River; Popayán is occupied by the Patriots on April 2.; Beginning of the Colombian War of Independence

Belligerents
(Valle del Cauca Department) Confederated Cities of the Cauca Valley. Supreme Junta of Santafé	Kingdom of Spain

Commanders and leaders
Antonio Baraya (Valle del Cauca Department) Joaquín de Cayzedo	(Spain) Miguel Tacón y Rosique

Strength
Encina: 1.100; Aragón: 450 infantry, 350 cavalry y 300 foot lancers, and 16 artillerymen brought from Santa Fe; Carvajal: 1,300 troops, 4 light cannons y 2 falconets Restrepo: 1,200 (1.100 caucanos)	Encina: 1,500; Camacho: 1,600; Restrepo: 1,500

Casualties and losses
9-12 killed 21-52 wounded	70-100 killed 38 captured

The Battle of Bajo Palacé was the first major military campaign of the Colombian War of Independence, resulting in a Patriot victory over the Spanish royalist army. The battle was fought on March 28, 1811, on the banks Palacé River where the Palacé bridge crossed the river, located a few kilometers north of the city of Popayan, this bridge was part of the route of the Camino Real that connected the city of Popayan with Cali.

== Background ==
In the Viceroyalty of New Granada a revolt occurred in the viceregal capital of Santafé de Bogotá, this would be known as the Revolt of July 20, 1810, also known as the "Cry of Independence", it would see the removal of the viceroy of New Granada Antonio José Amar y Borbón and the royal government in the capital and lead to the creation of the Supreme Governing Junta of Santafé. The news of these events profoundly affected the Spanish governor of the southern province of Popayán, Colonel Miguel Tacón y Rosique.

On August 11, 1810, Tacón learned that the Supreme Governing Junta had sent out letters addressed to the various councils of the cities in his province, informing them of the events that had taken place in the capital and suggesting that they establish their own juntas. Governor Tacón took the initiative to convene an open council in Popayán, with the attendance of representatives from all the towns in the province, to determine the most appropriate course of action. Meanwhile, to maintain order, a provisional security junta was established. Governor Tacón, being a skilled politician, encouraged loyalty to the crown in Pasto, upheld obedience to the Council of Regency, and dissolved the Security Junta by taking advantage of the divisions among the patriots.

Several cities in the northern part of the province, specifically the Cauca Valley (Spanish: Valle del Cauca), inspired by Dr. Joaquín Caicedo y Cuero, convened and established a Governing Junta in Cali, with Caicedo himself elected as president. Upon learning of this, Tacón demanded the dissolution of the Junta and threatened to use force if the order was not carried out. These threats coupled with news that reached Cali about the military preparations being made by the governor to dissolve the Governing Junta forced the patriots of the Valle del Cauca to begin the steps to organize their own army. One of the first steps in organizing this force was taken when the patriots seized 200 rifles that were being transported from Panama to Popayán at the port of Buenaventura, as well as gathering all the other weapons that were available in the Valley.

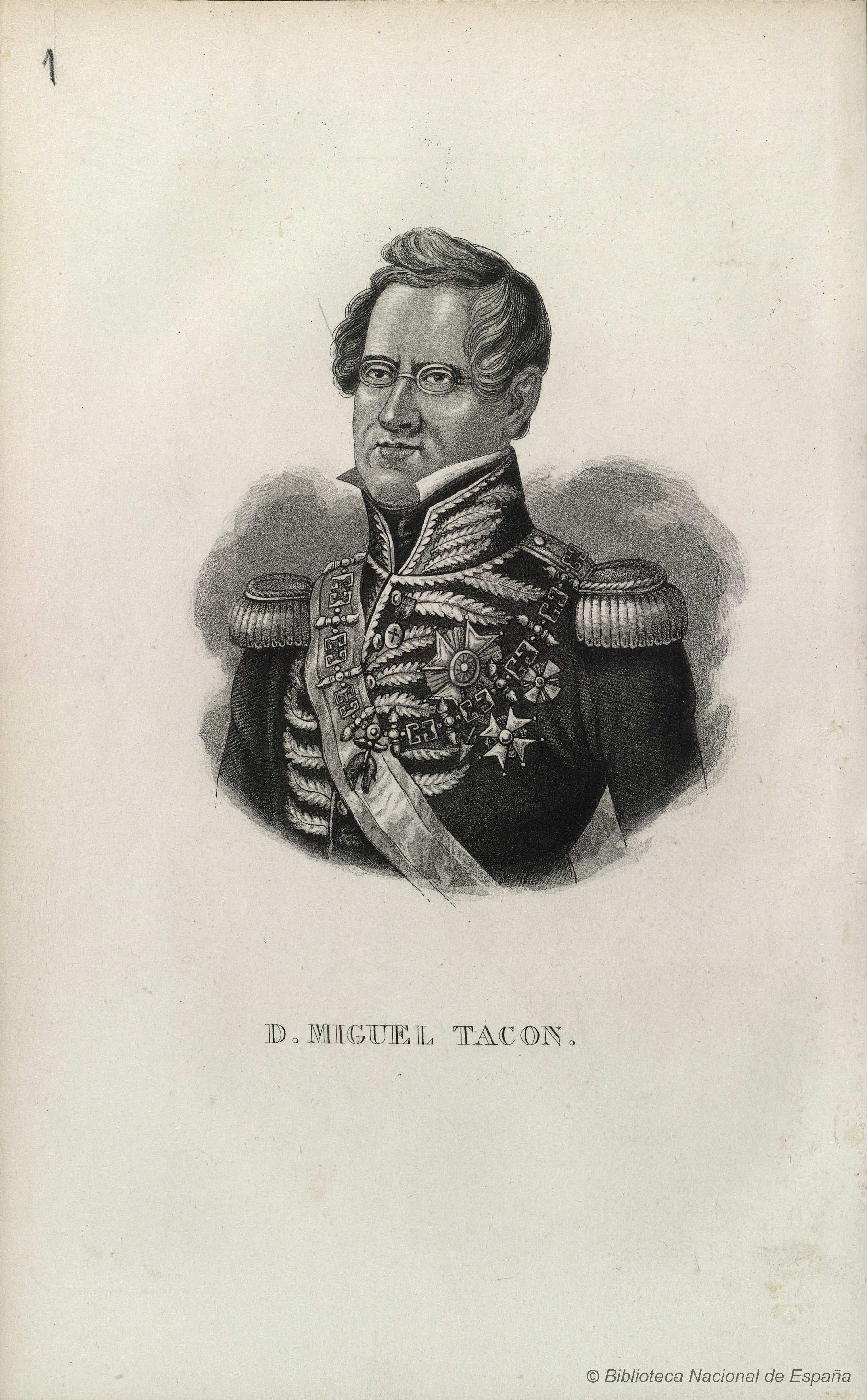
Colonel Miguel Tacón y Rosique, Governor of the Province of Popayan and commander of the royalist forces

Despite these efforts, the junta considered that these resources were insufficient and requested assistance from the Supreme Governing Junta of Santa Fe. This request was granted, and without delay, the junta appointed Colonel Antonio Baraya, a member of the Junta and commander of the infantry battalion Guardias Nacionales, to lead the column of troops sent to support the forces of the Valle, with the rank of colonel. On November 15, 1810, Colonel Antonio Baraya departed from Santafé and began his march to Cali with 150 infantry troops and 16 artillerymen, all equipped with their corresponding supplies. Baraya decided to take the Quindío road to reach the south. On November 24, the army arrived in Ibagué, where they rested briefly before resuming their march on December 5. They reached Cartago on December 13, continued on December 20, and arrived in Cali on December 26. During the march, they received logistical and food support from the patriots in the various towns they passed through.

Along with troops received from Santafe, the patriots in the Valley also received support from the Neiva Province in the east, where priest Andrés Ordóñez, a patriot sympathizer, began to organize guerrilla forces composed of the indigenous peoples of that province, they were armed with only a few rifles and were primarily wielded lances, they also constructed fake cannons made out of Guadua wood which were painted to look like real ones. This province which lay east of Popayan was connected to Popayan through the Guanacas Pass. Thus in support of the Patriots in the Cauca Valley the governor of the Neiva province, named Colonel José Díaz as commander of these improvised forces and tasked him with training these guerrillas so that they would also attack Governor Tacón in Popayán, in coordination with the patriot troops from the Valley.

=== Royalist preparations ===
With these developments, Governor Tacón was now threatened from the north and the west. Tacón had been quite pessimistic about the situation even before the arrival of the troops from Santafé. The 30 troops he had positioned in the town of Inzá to cover his western flank were forced to withdraw by patriot guerrillas, who captured 16 of them as well as 10 rifles and other supplies. From that moment on, Tacón began to take drastic measures. He imprisoned suspected patriot sympathizers in Popayán and, in an effort to bolster his forces, decreed that slaves would be granted their freedom if they volunteered to fight in the royalist army. This decision caused significant tension between him and the economic and social elite of the province. Before the start of the campaign, he ensured that the funds from the city's treasury and the royal mint were transported to the city of Pasto as a precaution in case Popayán fell into patriot hands.

=== Patriot preparations ===
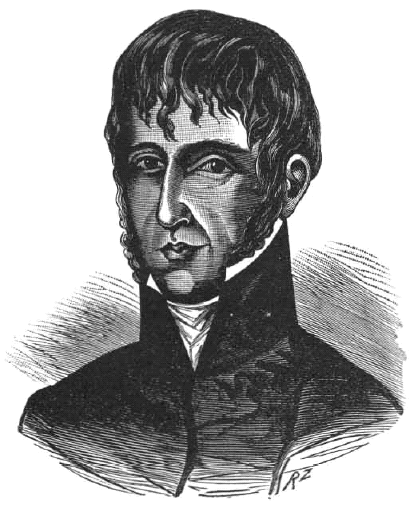
Colonel Antonio Baraya, commander of the Patriot Army.

Upon arriving to Cali, for the next three months Colonel Baraya dedicated his time to preparing his troops for the upcoming campaign, the officers and troops who had been brought from Santafe were also tasked with instructing and training the troops the Cali Junta had recruited for the army. Baraya also ordered the creation of a cavalry unit as he lacked one and requested horses from local councils of Cali, Buga, and Caloto to form this unit. Given that the Cali Junta had few funds at its disposal the patriot army received generous donations from throughout the valley in order to sustain their operations.

There was relatively little movement for the next three months as Colonel Baraya had received instructions from the Junta in Santafé to exhaust all possible means to reach a settlement with Tacón before launching a campaign, although he took several measures to attempt this, they all ended without any favorable results.

With all means exhausted for a settlement Baraya began to devise his strategy, his first plan was to impose a blockade on Popayán from the north. To accomplish this, he deployed troops to San Miguel and Quilichao, key locations along the routes from the Valle to Popayán. However, this cautious measure had to be immediately revised, as it was impossible to force the surrender of a city by blocking supply routes from only one direction while leaving the communication lines with royalist Pasto untouched. Additionally, this blockade harmed trade in the cities of the Valle.

=== Beginning of patriot operations ===
Abandoning this initial plan, Baraya decided to go on the offensive, his strategy was now to launch an attack on Popayán. To do this, he concentrated his forces at a site known as Corrales, the combined Valle del Cauca and Santafé patriot army consisted of 450 infantry soldiers, 350 cavalrymen, and 300 foot lancers. From Corrales, on March 25, Baraya sent a 200-man detachment under the command of Captain Ignacio Torres, with orders to advance to Piendamó. This force included officers Miguel and Francisco Cabal, who were brothers. This detachment continued its march along remote paths, taking all necessary security measures in response to reports that the enemy had a strong vanguard stationed near the river. The current was high, making it necessary to construct a bridge to cross. This task was completed by 3:00 PM on March 25.

The patriot forces then took positions on the heights of the left bank, from where they observed the enemy's withdrawal. The patriot vanguard proceeded to reconnoiter the area and the surrounding positions as a security measure to ensure they could remain there on March 25 and 26.

Meanwhile, the main army was marching in the same direction, led by a vanguard under the command of Lieutenant Atanasio Girardot, consisting of 75 infantrymen, 35 cavalrymen, and 80 foot lancers. The patriot column arrived at the Piendamó River, crossing it with some difficulty using the bridge that had been constructed for the purpose. As a result, the troops arrived at Alto de Piendamó in small groups.

Determined to continue his march toward the city and convinced that his enemy would not leave their entrenchments on its outskirts, Baraya deployed a vanguard consisting of 100 infantrymen and the artillery to the heights near the Cofre River. On March 27 at 6:00 AM, he sent a 30-man reconnaissance patrol under the command of Captain Ignacio Torres and officers Miguel Cabal and José María Materón to establish contact with the patriot forces from Neiva, whose government had agreed to incorporate them into the army of Valle del Cauca.

However, realizing that the vanguard force was too small, Baraya sent reinforcements on March 28, consisting of 25 cavalrymen and an infantry company. Meanwhile, the main army remained at the Piendamó camp, awaiting the reinforcements from Neiva.

== Battle ==
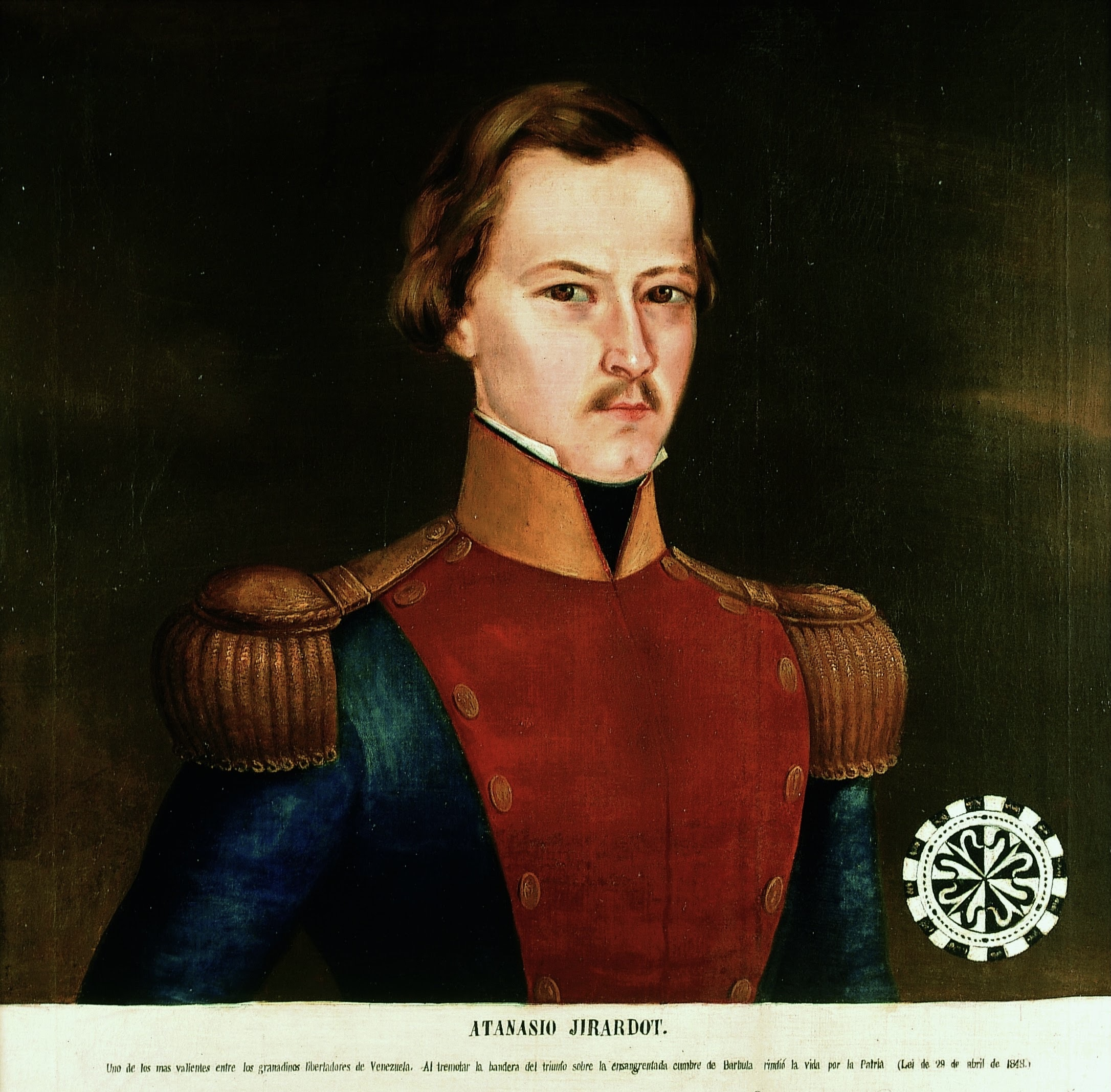
Lt. Atanasio Girardot (depicted in this painting as a colonel) who commanded the patriot vanguard

Meanwhile, Governor Tacón, frustrated by the inaction of the patriot commander, who had remained inactive for nearly three months without launching a campaign, decided to leave his entrenchments on the outskirts of Popayán with 550 men and march decisively north to face his enemy. On the morning of March 28, at seven o’clock, they encountered the patriot vanguard, whose commander, Lieutenant Atanasio Girardot, had imprudently advanced from the Cofre River, the location designated by Colonel Baraya as the assembly point. Faced with an inferior position but taking advantage of the river’s course, the young officer took defensive positions and informed his commander, who was in Piendamó, two hours away, about the unexpected development.

Upon receiving Girardot’s report, Colonel Baraya immediately ordered a company of riflemen and a company of lancers, under Captain Manuel Larrahondo’s command, to march at full speed to assist Girardot and his troops. He also instructed the rest of the army to prepare to march toward the Palacé River while he personally headed to the battlefield to assess the situation and take the necessary measures.

Meanwhile, the Spanish troops continued their descent from the small hills on the left bank of the Palacé, aiming to seize the bridge and defeat Girardot’s small force. To achieve this, the royalist artillery, consisting of two light cannons, opened fire at 12:30 PM to support the advance of their infantry. However, the courage of Lieutenant Girardot and his troops managed to hold back the royalist advance, preventing the surprise attack from having disastrous consequences for the independence cause. Despite being outnumbered, Girardot’s troops resisted the overwhelming royalist charge. This first engagement lasted approximately an hour and a half.

Thanks to this heroic resistance, Colonel Baraya was able to reach the battlefield shortly afterward. He arrived with three officers and immediately began assessing the situation. His presence proving to be crucial and decisive.

By 4:00 PM, the royalist infantry, supported by artillery fire, crossed the bridge and forced the patriots out of the house where they had entrenched themselves. In response, Colonel Baraya ordered Ensign José María Cancino to position the patriot artillery—four small cannons—engaging in an artillery duel with the royalist forces. During the battle, the royalist infantry managed to capture one of the cannons, but despite this setback, the patriot lines held firm.

The bulk of the patriot army arrived successively, reinforcing the independent forces. The battle reached a stalemate, and only the malfunction of one of the patriot cannons, due to a broken breech, weakened their artillery fire.

However by 5:30 PM, the situation looked difficult for the patriots. Their cavalry had not yet arrived due to a delay in preparation, as the horses had scattered across the camp in Alto Piendamó, making it difficult to regroup them. However, at 6:00 PM, the patriot cavalry, commanded by Captains Miguel Cabal and Ignacio Torres, arrived on the battlefield. They launched a fierce charge against the enemy lines, breaking them and forcing the royalists to retreat across the bridge. The cavalry pursued them, launching a devastating assault on the royalist artillery, which fell into patriot hands. With this powerful momentum, the patriot infantry, emboldened by the cavalry’s success, launched a bayonet charge, shattering the formations of the king’s troops. The royalist forces, in disarray and protected by a few units that continued to fire until nightfall, retreated southward. The victorious patriot army remained at the battlefield overnight.

Meanwhile, Governor Tacón fled with his troops to San Juan de Pasto, which would become the main royalist stronghold in what is now Colombian territory.

== Aftermath ==
With the battle concluded, the patriot army remained on the battlefield. Despite the victory, Colonel Baraya never fully grasped the magnitude of his triumph. He likely assumed that the enemy had merely retreated to a stronger position near Popayán. For this reason, he remained at the battlefield overnight and did not chase after Tacon.

At dawn on March 29, he received a communication from the cabildo of Popayán proposing a cessation of hostilities, as they had assumed control of the government following Governor Tacón’s flight to Pasto. Additionally, some local citizens informed him of this development, reporting that the cabildo of Pasto had also fled and that the city was in a state of panic. Upon receiving this news, Baraya immediately marched toward Popayán, camping on the outskirts of the city. He did not formally enter until April 1, when he made his triumphant entrance.

In his report on the battle, Colonel Baraya left the following statement:

"All officers and soldiers fulfilled their duty to my satisfaction in this glorious and forever memorable action. However, I especially commend Lieutenant Atanasio Girardot, Artillery Ensign José María Cancino, and Sergeant Major Márquez, who distinguished themselves in the battle."

The royalist forces suffered approximately 100 deaths, including Ensign Alonso Almanza and an artillery officer of the same rank, Moledo. They also recorded 38 prisoners, numerous wounded, and the loss of one culverin, two small cannons, and the carriages of two others. On the patriot side, there were 9 casualties, including Captain Miguel Cabal and Ensign Manuel María Larrahondo. They also suffered 21 wounded, among them Colonel Baraya himself, who was injured in his left arm.

The news of the republican victory was received with great jubilation in Santafé, where it arrived on April 7. To commemorate the triumph, the cabildo of Popayán ordered the minting of a commemorative medal and sent expressions of gratitude to the government of Santafé. In recognition of the victory, the Supreme Junta promoted Colonel Baraya to the rank of brigadier and awarded the officers a badge of honor, worn on the left arm, in yellow and red with the inscription "Vencedores en Palacé" (Victors at Palacé). Additionally, the junta promoted Captain José de Ayala to lieutenant colonel, Lieutenant Atanasio Girardot to captain, and Ensign José María Cancino to lieutenant for their exceptional performance during the battle.

The following year, on January 28, Tacón was defeated in the Battle of Iscuandé when patriot forces launched a naval assault on his vessel in the Iscuandé River. Despite the defeat, Tacón managed to escape to the Viceroyalty of Peru, where he would remain never to return to New Granada again.
