= Juan Francisco Manzano =

Cuban writer and slave (1797-1853)

- Born: 1797; Matanzas, Cuba, Spain
- Died: July 19, 1853 (aged 55–56); Havana, Cuba, Spain
- Occupations: Writer; poet; playwright; craftsman; page

Juan Francisco Manzano (c. 1797–1853) was born a house slave in the province of Matanzas, Cuba during the colonial period. Manzano's father died before he was fifteen and his only remaining family was his mother, sister, and two brothers. Manzano worked as a page throughout his life. He wrote two works of poetry and his autobiography while still enslaved. The Autobiography of a Slave is one of only two personal accounts of 19th-century Cuban slavery, the only existing narrative accounts of slavery in Spanish America. The other is by Esteban Mesa Montejo. A modern translation (2025) exists, translated by Mauricio Di Paolantonio titled: Autobiography of a Slave: The Memoir of Juan Francisco Manzano.

An earlier translation exists by Irish abolitionist Richard Robert Madden who published his English translation of the autobiography under the title Life of the Negro Poet in his 1840 book Poems by a slave in the island of Cuba. A second part to Manzano's autobiography was lost. He obtained his freedom in 1836 and later wrote a book of poems and a play, Zafira. In 1844, Manzano was falsely accused of being involved in the conspiracy of La Escalera. After his release from prison in 1845 he did not publish again and died in 1853.

== Early life ==
Manzano was born to María Pilar Infazón and Toribio Manzano in 1797 or 1798. His married parents were both enslaved under Señora Beatriz de Jústiz de Santa Ana, his mother being her chief handmaid. He had two younger brothers, one named Florencio, and a freed sister named María del Rosario.

From birth, Manzano has treated exceptionally well by Señora Beatriz. In his Autobiografía, Manzano states that she called him "el niño de mi vejez," translating literally to the child of my old age. He states, too, that he called her mamá mía, literally translating to my mother. At six years old, he was sent to school with his godmother, Trinidad de Zayas. At the age of ten, Manzano was able to recite entire sermons from memory, for which he was paid.

According to Manzano, he began to work as a page around this time. After the death of Señora Beatriz, Manzano was sent to Havana where he spent five years living with his godparents and learning how to sew. In 1809, Manzano was taken to meet María de la Concepción Valdés, Marqueza de Prado-Ameno. At the age of twelve, he became her page and suffered many abuses under her.

== Hardships ==
While enslaved in the house of Marqueza de Prado-Ameno, Manzano faced many forms of physical and mental torture.

As a child, Manzano was forced to stay awake until after Prado-Ameno finished socializing over games, usually after midnight. He was then to hold a lamp-well hanging from the back of a carriage. If the lamp went out he would receive physical punishment. He was expected to carry out his usual daily tasks, including waking up before the house to clean, while deprived of sleep. When he failed to complete his daily tasks due to sleep deprivation, Manzano was locked in a dungeon without food or water. Other house slaves were given orders to not provide him with either. His mother and brother Florencio often risked their own lives to provide him food, water, and protection.

A common punishment for Manzano was to be sent to the men's infirmary, which was used as a morgue. In the infirmary, Manzano suffered a physical punishment so severe that he fainted from blood loss. Manzano was also beaten severely for nine days after being accused of stealing a chicken. During the nine days, he was expected to complete his daily tasks as a page when he was not being tortured.

== Learning to write ==
Manzano learned to write by copying discarded papers written on by his master, Don Nicolás. According to Manzano, Don Nicolás told him to stop trying to write and find something to sew. Before he taught himself how to write, Manzano composed short poems called Décimas. He claims he kept them in a notebook in the vault of his memory, and when he needed to remember them, he would improvise.

In 1830, he became a part of a group of Cuban reformists who, led by liberal writer Domingo Del Monte, encouraged Manzano to write. While still enslaved, he published Poesias liricas (1821) and Flores pasageras (1830). In 1835, he began writing Autobiografía at the request of Domingo del Monte, who started a collection to buy Manzano's freedom. Del Monte wanted him to write a narrative of his life to help promote abolition among the enlightened middle class. In correspondence between Manzano and Del Monte, Manzano was initially hesitant to reveal details of his life. He held back some material that he wanted to put in a later book, which never appeared. Manzano was able to buy his freedom through the collection in 1836. Del Monte would become the president of Comisión de Literatura in Cuba's Sociedad Económica de los Amigos del País in 1942.

== Published works ==
=== Autobiography ===
His work appears to be the first slave narrative published in Spanish America. Manzano says in his narrative that his parents' mistress possessed the power over life and death - and allowed him to be born. He writes, "remember when you read me that I am a slave and that the slave is a dead being in the eyes of his master," He had this master until he was 12 years old and she died. He remembers little of her death except standing in a line in his mistresses bed and crying afterward.

Manzano's biography makes reference to his body as a tool for his mistress's pleasure. His second mistress, Marquesa de Prado Ameno, exercised control by dressing him up. When dressed in fine clothes, he was on his mistress's good side. When dressed in rags, this symbolized her displeasure. His change of dress publicized symbolically him being stripped of his identity in front of others. Manzano's dignity was removed, due to his constant change of costume. He also claims that when he turned 14 his punishments grew worse and worse. His mistress would cage him up for 24 hours at a time without food or water. He would be punished several times a week: "Este penitencia era tan frequente que no pasaba una semana en que no sufriese de este género de castigo dos o tres veces." (This punishment was so common that not a week passed where I would not suffer from beatings twice or three times per week.)

==== Spanish edition ====
Spanish colonial regime suppressed the history of marginalized social groups such as the African and the Chinese during the period the autobiography was written. During that time the Cuban sugar economy depended on slave labor for its economy. Even after the end of the Spanish rule in 1898, the book was unavailable to be published in Cuba or the Spanish colonies. The autobiography was the property of Del Monte, passed to Del Monte's heirs and then passed to the national library in Havana where it was published in 1937.

==== English edition ====
In the 19th century, Abolitionists published the literary works of slaves. In Manzano's case, his autobiography was published with the help of Del Monte and Madden. Because a Spanish version could not be published for some time, an English version translated by Richard Madden was published in England. In North America, slave narratives were translated and edited, partly for dramatic effect and would sometimes omit details. In Manzano's case, names, places and dates as well as instances of brutality were removed. Molloy points out that "on occasion the narratives contain so many of the editors views that there is little room for the testimony of the fugitive".

=== Zafira ===
Manzano's play, Zafira, was published in 1842. It was a metaphor of colonialism and slavery in Cuba. Zafira takes place in 16th century Mauritania in North Africa. The play follows Zafira, an Arabian princess, who mourns the loss of her husband and dreads the wedding with the Turkish pirate, Barbarroja, who wants to rule the coast. Her son, Selim, returns in disguise to reclaim the throne. He allies himself with the slave Noemi to challenge the reign of Barbarroja. Zafira references the Haitian Revolution of 1791, and the republic established there in 1804. The revolt led wealthy landowners to flee to Cuba bringing stories of the rebellion. French slaves were not allowed in Cuba for fear of another revolt. There was a presence of Spanish soldiers to prevent another uprising.

In the play, Selim possesses a mysterious letter. Zafira presents the letter to Barbarroja who responds to the letter with fear. This represents the Spanish and Cuban's fear of another uprising like the Haitian Revolution. The themes are tyranny, exile, subjugation, slavery and rebellion in 19th-century Havana which indirectly challenged Spanish colonial rule. Manzano makes a subtle critique on personal and national sovereignty. His drama reflects the intellectual and political values of the enlightenment such as reason, order, justice and equality. Manzano may have found inspiration for Zafira from an earlier Spanish version entitled Tragedia. The Spanish hero in the original version was taken out in favor of the slave Noemi who represents Afro-Cuban slaves. In resistance writing, meaning is hidden in a symbol that appears harmless although it is full of complex double meanings. Manzano's play was about reaffirming African identity through the ideas of liberty and self-determination.

== Contemporary views of his work ==
Literary critic Jose Antonio Portoundo's article "Toward a new history of Cuba", written shortly after the triumph of the Cuban revolution, says: "there is no history among us that did not study the rise and fall of the dominant hegemonic class: the island bourgeoisie." He recommends to include the exploited class and their struggles into Cuban history. Manzano's autobiography gave rise to testimonial literature which discovered and uncovered the "History of a people without a history."
