= Cecilia Valdés =

Novel by Cirilo Villaverde

Cecilia Valdés is both a novel by the Cuban writer Cirilo Villaverde (1812–1894), and a zarzuela based on the novel. It is a work of importance for its quality, and its revelation of the interaction of classes and races in Havana, Cuba.

== Novel ==
The first version of the novel Cecilia Valdés o la Loma del Angel was published in Havana in 1839. After several revisions, the definitive and extended version was published in New York City in 1882. It has never been out of print in Spanish and has been translated into several English editions (as Cecilia Valdes" or "Angel Hill). It is widely regarded as the best Cuban novel of the 19th century.

=== Synopsis ===
The story takes place in colonial Cuba around 1830. The young and beautiful light skinned mulatta, Cecilia Valdés, is the illegitimate daughter of powerful land magnate and slave trader, Cándido de Gamboa. Leonardo de Gamboa is his legitimate son. Leonardo falls in love with Cecilia, not realizing that she is his half-sister, and they become lovers. At the same time, a poor black musician, José Dolores Pimienta, is also hopelessly in love with Cecilia. Cecilia rejects Pimenta's advances and conceives Leonardo's son.

However, love between Leonardo and Cecilia does not last. He abandons her and becomes betrothed to a white upper class woman, Isabel Ilincheta. Cecilia turns to the faithful Pimienta to plan revenge. On the day of his wedding, Leonardo is assassinated on the steps of the cathedral by Pimienta who acts on the instigation of Cecilia. Pimienta is executed, and she is thrown in prison.

Cecilia Valdés reveals the intricate problems of race relations in Cuba. There are the elite social circles of Spanish-born and creole whites; the growing number of mulattos, of which Cecilia is one, and the blacks: some slaves, some freed men. The blacks are also divided between those who were born in Africa and those born in Cuba, those who worked on the sugar plantation and those who worked in the households of the wealthy in Havana. Cecilia Valdés is a canvas displaying the sexual, social, and racial interaction of the Cubans of the day.

== Zarzuela ==
The zarzuela is in two acts with music by Gonzalo Roig. The libretto was by Agustin Rodríguez and José Sánchez-Arcilla, based on the novel Cecilia Valdés, o la Loma del Angel by Cirilo Villaverde. The storyline is about a tragedy of manners, love and revenge, in colonial Cuban society of the early 19th century.

=== Performance history ===
- World premiere: Havana, Cuba 1932
- Metropolitan Opera premiere: July 17, 1965
- Toronto Operetta Theatre: February 15, 2003.
- Teatro de la Zarzuela: January 24, 2020.

=== Critique ===
In Villaverde's novel (completed in 1882), the melodramatic plot serves as a background for social life in Cuba, with slavery, injustice, crises and personal tragedies, following colorful presentation in detailed characterization and description, even to the point that the plot itself loses its pace at times, long before reaching its climax, as if the author had lost interest in his story and wanted to finish it as fast as possible.

In Roig's zarzuela, however, dramatic element is more exposed, more consistent and in swift action, presented as an interesting unrolling story pointing toward inevitable climax, which shows great talent and theatrical experience on the part of the composer, the piece containing mixture of traditional Cuban music, with all its genres, forms and vivid rhythms and dances, interlaced in good balance with predominantly romantic in style music of the Western tradition, particularly in melody and orchestration.

"The zarzuela Cecilia Valdes can be more pleasing to listen to than Verdi, and at times more profound than Meyerbeer or Bellini."

=== Available recordings ===
- Audio CD from Orfeon Records (1997)

== Film ==
A film based on the novel was produced in Cuba in 1982. The film stars Daisy Granados as Cecilia Valdés and Imanol Arias as Leonardo de Gamboa.

== Literary references ==
- Cuban writer Reinaldo Arenas wrote his own version of Villaverde's novel in his book Graveyard of the Angels (La loma del ángel).
- Cuban writer Daína Chaviano also offered a different and personal version of Villaverde's story in her novel The Island of Eternal Love (Riverhead, 2008), where both protagonists and even the author himself appear as characters.
