= Cirilo Villaverde =

Cuban writer (1812-1894)

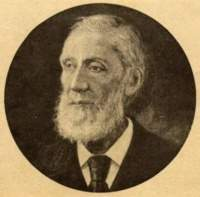
- Born: 28 October 1812 near Pinar del Río, Colonial Cuba
- Died: 24 October 1894 (aged 81); New York City, United States

Cirilo Villaverde de la Paz (28 October 1812 – 24 October 1894) was a Cuban poet, novelist, journalist and freedom fighter. He is best known for Cecilia Valdés, a novel about classes and races in colonial Cuba.

When the poet Miguel Teurbe Tolón's wife, sewed the first flag of Cuba, Villaverde helped settle upon the final design: two white stripes, three blue, a red triangle, and a lone star.

== Biography ==
He was born to a doctor on a sugar plantation called San Diego de Nuñez. His family lived by a sugarcane mill, so he was able to observe slavery and all of its evils from a very young age. In 1820, the family moved to Havana, where he later studied law. He was, however, only briefly employed by a law firm before becoming a teacher and devoting himself to literature.

His first works were published in a magazine with the lengthy name Miscelánea, de útil y agradable recreo (Miscellaneous Useful and Agreeable Recreations). He also attended the literary gatherings of Domingo del Monte, an advocate of public education. During this time, he made contributions to a number of now largely forgotten periodicals.

Beginning in 1840, he became an advocate of Cuban independence from Spain and worked as a secretary to General Narciso López, who later undertook two futile invasion attempts to liberate Cuba. In 1848, before that occurred, Villaverde was arrested by Spanish soldiers in his own home but, the following year, successfully arranged his escape and fled to the United States and settled in New York, where he was politically active; working as the editor and publisher of some Cuban exile magazines, including La Verdad and El Independiente.

Under cover of a general amnesty, he returned to Cuba in 1858; editing and making contributions to several periodicals. He was apparently disheartened by the state of things there and returned to New York in 1860, where he worked as an editor for Frank Leslie's Illustrated Newspaper. In 1864, he and his wife opened a private school in Weehawken. Four years later, following the outbreak of what would become known as the Ten Years' War, he joined the revolutionary junta in exile.

He spent the remainder of his life working for various publications, writing novels, translating and advocating for Cuban independence. In 1888 and 1894, just before his death, he made brief visits to Cuba. His remains were returned there and placed in an unmarked grave.

In 2008, Cuban writer Daína Chaviano paid tribute to Villaverde in her novel The Island of Eternal Love (Riverhead Press), where he appears as one of the characters. Chaviano also offers a very different version of Cecilia Valdés, re-writing the original story in one of the sub-plots.

== Works ==
- "The Girl with the Golden Arrow" (La joven de la flecha del oro)
- "The Farmer" (El Guajiro)
- "The Cuban Revolution Seen From New York" ("La revolucion de Cuba vista desde New York")
- "Cecilia Valdés or the Hill of the Angel" (Cecilia Valdés o La Loma del Angel) This was the major work of his life, and generally regarded as the most significant Cuban novels of the 19th century. Available in its entirety at Project Gutenberg

== Sources ==
- Cirilo Villaverde Criticism
- Cirilo Villaverde in Encyclopædia Britannica
