= Miguel Tacón y Rosique =

Spanish soldier and colonial administrator

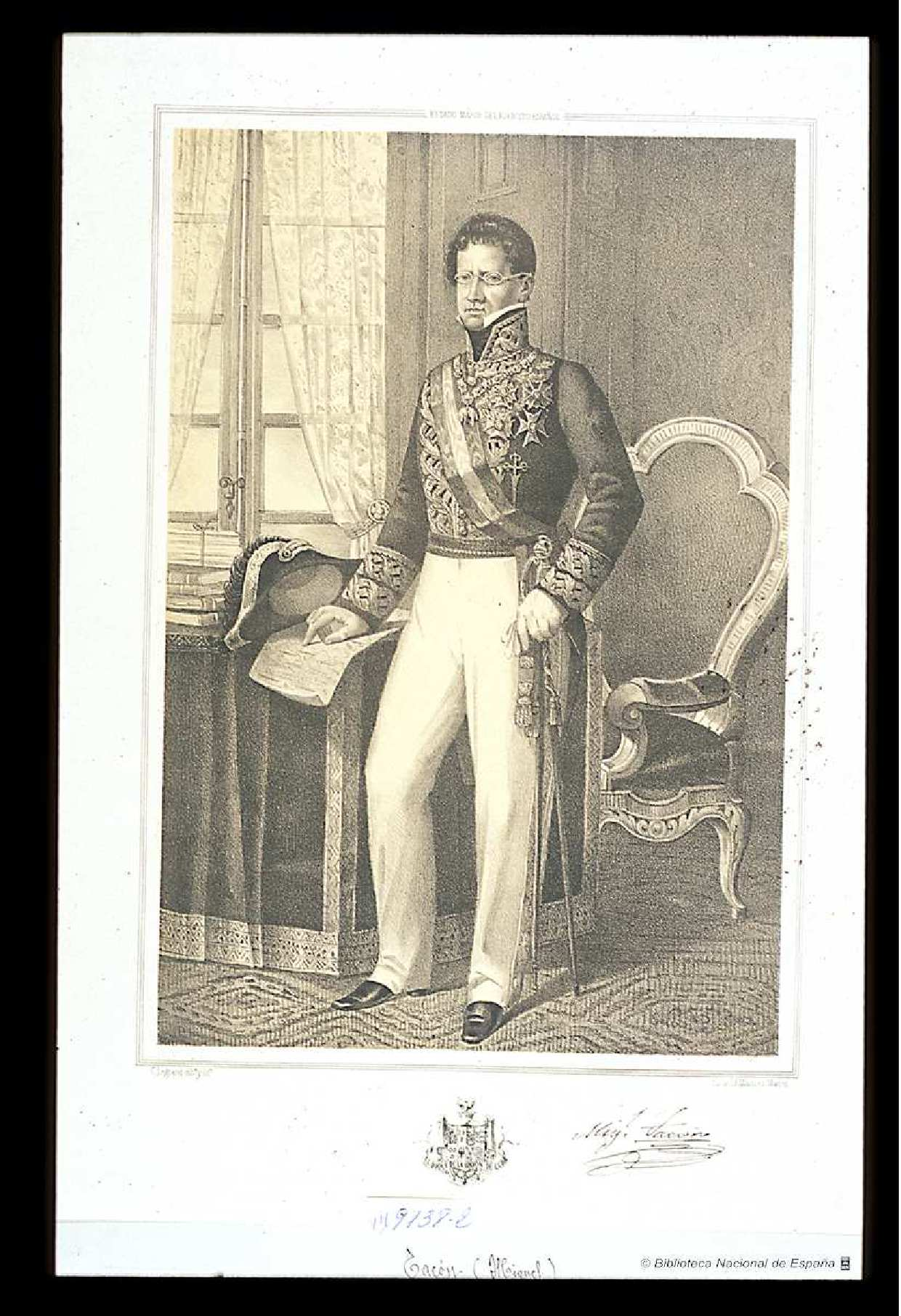
- Portrait of Miguel Tacón, lithography of Luis Carlos Legrand for the work of Pedro Chamorro y Baquerizo Estado Mayor General del Ejército Español. Biblioteca Nacional de España.

Miguel Tacón y Rosique (10 January 1777 – 13 October 1855), also known as Miguel Tacón, was a Spanish soldier and colonial administrator in the Spanish Americas. From 1834 to 1838, he was Governor of Cuba.

== Biography ==
Miguel Tacón y Rosique was born on 10 January 1777, in Cartagena, Spain. He was the son of Miguel Antonio Tacón y Fosca, a brigadier in the Spanish Royal Army, and of María Francisca Rosique y Ribera.

In March 1806, he was named civil and military Governor of Popayán Province (today's Southern Colombia). Here, he was faced with the first rebellions for independence in Ecuador and the United Provinces of New Granada. He was defeated in the Battle of Bajo Palacé (es) in 1811 and had to flee to Oruro. Here he joined the army of Viceroy of Peru Pezuela, and participated in the victories in the Battles of Vilcapugio and Viluma. He was promoted to Mariscal de Campo and returned to Spain in 1819 for health reasons.

Considered a liberal, he was sidelined during the Ominous Decade (1823-1833) in which King Ferdinand VII reestablished a conservative Absolute Monarchy. In 1834, he was appointed Governor of Cuba, where he arrived on 7 June. His good governance of the island in daily matters and public works, especially in Havana, thanks to the zeal of the mayor Claudio Martínez de Pinillos, was overshadowed by his despotic style and his promotion of slave trade. Named after him in Havana were : the Tacón Theatre, Paseo de Tacón, Mercado de Tacón and Tacón Garden.

After his return to Spain in 1838, he was Spanish Ambassador to Great Britain in 1844 and from 1847 to 1848. In 1847, he was ennobled to the Duque de la Unión de Cuba and received in the Order of the Golden Fleece. In 1853, during the reign of Isabel II, he was appointed senator for life.

He died on 13 October 1855, in Madrid.

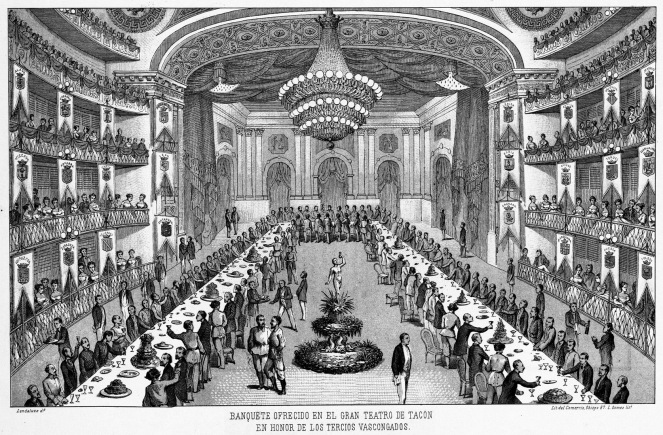
Teatro Tacón

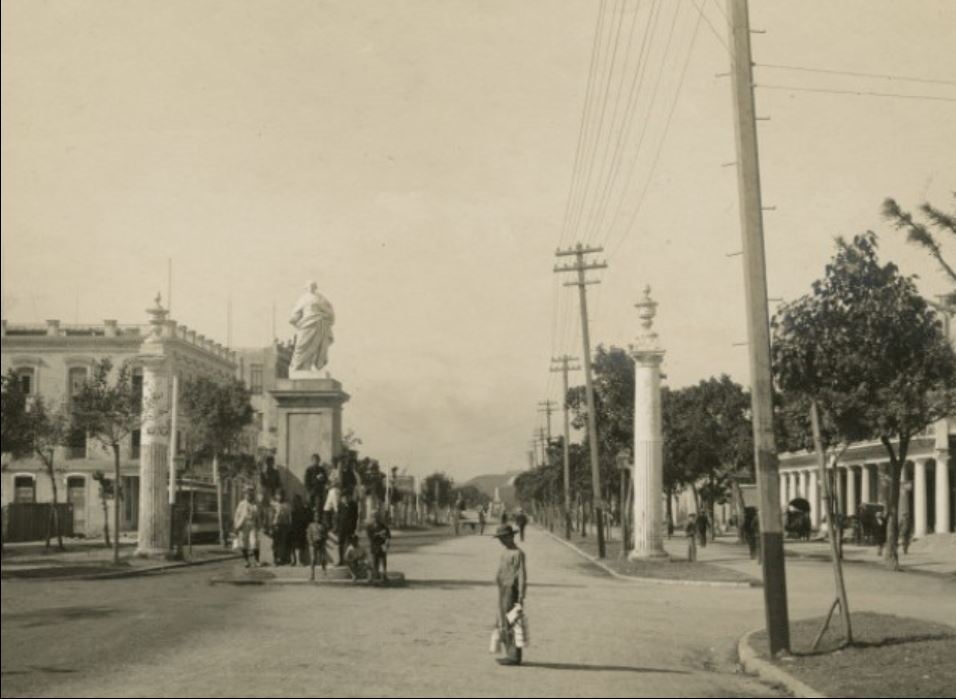
Paseo de Tacón

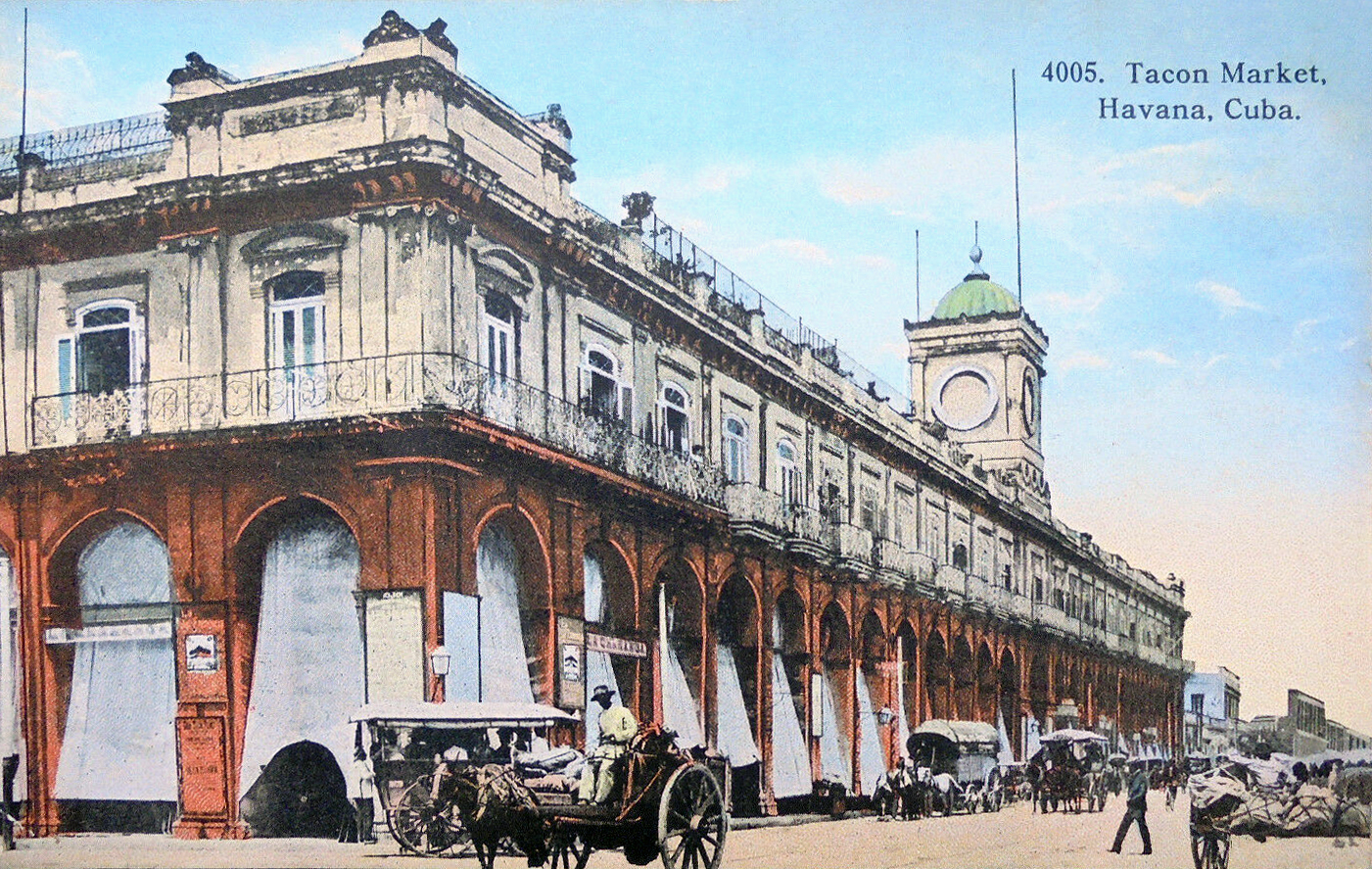
Mercado de Tacón
