= Abolition of slavery in Spain =

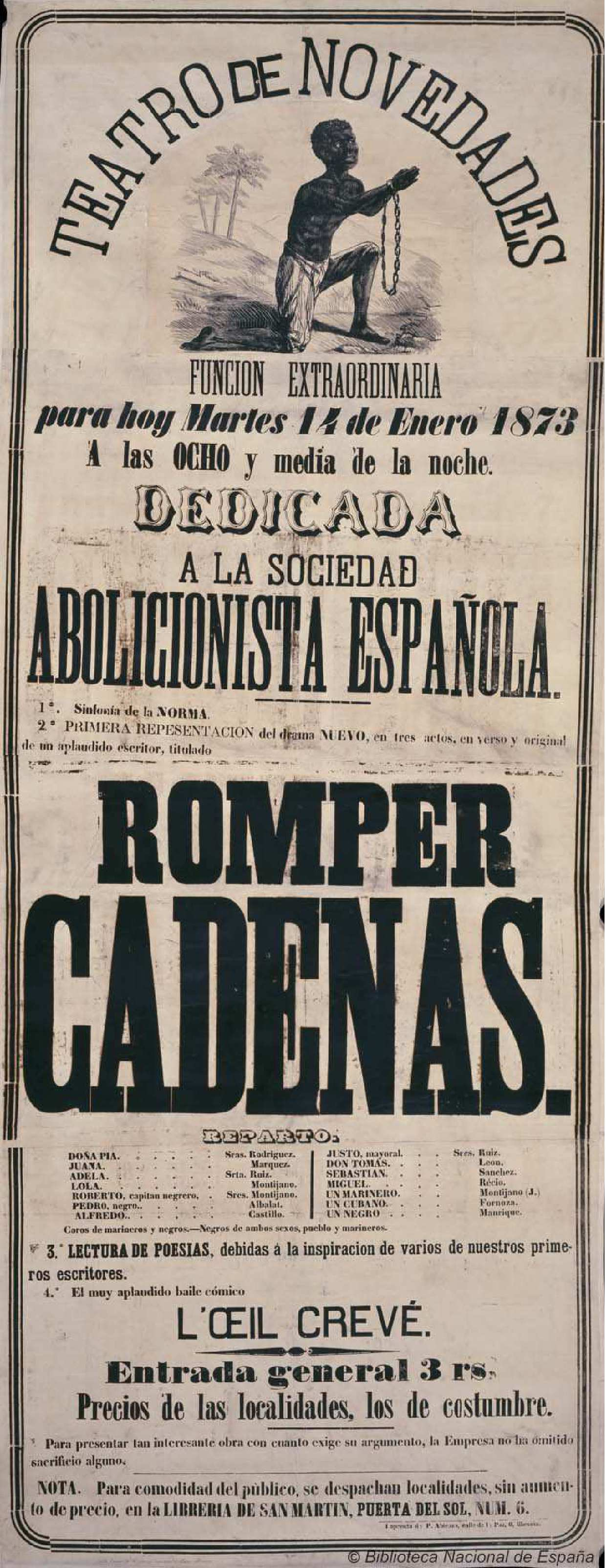
- Poster for a special performance at the Novedades Theatre in Madrid dedicated to the Spanish Abolitionist Society, announcing the premiere of Romper cadenas, a three-act drama by Luis Blanc, presented on January 14, 1873. National Library of Spain.
- Location: Spain, Spanish Empire
- Participants: Spanish Abolitionist Society, First Spanish Republic, Liberal government under Práxedes Mateo Sagasta, Conservative government under Antonio Cánovas del Castillo
- Outcome: Abolition of the slave trade in 1820; abolition of slavery in Puerto Rico in 1873; abolition of slavery in Cuba in 1886

The abolition of slavery in Spain began in 1820 with the abolition of the slave trade under pressure from Great Britain, although illegal clandestine trade continued with the support of governments and the crown. The definitive abolition of slavery in the Spanish colonial empire came sixty years later. Although the First Spanish Republic approved the abolition of slavery in Puerto Rico, it was not until 1886 that the Liberal government of Práxedes Mateo Sagasta ended the "patronato" system for freed slaves in Cuba, implementing a law passed in 1880 under the Conservative government of Antonio Cánovas del Castillo. As Eduardo Galván Rodríguez has noted, "Spain was the last Western power to abolish slavery."

== Background ==
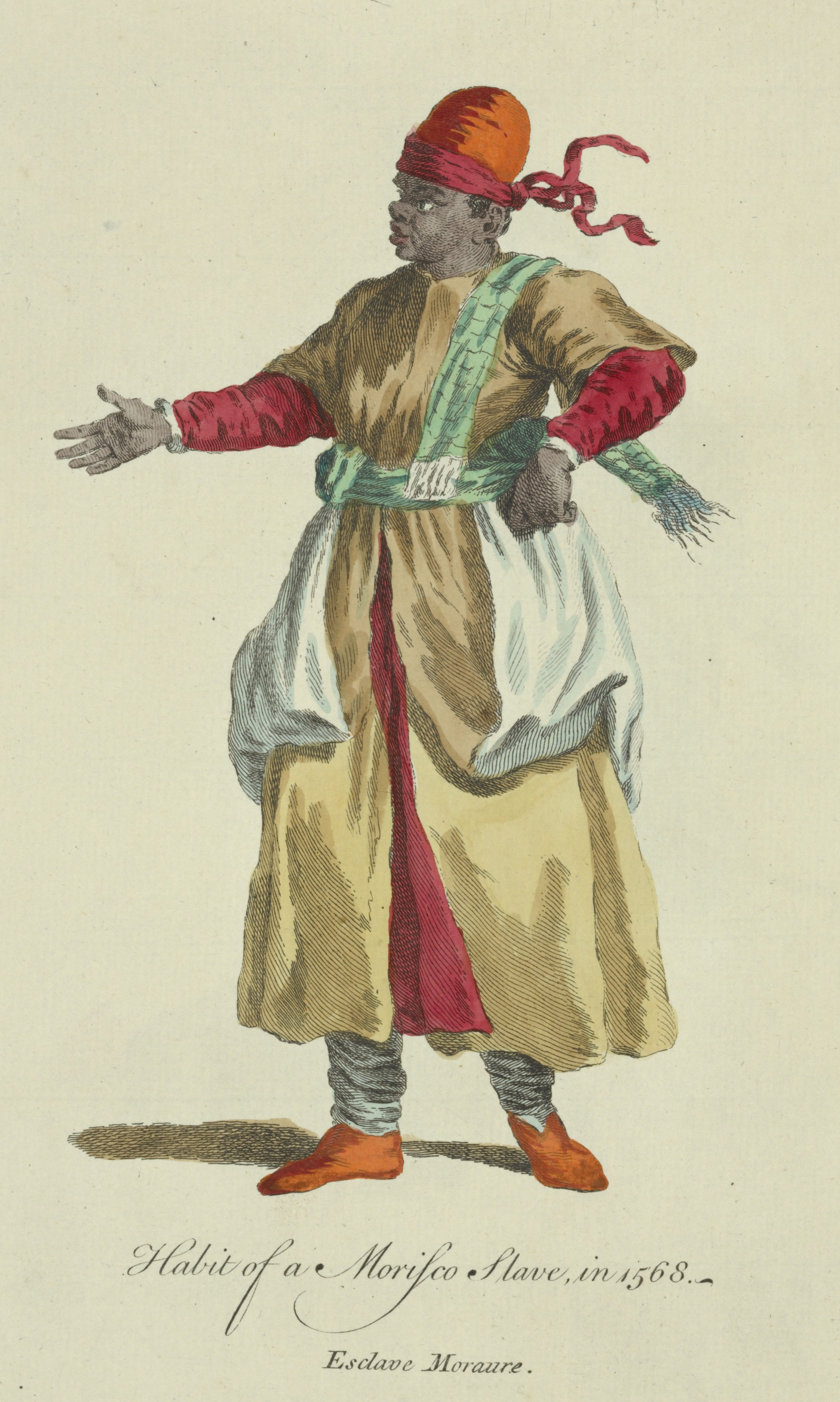
Morisco slave in the fashion of 1568. Colored watercolor engraving from Recueil des habillements de différentes nations, anciennes et modernes..., London, Thomas Jefferys, 1757.

During the 16th, 17th, and 18th centuries, few authors opposed slavery, while works justifying and legitimizing it, particularly regarding barbarians, infidels, and Black people, were abundant. "Slavery is considered an accepted and sanctioned social practice by laws and Christian doctrine, from the Bible to Saint Paul and Saint Thomas," noted José Antonio Piqueras. "In America, it was common among wealthy men and women and even among ordinary people if they could afford it. In the Peninsula, the nobility and clergy owned slaves," Piqueras added.

In the first half of the 16th century, the Dominican friar Bartolomé de las Casas denounced the enslavement of indigenous people and sent numerous writings to King Charles of Habsburg to end it, achieving success in 1542 with the approval of the New Laws. As an alternative, Las Casas advocated bringing Black slaves to America to perform the hardest tasks previously done by indigenous people. However, in the last third of his life, he regretted this and also condemned the slavery of Black people as "equally unjust as that of the indigenous". His change of stance was reportedly triggered by a 1547 visit to Lisbon—then Europe’s main slave-trading port—where Portuguese Dominicans informed him about the brutal capture of Black slaves on African coasts and provided books on Portuguese conquests in Africa and Asia. The case of the freed Black man Pedro Carmona from Puerto Rico, who was re-enslaved along with his wife and whom Las Casas helped file an appeal with the Council of the Indies around the same time—paying the bail to free him from prison after being declared a "fugitive slave"—also influenced him.

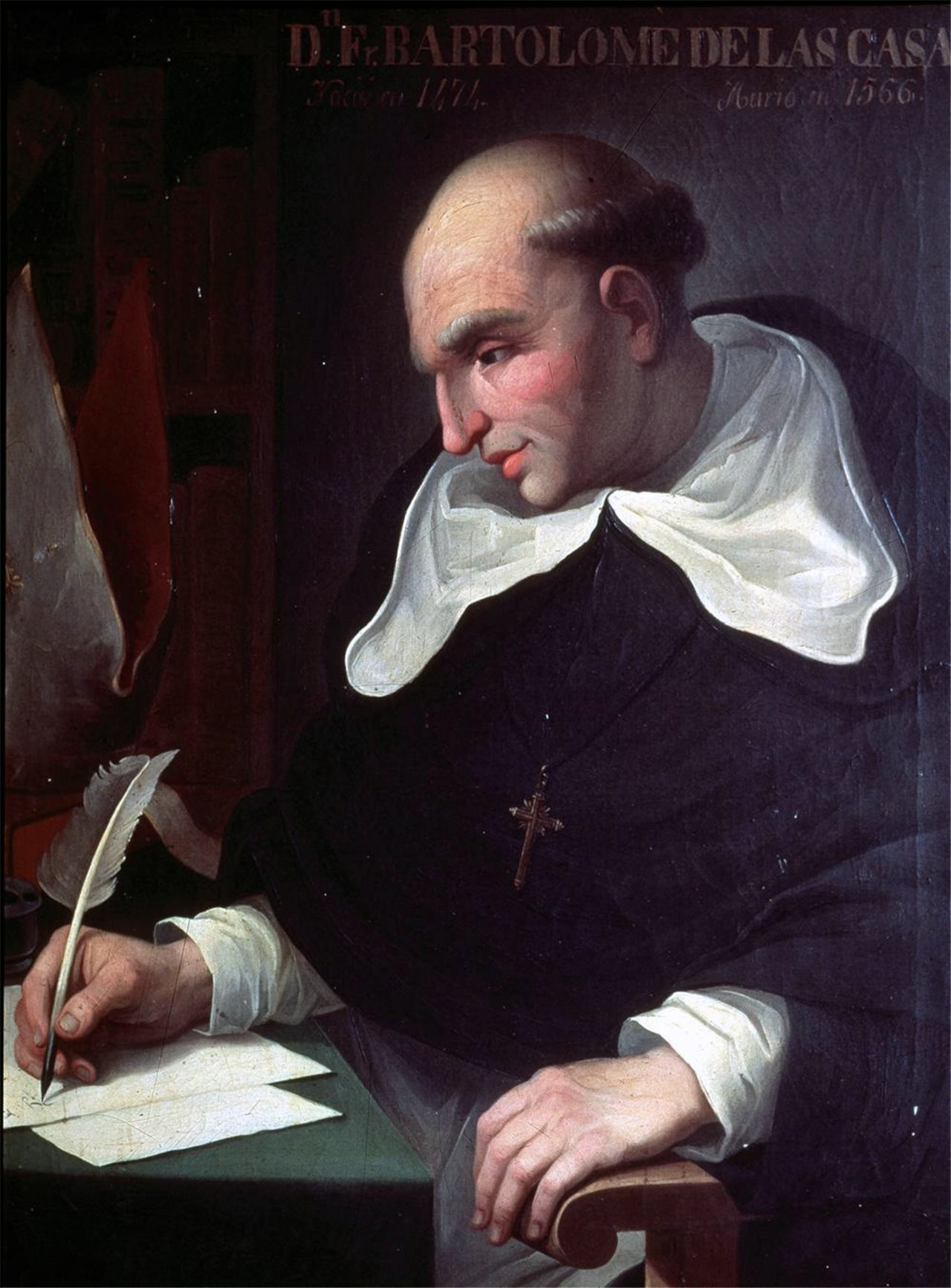
Bartolomé de las Casas, who in the last third of his life also condemned the slavery of Black people as "equally unjust as that of the indigenous."

However, unlike his denunciation of indigenous slavery, Las Casas’ defense of Black slaves "did not gain much traction", as Magdalena Díaz Hernández noted, primarily because his History of the Indies (completed between 1555 and 1561), which dedicated six chapters to the issue, was not published until 1875 due to an explicit ban by King Philip II, Charles’ son and successor, on printing any book related to the Indies under severe penalties, including death. In those six chapters, Las Casas refutes the idea that Black people captured in Africa were enslaved as a result of a "just war," arguing instead that what occurred were "cruel wars, massacres, captivities, total destruction, and annihilation of many peaceful and secure peoples... who never opposed, harmed, waged war, or obstructed the faith, nor ever thought to impede it."

Since Las Casas’ History of the Indies was not published until 1875, the Arte de los contratos by Bartolomé de Albornoz, published in 1573, is often considered the first work to challenge the slave trade, deeming the capture and purchase of Africans contrary to natural law and describing their trade as "butchery". However, the book was banned by the Spanish Inquisition. Two years later, Tomás de Mercado published Summa de tratos y contratos, questioning the causes of slavery and criticizing the dramatic conditions of the transport of African slaves to America, which he witnessed firsthand during his years in New Spain. In 1627, the Jesuit Alonso de Sandoval also denounced the slave trade in his De instauranda Æthiopum salute.

The first to clearly reject slavery—and the associated trade—were two Capuchin friars, Francisco José de Jaca and Epifanio de Moirans, who met in Havana and were expelled in 1682 for preaching the freedom of Black slaves. Francisco José de Jaca wrote Resolución sobre la libertad, delegitimizing slavery because humans were free by nature. Moirans wrote Servi liberi, similarly defending the freedom of slaves, stating, "All men are free." Both were deported and brought before the Council of the Indies, which barred them from returning to America. They ended their days in Rome.

José Antonio Piqueras has highlighted "the near absence of anti-slavery thought in Spain between the 16th and 19th centuries," contrasting with other European countries where works challenging slavery and the Atlantic slave trade proliferated, especially from the second half of the 18th century. Piqueras attributes this to Spain’s creation of "perfect conditions for intolerance of difference" and the formation of "a social hierarchy that found the slavery of those of ‘infamous’ origin natural."

== Cortes of Cádiz (1810–1814): First (failed) abolition attempt ==
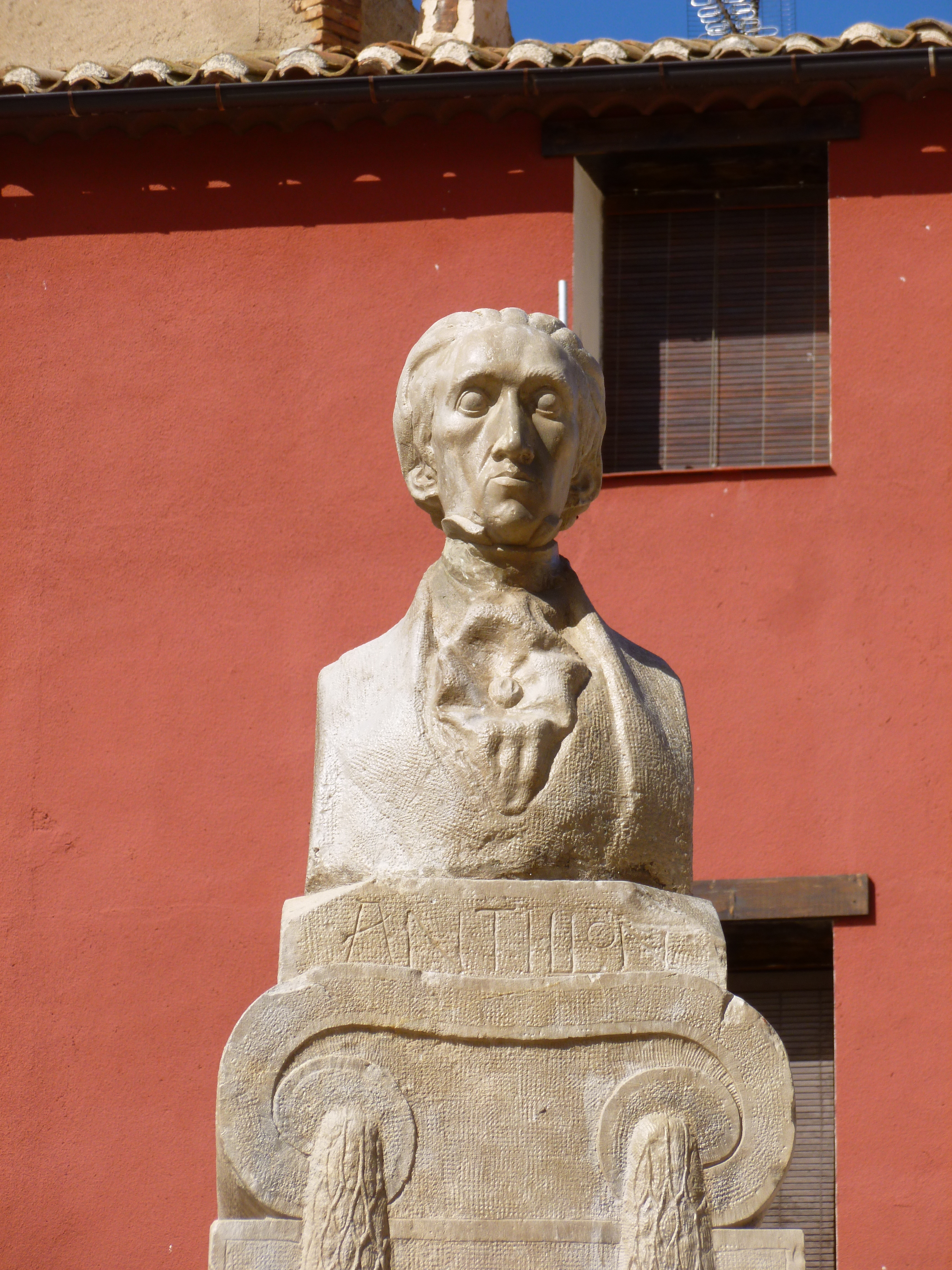
Statue dedicated to Isidoro de Antillón, a pioneer in defending the abolition of slavery, in his hometown Santa Eulalia del Campo (Province of Teruel).

Some liberal deputies of the Cortes of Cádiz spoke out against the African slave trade, shortly after the United Kingdom abolished the slave trade in the British Empire in 1807. The most immediate Spanish precedent available to the deputies was the Dissertation against "ignominious slavery" and the slave trade, the "infamous system", presented by the enlightened Isidoro de Antillón at the Madrid Academy of Law in 1802, five years before Britain’s ban, making him a pioneer of European and global abolitionism. The full title of the Dissertation was Dissertation on the origin of Black slavery, the reasons for its perpetuation, the advantages attributed to it, and the means that could be adopted to make our colonies prosper without it. However, the Dissertation was not published until July 1811, shortly after the April debate in the Cortes of Cádiz on the abolition of slavery. In the Dissertation, Antillón argued that the trade and slavery of Black people, "infamous, a stain and blemish on European culture," "dishonors the philosopher and shames enlightened governments".

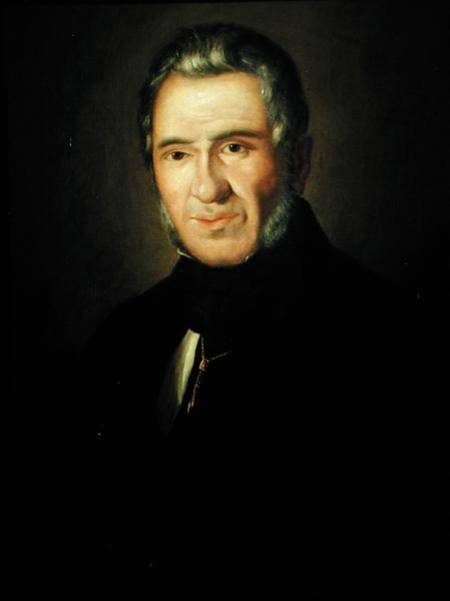
Portrait of Agustín Argüelles, a deputy of the Cortes of Cádiz who proposed the abolition of the "infamous" slave trade.

On April 2, 1811, the Cortes of Cádiz debated two proposals: one for the gradual abolition of slavery, as it was "contrary to natural law," presented by the New Spain deputy José Miguel Guridi y Alcocer, and another by Agustín Argüelles, leader of the liberals, to ban the "infamous" slave trade, following Britain’s example, then an ally of the "patriots" in the Spanish War of Independence. The latter did not include abolishing slavery itself, as Argüelles believed it was not the time to debate it due to the "issue... requiring the utmost caution, given the painful example in Santo Domingo," referring to the Haitian Revolution that began in 1791. Guridi y Alcocer’s proposal, which also included ending the slave trade, "envisioned declaring free the [slaves] born henceforth from enslaved women (known as free womb), abolishing physical punishments, paying a small wage to slaves remaining in captivity, and recognizing their right to coartation [self-purchase] at the price they were acquired. This abolitionist plan, for gradual extinction, would take 60 to 70 years to be fully recognized."

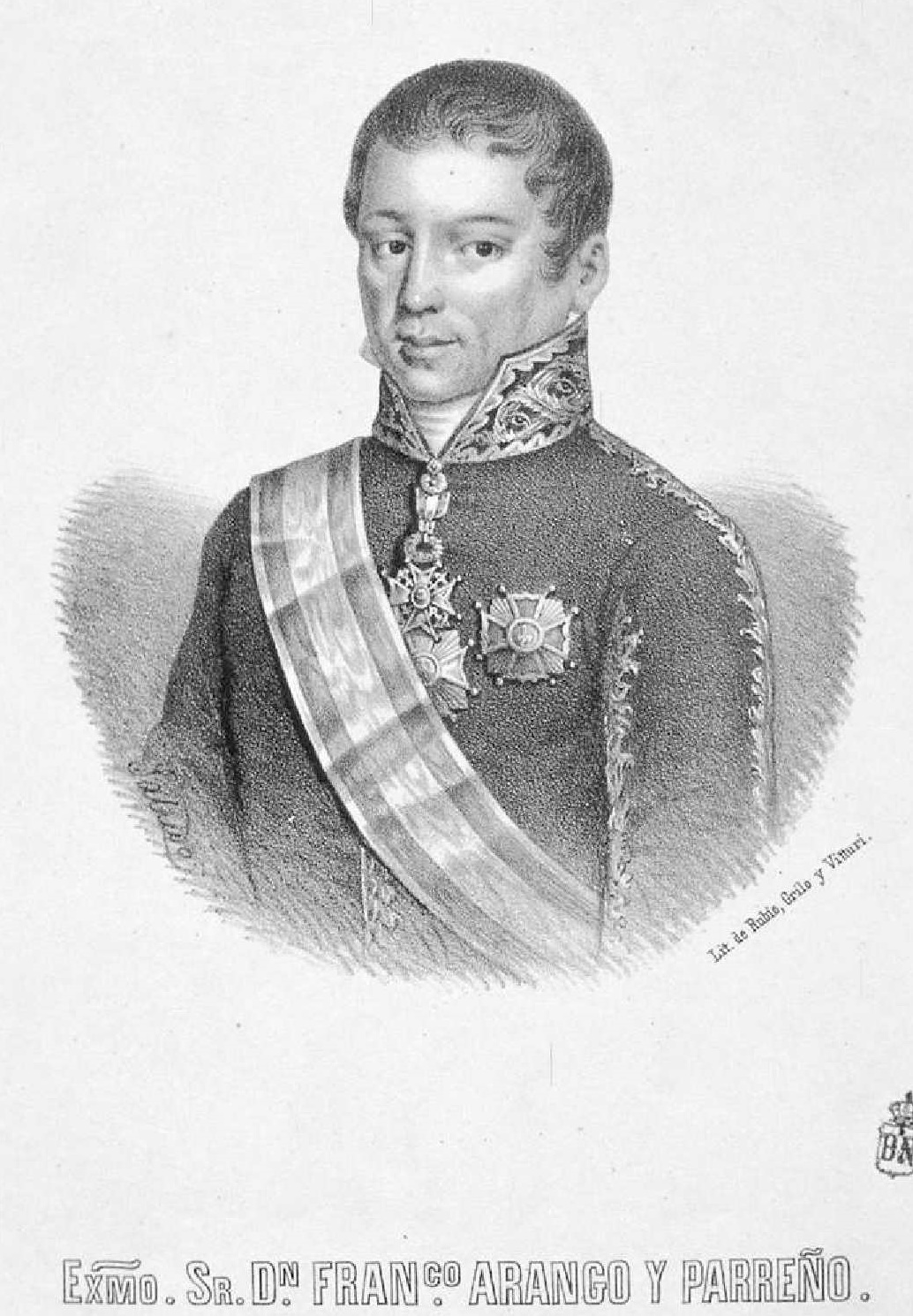
Portrait of Francisco de Arango y Parreño, who authored the representation submitted by the Council of Havana in favor of preserving slavery and the slave trade.

The debate caused great alarm in Cuba, and the Captain General of the island and the Council of Havana sent representations to the Cortes expressing strong opposition to both proposals—the Havana council’s was drafted by deputy Francisco de Arango y Parreño, born in the Cuban capital. Regarding the suppression of the slave trade, Arango argued it would lead Cuba to poverty, as no estate had sufficient Black slaves, and "very few have females". The Cuban pressure was effective—supported by absolutist deputies and some liberals—and neither issue was discussed again in the Cortes, only mentioned tangentially, with the commission meant to address them never formed.

The Spanish Constitution of 1812 enshrined the existence of slavery. Article 3.1 stated that "Spaniards are all free men born and residing in the domains of Spain," implicitly recognizing the existence of non-free men and women. Article 18 established that "citizens are those Spaniards who, on both sides, trace their origin to the Spanish domains in both hemispheres," a formula excluding those of African origin—"simply because they were descendants of slaves while slavery remained in force", as José Antonio Piqueras noted. Article 22 opened "the door of virtue and merit to become citizens" for "Spaniards who by any line are considered and reputed to be of African origin." It continued: "consequently, the Cortes will grant a citizen’s letter to those who render qualified services to the homeland or distinguish themselves by talent, diligence, and conduct, provided they are born of a legitimate marriage to free parents, married to a free woman, and residing in the domains of Spain, and exercise a profession, trade, or useful industry with their own capital." This article has been described by José Antonio Piqueras as a "miserable gesture of condescension".

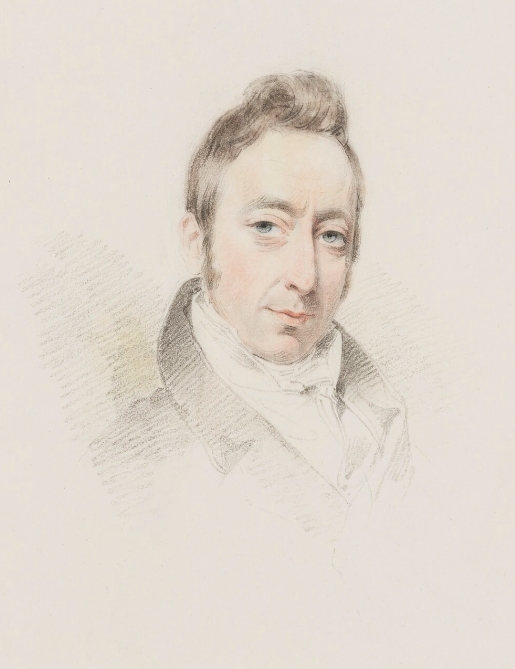
Portrait of José María Blanco White from 1812, when he was already exiled in England. In 1814, he published in London a work against slavery and the slave trade titled Bosquejo del comercio de esclavos y reflexiones sobre el tráfico considerado moral, política y cristianamente.

From his exile in England, the liberal José María Blanco White—who had coincided with Antillón in Seville and frequently addressed slavery in El Español (1810–1814), reproducing some parliamentary speeches by the British abolitionist William Wilberforce—published in London in 1814 Bosquejo del comercio de esclavos y reflexiones sobre el tráfico considerado moral, política y cristianamente, a work "whose importance is equal to or greater than Antillón’s Dissertation," according to José María Martínez de Pisón Cavero. In it, Blanco White defended—against the "shameful capitulation" of the liberals in the Cortes of Cádiz— the abolition of the slave trade and slavery, though he was cautious about implementation, warning that "if all [slaves] were freed at once," there was a risk "they might turn to disorder instead of freedom, to pillage instead of industry", leading to the "ruin of a large portion of owners, resulting in desolation and universal upheaval". Blanco White highlighted the double standard of those who opposed torture "while considering it a most difficult problem to decide whether we have the right to torment an unlimited number of ‘innocents’."

== Reigns of Ferdinand VII and Isabella II (1814–1868): Abolition in the Peninsula and the "Golden Age" of the "Illegal" Slave Trade ==
Evidence of changing European perceptions of the slave trade after the Napoleonic Wars was the Declaration of the Powers on the Slave Trade of February 8, 1815, from the Congress of Vienna, signed by absolutist monarchies and the British monarchy—which proposed the declaration against the "infamous trade" it had banned in 1807. Following the declaration, the United Kingdom pressured other European monarchies to abolish the slave trade in their domains. A primary target was the monarchy of Ferdinand VII, who signed a treaty with Britain on September 23, 1817, abolishing the slave trade in the Spanish Empire in exchange for £400,000. The first article of the treaty stated:

From this time forward, it shall not be lawful for any subject of the Crown of Spain to purchase slaves or carry on the slave trade.

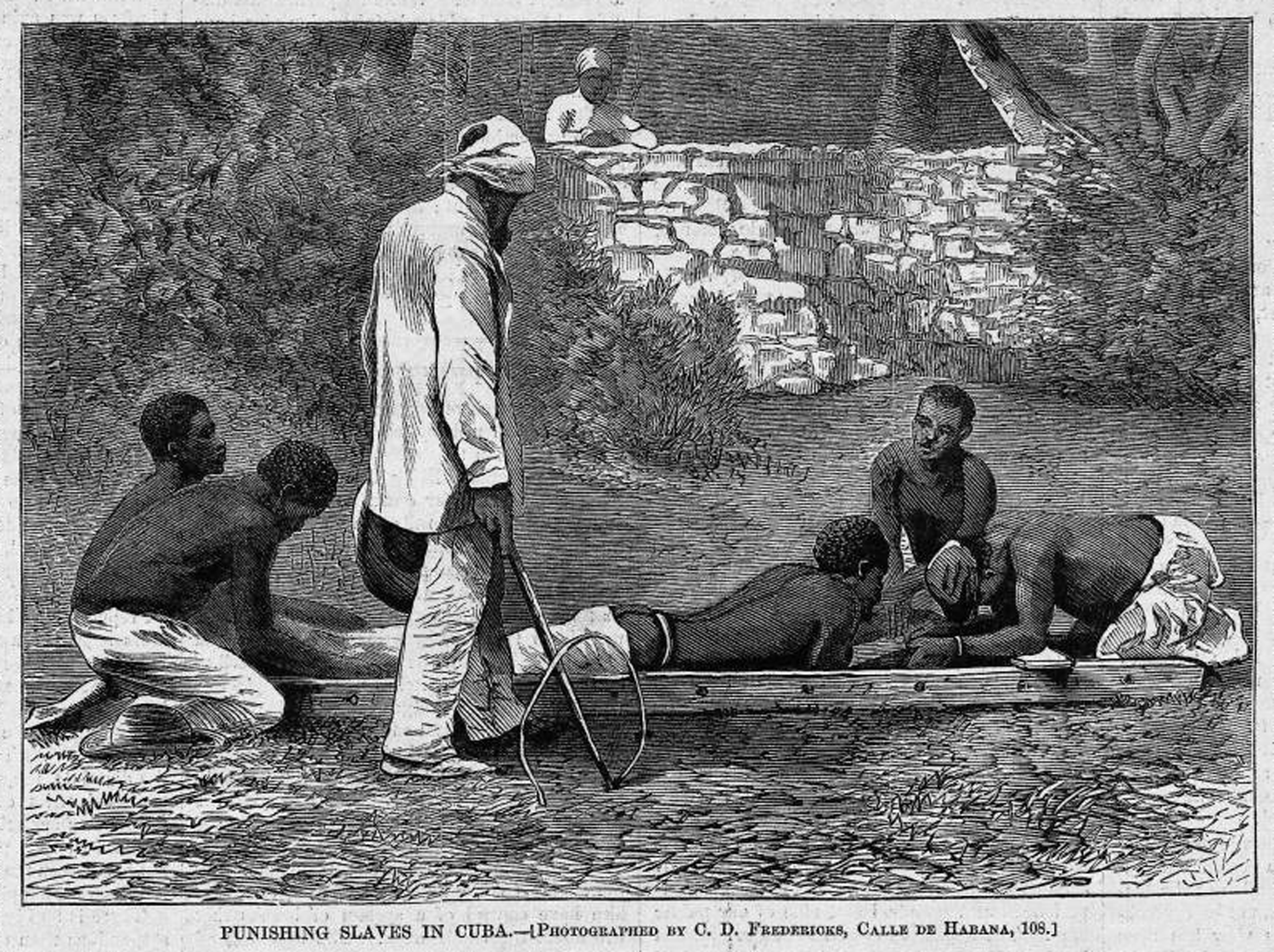
Illustration from Harper's Weekly (1868) depicting slavery in Cuba. It shows a scene where slaves tie another to a ladder for "interrogation" by the master, who holds a whip.

Francisco Arango—who remained in Spain and was appointed by Ferdinand VII to the Council of the Indies—secured a delay in the treaty’s enforcement until 1820. In a plea to the king, endorsed by six other councilors, he argued that "under no circumstances can we agree to an immediate ban on the slave trade" because "the American provinces, in the sad necessity of cultivating their lands with slaves, have no means to replace those who die or are [hanged]," noting that in none of "the estates in America... is the number of females proportionate to males." Thus, "it would abruptly close all sources of prosperity". He also used a blatantly racist argument: "We worry about barbarians without order or civilization who have never used their freedom except to sell or devour each other." In 1834, Arango was awarded the title of Marquess of Gratitude by the regent Maria Christina, who, along with her second husband Agustín Fernando Muñoz, profited from the slave trade and a Cuban sugar plantation worked by slaves.

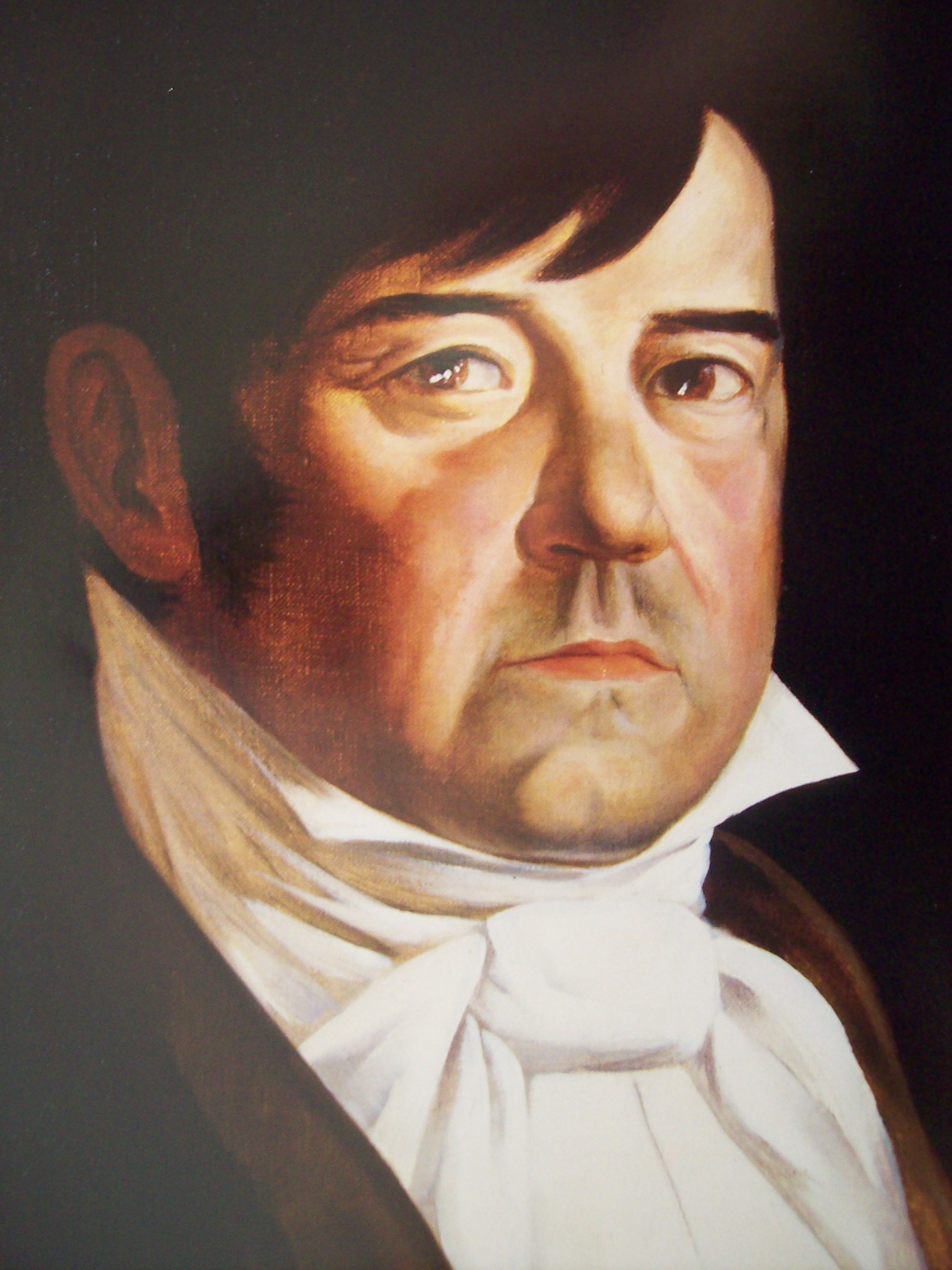
Miguel Ramos Arizpe, a New Spanish deputy in the Liberal Triennium Cortes, who proposed reviving Guridi and Argüelles’ 1811 initiatives to abolish the slave trade.

After the restoration of the constitutional monarchy in March 1820, the Cortes, elected under the Spanish Constitution of 1812, were tasked with enforcing the agreement with Britain, effective that year, to end the "inhumane trade". The New Spanish deputy Miguel Ramos Arizpe proposed reviving Guridi and Argüelles’ 1811 initiatives, and Antillón’s Dissertation was republished, with the Cortes honoring him by exhuming his remains—Antillón had died in July 1814 in his hometown Santa Eulalia due to injuries from a severe attack in November 1813 in Cádiz after a Cortes debate; in 1823, a royalist group dug up and burned his remains in the town square.

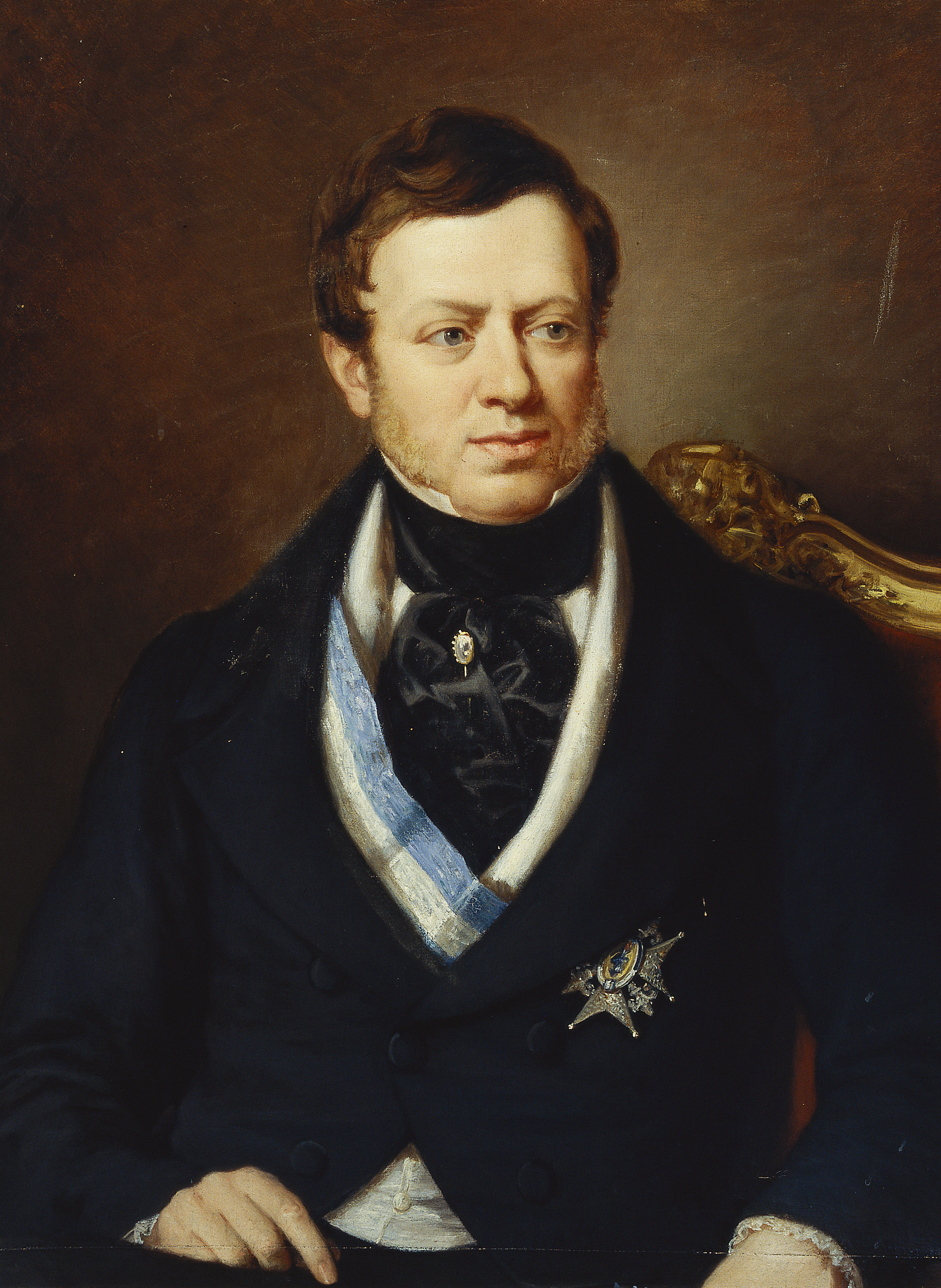
Portrait of the Count of Toreno, who presented a bill in the Liberal Triennium Cortes to abolish the slave trade, in compliance with the 1817 treaty with the United Kingdom of Great Britain and Ireland. When he became prime minister in 1835, he renewed the treaty with the British, creating the "emancipado" status, a freedman subject to conditions similar to a slave.

The liberal moderate deputy Count of Toreno called for a commission to study and propose "as soon as possible the necessary measures to suppress the African slave trade," a "shameful and inhumane trade", a motion supported by Ramos Arizpe and approved. The commission’s bill proposed severe penalties for those involved in the slave trade and for authorities allowing it—six to ten years in an African prison. Slaves seized from intercepted expeditions would be immediately freed. However, the bill, presented by the Count of Toreno in April 1821, was not passed, sabotaged by several deputies in collusion with the Overseas Governance Minister, a moderate from Peru. The Cuban cleric and deputy Juan Bernardo O'Gaban, a mouthpiece for the island’s slaveholding interests and author of the pamphlet Observaciones sobre la suerte de los negros del África considerados en su propia patria, y trasplantados a las Antillas españolas, stood out in opposition. He proposed a six-year moratorium to allow estate owners to stockpile labor, "especially ‘female’ Africans for the preservation of the species and estates," offering to reimburse the Crown the amount paid by the British, funded by island owners. According to José Antonio Piqueras, his defense of slavery "is one of the most cynical speeches we can read, alongside those by Arango."

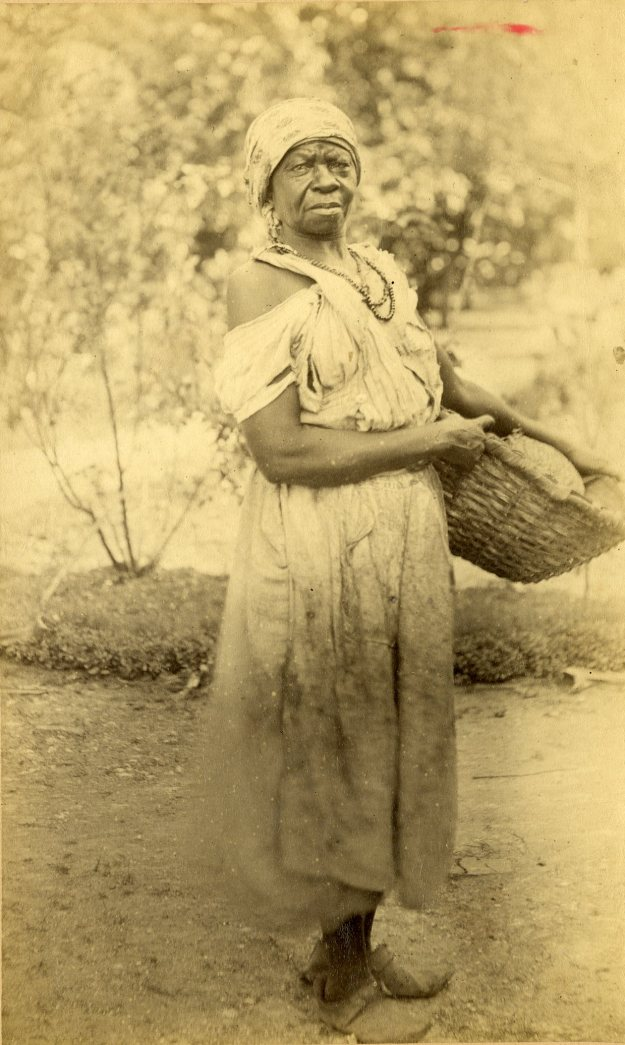
Cuban slave.

Conversely, the Cuban cleric and deputy Félix Varela fully supported banning the slave trade and the (gradual) abolition of slavery but did not speak out due to "excessive caution and a rigid interpretation of the imperative mandate that bound him to his slaveholding electors’ will." His Memoria que demuestra la necesidad de extinguir la esclavitud de los negros en la isla de Cuba, atendiendo a los intereses de sus propietarios was not published until 1886, the year slavery was abolished in Cuba, and the detailed abolition plan accompanying it was not published until 1938. The 1822 Penal Code included "the crime of slave trading", but the second absolutist restoration in Spain in 1823, ending the Liberal Triennium, prevented its enforcement.

Two years after Ferdinand VII’s death in 1833, the liberal Count of Toreno became prime minister under the Regency of Maria Christina of the Two Sicilies, and pushed for the approval of the slave trade suppression law he had proposed fourteen years earlier. As requested by the British, it allowed the capturing ship to take responsibility for the "cargo" and commit to maintaining and "educating" the "emancipados"—teaching them to be free men—while they were required to work to cover their upkeep and "education" for eight years, effectively equating the "emancipado" status to that of a slave. Many "emancipados" were "leased" to sugar plantation owners, working under conditions little different from slaves—some were even sold—under the pretext that they posed a risk of uprising in cities due to their "pernicious" example. There were even attempts to relocate them to the Spanish African colony of Fernando Poo. About 26,000 Africans lived under this "covert slave" status until the "emancipado" condition was abolished in 1870. The recognition of the "right of coartation", allowing slaves to progressively pay off their purchase price to gain freedom, had a greater impact.

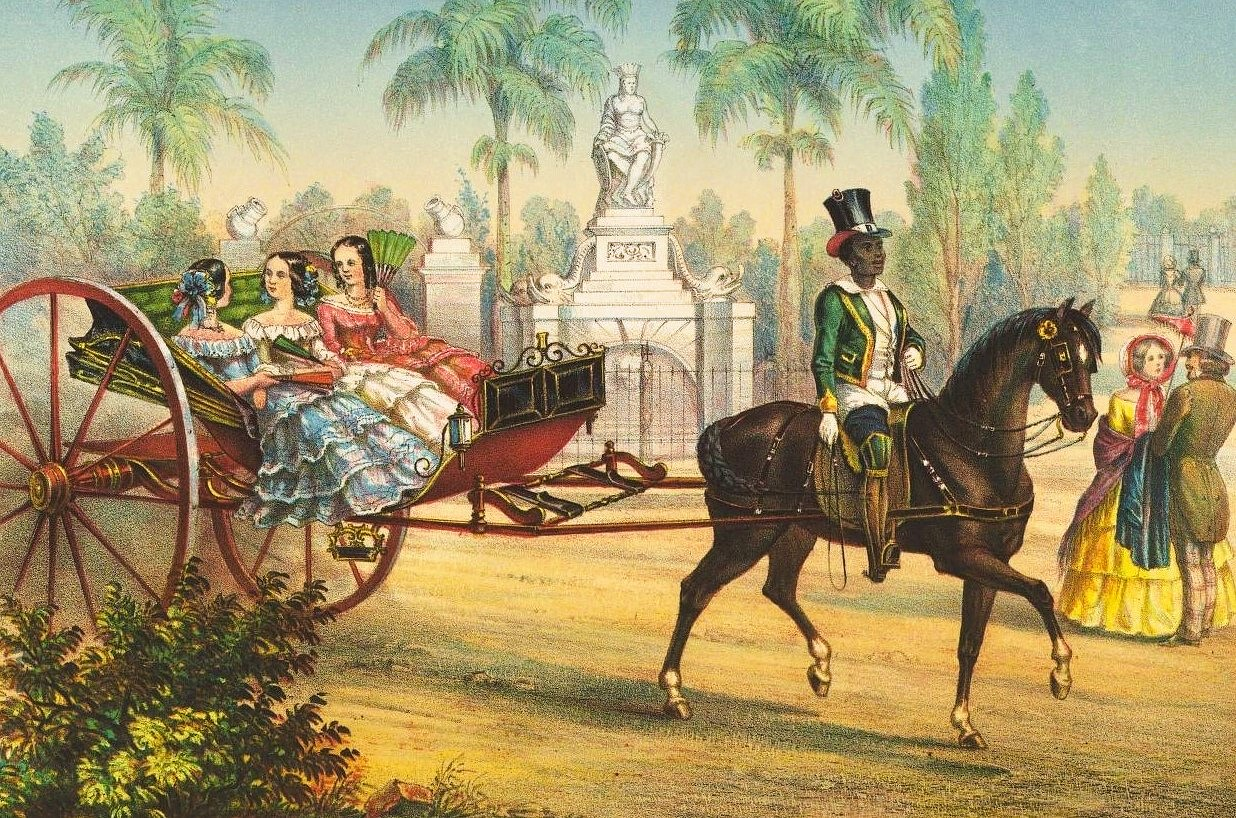
Domestic slave on horseback driving a carriage in Cuba (circa 1850).

However, despite the renewed treaty with Britain on June 28, 1835, aimed at "making more effective the means to abolish the inhumane slave trade", the slave trade not only continued but increased, and British protests and threats were ineffective. Successive Spanish governments failed to enforce the treaty and supported the "illegal" slave trade, which was also encouraged by colonial authorities. A March 1836 decree did abolish slavery in the peninsula, freeing all slaves arriving on its shores. "This highlighted the double standard of the Spanish Crown, which prohibited slavery in the metropolis but maintained it in the colonies," noted Lucena Salmoral and Lucena Giraldo. The decree justified the different treatment because "in European territory, [slavery] was repugnant to the eye and harmful to social customs," implying it was not repugnant in the colonies.

In early 1837, a law passed by the Cortes abolished slavery "in the peninsula, adjacent islands, and Spanish possessions in Africa," stating: "slavery, an affront to modern civilization and culture, is incompatible with the principles of freedom and humanity professed by the Spanish people; and it requires a law declaring its complete abolition in European territory." "Once again, the overseas possessions are absent from the text," commented Eduardo Galván Rodríguez. The argument for not extending abolition to "overseas provinces" was that "the cultivation of their richest products and their industrial processing are carried out there by slaves; thus, they are considered the necessary instrument, the only means to ensure those interests and wealth".

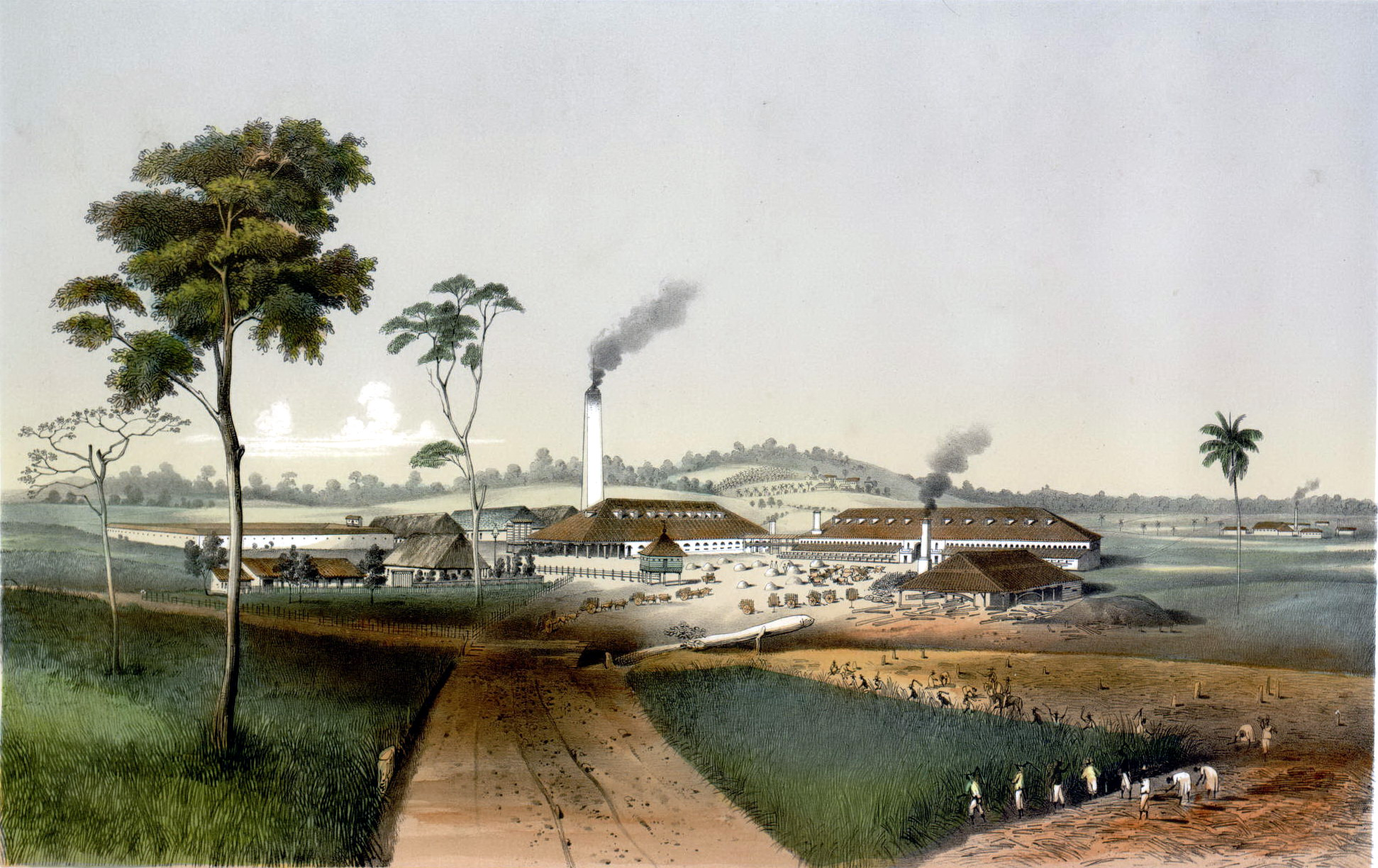
General view of the sugar plantation Santa Teresa Agüica in 1857.

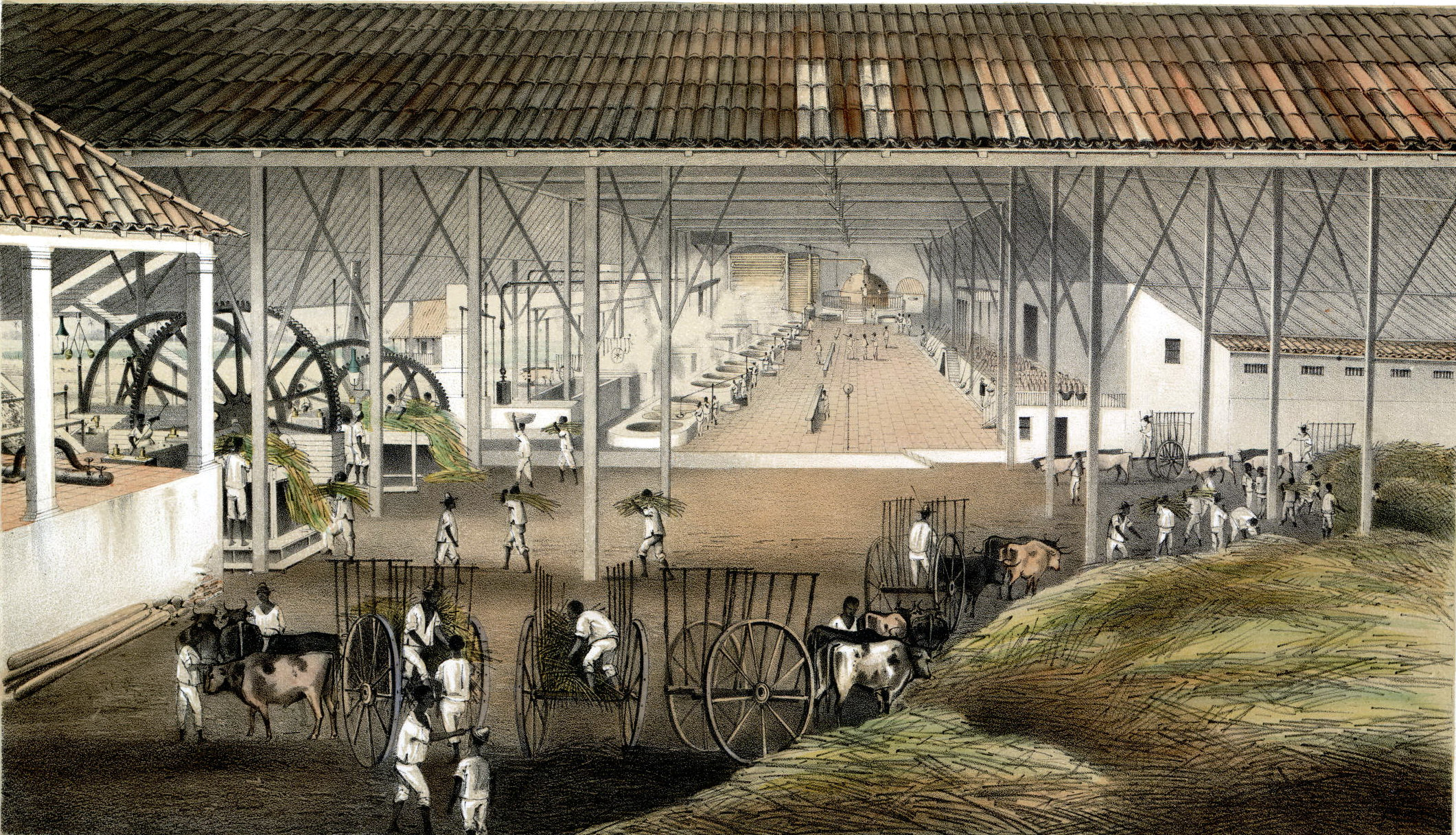
Boiler house of the sugar plantation El Progreso in 1857.

The tolerance of the "illegal" slave trade in the Antilles resulted in "Cuba and Puerto Rico receiving the largest influx of slaves in their history during this period"—over a quarter million landed in Cuba and 50,000 in Puerto Rico; official figures from 1837 reported 286,942 slaves in Cuba. Additionally, "this was the most inhumane period of the Black slave trade, as ships hid slaves in double holds and carried minimal food and water to avoid detection by [British] warships combating it," noted Lucena Salmoral and Lucena Giraldo. The growth of slavery in Puerto Rico and especially Cuba was so significant that regulations were established for the "control" and "subjugation" of Black slaves, as maroonage and uprisings began to proliferate. The Cuban Slave Regulation was enacted in November 1842.

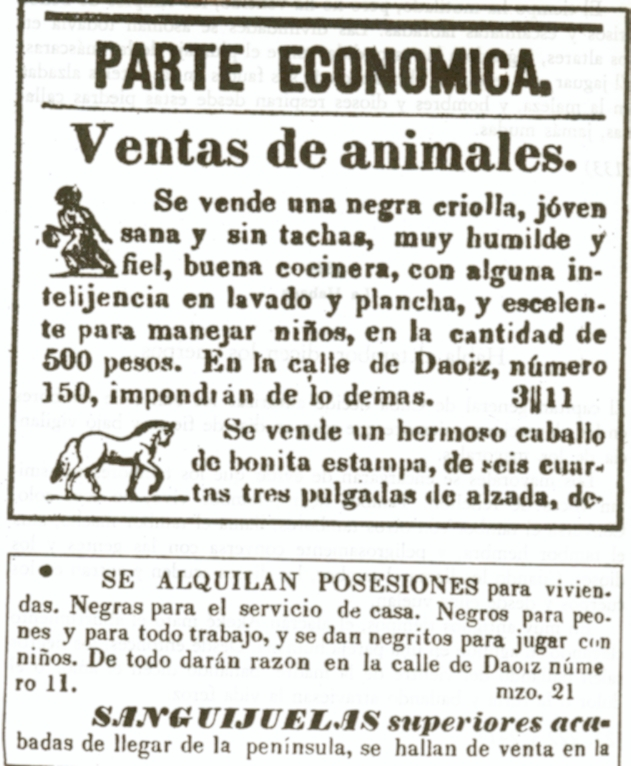
Advertisement published in Havana press in 1839. Under the heading Animal Sale, it includes the sale of a "young, healthy Creole Black woman without defects" and a "beautiful horse". Further down, it offers "PROPERTIES FOR RENT for housing. Black women for domestic service. Black men for laborers and all types of work, and young Black boys to play with children." Below, it advertises "superior LEECHES recently arrived from the peninsula."

In 1845, the Cortes passed a new law to eliminate the slave trade, which, according to José Antonio Piqueras, was "as ineffective as the one ten years earlier". In 1839, Pope Gregory XVI had condemned the African slave trade in an apostolic letter, ending "300 years of the Church’s silence on the slave trade."

During those years, a group opposing the slave trade formed in Cuba, led by affluent young men headed by the Dominican-born scholar Domingo del Monte. Described by historian José Antonio Piqueras as the "1834 generation," the group operated discreetly due to widespread support for the slave trade among Cuban estate owners, backed by the Captain General Miguel Tacón. The group maintained regular contact with the British consul in Havana, mindful that the United Kingdom had recently abolished slavery in its West Indian colonies—though they did not directly call for abolition in Cuba, fearing it would cause disorder. A member, Anselmo Suárez y Romero, encouraged by Del Monte, wrote an anti-slavery serial in 1839 titled Francisco. El Ingenio o las delicias del campo, published in 1880. The novel was based on the autobiography of the self-taught slave poet Juan Francisco Manzano, whose freedom Del Monte had purchased, with its first part translated into English by the British consul and published in London in 1840. Another anti-slavery novel, Cecilia Valdés, written by Cirilo Villaverde in 1839 and published in New York in 1882, is considered a pinnacle of 19th-century Cuban literature.

One group member, José Antonio Saco, was elected deputy in the October 1836 Spanish elections, but upon arriving in Madrid, he and other overseas representatives were expelled from the Cortes, and the new 1837 Constitution stipulated that Cuba and Puerto Rico would be governed by special laws (which were never enacted). Saco, also expelled from Cuba by Captain General Tacón, opposed the African slave trade using racist arguments. A staunch defender of a "white" Cuba, he argued that ending the slave trade would lead to the Black population’s extinction and "whitening" through miscegenation. To this end, he advocated encouraging white settler immigration. Regarding slavery, he supported gradual, compensated abolition agreed upon with owners to allow time to transition to free labor.

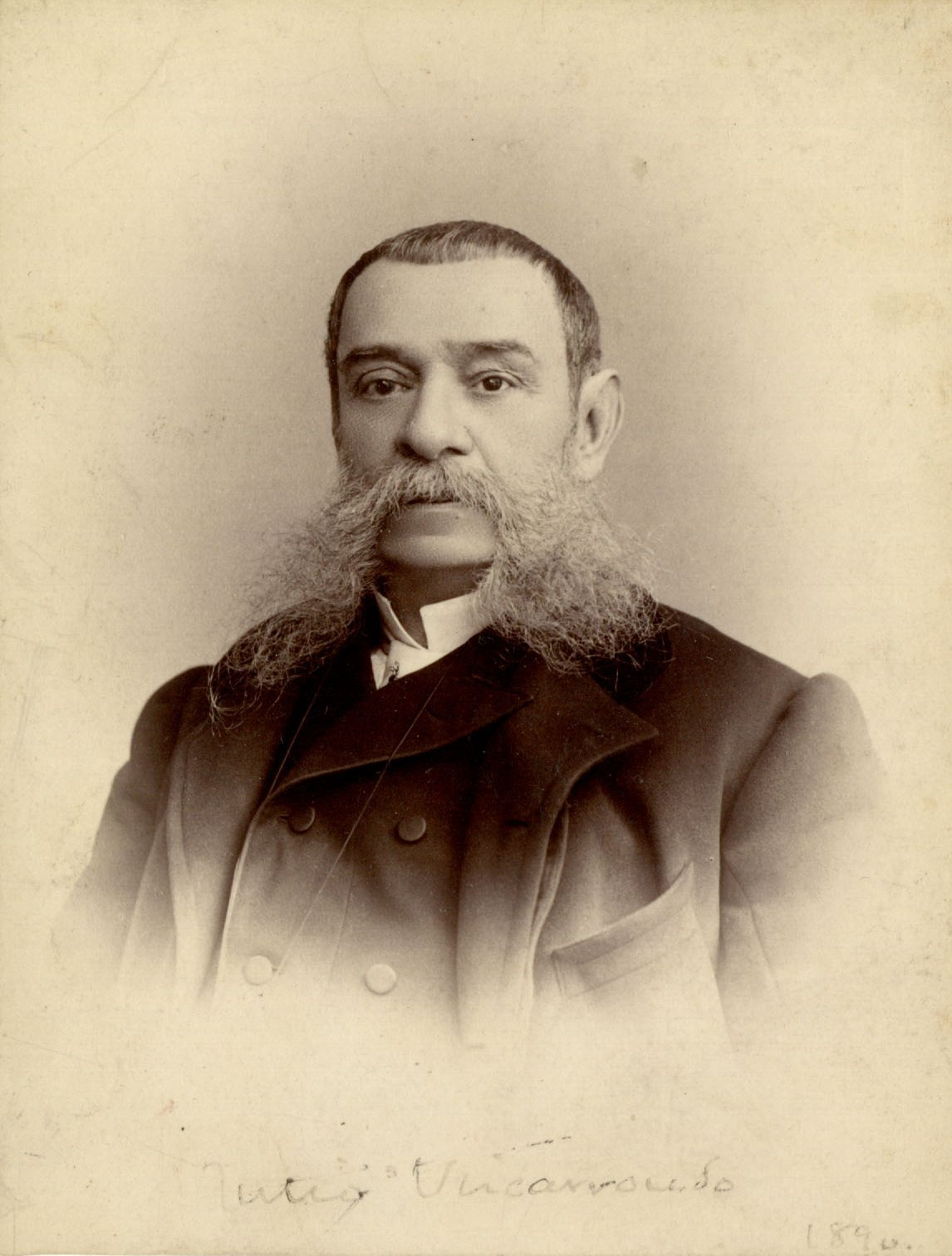
Photograph of Puerto Rican Julio Vizcarrondo, founder and main promoter of the Spanish Abolitionist Society, authorized by the government in 1865.

Following the abolition of slavery in 1865 after the Union’s victory in the Civil War, the United States pressed countries still maintaining slavery to abolish it. In this context, the Spanish government authorized the formation of the Spanish Abolitionist Society, explicitly prohibiting its establishment in overseas provinces where slavery persisted.

The Society was driven by Puerto Rican Julio Vizcarrondo and a group of friends, joined by prominent politicians like Democrat Emilio Castelar and Progressives Práxedes Mateo Sagasta and Segismundo Moret, as well as intellectuals like writer Juan Valera. It created the newspaper El Abolicionista and actively worked to achieve the definitive abolition of slavery in Spanish colonies.

In 1866, the Moderate government of General Narváez issued a decree-law, ratified by the Cortes the following year, aiming to end the tolerated slave trade. It imposed harsh penalties on slave traders and, more effectively, ordered a slave census, freeing those not listed thereafter, "dealing a decisive blow to the slave trade", according to Juan Antonio Piqueras, at a time when U.S. and British naval patrols in the Atlantic made the trade increasingly risky. Simultaneously, an Overseas Information Board, proposed by the previous government under General O’Donnell—who in 1844, as Captain General of Cuba, brutally suppressed an alleged slave rebellion known as the Conspiracy of the Ladder—met in Madrid. Chaired by Alejandro Oliván, a former minister and agent for slave traders and owners in the 1830s Cortes, the Cuban delegates accepted the inevitable end of the slave trade and argued for gradual abolition—starting with slaves over 60—and compensation for slave owners. They endorsed the free womb principle (children of enslaved women would not be slaves) but under the "patronato" of the mother’s owner until age 18 or 21. Finally, they demanded that government measures be consulted with Cuban and Puerto Rican corporations.

== Democratic Sexennium (1868–1874): "Moret Law" and Abolition in Puerto Rico ==
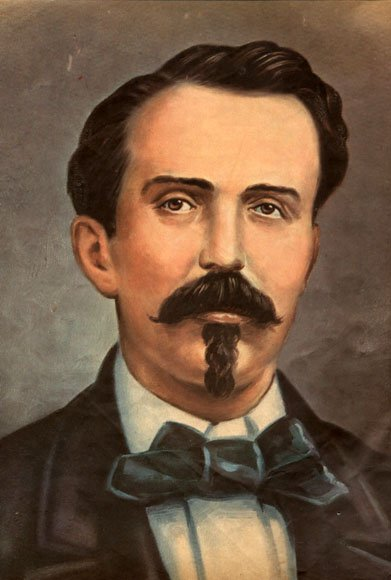
Carlos Manuel de Céspedes. He led the Cuban independence rebellion that started the Ten Years' War and chaired the rebel Guáimaro Assembly that approved the abolition of slavery on the island.

A month after the September 1868 revolution, which ended the reign of Isabella II, an independence uprising began in Eastern Cuba (following the Grito de Yara), leading to the long war. The Guáimaro Constituent Assembly of the insurgents in July 1869 decreed the complete and uncompensated abolition of slavery, convinced that the Spanish government’s "unconditional abolition" was "imminent", prompting them to "anticipate" it. Many slaves joined the rebel forces after this decision.

Western island estate owners, where sugar plantations reliant on slave labor were concentrated (with about 300,000 slaves in Cuba at the time), launched an intense campaign to pressure colonial authorities and the Madrid government to defend slavery, with the Spanish Casino in Havana as the agitation’s hub, and formed militias to fight the insurgents. Meanwhile, the United States pressured the Spanish provisional government under General Prim, threatening to recognize the rebels if slavery was not abolished.

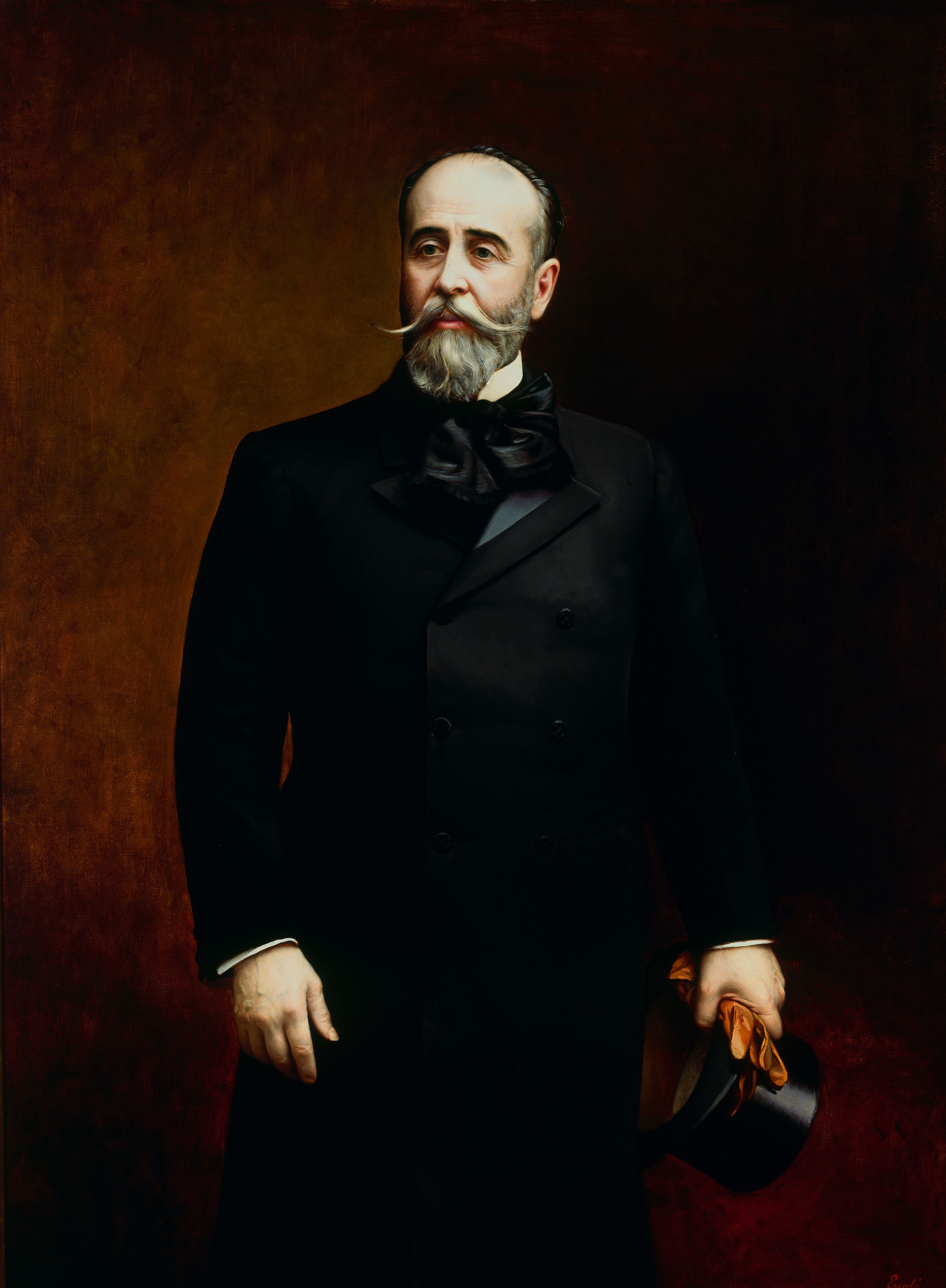
Segismundo Moret (in 1901), member of the Spanish Abolitionist Society and promoter of the law bearing his name, the first step toward abolishing slavery in Spanish colonies.

Fearing U.S. intervention, Prim tasked Overseas Minister Manuel Becerra with drafting an abolition bill, but the "slave party" sabotaged it through a widespread press campaign, funding anti-abolition political groups, and forming a network of Hispanic-Overseas Centers, leading to Becerra’s exit from the government. He was replaced by Segismundo Moret, a Spanish Abolitionist Society member, who drafted a Preparatory Law for the Abolition of Slavery in Cuba and Puerto Rico, approved by the Cortes on June 23, 1870, after a heated debate marked by obstructionist tactics from opponents, including Francisco Romero Robledo, Ramón Ortiz de Zárate, and Antonio Cánovas del Castillo, which continued during the drafting of the law’s regulations. Romero Robledo claimed that slaves’ conditions in the colonies were "envied by free workers" and that abolishing slavery "is to hand the white race to the assassin’s dagger." Ortiz de Zárate used racist (and cynical) arguments: "That Black race, which... has less intelligence... has received in return from Providence a compensation, a much longer life than ours."

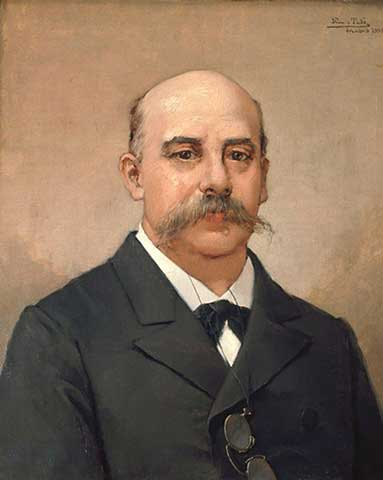
Emilio Castelar, member of the Spanish Abolitionist Society, delivered a resonant speech in the Cortes against African slavery and in defense of the Moret Law.

Republican deputy Emilio Castelar responded with "one of the most famous and widely reproduced speeches in Spain and Latin America," concluding: property "implies an appropriated thing. Prove to me that the Black man is a thing." He had previously read a Cuban advertisement—reprinted by El Abolicionista—that caused an uproar in the Chamber:

For sale: two draft mares, two Canadian mares; two Black women, mother and daughter; the mares together or separately, the Black women, mother and daughter, separately or together.

Known as the Moret Law or Free Womb Law, published on July 4, 1870, it adopted most proposals from the 1866–1867 Overseas Information Board’s Cuban reformers. It recognized free womb status from the law’s approval date—children would remain under the mother’s owner’s guardianship; freed those born after September 17, 1868, with compensation to owners; granted freedom to slaves over 60; ended the "emancipado" status that led to many abuses; and freed slaves not listed in the 1867 census. More progressive measures were withdrawn after talks with Spanish Manuel Calvo, a partner of slave traders Antonio López and Julián de Zulueta and representative of Cuban estate owners, ensuring emancipation occurred "without disturbances or setbacks". The law committed the government to submit a compensated emancipation bill for remaining slaves after the free womb decree. Article 3 granted freedom to slaves fighting for Spain in the Cuban war, but this was not enforced.

According to José Antonio Piqueras, the Moret Law was "little or not at all revolutionary", but its consequences "deeply eroded the system: for the first time, thousands of slaves were freed, slavery ceased to rely on procreation for reproduction, the owner’s rights over newborns were diminished, and family and patronage networks outside the plantation or urban owner’s house were activated to protect minors. Abolition through this means would take decades, but the progressive reduction in slave numbers forced planning for a replacement system. By 1879, the number of slaves had dropped by a third to about 200,000, due primarily to mortality but also to the cessation of natural replenishment and other effects of the law."

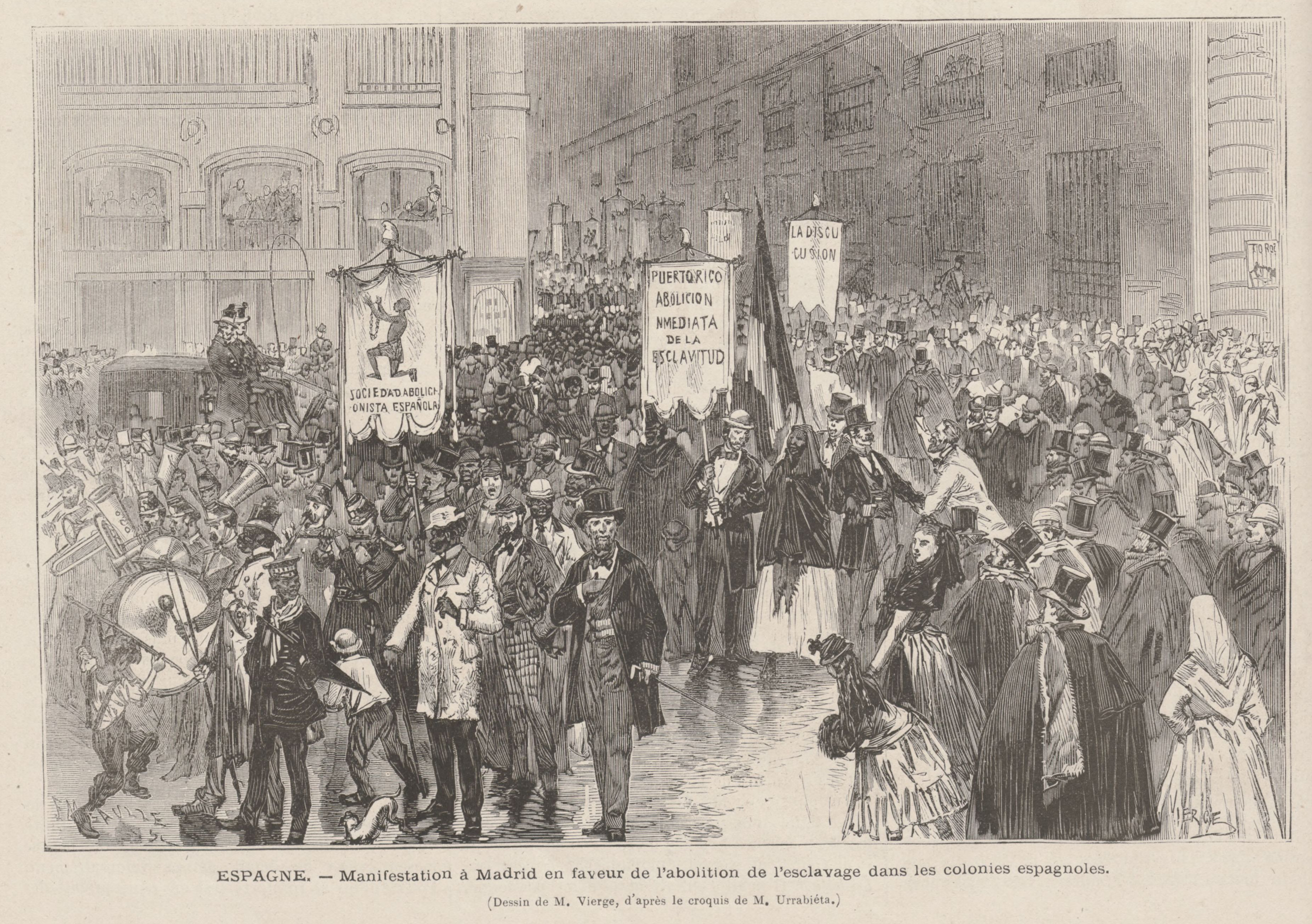
Demonstration in Madrid in favor of slavery abolition (1873).

Two years after the Moret Law, the Radical Democratic government under Manuel Ruiz Zorrilla, during the reign of Amadeo I, debated proposing a slavery abolition law for the Antilles colonies, causing tensions within the government, as Overseas Minister Eduardo Gasset y Artime favored upholding the 1869 Constituent Cortes agreement to avoid reforms in Cuba until the insurrection ended and the Moret Law was fully implemented. The Spanish Abolitionist Society had submitted a plea to the Cortes on September 22, 1872, supported a month later by Puerto Rican deputies, though limited to their island. The government decided to propose the abolition law only for Puerto Rico, alongside granting the island provincial status and separating political and military authority, which did not prevent Gasset y Artime’s resignation—along with Finance Minister Ruiz Gómez in solidarity. Gasset was replaced by Tomás Mosquera, who presented the bill on December 24, 1872, aligning "the celebration of Jesus Christ’s birth, the savior of the oppressed, with the exposition of slave liberation." The measure affected 29,335 slaves, far fewer than in Cuba.

Conservative and anti-abolitionist groups, led by the Hispanic-Overseas Centers, opposed the bill, arguing it endangered Spanish interests in Puerto Rico, as immediately freeing nearly 30,000 plantation slaves—despite owner compensation and freedmen remaining under freedman status for years—would destabilize the island and negatively impact Cuba by encouraging rebels. The Hispanic-Overseas Centers formed a National League, issuing a Manifesto to the nation calling for halting the reforms.

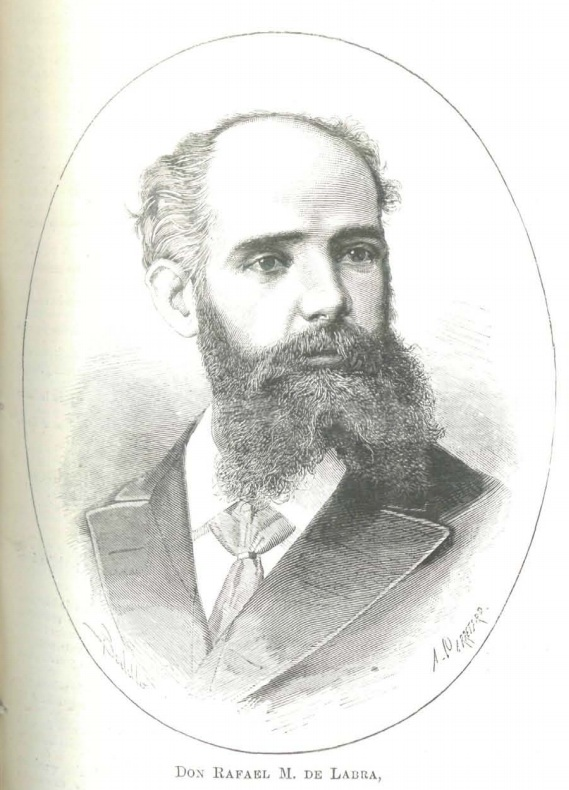
Rafael María de Labra, an active Hispanic-Cuban abolitionist. He ensured the Cortes did not approve the "patronato" for slaves in Puerto Rico, freed by the law of March 22, 1873.

Debate on the Puerto Rico bill began in the Cortes on February 9, 1873, and the National League issued an ultimatum to King Amadeo I to dismiss the government, even if it violated the Constitution. Instead, the king abdicated, driven by multiple reasons, and the First Spanish Republic was proclaimed on February 11. The new republican government under Estanislao Figueras adopted the Puerto Rico bill as "the first symbol of the new regime" and presented it to the National Assembly—the joint meeting of the Congress of Deputies and the Senate from Amadeo’s monarchy—which unanimously approved it on March 22. The proposal to subject freed slaves to a six-year "patronato" under their former owners was rejected, following a motion by Hispanic-Cuban abolitionist Rafael María de Labra, who argued that the "patronato" was a covert way to compensate slave owners. The law was published in Puerto Rico on March 30—its Article 1 stated: "Slavery is abolished forever in the island of Puerto Rico"—freeing 29,182 slaves belonging to about 2,000 owners. Freed slaves were required to contract with their former owners for a minimum of three years.

In the following months, the Republic aimed to abolish slavery in Cuba, but the measure was never approved due to the regime’s instability and short duration—efforts were made by Overseas Ministers Santiago Soler y Pla under Emilio Castelar and Víctor Balaguer under the "Serrano dictatorship." The Sagunto Pronouncement on December 29, 1874, led to the Bourbon Restoration in Spain, with the first government under Antonio Cánovas del Castillo.

== The Restoration (1875–1886): Abolition of Slavery in Cuba ==
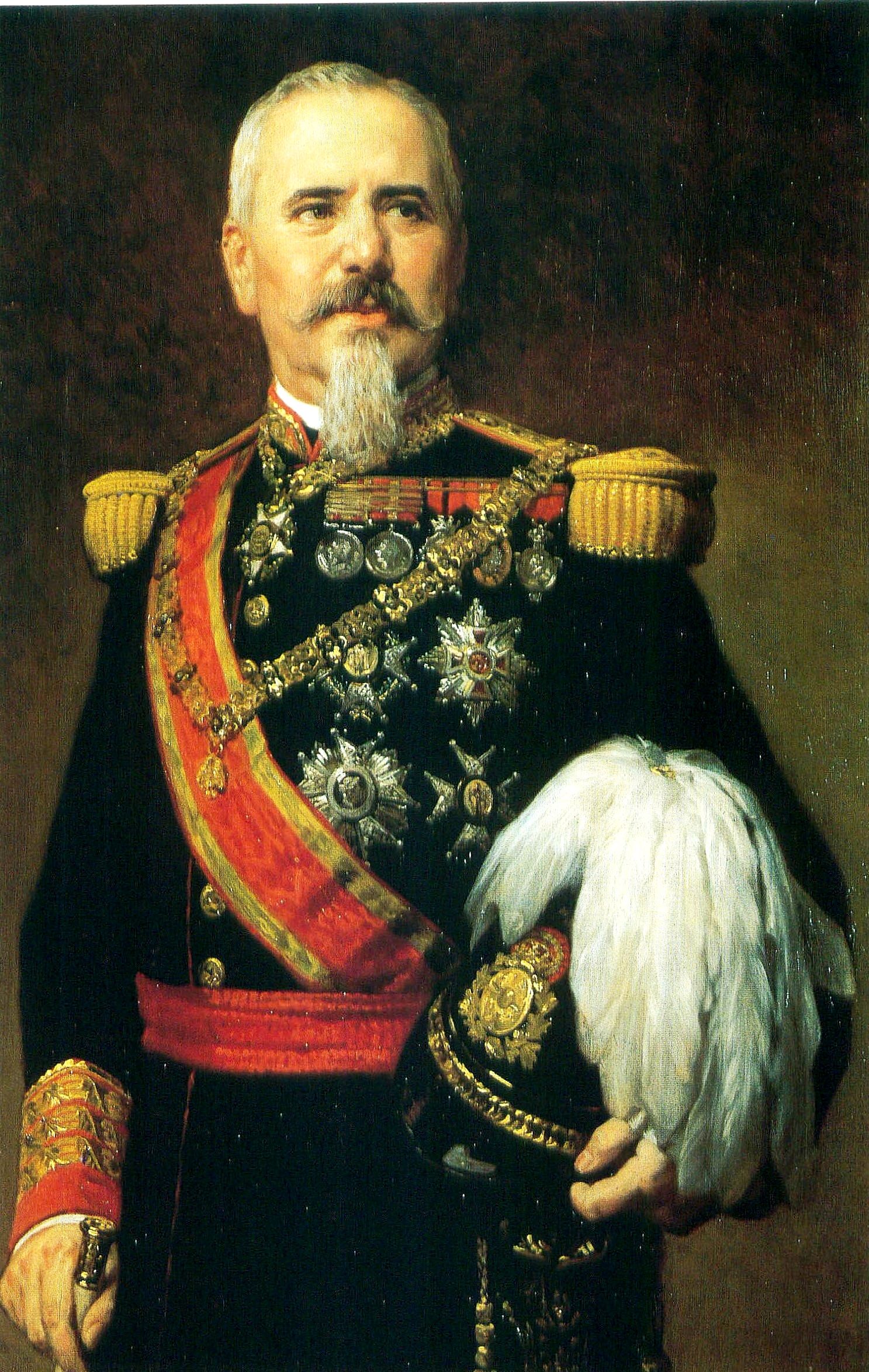
General Arsenio Martínez-Campos. The Pact of Zanjón he negotiated with rebel leaders paved the way for the abolition of slavery in Cuba.

In February 1878, the Pact of Zanjón ended the Ten Years' War. The "capitulations" agreed upon by General Martínez-Campos and Cuban insurgent leaders included recognizing the freedom granted by the rebels to slaves who fought with them. "This provision was difficult to enforce, as even slaves who fought for the royalists, as stipulated by Article 3 of the Moret Law, had not been freed. The issue was complex, as freeing slaves who fought with the insurgents without doing the same for those who fought against them would penalize the slaveholding bourgeoisie that funded the war against the patriots. The only solution was the total abolition of slavery."

The main "capitulation" of the Zanjón agreement granted Cuba "the same political, organic, and administrative conditions as the island of Puerto Rico," implying abolitionism. Many planters and slave owners did not see the "Peace of Zanjón" as the start of a new era, as its supporters claimed, "considering it too much of a concession to the enemy", with one representative calling it "the thousand-times-cursed peace of Zanjón."

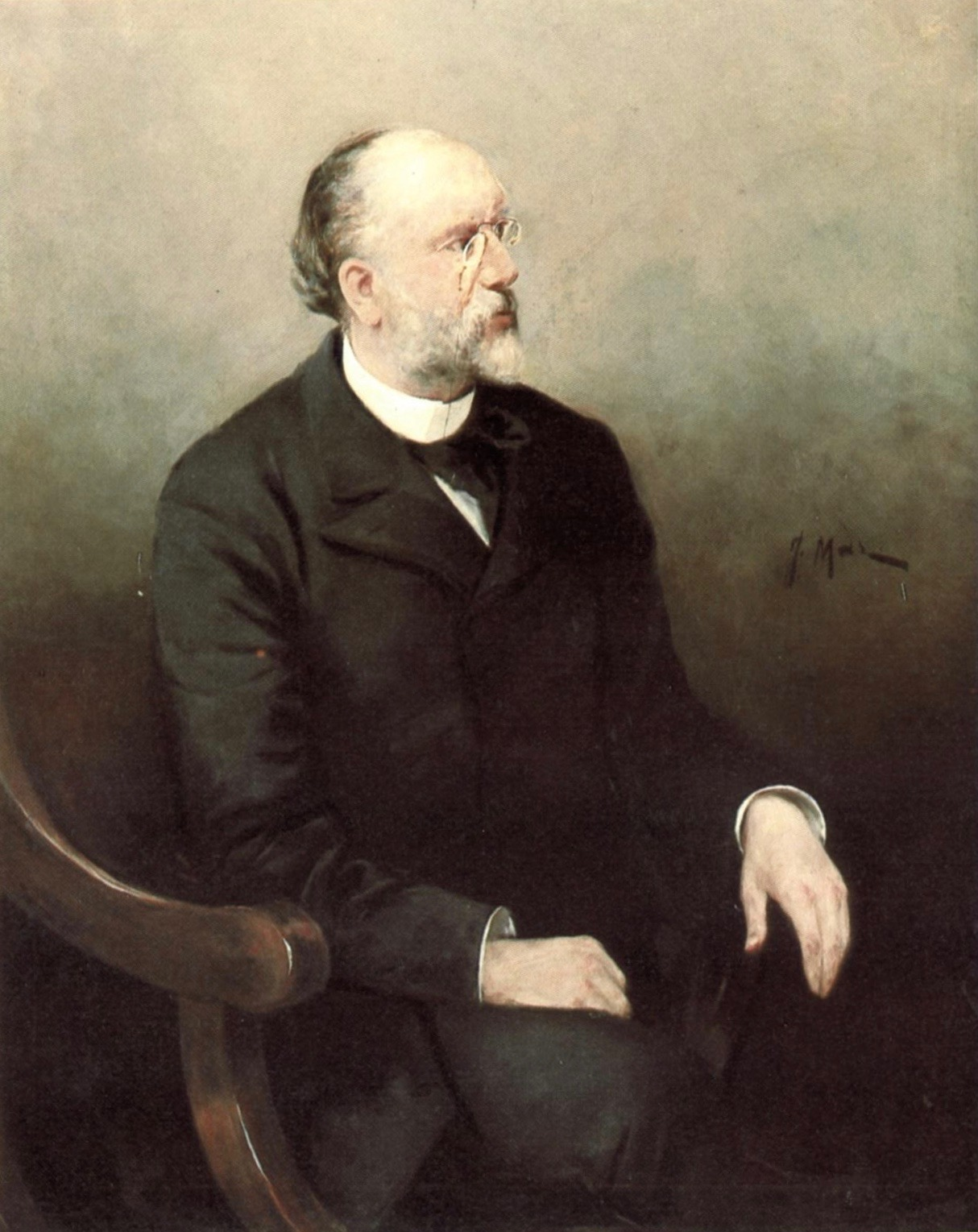
Salvador Albacete, Overseas Minister in Martínez-Campos’ government, drafted the bill to abolish slavery in Cuba, approved with modifications in February 1880 under Antonio Cánovas del Castillo.

General Martínez-Campos himself implemented the Zanjón agreement, as upon returning to Spain in early 1879—convinced that only political and economic reforms could prevent another Cuban insurrection—he was appointed by King Alfonso XII as prime minister due to his prestige as the pacifier of the Great Antille. Antonio Cánovas del Castillo, prime minister during the Zanjón agreement, preferred to "wash his hands" of the treaty, whose clauses he did not fully support.

Fulfilling the commitment, the Martínez-Campos government, specifically Overseas Minister Salvador Albacete, presented a bill to the Cortes to abolish slavery in Cuba—then home to about 200,000 slaves. The bill proposed freeing slaves but with a transitional "patronato" system, allowing former owners to retain rights to their labor for eight years, obligated to pay wages, provide clothing, food, medical care, and primary education for children. Despite this, plantation and sugar mill owners and their political supporters in the peninsula opposed the bill.

The debate was postponed for King Alfonso XII’s second wedding on November 28, but when resumed, disagreements within the government over the abolition bill and the tax and tariff reforms proposed for Cuba by Salvador Albacete forced Martínez-Campos to resign on December 9 to Alfonso XII. The king then tasked Cánovas with forming a new government.

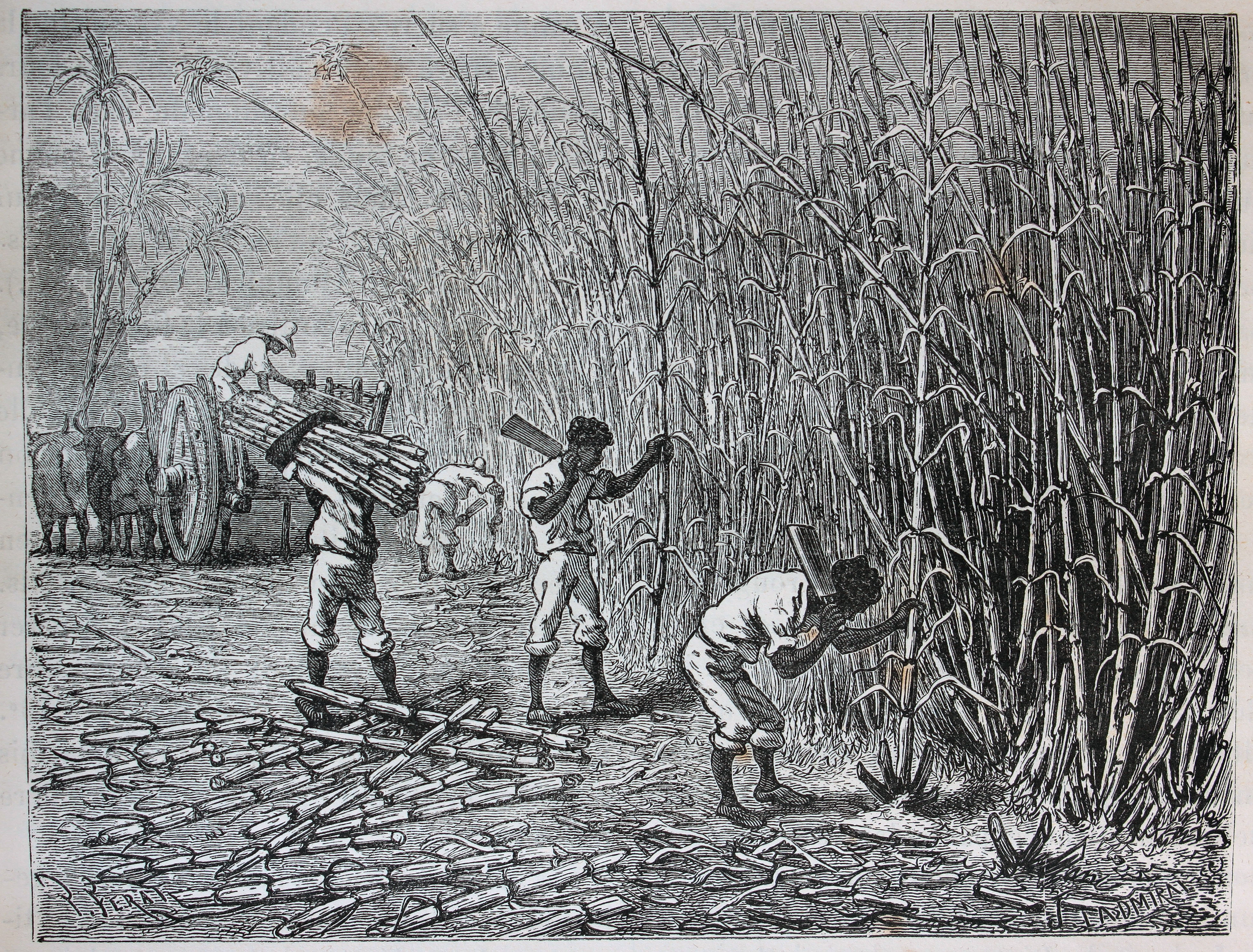
Slaves working on a sugar cane plantation in Cuba.

Aware it could not be withdrawn and despite opposition from Cuban slaveholders of the Union Constitutional Party, Cánovas adopted Martínez-Campos’ bill, reportedly with the king’s support—the Cuban Captain General had urged that abolition be "as broad and liberal as possible for the slave". However, he introduced modifications favoring slave owners. According to Inés Roldán de Montaud, "concessions to slaveholders were significant: patronato extinction by age order, not lottery; reduced stipends for patrocinados under 18; and reinstatement of corporal punishment explicitly removed in Albacete’s bill." José Antonio Piqueras agrees: "Gradual extinction by quarters would be by age, from oldest to youngest, starting in the fifth year. Patrons retained ‘coercive and disciplinary’ powers." Thus, Cánovas secured the bill’s approval on February 13 of the following year, titled "Law for the Suppression of Slavery in Cuba." The slaveholders further ensured that the patronato regulation, issued on May 8, 1880, included greater concessions, such as applying stocks and shackles to "patrocinados" refusing to work, leaving plantations without permission, inciting strikes, or disobeying overseers’ orders. With these changes, the Union Constitutional Party accepted the "patronato" system in August 1880.

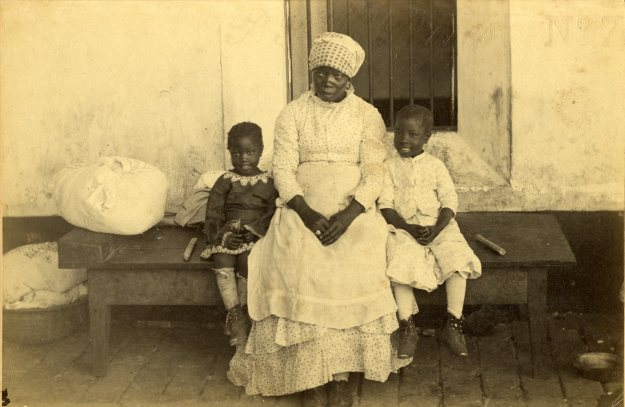
Cuban slaves, likely "patrocinados", in the 1880s.

The Spanish Abolitionist Society was not satisfied with the 1880 law and continued pressing until the Liberal government of Sagasta, succeeding Cánovas’ Conservative government in February 1881, approved in February 1883 the freedom of "patrocinados" not listed in the 1867 and 1871 slave censuses—between 11,000 and 40,000 by various estimates—and in November 1883 abolished the stocks and shackles punishment. Additionally, technical improvements in sugar plantations amid falling global sugar prices made slave/patrocinado labor increasingly unnecessary and unprofitable, to the point that, according to José Antonio Piqueras, "slavery, under the patronato formula, had become residual in Cuban society." This enabled a new Liberal government under Sagasta, formed after the death of King Alfonso XII in November 1885, to advance the end of the "patronato", scheduled for 1888, by two years, as its persistence hindered Spain’s international relations, the only European country still maintaining slavery in one of its domains. Thus, on October 7, 1886, slavery in Spain was abolished, freeing the last 25,000 "patrocinados". In the West, only Brazil remained a slaveholding country, abolishing slavery two years later in 1888.

== See also ==
- Cuban Anti-Slavery Committee formed in the United States in 1872 by African American men
- Slavery in colonial Spanish America
- Sociedad Abolicionista Española

== Bibliography ==
- Díaz Hernández, Magdalena (2016). "El pensamiento de Bartolomé de las Casas sobre la esclavitud de los negros en América" [The thought of Bartolomé de las Casas on the slavery of Black people in America]. Imagen e identidad de Andalucía en la Edad Moderna (in Spanish). Universidad de Almería.
- Galván Rodríguez, Eduardo (2014). La abolición de la esclavitud en España. Debates parlamentarios [The abolition of slavery in Spain. Parliamentary debates] (in Spanish). Madrid: Dykinson. ISBN 978-84-9085-212-5.
- Iglesias Ortega, Luis (2003). "Bartolomé de Las casas, defensor de los negros" [Bartolomé de Las Casas, defender of Black people]. La Aventura de la Historia (58): 50–54.
- Jover, José María (1981). "La época de la Restauración. Panorama político-social, 1875–1902". Revolución burguesa, oligarquía y constitucionalismo (1834–1923) [The Restoration era. Political-social overview, 1875–1902] (in Spanish). Vol. VIII of the History of Spain, directed by Manuel Tuñón de Lara. Barcelona: Labor. pp. 269–406. ISBN 84-335-9428-1.
- Lucena Salmoral, Manuel; Lucena Giraldo, Manuel (2003) [2002]. "Esclavitud" [Slavery]. In Javier Fernández Sebastián and Juan Francisco Fuentes (ed.). Diccionario político y social del siglo XIX español [Political and social dictionary of 19th-century Spain] (in Spanish). Madrid: Alianza Editorial. pp. 275–280. ISBN 84-206-8603-4.
- Martínez de Pisón Cavero, José María (2017). "El debate abolicionista en el primer liberalismo español" [The abolitionist debate in early Spanish liberalism]. Cuadernos electrónicos de filosofía del derecho (in Spanish) (35): 91–113.
- Piqueras, José Antonio (2017) [2012]. La esclavitud en las Españas. Un lazo transatlántico [Slavery in the Spains. A transatlantic bond] (in Spanish) (3rd ed.). Madrid: Los Libros de la Catarata. ISBN 978-84-8319-659-5.
- Roldán de Montaud, Inés (2003). "La política española en Cuba: una década de cambios (1876–1886)" [Spanish policy in Cuba: a decade of changes (1876–1886)]. Ayer (in Spanish) (52). Dossier: ‘The politics in the reign of Alfonso XII’, Carlos Dardé, editor: 175–206.
- Seco Serrano, Carlos (2007). Alfonso XII (in Spanish). Barcelona: Ariel. ISBN 978-84-344-5210-7.
- Vilches, Jorge (2001). Progreso y Libertad. El Partido Progresista en la Revolución Liberal Española [Progress and Freedom. The Progressive Party in the Spanish Liberal Revolution] (in Spanish). Madrid: Alianza Editorial. ISBN 84-206-6768-4.
