= Javier Fuentes =

Javier Fuentes may refer to:

- Javier Paniagua Fuentes, Spanish author and politician
- Javier Fuentes-León, Peruvian film director
