= Julio Vizcarrondo =

Puerto Rican politician

Julio Vizcarrondo Coronado
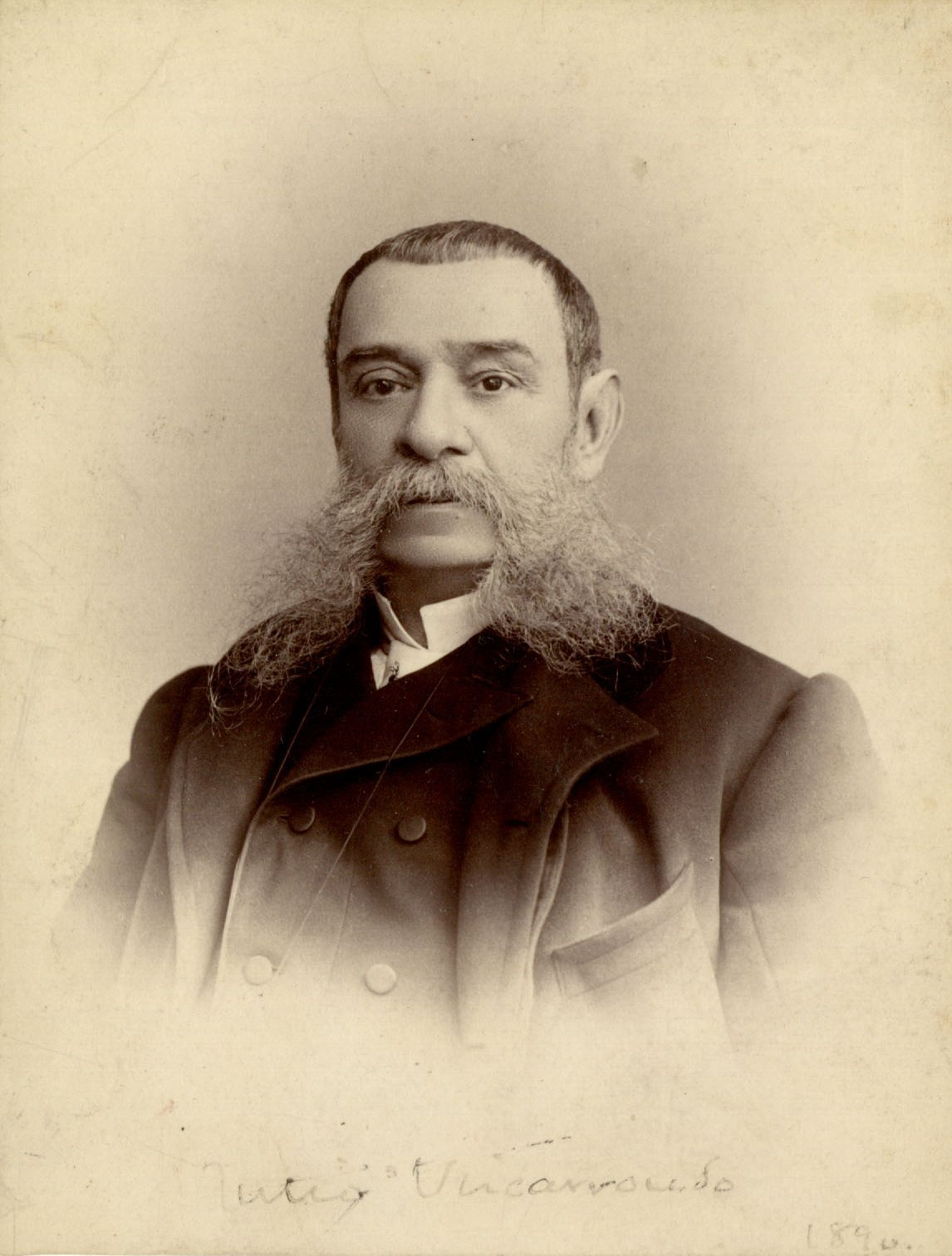
- Julio Vizcarrondo Coronado
- Born: December 9, 1829; San Juan, Puerto Rico
- Died: 1889; Madrid, Spain
- Occupations: Journalist, Political activist

Notes
- Vizcarrondo Coronado was founder of the Protestant movement in the Iberian Peninsula in the 19th century

Julio Vizcarrondo Coronado (December 9, 1829 – 1889) was a Puerto Rican abolitionist, journalist, politician and religious leader. He played an instrumental role in the development and passage of the Moret Law which in 1873 abolished slavery in Puerto Rico. Vizcarrondo was also the founder of the Protestant movement in the Iberian Peninsula in the 19th century.

== Early years ==
Vizcarrondo was born in San Juan, Puerto Rico to Dr. Jose Bonifacio Vizcarrondo y Ortiz de Zarate and María Josefa Coronado y Martínez. His family were the owners of slaves who worked their Hacienda. Vizcarrondo received his primary education in the capital city of Puerto Rico and his secondary education in Madrid, Spain and Paris, France.

== Journalist ==
Upon his return to Puerto Rico, Vizcarrondo began to write for a local newspaper, where he expressed his liberal ideas and his position against slavery. The Spanish government considered his remarks as treacherous, and the appointed governor of the island, Lieutenant General Juan de la Pezuela y Cevallos (1848–1851), ordered his exile to the United States.

=== Exile and return ===
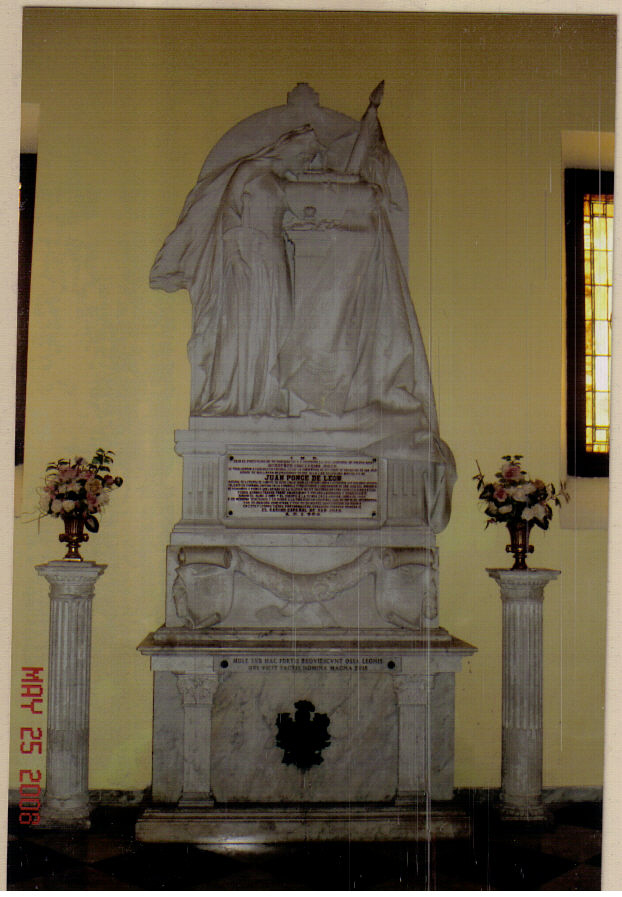
Tomb of Juan Ponce de León

In 1850, Vizcarrondo arrived in New York City and joined the "International Conference of Paris against Slavery" as Secretary of the Permanent Committee of said organization. In New York he met and married Henriette Brewster y Cornell and converted to Protestantism, the faith of his wife. In 1854, Vizcarrondo returned to Puerto Rico and continued writing articles and expressing his ideas. He granted his slaves their freedom and became a defender of the rights of Black slaves in Puerto Rico. He often denounced, in the island's courts, the slave owners who mistreated their slaves, thereby making many enemies. Vizcarrondo also denounced what he felt was the mistreatment of the Puerto Ricans and Puerto Rico in general by the colonial Spanish government.

In 1857, he established the newspaper El Mercurio (The Mercury) and later established the "La Casa de la Caridad de San Ildefonso", an educational institution which provided free education to children of little or no means. The director (principal) of the institution was his wife. In 1863, he was named secretary of the commission in charge of moving the remains of Juan Ponce de León from its resting place in the Church of San José to the Cathedral of San Juan Bautista. Vizcarrondo continued to make enemies because of the liberal ideas which he expressed in his newspaper.

Vizcarrondo published various books on math, history and geography which were used in his school. In 1866, he also wrote a spelling book relying upon ancient methods of learning to read titled El Silabario Puertorriqueño (The Puerto Rican primary textbook) which was declared a textbook and used in the schools of the island. Vizcarrondo published the Elementos de Historia y Geografía de Puerto Rico (The Elements of History and Geography of Puerto Rico) which was made into a textbook.

== In Madrid ==
In 1863, Vizcarrondo moved to Madrid where he joined other Puerto Ricans and Cubans who were also abolitionists. During his stay, Spain suffered the consequences of a cholera plague. Vizcarrondo and his friends founded the "Sociedad de Amigos de los Pobres" (The Society of the Friends of the Poor), an organization which helped to rescue, feed and assist those who were most affected by the cholera plague. He also offered his house as a temporary hospital. The government of Spain awarded him a medal in recognition of his heroic deeds during the cholera epidemic. He later co-founded the "Hospital del Niño Jesús” (Baby Jesus Hospital). The origins of Protestantism in the Iberian Peninsula in the 19th century can be traced to Vizcarrondo. As president of the Central Committee of the Spanish Evangelical Union, he attempted and failed to establish a Protestant church in Madrid. Despite this setback, on January 24, 1869 he was able to convince the mayor of Madrid to grant the members of the Protestant faith permission to hold their religious services in public.

== Political career ==
Vizcarrondo joined the Spanish Republican Party. He helped in the preparation of the Liberal Revolution as Secretary of the revolutionary committee of Madrid. When the government discovered his role, he was exiled to France. He returned to Spain shortly after the revolution triumphed. Once again he was given a position in the revolutionary committee of Madrid, and he helped reorganize the Sociedad Abolicionista (Abolitionist Society). In 1873, Vizcarrondo – together with Ramon Baldorioty de Castro, Luis Padial and the Minister of Overseas Affairs, Segismundo Moret – presented a proposal for the abolition of slavery in Puerto Rico and Cuba. On March 22, 1873, the Spanish Government approved the proposal which became known as the Moret Law.

== Later years and legacy ==
On May 1, 1880, Vizcarrondo and Rafael María de Labra became the founders of the Sociedad Nacional Democrática (National Democratic Society), a political party whose main goal was to obtain more autonomy for both Puerto Rico and Cuba. In 1886, he was elected and served as a representative from the district of Ponce to the Cortes in Madrid, a post he held until his death in 1889. At the Spanish Parliament, Vizcarrondo recommended an autonomy modeled after the type that Canada had at that moment. In 1887, he participated in a massive campaign directed against the Spanish appointed governor of Puerto Rico, Romualdo Palacio González, which resulted in the governor's replacement. Julio Vizcarrondo Coronado died in 1889, in Madrid.

The government of Puerto Rico honored Vizcarrondo's memory by naming schools in the towns of Carolina and Cayey after him.

== See also ==
- List of Puerto Ricans
