= Javier Paniagua Fuentes =

Spanish author and politician

Javier Paniagua Fuentes (born 1946 in Ceuta, Spain) is a Spanish writer and politician for the Spanish Socialist Workers' Party (PSOE).

== Career ==
After qualifying in philosophy, Paniagua received a doctorate in history with a thesis on Spanish anarchism. He is a teacher of Social History and Political thought at UNED (Spain). His early political activity was with the Spanish Communist organisation (Bandera Roja.) However in 1976 he joined the Socialist Party of the Valencian Country (PSPV) and in 1978 joined the PSOE. He was Director General of Secondary Education in the Valencian regional administration from 1983-1986. At the 1986 General Election he was elected to the Spanish Congress of Deputies representing Valencia Province and was re-elected at the 1989 Election. However, for the 1993 Election he was placed seventh on the PSOE list and with the PSOE losing two of their eight seats, he lost his seat. As first substitute, he returned to the Congress one year later on 10 June 1994, replacing Vicente Albero. He was re-elected in 1996 but did not stand in 2000.

== Published works ==
- España Siglo XX : 1931-1939 ISBN 978-84-207-3364-7
- Anarquistas y socialistas (1989)

== Works ==
- Las ideas económicas del anarquismo y los movimientos libertarios en España: un esquema. (1999) (junto con Salvador Almenar Palau)
- La UNED en la encrucijada de los próximos años (1993) (junto con Montserrat Blanco Bahamonde)
- "Trayectoria del sindicalismo español", Historia 16 (1991)
- "Las reacciones ante el bilingüismo: una perspectiva histórica", Revista de Educación (1981)
- Contribución al estudio del movimiento huelguístico del País Valenciano: 1905-1935 (1974) (junto con Joaquim Prats Cuevas)
- La sociedad libertaria (1982)
- La larga marcha hacia la anarquía (2008)
- Breve historia del socialismo y comunismo (2011)
- Breve historia del Anarquismo (2012)
- Anarquistas y Socialistas (1989)
- La Transición democrática. De la dictadura a la democracia en España (1973-1986) (2009)
- Edición e introducción a Discursos Parlamentarios de Manuel Azaña (1992)
- Diccionario biográfico de políticos valencianos, 1810-2006 (con JA. Piqueras) (2006)
- La España democrática volumen 20 (dirigida por John Lynch) (2007)
- "Republicans, Socialist and Anarchists" in A Social History of Spanish Labour (2007)
