= Sociedad Abolicionista Española =

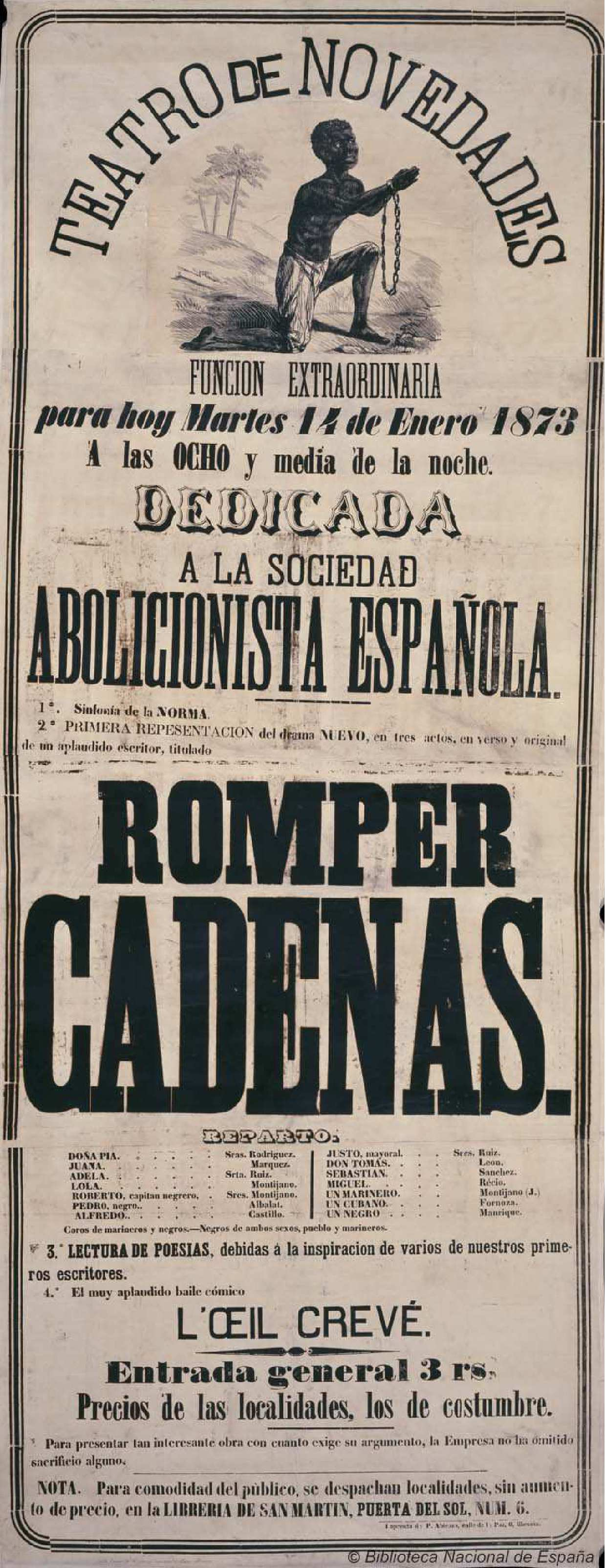
Romper cadenas-BNE

Sociedad Abolicionista Española (English: 'Spanish Abolitionist Society') was an abolitionist organization founded in Spain 7 December 1864. The purpose was the campaign for the abolition of slavery in the Spanish colonial empire, specifically in the Spanish Antilles, Cuba and Puerto Rico.

== History ==
The Sociedad Abolicionista Española was founded by Julio Vizcarrondo, a former slave owner who had manumitted his slaves. Local sections of the organization was established in a number of cities in Spain. The members of the organization was primarily composed by radical, progressive and liberal male politicians or their sympathizers.

The purpose of the organization was achieved in December 1888.

== See also ==
- Society of the Friends of the Blacks founded in Paris in 1788
- Belgian Anti-Slavery Society founded in 1888
- Brazilian Anti-Slavery Society founded in 1880
- Cuban Anti-Slavery Committee formed in the United States in 1872 by African American men and women
