= Francisco de Arango y Parreño =

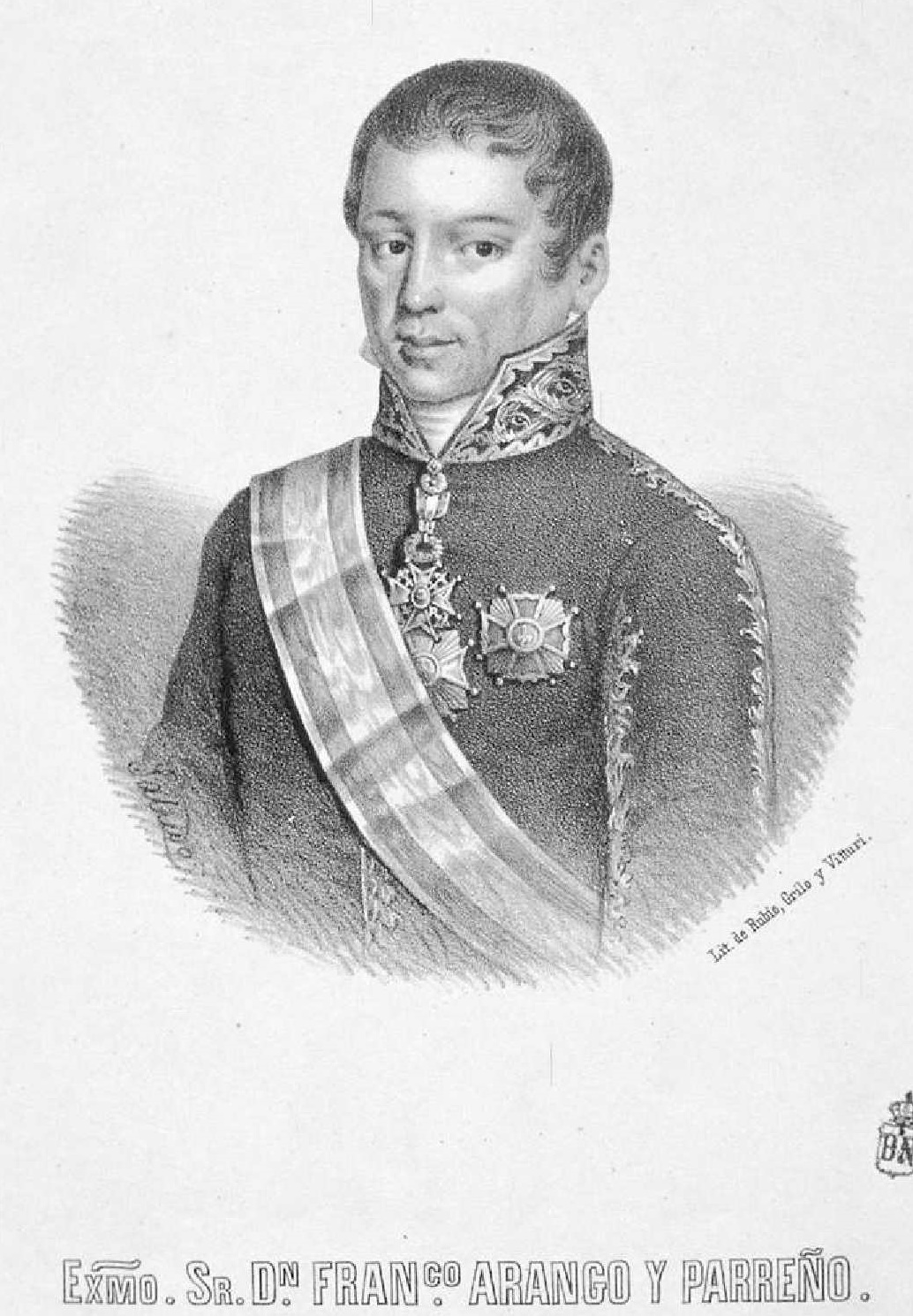
- Portrait by Isidoro Salcedo y Echevarría. Lithograph in Rubio, Grilo y Vituri Biblioteca Nacional de España.
- Born: 22 May 1765; Havana, Captaincy General of Cuba, Spanish Empire
- Died: 21 March 1837 (aged 71); Havana, Captaincy General of Cuba, Spanish Empire
- Education: Universidad de La Habana
- Occupations: Lawyer, writer

Francisco de Arango y Parreño (1765–1837) was a Cuban planter and intellectual. He helped to oversee colonial Cuba's transformation into a major sugar and coffee producer in the last decades of the eighteenth century and the first decades of the nineteenth century.

== Early life ==
Arango y Parreño was born into a bourgeois Criollo Cuban family on May 22, 1765, in Havana, Cuba. He studied at the Real Colegio Seminario de San Carlos y San Ambrosio. Later, in the 1780s, he studied at the University of San Jeronimo. In 1787, he traveled to Madrid, where he continued his legal studies. By 1789, he had obtained a law degree.

== Career ==
The outbreak of the French Revolution and the subsequent Haitian Revolution (1791–1804) opened new possibilities for Cuban planters. In the first half of the eighteenth century, Cuba's agriculture was fairly basic. The economy centered on ranching and small tobacco farms. A series of events transformed Cuba into a major plantation colony during the second half of the eighteenth century.

Britain occupied Havana in the 1760s and African slaves during their relatively short occupation; at the time, Britain was the biggest slave-trading power in the region. Soon after the occupation ended, the Bourbon Spanish monarchy instituted reforms that gave Cuba more access to imported African slaves and foreign commerce. The Haitian Revolution destroyed what had been the world's largest sugar and coffee producer in the 1790s. This pushed sugar and coffee prices up significantly.

Refugees from Saint-Domingue and Haiti also fled to Cuba, bringing slaves and experience in the sugar and coffee industries with them. Some feared that the introduction of large numbers of enslaved Africans might lead to a revolution like the one that occurred in Saint-Domingue and Haiti. Arango y Parreno, however, argued that a slave rebellion like the one in Saint-Domingue would not occur in Cuba because Spanish slave laws were more enlightened than those of the French and British.

Against this backdrop, Cuban planters exploited the opportunity to develop their island as a major agricultural. In 1793, for example, Arango y Parreño predicted that Cuban planters were about to enjoy a period of prosperity. In 1795, Arango y Parreño and Ignacio Montalvo y Ambulodi, Count of Casa-Montalvo, traveled to England, Portugal, Barbados, and Jamaica to collect information that could help Cuba establish its sugar industry.

Arango y Parreno noted that the English and Portuguese dominated the transatlantic slave trade because they had trading posts on the African coast.

While visiting England, he noted its sugar refineries. British Caribbean sugar producers exported unrefined brown sugar (muscovado) to England, where the sugar was refined. Arango y Parreno believed that Cuba should refine its sugar on the island and sent factory models back to Cuba. The resulting factories gave Cuban sugar planters a major competitive advantage.

When he visited Barbados and Jamaica, Arango y Parreño made detailed observations about their sugarcane cultivation, sugar production and rum production. After his voyage, other Cuban planters made similar fact-finding tours.

Arango y Parreño played an important role in convincing Cuban planters to adopt the latest innovations in the sugar industry, new sugarcane varieties like Otaheite (Tahitian) cane, and processing that used steam, water, and wind power. Cuba's rise as a major slave-based sugar producer accompanied growing international agitation for the abolition of slavery. Arango y Parreño argued that slavery would eventually have to be abolished, but that emancipation should be left in the hands of Cuban colonists rather than imperial authorities in Spain.

In the 1790s, Arango y Parreño helped to pioneer a transatlantic slave trade to Cuba, operated by Cuban and Spanish merchants from the island of Fernando Po off the coast of West Africa. In the 1820s Arango y Parreño became an opponent of the slave trade. This change of position may have reflected Cuban planters' fears of growing numbers of African slaves and their distrust of slave traders who had close ties to Spanish colonial officials. He died on March 21, 1837.

== Sources ==
- Blackburn, Robin (1990). "The Overthrow of Colonial Slavery, 1776-1848". Labour / Le Travail. 26: 251. doi:10.2307/25143492. ISSN 0700-3862.
- Knight, Franklin (1993). "The Transformation of Cuban Agriculture 1763-1838"". In Shepherd, Verene; Beckles, Hilary (eds.). Caribbean slave society and economy : a student reader. New Press. pp. 69–79. ISBN 1-56584-086-0. OCLC 214970577.
- Palmié, Stephan; Scarano, Francisco A. (2011). The Caribbean. University of Chicago Press. ISBN 978-0-226-64508-7.
- Caines, Clement (1801). Letters on the Cultivation of the Otaheite Cane; the manufacture of sugar and rum, the saving of melasses, the care and preservation of stock, etc. Messrs. Robinson.
