= José Antonio Piqueras =

Spanish historian

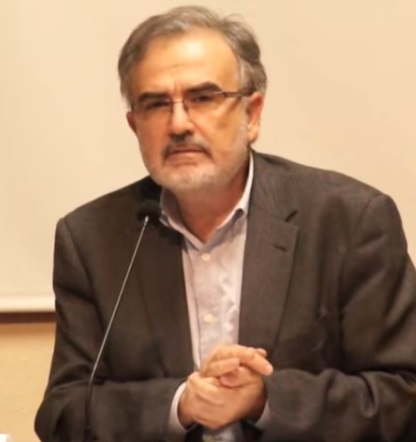
- Born: 1955 (age 70–71); Enguera, Valencia, Spain

Academic background
- Education: University of Valencia
- Thesis: Orígenes sociales de la Restauración (1990)

Academic work
- Discipline: history
- Institutions: Jaume I University
- Main interests: labour movement; slavery; 19-century Spain; history of Cuba and the Antilles

José Antonio Piqueras Arenas (born 1955) is a Spanish historian. Professor of Contemporary History of the Jaume I University (UJI), his research lines focus on the study of social relations and political attitudes. Among other topics, his academic production has dealt with the history of the labour movement, slavery, 19th-century Spanish history, and the history of Cuba and the Antilles.

== Biography ==
Born in 1955 in Enguera, Valencia, he earned a PhD from the University of Valencia (UV) reading a dissertation titled Orígenes sociales de la Restauración in 1990. He was appointed as senior lecturer at the UJI in 1993, and as professor in the area of Contemporary History in 1998. He is the co-editor of Historia Social, a leading Spanish-language journal in the field of social history.

He was elected as corresponding member of the Academy of History of Cuba in 2014.

== Works ==
- — (1992). La revolución democrática (1868-1874), cuestión social, colonialismo y grupos de presión. Madrid: Ministerio de Trabajo y Seguridad Social.
- — (2003). Cuba, emporio y colonia. La disputa de un mercado interferido (1878-1895). Madrid: FCE.
- — (2006). Persiguiendo el porvenir. La identidad histórica del socialismo valenciano 1870-1976. Alzira: Editorial Algar.
- — (2008). Cánovas y la derecha española. Del magnicidio a los neocon. Barcelona: Ediciones Península.
- — (2010). Bicentenarios de libertad: La fragua de la política en España y las Américas. Barcelona: Ediciones Península.
- — (2011). La esclavitud en las Españas. Un lazo trasatlántico. Madrid: Catarata.
- — (2014). El federalismo. La libertad protegida, la convivencia pactada. Madrid: Alianza.
- — (2016). La era Hobsbawm en historia social. Mexico D.F.: El Colegio de México.
