= Rafael María de Labra =

Spanish politician and writer (1840–1918)

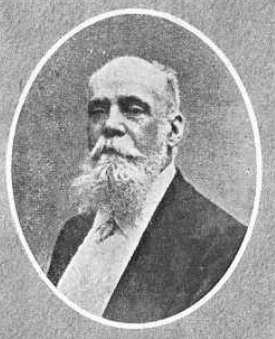
- Portrait circa 1911

Personal details
- Born: 7 September 1840 Havana
- Died: 16 April 1918 (aged 77) Madrid
- Occupation: Politician, writer, educator, journalist, lecturer, lawyer

Rafael María de Labra y Cadrana (7 September 1840 – 16 April 1918) was a Spanish krausist educator, activist, lawyer, lecturer, Republican politician and author. He served two times as Rector of the Institución Libre de Enseñanza. A noted abolitionist, he was a key figure in the campaign for the abolition of slavery in Puerto Rico and Cuba.

== Biography ==
Born in Havana (both 7 September 1840 and 1841 have been reported as birth date), son to Rafaela González Cadrana (a Cuban-Asturian) and Ramón María de Labra (a Liberal army officer from Asturias, defender of the 1812 Constitution who had been exiled during the Ominous Decade, destined to Cuba in 1836).

Rafael moved to Mainland Spain in 1849 with his family, establishing early in Madrid after briefly passing by Almería and Cádiz. A teenage Labra joined the Ateneo de Madrid as member on 15 November 1857. He was the founder (or editor) of a number of newspapers such as La Tribuna, El Correo de España or El Correo de Ultramar.

He took studies at the Central University of Madrid, where he became a disciple of Moreno Nieto, Benito Gutiérrez Fernández and Sanz del Río; he earned a licentiate degree in Philosophy and Letters in 1858, Administrative Law (1862) and Civil and Canon Law (1862).

His "dangerous or condemnable ideas" on colonial policies prevented him from becoming a university professor. A member of the Spanish Abolitionist Society, Labra became its president in 1869.

He became a member of the Congress of Deputies after the 1871 election, in representation of the district of Infiesto (Asturias). He would earn again a seat as member of the Lower House in representation of Sabana Grande (Puerto Rico; 1872; 1874); Havana (1879) and Santa Clara (Cuba; 1885).

He was also a member of the Spanish Senate, elected in representation of the University of Havana and in representation of the Sociedad Económica de Amigos del País de León.

Labra's first tenure as president of the Institución Libre de Enseñanza (ILE) lasted from 1881 to 1882. He returned to the presidency of the ILE in 1885, remaining at the post until his death. He was elected to the presidency of the government board of the Ateneo de Madrid in February 1913, serving in that capacity until his death.

He died on 16 April 1918, in Madrid.

== Views ==
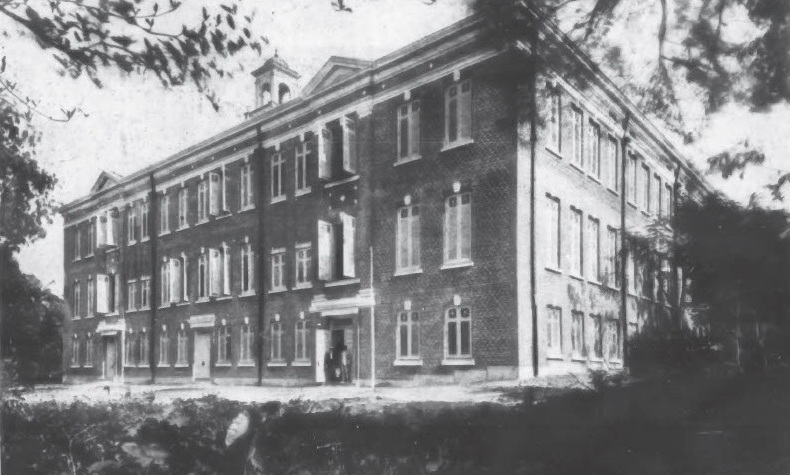
School in San Juan, Puerto Rico named after Labra

Labra, who along his parliamentary history espoused autonomist stances vis-à-vis the Cuban question, remarked in 1898 that "he was not an advocate of the independence of our Antilles", always defending the compatibility of autonomy of the colonies and Spanish national integrity. A convinced Republican, he adhered to the Republican-Evolutionist line during the First Spanish Republic. According to the Count of Romanones, if Labra had reneged on his republican faith, he would have hold top offices in Spanish politics (of the Restoration), being reportedly asked several times to join the government.

Described as a "Revolutionary Liberal", he was a key campaigner for the abolition of slavery in Cuba and Puerto Rico. He was also a pacifist.

Adhered to Krausist social organicism, he defended the instruction and education of the people as a mean to bridge the gap between social classes and as vehicle for the formation of a strong public opinion, thus facilitating the participation of people in politics.

Educational offices
Preceded by	Rector of the Institución Libre de Enseñanza; 1881–1882	Succeeded by
Preceded by	Rector of the Institución Libre de Enseñanza; 1885–1918	Succeeded by
Cultural offices
Preceded by Segismundo Moret	President of the Ateneo de Madrid; 1913–1918	Succeeded by Ramón Menéndez Pidal
