= List of women who led a revolt or rebellion =

This is a list of women who led a revolt or rebellion. A revolt is an organized attempt to overthrow an existing body of state authority through a rebellion, or uprising.

== Armed conflict ==
=== Before 1000 AD ===
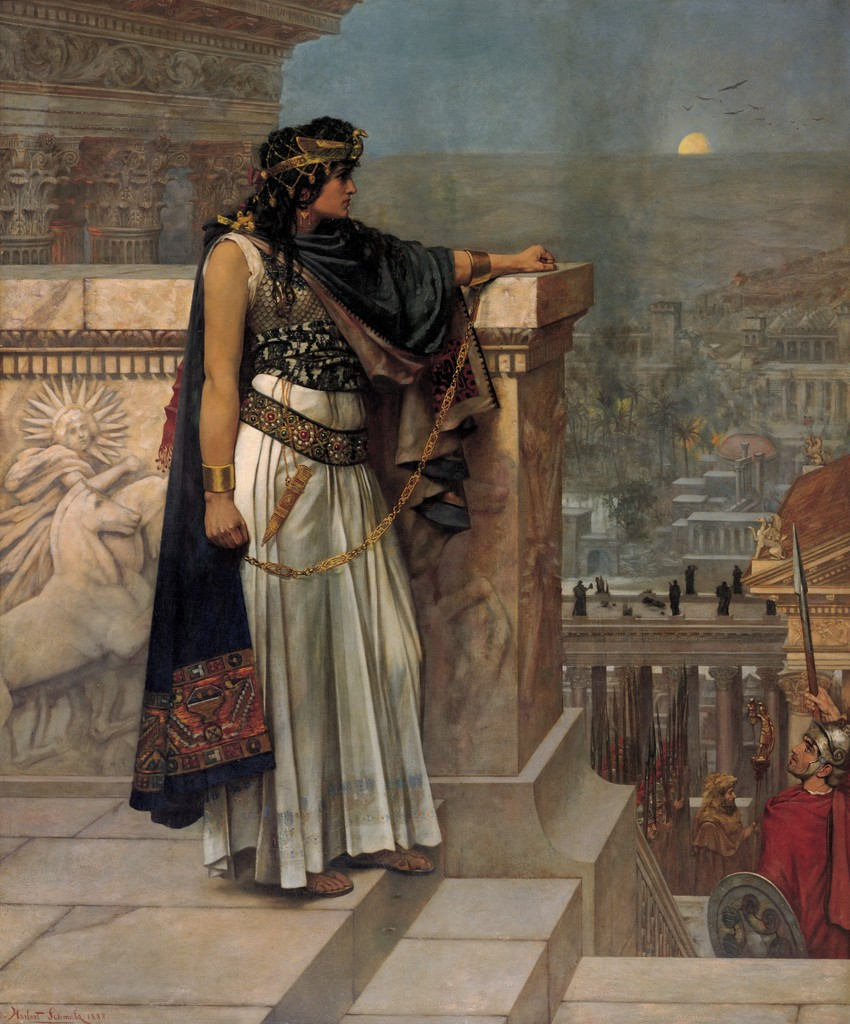
Zenobia's Last Look on Palmyra by Herbert Schmalz, 1888

- In 671–670 BC, the oracle of Nusku, a former slave-girl, initiated a rebellion against the Assyrian king Esarhaddon in favor of the official Sasi and played a central role in the ensuing conspiracy.
- In 280 BC, Chelidonis, a Spartan princess, orchestrated provisioning the warriors on the wall during the Siege of Sparta. She wore a noose around her neck to show her husband Cleonymus that she would not be taken alive.
- In the 9th century BC, according to the legendary history of Britain, Queen Gwendolen gathered an army and fought her ex-husband, Locrinus, in a civil war for the throne of Britain. She defeated him and became the monarch.
- In 131 BC, Cleopatra II of Egypt led a rebellion against Ptolemy VIII Physcon and drove him and Cleopatra III out of Egypt.
- In 42 BC, Fulvia, wife of Mark Antony, organized an uprising against Augustus.
- In 14, Mother Lü led a peasant rebellion against Wang Mang of the Western Han Dynasty.
- In 40, the Trưng Sisters successfully rebelled against the Chinese Han-Dynasty rule, and are regarded as national heroines of Vietnam.
- In 60–61, Boudica, a Celtic chieftain in Britain, led a massive uprising against the occupying Roman forces. The Romans attempted to raise the morale of their troops by informing them that her army contained more women than men.
- In 69–70, Veleda of the Germanic Bructeri tribe wielded a great deal of influence in the Batavian rebellion. She was acknowledged as a strategic leader, a priestess, a prophet, and as a living deity.
- In 270, Zenobia, Syrian queen of the Palmyrene Empire led a revolt against the Roman Empire, Her forces took control of Roman Egypt, Arabia, and parts of Asia Minor.
- In 378, Queen Mavia led a rebellion against the Roman army and defeated them repeatedly. The Romans finally negotiated a truce with her on her conditions.
- In the 7th century, the warrior queen and religious leader Dihya led Berber resistance against the Muslim conquest of the Maghreb.
- In the late-10th century: Judith rebels against the Axumite Dynasty in Ethiopia.

=== 1000 – 1899 ===
- In 1381, Johanna Ferrour was among the chief leaders of the Kentish rebels during the Peasants' Revolt in England. She personally commanded the rebels that burned the Savoy Palace and stormed the Tower of London, and she ordered the execution of Archbishop Simon Sudbury and Robert Hales.
- In 1420, Tang Sai'er led an army in the White Lotus revolt against the Ming dynasty in China.
- In c. 1538-1542, Juliana, a Guaraní woman of early-colonial Paraguay, killed a Spanish colonist (her husband or master), and urged the other enslaved indigenous women to do the same; ending executed.
- In 1539, Gaitana of the Paez led the indigenous people of northern Cauca, Colombia in armed resistance against colonization by the Spanish. Her monument sculpted by Rodrigo Arenas stands in Neiva, the capital of Huila in Colombia.
- In 1577, Apacuana of the Quiriquire people of Venezuela led an uprising against Spanish colonization, ending executed.
- In 1630, Nzinga of Ndongo and Matamba from the Kingdom of Matamba led a series of revolts against the Portuguese. She aligned with the Dutch Republic, forming the first African-European alliance against another European aggressor.
- In 1716, Maria leads a slave rebellion on Dutch Curaçao.
- In 1720–1739, Granny Nanny, a spiritual leader of the Maroons of Jamaica, leads them to victory in the First Maroon War.
- In 1748, Marretje Arents leads the Pachtersoproer.
- In 1760-1790, Rani Velu Nachiyar (Tamil: இராணி வேலு நாச்சியார்) was an 18th-century Indian queen from Sivagangai, Tamil Nadu. Rani Velu Nachiyar was the first queen to fight against the East India Company in India.
- In 1763, Gabriela Silang led a revolution against the Spanish to establish an independent Ilocos, which was started by her husband, Diego Silang in after her husband was assassinated in 1763.
- In 1778, Baltazara Chuiza leads a rebellion against the Spanish in Ecuador.
- In 1780, Huillac Ñusca of the Kolla tribe rebels against the Spanish in Chile.
- In 1781, Manuela Beltrán, a Neogranadine (now Colombia) peasant leads revolt against the Spanish Government and sparks the Revolt of the Comuneros.
- In 1781, Gregoria Apaza, an Aymara woman, leads an uprising against the Spanish in Bolivia.
- In 1782, Bartolina Sisa, an Aymara woman who led an indigenous uprising against the Spanish in Bolivia, is captured and executed.
- On October 25, 1785, Toypurina, a Tongva medicine woman rebels against the Spanish, leading an attack against Mission San Gabriel Arcángel.
- In 1796-1798, Wang Cong'er and Wang Nangxian are leaders and commanders of the White Lotus rebellion in China.
- In 1803, Lorenza Avemanay leads a revolt against Spanish occupation in Ecuador.
- In 1819 María Antonia Santos Plata, a Neogranadine (now Colombia) peasant, galvanized, organized, and led the rebel guerrillas in the Province of Socorro against the invading Spanish troops during the Reconquista of the New Granada; she was ultimately captured, tried, and found guilty of lese-majesty and high treason, sentenced and ultimately put to death by firing squad.
- In 1821, Laskarina Bouboulina, was a Greek naval commander who led her own troops during the Greek War of Independence until the fall of the fort on November 13, 1822. Posthumously, she became an Admiral of the Imperial Russian Navy.
- In 1824, Kittur Chennamma led an armed rebellion against the rule of the East India Company in response to the Doctrine of lapse. The rebellion ended with her death. Chennamma's primary grievance was the kappa tax.
- In 1831, Countess Emilia Plater creates her own group to fight in the Polish November Uprising. She becomes commanding officer of a company of infantry in the rank of captain.
- In 1843-1844, enslaved Lucumí women Carlota and Ferminia, led the slave rebellion of Year of the Lash on Cuba.
- In 1857–1858, Rani Lakshmibai of Jhansi was one of the leaders of the Indian Rebellion of 1857. Begum Hazrat Mahal also led a band of her supporters in support of Laskhimbai during the revolt.
- In 1868, Ana Betancourt helped organize the fight for Cuban independence during the Ten Years' War and used it as an opportunity to advocate for women's rights.
- In 1896, Shona spiritual leader Nehanda Nyakasikana participated in the Matabele wars.

=== 1900 onward ===
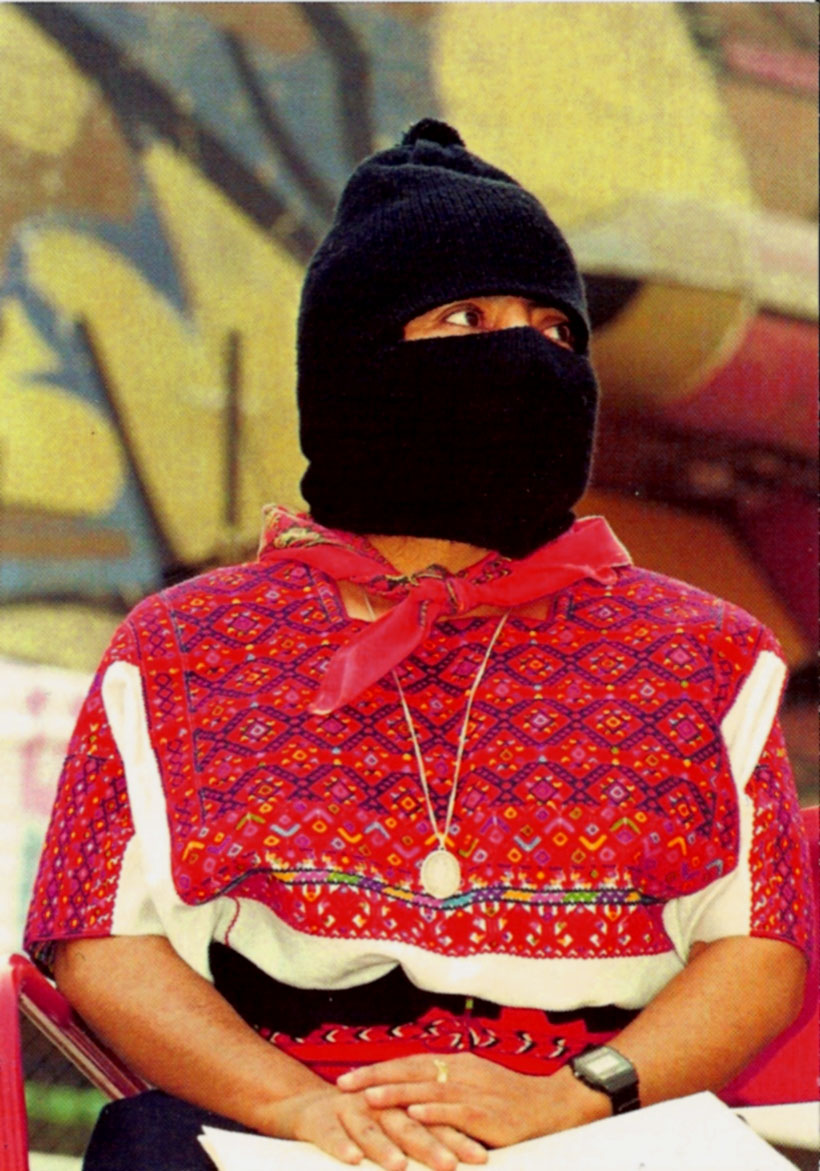
Comandanta Ramona

- In 1900, Yaa Asantewaa leads the Ashanti during the War of the Golden Stool.
- In 1919, Rosa Luxemburg leads the Spartacus League in rebellion against the Council of the People's Deputies in power in Germany after the November Revolution of 1918 in Germany.
- In 1950, Blanca Canales leads the Jayuya Uprising in Puerto Rico against the U.S. government. After leading rebel forces, she was arrested for the murder of a police officer and the wounding of three others.
- In 1958, Ani Pachen was a Tibetan Buddhist nun who led a guerrilla rebellion of 600 fighters on horseback against Communist Chinese tanks.
- In 1986-1987, Alice Auma leads a rebellion against Ugandan government forces.
- On January 1, 1994, Comandante Ramona commanded the occupation of the city of San Cristóbal de las Casas in an uprising of the Zapatista Army of National Liberation.

== Non-violent revolutions and rebellions ==
- Oct. 5, 1789, a young woman struck a marching drum and led The Women's March on Versailles, in a revolt against King Louis XVI, storming the palace and signaling the French Revolution.
- In 1947, Chief Funmilayo Ransome-Kuti led the Abeokuta Women's Union in a revolt that resulted in the abdication of the Egba High King Oba Ademola II.
- In 1986, Corazon Aquino led the People Power Revolution that toppled Ferdinand Marcos.
- In 2003, African peace activists Leymah Gbowee and Comfort Freeman organized Women of Liberia Mass Action for Peace and led a revolt against violence by seizing a building and blockading the men inside. Their actions brought an end to the Second Liberian Civil War, which led to the election of Ellen Johnson Sirleaf in Liberia, the first African nation with a female president.
- In 2004, Yulia Tymoshenko formed the Yulia Tymoshenko Bloc as the leader of Ukrainian opposition. Her leadership galvanized the crowds during the Orange Revolution in Ukraine.
- In 2011, twenty-six-year-old Asmaa Mahfouz was instrumental in initiating the protests that began the uprising in Cairo and started the 2011 Egyptian revolution. She urged the Egyptian people to join her in a protest on January 25 in Tahrir Square to bring down Mubarak's regime. She used video blogging and social media that went viral and urged people not to be afraid.
- In 2011, Aya Virginie Toure organized over 40,000 women in numerous peaceful protests that turned violent in a revolution against Laurent Gbagbo in Côte d'Ivoire.

== See also ==
- Woman warrior
- List of women warriors in folklore
- Women in the military by country
- List of uprisings led by women
