= Salvador José de Muro, 2nd Marquis of Someruelos =

Spanish military officer

The Most Excellent The Marquis of Someruelos (El Marqués de Someruelos)
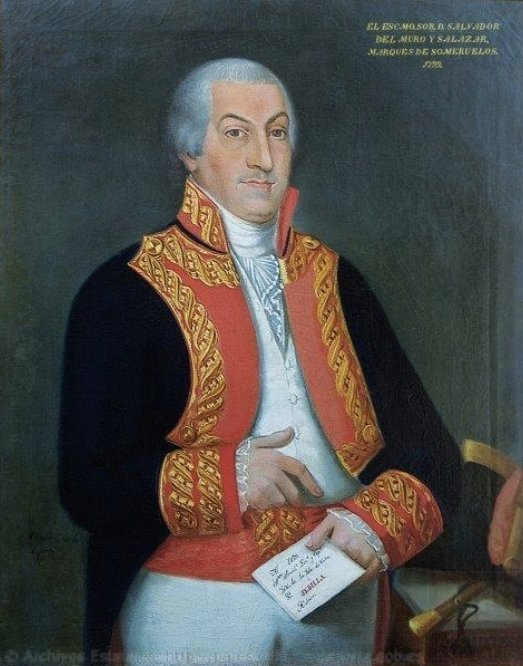

Captain General and Governor of Cuba
- In office 13 May 1799 – 14 April 1812
- Monarchs: Charles IV, Joseph I
- Preceded by: Juan Procopio Bassecourt y Bryas Count of Santa Clara
- Succeeded by: Juan Ruiz de Apodaca

Personal details
- Born: 10 June 1755 Madrid, Spain
- Died: 12 December 1813 (aged 58) Madrid, Spain

Military service
- Battles/wars: War of the Pyrenees

Salvador José de Muro y Salazar, 2nd Marquis of Someruelos, in Spanish: Marqués de Someruelos, (Madrid, 6 October 1755 – 12 December 1813), was a Spanish military officer who served as a lieutenant general of infantry and a field marshal in the Spanish Army, as captain general of Cuba and governor of Havana, and as president of the Real Audiencia of Puerto Príncipe.

Someruelos worked to continue the progressive policies of the former captain general of Cuba, Luis de Las Casas. He supported the introduction in 1803 of a smallpox vaccination program, and promoted public works such as the building of a theatre to encourage the arts, and of the Espada cemetery to improve sanitation. He encouraged social and cultural improvements in the country, and in 1800 and 1804 he was visited by the scientists Alexander von Humboldt and Aimé Bonpland.

Governor Someruelos, mindful of his duty to defend the Spanish colonies in the region of the Gulf of Mexico, rejected overtures by an expansionist United States to begin diplomatic negotiations when, during the height of the economic crisis in Cuba caused by the embargo of 1807, Thomas Jefferson sent Gen. James Wilkinson as an envoy to the Spanish authorities. Someruelos refused to meet him when he finally reached Havana in March 1809.

Although he was appointed to his office by the Spanish Crown, Someruelos took the side of the criollo planters in Cuban politics, whose interests were often opposed to those of the administrative authorities in Metropolitan Spain. He brutally suppressed revolts by enslaved blacks on the island, and in 1812 ordered the hanging of the political activist José Antonio Aponte and fellow conspirators, as well as the public display of their severed heads.

== Early life ==
Someruelos was born in Madrid on 6 October 1755, the son of Pedro Salvador de Muro y Alonso, from an old hidalgo family in La Rioja, and Teresa de Salazar y Morales, a native of Medinaceli. Although the thirdborn of eight brothers, he inherited the title of Marquis of Someruelos in 1777 (his father died in 1774) because the two eldest sons had consecrated themselves to the Church. His parents had previously determined that he should inherit the family patrimony, and to prepare for him a career suited to his position, they made generous contributions to the leadership of the Toro regiment's provincial militias.

The young Someruelos was educated by the Jesuits at the Seminary of Nobles of Madrid (Seminario de Nobles de Madrid) and the cadet school of Avila (Colegio Militar de Avila). On 30 December 1769, at age fifteen, he was commissioned as a second lieutenant in the Córdoba infantry regiment.

== Military career ==
Someruelos had attained the rank of captain of infantry when he was promoted to lieutenant colonel of the Provincial Militia Regiment of Toro on 23 September 1783. He became a full colonel of militias on 22 September 1788. He married María de la Concepción de Vidaurreta y Llano, a native of Logroño, on 18 August 1791, and the couple moved into the Casa de los Chapiteles, a palace belonging to her family.

During the War of the Pyrenees (1793–1795), which was effectively the Pyrenean front of the First Coalition's war against the French First Republic, Someruelos was sent to the front lines at Guipúzcoa as commander of arms in the first battalion. On 10 October, he was promoted to colonel of infantry. Leading over 1,000 grenadiers, he was one of the officers in charge of reconnaissance during the Spanish campaign of 1794, in which he commanded two divisions of advance troops, often under enemy fire. He was made a brevet brigadier by April 1795.

After the Peace of Basel, signed on 22 July 1795, ended the War of the Pyrenees, Someruelos was promoted from colonel of militias to field marshal and assigned to the general staff of the Spanish Army at Navarre, enabling him to reside at his home in Logroño. His son Joaquín José, who became the 3rd Marquis of Someruelos, was born on 27 October 1797. In 1798, Someruelos was one of the officers in charge of organizing the campos volantes (flying camps) of Galicia, a mobile force ready to march against the British at any time.

== Captain General of Cuba and Governor of Havana ==
Gen. Someruelos arrived in La Coruña on 3 December 1798 and went to Ferrol, where, although he had just taken the command of the campos volantes, he received orders to sail immediately for Cuba to assume office as captain general of Cuba. On his passage to Cuba, the mail ship carrying him, the brigantine Pájaro, was pursued by corsairs, so that he had to disembark in Trinidad to escape and continue to Cuba from there. Traveling overland, he was detained at Nicolás Calvo's La Holanda sugar mill in Güines by a tropical storm, and reached the capital on 1 May.

His commission included administration of the governments of Santiago de Cuba and Havana, as well as those of Spanish Louisiana and the Floridas. He was chosen to replace the Count of Santa Clara because of his reputation as a capable military leader who could defend the island against any foe. His term lasted 13 years, from 1799 to 1812, making him the longest-serving captain general in Cuba's colonial history. During his tenure, there occurred a series of memorable events, including: the slave revolts in Saint-Domingue which led to the withdrawal of France from the island of Hispaniola and the declaration of independence of Haiti in 1804; the War of the Third Coalition with its Battle of Trafalgar in 1805; the Peninsular War against the French invasion of 1808; the beginning of the Spanish-American independence movement the same year; and the enactment of the first Spanish constitution in 1812, his last year as captain general of Cuba.

Someruelos oversaw the cession of the remaining Spanish part of the island of Hispaniola to France, one of the conditions of the Peace of Basel agreed in 1795. This transfer made necessary the relocation of the Royal Audiencia of Santo Domingo to Puerto Príncipe, Cuba, ordered by the royal decree of 17 March 1799. The new Audiencia was established the following year and had jurisdiction over Cuba, Puerto Rico, Louisiana and Florida. In early February 1802, he granted a request for supplies and money to relieve the French expedition led by Napoleon's brother-in-law, Gen. Charles Leclerc, against the black and mulatto slave insurgents in Saint-Domingue.

=== Administrative accomplishments ===
As captain general of Cuba, Someruelos had determined early on in his administration to correct the deficiencies of the rule of his predecessor, the Count of Santa Clara, and to restore the progressive regime that had flourished under Luis de Las Casas. He encouraged social and cultural improvements in the country, and used the information provided by the expedition of the Royal Guantánamo Commission (Real Comision de Guantanamo) of 1796–1802 to promote the island of Cuba; in 1800 and 1804 he was visited by the scientists Alexander von Humboldt and Aimé Bonpland. As president of the Patriotic Society (Sociedad Económica de los Amigos del País de la Habana), in 1804 Someruelos invited Humboldt to investigate the hills near Havana for any significant deposits of gold or silver. Humboldt reported finding no indication of their presence in the presentation of his results before the Society.

When Havana was devastated in 1802 by fire and over 11,000 of the poorer inhabitants were made destitute, Someruelos became personally involved in efforts to aid them. He was interested in the improvement of architecture on the island, and promoted two important public works in Havana. The first, a public theatre, was built with the object of giving an impetus to the arts. The second, the Espada public cemetery, showed his interest in improving public sanitation. Executed by the Bishop of Havana, Juan José Díaz de Espada, the cemetery was located in the Villa de San Cristóbal neighborhood, and was inaugurated on 2 February 1806. Covering about 4.5 acres (1.8 ha), the cemetery was built so that the dead might be interred in one place, rather than being buried in small plots on estates, in churches, or in the yards of residences. The walls, gateway and chapel of the burying-ground were good examples of the late neoclassical Cuban architecture of the period; the mortuary chapel contained a well-executed fresco depicting the Resurrection.

Someruelos supported the introduction in 1803 of a smallpox vaccination program designed and overseen by the Cuban Criollo (Creole) doctor, Tomás Romay, and put all the island's governmental institutions and communications at the service of his mission, which coincided with the arrival in Cuba of the Real Expedición Filantrópica de la Vacuna (Royal Philanthropic Vaccine Expedition), directed by Francisco Javier de Balmis, a Spanish physician who led the expedition to Spanish America to vaccinate the populations against smallpox.

Cuban planters, represented by lawyer, politician, and planter Francisco de Arango as their spokesperson, petitioned the government to exempt coffee, cotton and sugar from all taxes, including duties, sales taxes (alcabalas), and church tithes. This was finally achieved in 1804. Exemptions were also granted for the importation of enslaved Africans and machinery for the sugarcane industry.

=== Wartime and economic crisis ===
With the resumption of the Anglo-Spanish War in 1804, and the consequent breakdown of regular communications with peninsular Spain, Someruelos was often left to his own devices in executing his office. When news of the invasion of the Iberian Peninsula by Napoleon's armies reached Cuba, he approved a petition for the formation of a Cuban junta subordinate to the Junta Suprema Central in Spain, and asked Tomás de la Cruz Muñóz on 26 July 1808 to discuss the proposed "Junta Superior de Gobierno" with Ayuntamiento members and solicit their opinion, but the proposal was met with little enthusiasm. Thereafter Someruelos acted to ensure that the territories under his command remained in Spanish control.

Because the war with Great Britain, and then with France, had disrupted the Cuban economy, the Ministry of the Indies (Ministerio de Indias) and the King had approved Someruelos's authorization of the trade with neutral parties, most of which was with ports in the United States, but only as a necessity imposed by the war. The same ship that brought from Spain the official notice of peace also bore the royal order to suspend the foreign commerce. Contrary to the policy of the Metropolitan authorities, Someruelos continued to support the illicit traffic and consequently clashed with the successive intendants (intendentes), who supervised the treasury and the collection of taxes. Appointed directly by the Crown, they had fiscal powers that gave them a say in almost all administrative, ecclesiastical and military matters. Intendant Luis de Viguri (1798–1803), a protege of Manuel Godoy, had many bitter disputes with Someruelos and with members of his own staff before he was recalled. Someruelos's relationship with the intendendants was complicated by the fact that they had official control of the captaincy's finances, but also unofficially represented the commercial interests of the merchants in Spain and their special trading privileges. Besides these concerns, he had to manage as well the economic crisis on the island that began when the United States declared an embargo in 1807.

=== Political intrigues in Cuba ===
In 1808 Someruelos readied Cuba's defenses for a rumoured invasion of the island by Great Britain and issued a proclamation, signed 27 January, announcing these preparations and urging inhabitants to defend the island if necessary. The expected invasion, however, never materialized. The same year, the captaincy general assisted the Spanish troops in the reconquest of Santo Domingo. Thomas Jefferson sent the disreputable and corrupt Gen. James Wilkinson as an envoy to the Spanish authorities in Cuba, during the height of the economic crisis caused by the embargo. Jefferson, who desired that the United States should ultimately possess the Floridas, hoped to establish friendly diplomatic relations with the Spaniards to forestall France or Great Britain from gaining political or commercial control of the region around the Gulf of Mexico, especially the Spanish colonies of Cuba and Mexico.

Charged with containing the Pan-American imperialism of the United States, and having heard that Wilkinson had proposed a toast at a banquet in Norfolk to "the New World governed by itself and independent of the Old", Someruelos refused to meet him when he finally arrived in Havana on 22 March 1809 (after Jefferson's administration had ended). The United States subsequently supported the revolts against Spanish rule in Baton Rouge and Mobile in West Florida, although support in those areas for the rebellion was hardly unanimous. There were competing pro-Spanish, pro-American, and pro-independence factions, as well as scores of foreign agents, and it eventually fell under US rule in December 1810.

By 1808 Someruelos had "begun to exile French citizens—including emigrants from Saint Domingue—from Havana as a precaution against Napoleonic intrigues in that city." In 1809 there were riots in Santiago and Havana against local French-Haitian émigré business interests. The first proposals for Cuban national independence were made the same year, and on 27 October, pamphlets critical of the Spanish authorities appeared in Puerto Principe, for which Diego Antonio del Castillo Betancourt, twice mayor of Puerto Príncipe and a former navy captain, was arrested and prosecuted for the crime of reo de lesa majestad.

Joseph Bonaparte, the brother of Napoleon and usurper of the Spanish throne, wanting to gain the support of the Spanish American colonies, had sent agents using false identities to the United States with the purpose of infiltrating the colonies in the Antilles and in continental North America. Among them was a French-born young man of Mexican nationality, Manuel Rodríguez Alemán. His mission was discovered by spies in the service of Luis de Onís, the Spanish envoy to the United States in charge of the Spanish legation in Philadelphia. Consequently, Onís bribed the captain of the Spanish brigantine San Antonio on which Alemán embarked in Norfolk for Campeche. Alleging the need to stop first in Havana for repairs to the ship, the captain delivered his hapless passenger to Governor Someruelos on 18 July 1810.

Alemán's luggage was seized, and then was opened in the presence of Someruelos, who summoned a carpenter to dismantle a chest in which were found papers addressed to the Spanish authorities in Cuba and the rest of Spanish colonial America, a copy of the Bayonne Constitution intended to be delivered to the Audiencia of Puerto Principe, and documents highlighting the successes of Napoleon's armies in Spain. On 30 July 1810, Alemán was condemned as guilty of high treason and hanged in Havana.

On 4 October 1810, the so-called "Masonic Conspiracy of 1810" was thwarted. This affair involved the Cuban separatists Román de la Luz, a prominent landowner, and Joaquín Infante, a lawyer from Bayamo, both of whom were active Masons who advocated radical political ideas from Europe. In 1812, Infante, living in Caracas, wrote his "Constitutional Project for the Island of Cuba", a political constitution for a future Cuban nation, and was imprisoned by the Spanish authorities for his writings.

== Later years ==
On 15 July 1810, there arrived in Havana the royal order of 16 April appointing the captain general of the Balearic Islands, Lt. Gen. José de Heredia, to the captaincy general of Cuba, as well as the presidency of the Audiencia and the governorship of Havana. Someruelos, however, remained in office even after his replacement had arrived in the capital, and on 6 September 1810 he again received the royal order to surrender his office. Mainly because of the representations made in his favor by the Real Consulado and the cabildo of Havana, the Regency Council (Consejo de Regencia) reviewed his record as governor and confirmed him for another five years. On 30 January 1811, Someruelos received notice of the extension of his administrative tenure.

Someruelos brutally suppressed the anti-slavery revolt led by the Yoruba political activist José Antonio Aponte, who was inspired by rumors of the debates concerning the abolition of slavery taking place in the Cortes of Cádiz. On 19 March 1812, Aponte and eight other conspirators were arrested, and after three weeks of interrogation were executed by hanging on 8 April; the next day his body was decapitated and his head put on public display in a cage. Thirty-three slaves and free persons of color were hanged. These events took place in the social context of a plantation society dependent on slave labor for its very existence; consequently the powerful sugar planters defended the institution of slavery in Cuba with vigor. When Someruelos was finally relieved of his command on 14 April 1812 by Juan Ruiz de Apodaca, Lieutenant General of the Army and the Navy, the island was at peace.

While still in Havana, Someruelos received his appointment on 2 July 1812 as a councillor of the Tribunal especial de Guerra y Marina. Two acute attacks of gout and the danger of a passage on the high seas during wartime prevented his leaving Havana until 13 April 1813. After an uneventful voyage he arrived on 18 May in Cádiz, and took his seat in the Tribunal on 26 May. In October he moved to Madrid with his wife and son, staying at his mother's house, from where he tried to reorganize his holdings, which had been damaged in the war. Now surrounded by his family and a chosen society, he enjoyed the first quiet period in his career. On the night of 13 December, moments after having drunk some chocolate at a gathering with former comrades in arms and distinguished guests, he had a stroke and died within a few hours, only 58 years old. Baselessly, some people attributed his death to the effects of a poison given him in revenge for the torture and hanging of Manuel Rodríguez Alemán in Havana.

According to the posthumous eulogy made in 1814 by Francisco Filomeno, "Know everything, pretend much, punish little" was Someruelos's personal motto of conduct. It is not known how Someruelos might have reconciled these sentiments with his issuing of orders to torture and execute numerous persons accused of political crimes. Filomeno said of him: "without pride or ostentation, simple in his speech as in his habits, he was unknown to his own eyes and ignored the rights he had to public esteem."

== See also ==
- History of Cuba
- Captaincy General of Cuba
- List of colonial governors of Cuba
- Marquis de Somerulas (1800 ship) – a ship named for the Marquis that in 1809 first brought Brazilian coffee to the United States
