= Carlota (rebel leader) =

Cuban slave rebellion leader (died 1844)

A map illustrating the province of Matanzas, where Carlota's memorial site is held.

Carlota Lucumí, also known as La Negra Carlota (died November 1844) was an African-born enslaved Cuban woman of Yoruba origin. Carlota, alongside fellow enslaved Lucumí Ferminia, was known as a leader of the slave rebellion at the Triunvirato plantation in Matanzas, Cuba during the Year of the Lash in 1843–1844. Together with Ferminia Lucumí, Carlota led the slave uprising of the sugar mill "Triunvirato" in the province of Matanzas, Cuba on November 5, 1843.

Her memory has also been utilized throughout history by the Cuban government in connection to 20th century political goals, most notably Operation Carlota, or Cuba's intervention in Angola in 1975. Little is known about Carlota beyond her martyrdom.Scholars of Afro-Cuban history have grappled with the dearth of reliable sources that document slaves' lives, and the ability of written documents to accurately encompass the reality of slave life. Slave testimonies obtained under investigations after rebellions provide most of the information surrounding Carlota and her contemporaries, making it difficult to construct a complete understanding of her involvement in the 1843 slave rebellion, much less a detailed biography.

Carlota is considered significant by scholars due to her role as a woman in an otherwise male-dominated sphere of slave revolt, as well as the way her memory has been employed in the public sphere in Cuba. Carlota and the uprising at Triunvirato plantation are honored as part of the UNESCO Slave Route Project through a sculpture at the Triunvirato plantation, which has since been turned into a memorial and museum.

== Biography and importance ==
Carlota is perhaps the most famous historical actor in the Triunvirato rebellion. She is known for her leadership in the Triunvirato slave rebellion alongside Eduardo, Narciso, and Felipe Lucumí, and Manuel Gangá. However, little is known about her life outside of her involvement in the rebellion. She was an African-born Lucumí woman, but the date of her birth is unclear. She died in battle at the end of the brief revolt after it had spread to the San Rafael plantation. The Triunvirato rebellion was the last in a series of slave uprisings known as La Escalera in Cuba in 1843 and 1844, which resulted in a violent wave of repression against enslaved people and free people of color by the Spanish colonial government and other whites.

According to scholarship on the topic, Carlota played a role in the Triunvirato rebellion by spreading it from the Triunvirato plantation to the neighboring Acaná plantation by garnering the support of masses of slaves, reaching a total of five plantations by the end of the revolt. Other slaves knew her at the time for her violent attack on the overseer's daughter, which was brought up throughout many of the slave testimonies collected after the rebellion. Several Cuban scholars have categorized her as a martyr who died in the fight for freedom, and whose memory has been mobilized to show slave revolts as a natural precursor to the Cuban socialist revolution of 1959.

== Gender ==
Carlota and another slave, Firmina, were two women among a number of men who organized and executed the slave revolt at the Triunvirato plantation. Scholars have generally characterized slave insurrection as a heavily masculine and violent affair. Enslaved women such as Carlota and Firmina disrupt the idea of slave rebellion as being only organized and carried out by men. At the time, most other representations of slave women were usually traitorous or sexualized. By serving as a leader, and eventually being conceptualized in the 20th century as a martyr of the Triunvirato rebellion, Carlota became symbolized in Cuban memory as a strong woman who would eventually come to represent ideas of Cubanness and revolution.

== Triunvirato rebellion ==
The Triunvirato rebellion was one in a series of slave uprisings throughout Cuba in 1843. It was characterized by massive violence against white overseers and plantation owners, as well as immense property damage. The series of uprisings of which Triunvirato was a part is known as La Escalera, meaning ladder in Spanish. Its name derives from the most notable form of torture inflicted on slaves and free people of color during the wave of repression that followed the violent end of the rebellion. The Triunvirato rebellion, as well as La Escalera more broadly, are important to Cuban history in that they marked the peak of white fear of slave uprising and the end of a streak of slave revolts throughout the first half of the 19th century that wouldn't pick up again until the start of Cuba's independence movement against Spain in 1868.

Shifting imperial and economic conditions in Cuba in the first half of the nineteenth century fomented a wave of slave rebellions in the 1830s and 40s. Historians differ on where they locate the cause of the slave uprisings of the first half of the 19th century. Some cite the intensification of plantation style farming, increasing numbers of enslaved people trafficked to Cuba during the era, and the spread of rebellious news and ideology among people of color on the island as the main drivers behind the organization and execution of La Escalera. Other historians have emphasized the impact of the neighboring Caribbean island of Haiti's independence movement and abolition of slavery, which served to intensify plantation-style sugar production in Cuba as well as spread revolutionary ideas to people on the island. Still others draw a direct line between earlier Cuban slave revolts of the century, like the 1812 Aponte rebellion led by José Antonio Aponte. It is impossible to know exactly what conditions led to the slave revolts that constituted La Escalera, but the wave of violence and repression that followed was indisputable.

The way in which La Escalera has been written about since its occurrence is wrought with controversy. Many understood it as a massive conspiracy by the Cuban government to justify the repression inflicted upon people of color at the time, with no actual slave resistance efforts taking place. This served to erase any knowledge of slave movement for freedom. However, part of La Escalera and the ensuing repression's significance came from their inspiring new rebellious groups to form throughout the century in Cuba.

== Methodological difficulties ==
A majority of the information gleaned about La Escalera and Carlota's role in inciting slave rebellion come from slave testimonies and other archival records. Historians have pointed out the issue in utilizing certain information found in the archive, particularly slave testimonies, as fact. Historian Aisha Finch points out the irony in trying to understand the experiences of enslaved people who suffered immense oppression and violence through the writings and records of those people who inflicted said violence. Usually, slave testimonies were taken during times of intense repression, under hierarchical (if not violent) power relations between colonial officials and slaves. Slaves frequently deployed strategic answers for survival, which then had to be taken down by a mediator with undoubtedly different goals and biases than the person whose testimony was being written. Finch refers to documents created by white officials at the time as "fictitious" due to their deeply biased and violent nature. However, authors and historians have worked to read archival documents critically to understand a more nuanced perspective of biased material to complete a narrative of slave agency and insurrection.

In many scholarly analyses of La Escalera, Carlota, as well as Ferminia, is only mentioned briefly or left out entirely. For example, in Cuban historian José Luciano Franco's analysis of the Triunvirato rebellion, Carlota takes a backseat to the male leaders of the revolt. Similarly, in other texts on the rebellion like Ricardo Vazquez's Triunvirato – Historia de un Rincon Azucarero de Cuba and Manuel Barcia's Seeds of Insurrection, Carlota is barely mentioned, although Barcia has since discussed her role and that of her co-leader Ferminia Lucumí in West African Warfare in Bahia and Cuba: Soldier Slaves in the Atlantic World, from 2014. While it is impossible to know exactly why Carlota's impact has only been taken up by a relatively small number of scholars, her absence can serve to reify the traditional view of slave rebellion as a particularly masculine affair. The most common reference to Carlota throughout the literature is Cuba's intervention in Angola, named after her as Operación Carlota. Additionally, testimonies of women and about women are scant in the archive. Due to Carlota's sparse mentions and perhaps misrepresentation in the archive, as well as her absence from secondary sources, it is difficult to understand a holistic picture of her life and specific role in La Escalera.

== The memory of Carlota ==
Long after Carlota's death in the aftermath of the Triunvirato rebellion, her memory was mobilized by the post-revolutionary Cuban state. Cuba's intervention in Angola in 1974 to aid in its independence struggle was named after the rebel slave woman, in an event known as Operación Carlota. Historian Myra Ann Houser and others have illuminated how Fidel Castro and his revolutionary government capitalized on Cuba's enslaved and rebellious past to further their political aims. A key tenet of this line of thinking was Castro's ideology of the oppressed rising up to defeat the oppressor, as enslaved people had done in Cuba throughout the 19th century. This attitude is exemplified in Cuban historian José Luciano Franco's analysis of the Triunvirato rebellion, where he explicitly calls the slaves that incited rebellion in the 19th century "precursors" to the 1959 revolution. Franco cites Fidel Castro's own speeches linking Cuba's slave past to his revolutionary aims. This conceptualization of history as dialectical materialism characterized Castro's vision for Cuba and the thinking behind his revolutionary ideology, painting the United States as the ultimate imperial power and oppressor, and nations like Cuba and Angola as the oppressed rising up against it.

Using the name of an African-born Cuban slave woman in an intervention in Africa was no coincidence, either. Castro built upon this connection to show Cuba's intervention in Angola as a sort of homecoming, or vengeance, of the Afro-descendant population in Cuba. The revolutionary government mobilized this "claim to roots" in justifying its intervention in the African nation. The government tapped into its enslaved and rebellious past to highlight it as a natural precursor to the 1959 socialist revolution, and the continuous revolutionary spirit of 20th century Cuba. Castro's ability to do this rested on the particular conceptualization of race relations in Cuba at the time, which emphasized Cubanidad, or Cubanness, over racial identity. Ideas of nation-building took precedence over racial divisions, allowing Castro to conceptualize Cuba's African past as affecting all of its citizens equally in the 20th century, and thus justifying a "return" to Angola in the 1970s. By connecting the 19th century slave struggle for freedom, Cuba's 20th century fight against Western neocolonialism, and Africa's 20th century fight for independence, Carlota's memory proved a useful tool to advance Cuban revolutionary ideals.

Aside from Operación Carlota in Angola, Carlota came back onto the scene of public memory through UNESCO's Slave Route Project. A memorial was erected in 1991 at the Triunvirato plantation where the rebellion took place, commemorating rebel slave leadership. The memory site at Triunvirato, according to the Cuban newspaper Granma, was erected to honor Carlota and the legacy Cuban slaves have had on Cuban society and culture today. The Slave Route Project is intended "to break the silence surrounding the slave trade and slavery that have concerned all continents and caused the great upheavals that have shaped our modern societies". The project's goals are to better illuminate the history of slavery, understand what global transformations came from its legacies, and contribute to an international culture of peace.

In 2015, the Triunvirato memory site was used as the location to celebrate the 40th anniversary of Operación Carlota. This illuminates how Carlota's image in Cuban memory is intimately linked to the nation's intervention in Africa. In another Granma article, the aforementioned mobilization of Carlota's memory in the Cuban public sphere is reified – Carlota is exalted, and again referred to as a "precursor" to the socialist revolution of 1959. Carlota remains solidified in Cuban public memory as an embodiment of Cuban revolutionary ideals.

== See also ==
- List of women who led a revolt or rebellion
- List of slaves

== Bibliography ==
Barcia, Manuel. Seeds of Insurrection: Domination and Resistance on Western Cuban Plantations, 1808-1848 (Baton Rouge: Louisiana University Press, 2008)

Barcia, Manuel. West African Warfare in Bahia and Cuba: Soldier Slaves in the Atlantic World (Oxford and New York: Oxford University Press, 2014).

Curry-Machado, Jonathan. "How Cuba Burned with the Ghosts of British Slavery: Race, Abolition and The Escalera." Slavery & Abolition, vol. 25, no. 1, 2004, pp. 71–93.

De Jesús, Ventura. "El Legado De Triunvirato." Granma, 4 Nov. 2015.

Ferrer, Ada, et al. The World of the Haitian Revolution. Indiana University Press, 2009.

Finch, Aisha K. Rethinking Slave Rebellion in Cuba: La Escalera and the Insurgencies of 1841-1844. University of North Carolina Press, 2015.

Franco, José Luciano. La Gesta Heroica Del Triunvirato. Editorial De Ciencias Sociales, 1978.

García Rodríguez, Gloria. Conspiraciones y Revueltas: La Actividad Política De Los Negros En Cuba (1790-1845). Ed. Oriente, 2003.

George, Edward. The Cuban Intervention in Angola: 1965-1991: from Che Guevara to Cuito Cuanavale. Frank Cass, 2005.

Hartman, S. "Venus in Two Acts." Small Axe: A Caribbean Journal of Criticism, vol. 12, no. 2, Jan. 2008, pp. 1–14.

Houser, Myra Ann. "Avenging Carlota in Africa: Angola and the Memory of Cuban Slavery."Atlantic Studies, vol. 12, no. 1, Feb. 2015, pp. 50–66.

Paquette, Robert L. Sugar Is Made with Blood: the Conspiracy of La Escalera and the Conflict between Empires over Slavery in Cuba. Wesleyan University Press, 1988. Barcia, Manuel. Seeds of Insurrection: Domination and Slave Resistance on Western Cuban Plantations, 1808-1848. Louisiana State University Press, 2008.

Peters, Christabelle. "Crossing the Black Atlantic to Africa: Research on Race in 'Race-less' Cuba," New Perspectives on the Black Atlantic. Definitions, Readings, Practices, Dialogues. Eds. Bénédicte Ledent and Pilar Cuder-Domínguez. New York: Peter Lang, 2012. pp. 83–104

Redacción Digital. "Celebran Acto Central Por El Aniversario 40 De La Operación Carlota (+Fotos)." Granma, 5 Nov. 2015.

"The Slave Route." Slave Route | United Nations Educational, Scientific and Cultural Organization, UNESCO, www.unesco.org/new/en/social-and-human-sciences/themes/slave-route/.

Vazquez, Ricardo. Triunvirato: Historia De Un Rincon Azucarero De Cuba. Comisión De Orientación Revolucionaria Del Comité Central Del PCC, 1972.
