= Johanna Ferrour =

14th century English peasant leader

Johanna Ferrour, also known as Joanna Ferrour or Joan Marchall, was a leader of the 1381 Peasants' Revolt in England. Originally from Rochester, she led a group of rebels that burned the Savoy Palace, stormed the Tower of London, and she ordered the execution of Archbishop Simon Sudbury and Robert Hales. Ferrour, like many others who participated in the revolt, rose after the implementation of the much-hated poll taxes of 1376–1381. Despite her violent deeds, there is no record that she was ever convicted of any charges brought against her after the revolt.

== Name ==
Ferrour is attested as both Johanna Ferrour and Joan Marchall in official documents. Johanna and Joan are variants of the same name while the surnames Ferrour and Marchall both suggest that her husband John was a shoer of horses. Ferrour is a Middle English word meaning a blacksmith who makes horseshoes. Similarly, Marchall is a form of Marshal which in Middle English sometimes referred to a farrier or master of horses. In an era where surnames were not concrete and were commonly a nod to one's profession the usage of Ferrour and Marchall interchangeably is not surprising.

== Background ==
Little is known about Ferrour's life before the revolt. Most of the knowledge on Ferrour is from King's Bench Court Rolls from her case after the revolt. Evidence points to Ferrour's origins in Rochester, Kent. She is listed as the wife of John of Rochester in both the Court Rolls that detail the charges brought against her after the revolt, and a Close Roll in 1386. The Close Roll also details a property settlement that lists Johanna Ferrour's husband as John Ferrour of Rochester. The Ferrours owned a significant amount of land as they were able to gift two houses in Rochester to Walter Northampton. From the surnames listed in the property settlement, it is likely that Johanna's husband worked as a blacksmith, specialising in making horseshoes.

== The Revolt ==
Johanna Ferrour was an important leader in the Peasants' Revolt and the charges brought against her after the revolt reflect her role. Ferrour was recorded as the "chief perpetrator and leader" of a group of peasants who burned the Savoy Palace and attacked the Tower of London. A court roll detailing her exploits, translated by Sylvia Federico, reads:

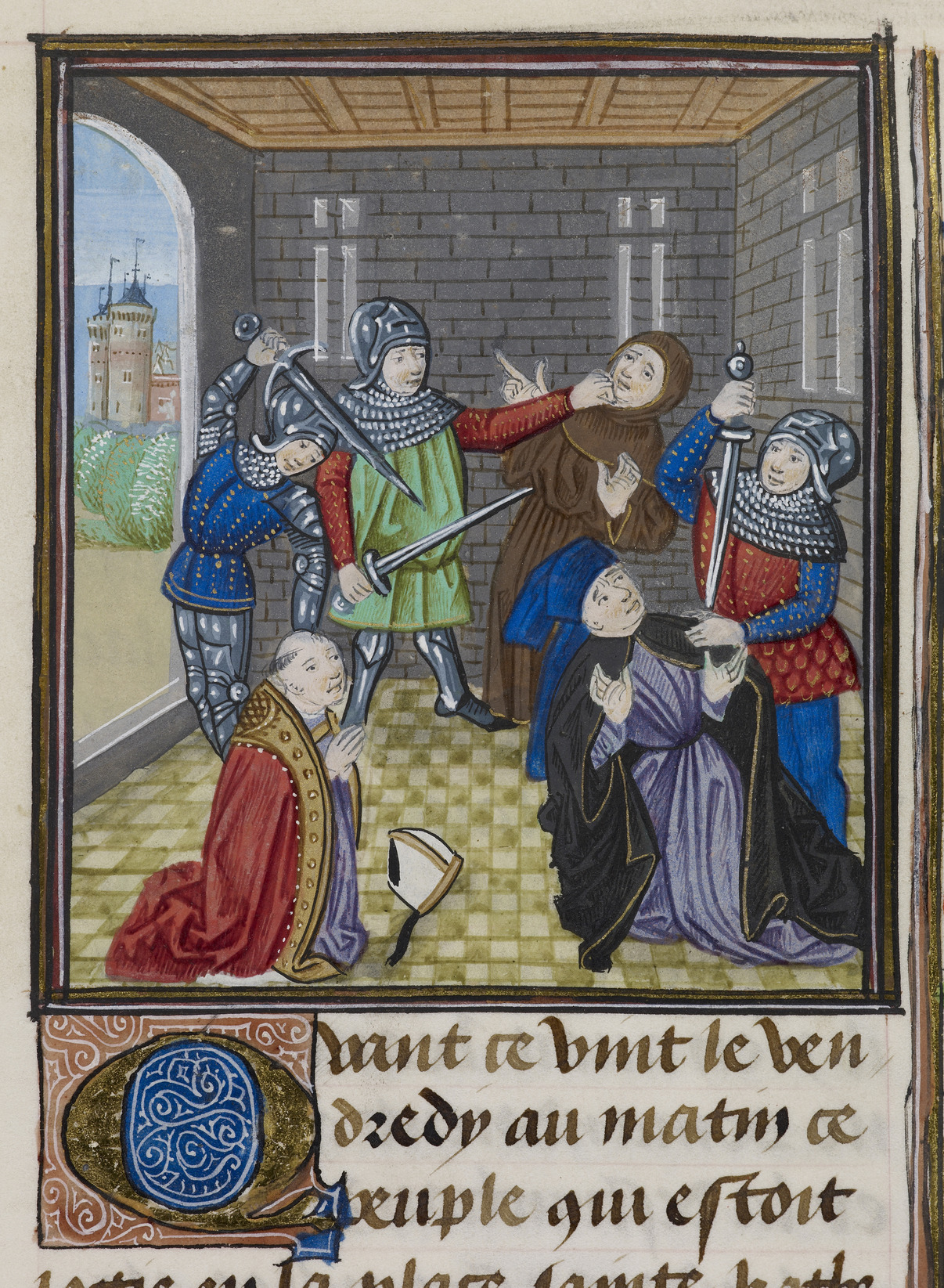
A depiction of the murder of Simon Sudbury and Robert Hales at the Tower of London

"Johanna... went as the chief perpetrator and leader of a great society of rebellious evildoers from Kent... to the Savoy in the county of Middlesex and, as an enemy of the king, burned the said manor; she seized a chest containing £1,000 and more belonging to John, Duke of Lancaster, and then she put the said chest into a boat on the Thames and made off with it, all the way to Southwark, where she divided the gold between herself and others... Together with others, Johanna went as the chief leader to the Tower of London, and she laid violent hands first on Simon, recently Archbishop of Canterbury, and then on Brother Robert Hales... and she dragged them out of the Tower and ordered that they be beheaded."

Figures such as Archbishop Simon Sudbury and Treasurer Robert Hales were targeted by Ferrour and the other peasants due to their roles in passing and collecting the hated poll tax of 1380. Ferrour's plunder of £1,000 was a large sum: the Bank of England equates £1,000 in 1381 to over £900,000 in 2025. Both of the Ferrours' names show up in an aforementioned property settlement from 1386 which is evidence they survived their trials and were not executed, which would have been the punishment for a guilty verdict. Federico notes that Ferrour's husband John was acquitted of the charges brought against him.

== John Ferrour of Rochester ==
Ferrour's husband John may have played a significant role in the events at the Tower of London. A man named John Ferrour is said to have saved the life of the young Earl of Derby Henry Bolingbroke, the future King Henry IV, during the peasants' attack on the Tower of London. This favour is said to have been repaid by Henry as he pardoned the same John Ferrour after Ferrour rebelled against him twenty years later. The John Ferrour who saved the life of future King Henry IV is often named "John Ferrour of Southwark" but Given-Wilson suggests that Henry's saviour may have been John Ferrour of Rochester. Barker concurs that it is possible that John Ferrour, otherwise Marchall, of Rochester is the man who spared the 14-year-old Henry Bolingbroke. While only conjecture, the one "John Ferrour of Rochester" who is certainly known to have been in the Tower of London during the attack is the husband of Johanna. John Ferrour also had a history of violence when in 1380 he was pardoned of murder. Therefore, it is possible that the Ferrours played much more of a consequential role in English history than just being members of the Revolt of 1381.

== Significance ==
Johanna Ferrour's role in the Peasants' Revolt of 1381 not only shows that women participated in social revolt in medieval England, but shows that on occasion women were even leaders of revolt. Her story is one of a common woman leading others to fight against what they deemed as unjust taxation and governance. Stories like hers are rarely seen in medieval Europe as women rarely led riots or revolts in the Middle Ages.

== Representations in popular culture ==
In the audio drama I Cannot Sleep, a 2017 episode of the podcast Outliers: Stories from the Edge of History, Ferrour featured as the narrator of the episode. She opened with the line "my name is Johanna Ferrour, you do not know me" and told the story of her leadership of the Peasants' Revolt. She is also the central protagonist in the Marie-Fleur Albecker's novel Et j'abattrai l'arrogance des tyrans (And I will bring down the arrogance of tyrants).

== See also ==
- List of women who led a revolt or rebellion
