= HMS Magnet (1812) =

Brig of the Royal Navy

History

United Kingdom
- Name: HMS Magnet
- Acquired: 1812 by capture
- Renamed: HMS Attentive (c.1814?)
- Fate: Broken up 1817

General characteristics
- Tons burthen: 35864/94 (bm)
- Length: 96 ft 6 in (29.4 m) (overall); 84 ft 0 in (25.6 m)
- Beam: 28 ft 4 in (8.6 m)
- Depth of hold: 13 ft 6 in (4.1 m)
- Sail plan: Brig

HMS Magnet was an American brig captured in 1812. HMS Magnet served during the War of 1812 as a prison ship at Halifax, Nova Scotia. The Royal Navy eventually renamed her Attentive, possibly in 1814 when the Navy acquired Sir Sydney Smith, which it renamed Magnet. Then as Attentive she served as a store ship, still apparently on the Halifax station, before she sailed to Britain in 1816. She was broken up in January 1817.

== History ==
The records on this vessel are sparse, and somewhat contradictory. Winfield states that she was a privateer, but the most comprehensive list of American privateers, that of Emmons, does not list a privateer named Magnet. The records of the Halifax Vice admiralty court for the War of 1812 do list a Magnet. She was a ship of 172 tons (bm), T. Drew, master, that HMS Ringdove captured on 18 July 1812 as Magnet was sailing from Belfast to New York City. She was carrying passengers and a small amount of linens. The records state that Magnet was "Taken into possession for the use of the King's service." However, Magnet's burthen is not consistent with that of HMS Attentive. Curiously, the same Vice admiralty records show that HMS Atalante captured Marquis de Somerlous on 10 July 1812. Marquis de Somerlous was a ship of 359 tons (bm), the only one of that burthen on the Vice admiralty's records. Under the command of T. Moriarty, master, she had been sailing from Civitavecchia to Salem, Massachusetts, with a cargo of brandy, wines, silks, and dry goods when Atalanta captured her. Her name as given in a London Gazette list of British captures was Marquis Somnielos.

Newspaper accounts of Attentive's service exist:

- 5 July 1815, arrived Halifax, the store ship Attentive, Lt. Stewart, 5 days from Moose Island, Maine.
- 19 May 1816, arrived Halifax, Lt. Smith, from Bermuda.
- 25 July 1816, arrived Halifax, from Sydney, N.S.
- 9 September 1816, departed Halifax, for England, with Gen. Gasselin and family passengers.
