= Marquis de Somerulas (1800 ship) =

History

United States of America
- Name: Marquis of Somerulas
- Namesake: Salvador José de Muro, 2nd Marquis of Someruelos
- Owner: John and Richard Gardner, New York
- Port of registry: 14 January 1800, Charlestown, Boston
- Captured: 10 July 1812

General characteristics
- Tons burthen: 359 (bm)

Marquis de Somerulas (or Marquis de Someruelas) was a United States merchant ship launched circa 1800, possibly at Charlestown, Boston. She survived an attack by Malay pirates in 1807. The British Royal Navy captured her in 1812. She probably became HMS Magnet. If so, she then served as a prison ship at Halifax, Nova Scotia. The Royal Navy eventually renamed her Attentive. As Attentive she served as a store ship, still apparently on the Halifax station, before she sailed to Britain in 1816. Attentive was broken up in January 1817.

== Career ==
Marquis de Somerulas had at least three masters in her career. The first, in 1800, was William Story (or Storey).

On 18 September 1806, Malays at Sumatra attacked Marquis de Somerulas, Story, master. She had sailed there from the United States to take on a cargo of pepper for Europe. Story had let 14 Malays, who had arrived in two proas, to come on deck. At the time the mate and most of the crew were below deck storing cargo; only four of Marquis de Somerulas's crew were on deck. The Malays killed Mr. Bromfield, the clerk, with their kris. They also attacked Story with boarding pikes as he was coming up the companionway. Marquis de Somerulas's crew rallied, forcing the Malays to retreat. In all, Marquis de Somerulas had lost one man killed and had several men wounded, but the crew had succeeded in repelling the attack.

Marquis de Somerulas's master in 1809 was Thomas Russell. Her last master, in 1811, was Thomas Moriarty.

In 1809, Marquis de Someruelas brought 1,522 bags of coffee from Brazil to Salem, Massachusetts. This was the first coffee from Brazil to come to the United States.

On 10 July 1812, HMS Atalante captured a vessel of 359 tons (bm). The prize had been carrying wine, brandy, silks, and sundries from Civitavchia to Salem. The London Gazette gave the vessel's name as Marquis Somnielos. The Vice admiralty court in Halifax, Nova Scotia, gave her name as Marquis de Somerlous, with T. Moriarty, master.

Her cargo included art for the Academy of Arts in Philadelphia. The owners of the Marquis de Someruelas on 31 August 1812 wrote to James Monroe, American Secretary of State at the time, pleading for intervention. They pointed out that when Atalante captured Marquis de Someruelas, neither captain was aware that war between the United states and Britain had broken out. Captain Frederick Hickey, of Atalante, had simply suspected Marquis de Someruelas of carrying goods from the enemy port of Leghorn and brought her to Halifax for further examination.
