= Sasî movement =

Ancient Assyrian conspiracy (671–670 BCE)

The Sasî movement (Note: There is no widely used collective term for the different conspiracies against Esarhaddon. Karen Radner used the term "Sasî movement" in a 2003 paper.) was a set of conspiracies and plots directed against the Assyrian king Esarhaddon in 671–670 BCE, each in some way involving Sasî, a high-ranking official of dubious loyalty. Aimed at dethroning Esarhaddon, the conspiracies involved the simultaneous proclamation of perhaps as many as three rival contenders for the throne, including Sasî himself. Conspirators were active throughout the Assyrian Empire, apparently concentrated around the city of Harran but also operating in Babylonia and even in central Assyria.

Official Assyrian records contain no information on the conspiracies, and their history is instead reconstructed based on contemporary letters and indirect evidence. The earliest known reference that may be related to the later events dates to 675 BCE. The true beginning of the conspiracies was likely connected to the 671 BCE Assyrian conquest of Egypt, in particular Esarhaddon's visit to Harran prior to the conquest. During this visit, Esarhaddon received a prophecy that foretold the successful invasion. The king also showed himself in public, which made the general populace aware of his poor physical health. In ancient Assyria, poor health was seen as indicating divine displeasure with a king's rule. Through his extensive spy network and loyalist informants, Esarhaddon was able to uncover the conspiracies and responded by enacting a brutal massacre of suspected officials, likely causing more serious damage to the empire than it would have suffered if one of the conspiracies had succeeded.

== Background ==
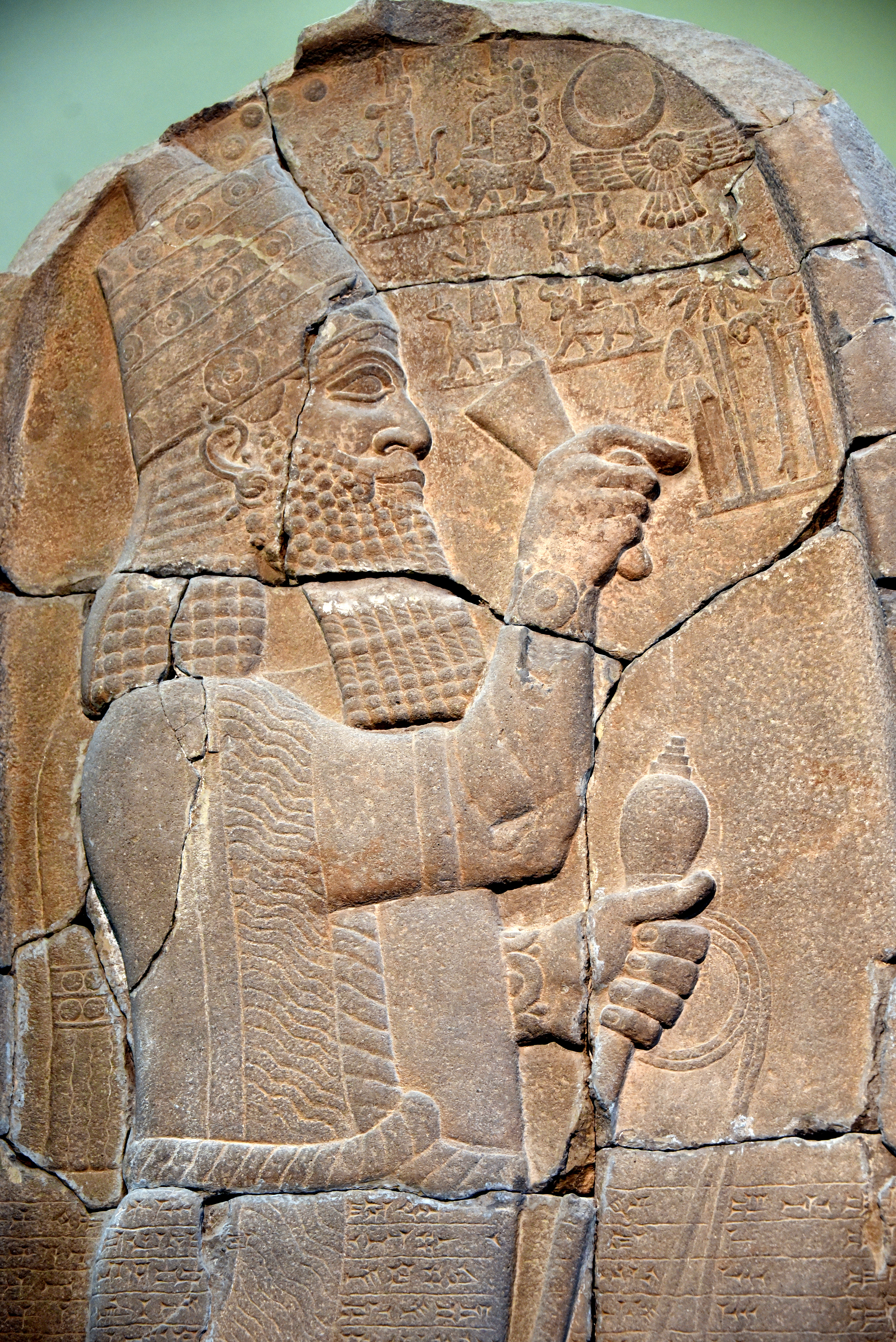
Esarhaddon as depicted on his victory stele (671 BCE)

Esarhaddon ruled the Neo-Assyrian Empire 681–669 BCE. In this time, Assyria was the dominant power in the Middle East, with its empire covering what is today Iraq, Syria, and Lebanon, alongside large parts of Palestine, Iran, and Turkey. Every citizen of the empire was tied to the reigning king through a loyalty oath, imposed on the populace during important events such as the accession of a new king or the proclamation of an heir to the throne. Any male relative of the Assyrian king had a claim to the throne; the incumbent ruler appointed a crown prince, typically one of his sons, who was given administrative duties to prepare for their reign.

Esarhaddon was named crown prince by his father Sennacherib in 683. In doing so, Sennacherib dismissed the previous crown prince, Esarhaddon's elder half-brother Arda-Mulissu. Arda-Mulissu had served as crown prince for well over twelve years and, after failing to convince his father to reappoint him, orchestrated a plot to murder Sennacherib and seize power. Esarhaddon only succeeded in becoming king after defeating his brother's loyalists and the events had great effect on him thereafter. A great purge of officials was conducted upon Esarhaddon's accession, for instance involving the execution of the entire security staffs of the palaces in Nineveh (the Assyrian capital) and Nimrud. For the rest of his reign, Esarhaddon was paranoid and distrustful of those around him.

Another issue that plagued Esarhaddon was his health. The king was often struck with severe illness, facing symptoms such as fever, dizziness, vomiting, diarrhea, and painful earaches. His most visible and alarming condition was a large skin rash that covered large parts of his body, including his face. The royal physicians were unable to treat these symptoms. Esarhaddon was also depressed and appears to have struggled with a constant fear of death. These issues only grew worse after his wife, Queen Ešarra-ḫammat, died in 673. The surviving sources all indicate that Esarhaddon was a worried and frail king who mostly preferred his own company. An essential element of royal legitimacy in Assyria was that the king was of perfect health, both physically and mentally. Esarhaddon's condition would have been worrying to the general populace and would have been interpreted as the gods opposing the king's rule. Esarhaddon's inner circle thus worked to successfully ensure that the king's condition was hidden from the public.

Despite the chaotic beginning of Esarhaddon's reign and his personal problems, he was a largely successful king. In 673, he attempted to invade Egypt but was defeated by Pharaoh Taharqa. Although this was the first major Assyrian defeat in centuries, Esarhaddon was undeterred. In early 671, he attempted another invasion. On the way to Egypt with the army, Esarhaddon visited the city of Harran to consult with the cult of the moon-god Sin. This visit is likely connected to Esarhaddon's disease. Every Mesopotamian deity was connected with a specific curse and Sin's curse was an incurable skin disease. While trying to appease Sin in Harran, Esarhaddon also received an encouraging prophecy from the local priests: he would succeed in conquering Egypt. Three months later, the Assyrian army was victorious in its first battle against Taharqa. Eleven days after this victory, Esarhaddon retired from the campaign and performed the "substitute king" ritual (Note: This ritual was conducted in times that the king was believed to be in imminent danger. The king exchanged places with a substitute for a hundred days; this substitute wore the king's clothes and acted like him in every conceivable way while the king was hidden from the public and known only by the alias qatinnu ("the farmer"). The ritual was an attempt to trick fate by redirecting the danger intended for the king to the substitute.) which left him gone for a hundred days. The Assyrian invasion of Egypt was then likely led by the chief eunuch, Aššur-naṣir. Eunuchs were employed in many high-ranking Assyrian positions since they were believed to lack dynastic ambitions due to not being able to father children. Under Aššur-naṣir, the Assyrians defeated Taharqa's forces again, captured and plundered Memphis, and conquered Egypt.

Although the conquest of Egypt was Esarhaddon's greatest triumph, his visit to Harran before the campaign had unforeseen effects. That the prophecy of the conquest had been correct gave prophecies from Harran a certain trustworthiness. More alarmingly, it appears that the visit also made the populace aware of Esarhaddon's physical condition, which had up until that point been avoided and may have raised questions about his right to the throne.

== Sources ==
The official documentation of the Neo-Assyrian Empire, such as the royal inscriptions by Esarhaddon and the Neo-Assyrian chronicles, do not mention any plots against Esarhaddon. The history of the conspiracies of 671–670 instead has to be constructed through indirect evidence in some chronicle texts, as well as from contemporary letters written on clay tablets. The poorly preserved nature of several of the letters and their implicit writing style (the recipient was assumed to understand the surrounding context) makes reconstructing the full sequence of events difficult.

Karen Radner considers the most important sources for the conspiracies to be the letters SAA 10 179, SAA 10 377 and SAA 16 59–62. There are also a number of other letters, including texts from Babylonia, that appear to belong to the same context. The bulk of the known relevant material can be found translated and discussed in Martti Nissinen's References to Prophecy in Neo-Assyrian Sources (1998).

== Conspiracies ==
=== Early records of Sasî ===
Map of settlements mentioned in this article

The identity and origin of Sasî is not known. The earliest dateable reference to a person with this name who can be presumed to be the same individual is the letter SAA 10 112, written by Bel-ušezib in 675. Bel-ušezib was a Babylonian scholar who worked in Nineveh as an astronomer and diviner. Bel-ušezib kept Esarhaddon informed about divine omens in the stars and also wrote to him about treachery and schemes within the empire based information he received from his own network of informants. In SAA 10 112, Bel-ušezib wrote to the king to inform him that the son of Šumu-iddina, the governor of Nippur, had smuggled gold and other treasures from Babylonia. Šumu-iddina had then in turn given these to three people named Sasiya, Ṣillaya, and a third person whose name is not preserved. "Sasiya" is a Babylonian way to write the name Sasî. Šumu-iddina's son appears to have been arrested, though Bel-ušezib further informed Esarhaddon that he believed there was a plot against the king. Bel-ušezib believed Šumu-iddina to be part of this plot and also suspected Šarru-lu-dari, an Egyptian whose friends included Sasiya and a man named Bel-eṭir.

Further letters that concern Babylonian affairs of Sasî include CT 54 37 and CT 54 462. These cannot be dated with certainty but likely predate the later letters concerning conspiracies. CT 54 37 deals with the ousting of Ašaredu, the governor of Kutha, and mentions that three people loyal to Esarhaddon—"the horse-driver", "the governor of HAR" (perhaps Harran), and "Sasiya the mayor"—might be able to pick out witnesses for Ašaredu. CT 54 462 was written to Esarhaddon by a man named Marduk-naṣir and informed the king of the activities of Sasiya, Ereši, "Remanni-Adad the chariot driver", Nabû-uhašu, and "Bel-eṭir the governor of ...". These men had (in an unknown context) taken a fast chariot somewhere and were refusing the king's order to return this chariot. Remanni-Adad may be identical to a chariot driver of the same name who later held high office as charioteer for the crown prince (and later king) Ashurbanipal. Collectively, these letters suggest that Sasî was a man involved in suspicious activities, who associated with a man who may have been the governor of Harran and with the prominent chariot-driver Remanni-Adad.

As "Sasiya the mayor", Sasî is indicated to at some point have become the mayor of a city. He is also documented to have served as a high official in Esarhaddon's royal libraries in Nineveh, where he was responsible for the supervision of scholars. The conspiracies that Sasî was involved in, in particular his proclamation as king, might suggest that he had royal descent; Karen Radner has speculated that he could have been a descendant of Esarhaddon's grandfather, Sargon II.

=== Sasî is proclaimed king ===
At around the same time as Aššur-naṣir was victorious in Egypt, a second prophecy was made in Harran. This time it was spoken by a slave-girl, reported to have fallen into ecstasy, and sounded as follows: "This is the word of the god Nusku: Kingship belongs to Sasî. I shall destroy the name and the seed of Sennacherib!". The incident was reported to Esarhaddon in letters written by Nabû-rēhtu-uṣur, an official who may have been employed by Esarhaddon's mother Naqiʾa. Nabû-rēhtu-uṣur did not provide the name of the prophetess, only that she was a slave-girl (amtu) (Note: Amanda H. Podany suggested in 2022 that she may not actually have been a slave and that amtu could have been a defamatory designation added by Nabû-rēhtu-uṣur to delegitimize her prophecy.) owned by a man named Bel-ahu-uṣur who seems to have lived in Harran. Modern historians sometimes refer to her as the "Oracle of Nusku". She was reportedly "enraptured" in some way for three months, perhaps a sign of divine possession, and spoke the words directly as if she had been a mouthpiece for the god. The choice of god and location of the prophecy cannot have been coincidental. Nusku was in the Neo-Assyrian period seen as the son of Sin. The new prophecy was described as being spoken in the "outskirts of Harran", the same wording used in the texts that mention Esarhaddon's previous Harranian prophecy and thus perhaps the exact same place.

Nabû-rēhtu-uṣur was reluctant to accept the words of the prophetess as a genuine divine message, partly because they opposed the king and partly because she was not a professional prophetess. The message was treasonous, even if it came from a god, and provided ideological justification for a possible uprising against Esarhaddon. Nabû-rēhtu-uṣur still considered the prophecy to be so serious that his letters quoted recent oracles and prophecies that were more supportive of Esarhaddon. He was also convinced that Esarhaddon was in imminent danger and pleaded with him to destroy the conspirators and safeguard the lives of himself and the royal family. He suggested that the king should have an extispicy (the examination of an animal's entrails to ascertain messages from the gods) performed on a ram in order to determine whether the new prophecy had been truthful, hoping that it would demonstrate that the prophetess had faked the divine message. The prophetess had apparently been brought before the authorities by the guards though later placed herself under Sasî's protection. She is likely to have been a highly charismatic individual who played a key role in the spread of the conspiratorial movement; Sasî rapidly gained supporters in the empire and one letter (SAA 16 243) indicates that loyalty oaths may have begun to be sworn to him as if he was already king.

Nabû-rēhtu-uṣur made no suggestion to punish the prophetess since Esarhaddon's loyalty oath merely demanded the denunciation of false prophets, with only actual conspirators to be put to death. There are however records of plans to attempt to kidnap her from Sasî's residence. Nabû-rēhtu-uṣur suggested that Sasî and his associates should be interrogated and pleaded with Esarhaddon to stay in the safety of his palace. Personally, he hoped that the conspirators would be put to death, writing "may the name and seed of Sasî, Bel-ahu-uṣur, and their accomplices perish". In a second letter, Nabû-rēhtu-uṣur also informed the king of a vision of his own, though it is difficult to make out what he claims to have seen. He also mentioned that he believed Sasî was preparing an ambush to assassinate Esarhaddon.

The letters record several other names, both supposed associates of Sasî and loyalist informants. In most cases, little can be ascertained about these figures other than their allegiances as understood by Nabû-rēhtu-uṣur. Figures who he clearly marked as accomplices of Sasî in different letters include the aforementioned Bel-ahu-uṣur, "Issar-nādin-apli the scribe", Nabû-eṭir, "Awyanu the eunuch", Nabû-bel-[x], (Note: Full name not preserved.) and Ubru-Nabû. Ubru-Nabû may be identified with a person of the same name who appears in a document from 671 (SAA 6 296:5) as the keeper of rams, oxen, and donkeys of Remanni-Adad, charioteer of Ashurbanipal. Sasî also appears as a witness in this document. The names Milki-nuri and Urad-Issar are mentioned by Nabû-rēhtu-uṣur in unclear roles (due to broken off text) but also seem to be adherents of Sasî. Nabû-rēhtu-uṣur also mentioned a man named Ardâ who appears to be an informer and not a suspect, whom the authorities should talk to. Ardâ is also mentioned in another fragmentary letter, wherein he and a man named Adad-šumu-uṣur have informed the anonymous writer that "they are making a rebellion". Ardâ must have belonged to Sasî's inner circle since he appears to have been aware of Sasî's conversations and meetings on specific days. Alongside Ardâ and Adad-šumu-uṣur, the daughter of a man named Bambâ also seems to be mentioned by Nabû-rēhtu-uṣur as an informer.

=== Further reports ===
==== Nabû-ušallim ====
Nabû-ušallim was an official loyal to Esarhaddon who was known as an interpreter of dreams. In this role, he was consulted by Abdâ, the city overseer of Assur. Abdâ described a dream in which a child had handed him a staff and told him that he would achieve might and power. Nabû-ušallim confirmed that this dream suggested that Abdâ had dreamt of becoming king, possibly a prophetic message. Abdâ swiftly recruited 120 elite soldiers to his cause and made them swear allegiance to him in a formal ceremony. Some soldiers encouraged Nabû-ušallim to also swear loyalty to Abdâ. Despite being surrounded by rebels, he refused and remained loyal to Esarhaddon.

After Nabû-ušallim's refusal, the two leaders of this conspiracy, Abdâ and (interestingly) Sasî, hired two men to travel to Nineveh in order to convince Esarhaddon that it was actually Nabû-ušallim who was the traitor plotting against the king. A person presenting themself as a friend of Nabû-ušallim convinced him to write to the king and explain what had happened in order to clear his own name. Nabû-ušallim did so and gave the message to the supposed friend. This unnamed individual then betrayed him and instead delivered the message to Sasî, thereby informing Sasî of what Nabû-ušallim knew and preventing Esarhaddon from learning of Nabû-ušallim's loyalty. Soon after this, a more desperate Nabû-ušallim wrote to Esarhaddon again, likely fearing for his life from both the king and Sasî, retold the story, and tried to convince the king of his loyalty.

==== Kudurru ====
Kudurru was a Babylonian scribe, who alongside other scribes had been forcibly brought from Babylon to Nineveh, where they in captivity helped to copy clay tablets for the royal libraries. Kudurru might be the same person as a Kudurru who was deported to Assyria in 675/674 and was the son of Šamaš-ibni, a ruler of the Chaldean Bīt-Dakkūri tribe. The letter SAA 11 156 records that Kudurru and a fellow scribe, Kunaya, were under the supervision of Sasî. Esarhaddon in one letter directed his crown prince Ashurbanipal to interrogate Sasî, not concerning Sasî's own suspicious activities but instead those of Kudurru and Kunaya. It is possible that the other reports had not yet reached Esarhaddon; Kudurru wrote a letter to Esarhaddon in the same month as Nabû-rēhtu-uṣur reported his vision.

Although there are no records of Kunaya's activities, Kudurru had been swept up in the conspiracies against Esarhaddon. Kudurru wrote a letter (SAA 10 179) to Esarhaddon where he recounted his experiences. The chief cupbearer Nabû-killanni had sent a cohort commander to release Kudurru from his duties. This commander confirmed with Kudurru that Kudurru was an expert in scribal lore and together they traveled to Sin's temple in Harran. In the temple, Kudurru was first cross-examined by an unnamed questioner before the commander re-emerged and took him to an upper room, where four of the most powerful men in Assyria waited for him: Nabû-killanni, the chamberlain, the majordomo, and an unnamed official. The cohort commander also stayed in the room and another figure present, who Kudurru noted kept entering and leaving the room, was the "overseer of the city". (Note: There is no evidence that Sasî was an official of, or lived in, Harran. Martti Nissinen nevertheless speculated in 1998 that the city overseer mentioned here was none other than Sasî, who in other sources is attested as a mayor of an unspecified settlement. Abdâ, mentioned as a chief conspirator in Nabû-ušallim's letter, was also a city overseer.) Conspirators with ranks this high meant that they would have been able to make use of the Assyrian Empire's advanced state communication network, increasing the speed at which the movement could spread. Kudurru was given a seat in the room and drank wine together with the men until sunset. Then, the purpose of his presence was revealed. One of the men asked Kudurru if he was an expert in divination and then asked him to perform a divination for them. The question the men wished to be answered was "will the chief eunuch take the kingship?".

It is not clear who was chief eunuch at this time. It was either still Aššur-naṣir, who had led the army in Egypt, or another chief eunuch known to have served under Esarhaddon, Ša-Nabû-šû. Aššur-naṣir is usually considered more likely. It is also not clear what precisely the question entails. It is typically interpreted as suggesting that Aššur-naṣir also had plans to claim the throne; Karen Radner on the other hand interpreted it in 2003 as suggesting that Aššur-naṣir wished to contest Esarhaddon's rule and act as a kingmaker for another claimant. Kudurru could easily have ascertained that the men were not loyal to Esarhaddon; if they had been, they would have likely asked the question to one of the established diviners at the temple, not a Babylonian prisoner who coincidentally had some divination experience. It is probable that Sasî was involved in this scheme; as Kudurru's supervisor in the library he could even have suggested him for the work. Kudurru performed the divination as requested and announced that "he will take the kingship". The men were overjoyed at this and spent the next day "[making merry] until the sun was low", i.e. hosted a great party. Kudurru claimed that the men made increasingly outlandish promises to him for his service, including that he would be returned home and even that he would be made king of Babylon. (Note: A man named Kudurru later served as governor of Uruk under Ashurbanipal and may have been the progenitor of the Chaldean dynasty, which later ruled the Neo-Babylonian Empire. This is however likely not the same individual; Kudurru was a common name at the time. Whereas the Kudurru involved in the conspiracies against Esarhaddon is believed to have been the son of Šamaš-ibni of the Bīt-Dakkūri, the Kudurru of Uruk was likely the son of the high priest Nabû-nāṣir.)

According to Kudurru's letter, he had merely performed a charade and had continuously been on Esarhaddon's side. In his own words, the divination had been "but a colossal fraud" and "the only thing [I was th]inking of (was) 'may he not kill me'". Kudurru informed Esarhaddon of the plot, named the traitors, and noted that he feared for his life. Kudurru was afraid not only of the cupbearer and the chief eunuch, who might take revenge if they learnt that he had divulged their treason, but also from Esarhaddon, who might hear of his divination and deem him to be a traitor.

== Esarhaddon's response ==
Although the reports of Nabû-rēhtu-uṣur, Nabû-ušallim, and Kudurru differ in details of the conspiracies and even in who was the main royal candidate opposing Esarhaddon, the conspiracies mentioned are all clearly connected. In the case of these conspiracies, the paranoia of Esarhaddon and his loyalty oaths paid off. All three accounts reached the king and he was swiftly informed of traitors throughout the empire. At first, Esarhaddon did not move against the conspirators and instead gathered information. The reports must have left Esarhaddon unsure of what to believe, with divinations supporting various different candidates and apparent treason in the highest levels of the administration, perhaps within his own court. Fearing for his life, Esarhaddon performed the "substitute king" ritual again in late 671, less than three months after having completed the preceding hundred days of it. After this period of seclusion, Esarhaddon moved to take immediate action.

Using the extensive royal spy network, Esarhaddon had many of the reported conspirators rounded up and brought to Nineveh. This is recorded in a letter by his court physician Urad-Nanaya, who wrote that "Ashur and the great gods bound and handed over to the king these criminals who plotted against [his] goodness". This was followed by a massacre, the second conducted against Assyrian officials in Esarhaddon's reign. In 670, the Assyrian chronicle reads that "the king killed many of his magnates in Assyria with the sword". The conspiracies left Esarhaddon extremely suspicious; even those who had been uninvolved had to go to great lengths to convince him of their loyalty and security measures at the court were considerably strengthened. The chief eunuch was likely executed for his involvement in the conspiracies. Some conspirators escaped Esarhaddon's wrath. The letter SAA 10 316 mentions some conspirators still at large, including a "charioteer" and a "third man". This may be connected to the later letter ABL 1364, from Ashurbanipal's time as king, which records three officers executed by Esarhaddon: "Dadi-ibni the third man", "Šulmu-ereš the charioteer", and "Adad-remanni the weaver". A letter written by an official in the Esagila temple of Babylon also mentions eunuchs who escaped to Babylonia from Assyria and took refuge in Borsippa.

It is likely that Esarhaddon's massacres of high officials in the Assyrian administration caused more serious harm to the empire than would have been caused by his own death and replacement with a rival. Since the foundation of the movement appears to have been a fundamental challenge to Esarhaddon's divinely ordained legitimacy, no rebels could be spared. In Assyria, a limmu official was selected from among the high-ranking officials each year to give their name to the next year. After the massacre, no new limmu was selected for several months, indicating just how wide-ranging the purge was. This situation is extremely rare in Assyrian history. Excavations at settlements near Harran, such as Samʾal and Burmarina have shown that several houses were burnt down at around this time, likely connected to Esarhaddon's retribution.

The precise role played by Sasî himself in the conspiracies, and his fate, is not known. He was certainly deeply involved in the events, though it is not entirely clear which side he was on. Some documents that name a Sasî as a witness (sometimes with Remanni-Adad, the charioteer) are known from Ashurbanipal's reign, though this is not necessarily the same person. Most notably, the letter SAA 6 251 is dated to the year 666 and records as witnesses Sasî, Adad-šumu-uṣur, Issar-nādin-apli, and Nabû-rēhtu-uṣur, i.e. the names of supposed conspirators and the same men who accused them of treason. These are also however not necessarily the same people. Martti Nissinen suggested in 1998 that this indeed was the same Sasî and that he had either somehow convinced Esarhaddon of his loyalty, or that Sasî's involvement in the multiple conspiracies had been an intelligence operation and that he had actually been an infiltrator loyal to the king, keeping Esarhaddon informed of the actions of the conspirators. In 2003, Karen Radner wrote that she found Nissinen's speculation to be "unnecessarily convoluted". Deeming the later Sasî to be a different person, Radner found it likely that both Sasî and the prophetess who had proclaimed him king were either executed or escaped abroad into exile.
