= HMS Atalante (1808) =

Sloop of the Royal Navy

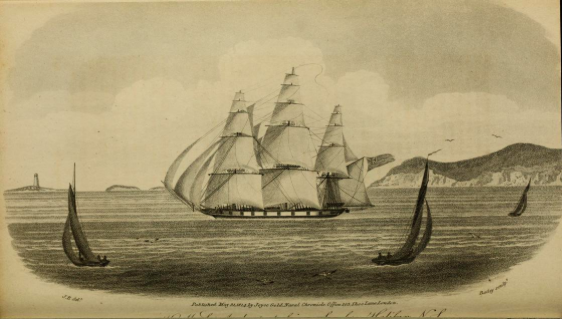
- HMS Atalante passing Sambro, Nova Scotia by W. E. Bailey

History

United Kingdom
- Name: Atalante
- Ordered: 26 April 1806
- Builder: Goodrich, or Robert Shedden, Bermuda
- Launched: August 1808
- Fate: Wrecked 10 November 1813

General characteristics
- Class & type: Bermuda-class ship-sloop
- Tons burthen: 39931/94 (bm)
- Length: Overall:107 ft 0 in (32.6 m); Keel:83 ft 10 5/8 in (25.6 m)
- Beam: 29 ft 11 in (9.1 m)
- Depth of hold: 14 ft 8 in (4.5 m)
- Complement: 121
- Armament: 2 × 9-pounder guns + 16 × 24-pounder carronades
- Notes: All dimensions are per design; there are no records for the "as built" dimensions

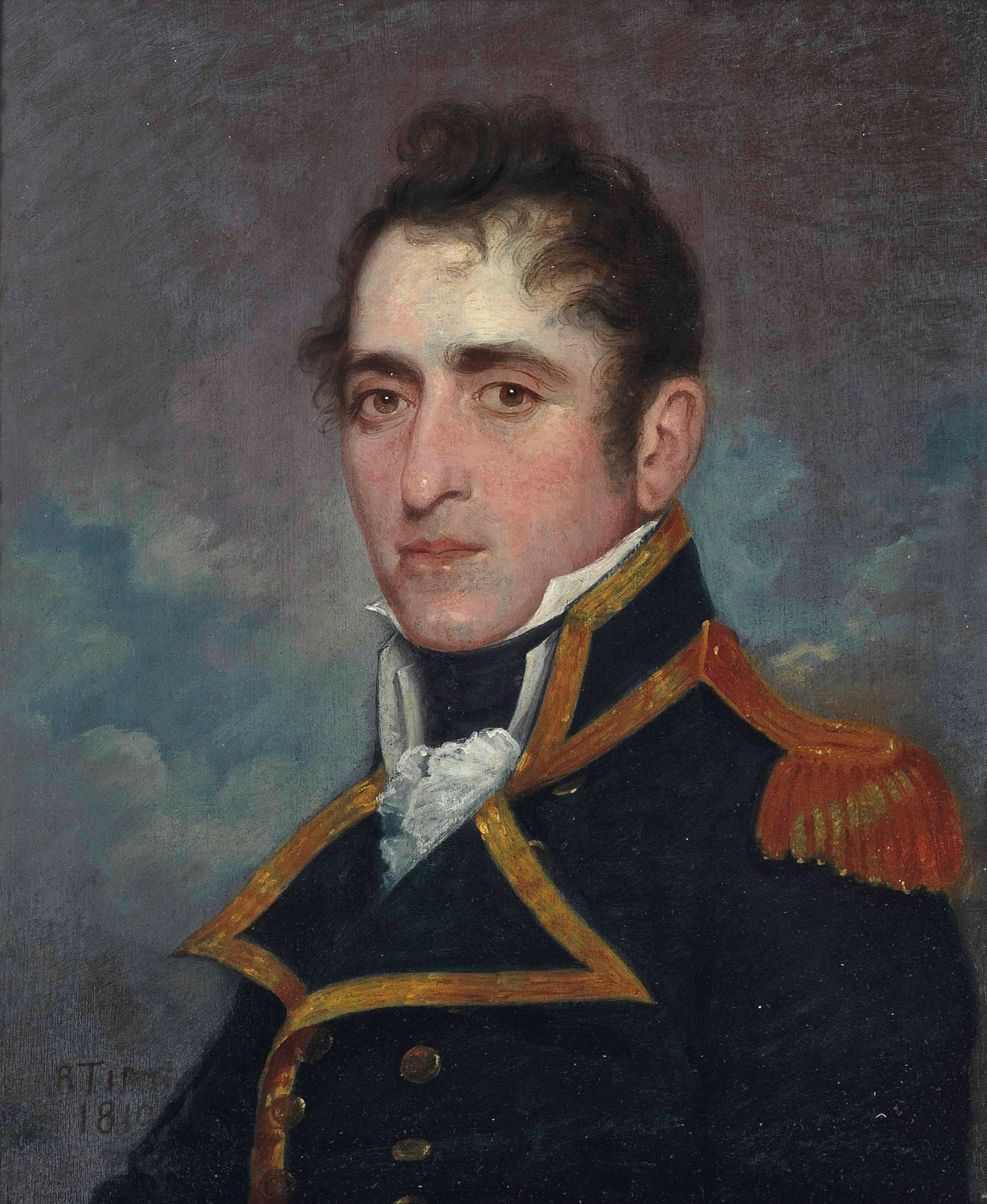
Captain Frederick Hickey R.N. (1775–1840) (circle of Gilbert Stuart)

HMS Atalante (or Atalanta) was an 18-cannon sloop-of-war launched in 1808, and ordered in 1806, from Bermuda. However, the ship was wrecked on 10 November 1813, caused by fog off Halifax, Nova Scotia.

== Career ==
Atalanta and Driver shared the Prince Regent's grant of three-quarters of the net value of Mercede, which one or both had captured on 16 August 1810.

On 10 July 1812, Atalanta captured a vessel of 359 tons (bm). She had been carrying wine, brandy, silks, and sundries from Civitavchia to Salem. The London Gazette gave the vessel's name as Marquis Somnielos. The Vice admiralty court in Halifax, Nova Scotia, gave her name as Marquis de Somerlous, with T. Moriarty, master. (Note: She may have become HMS Magnet.)

On 31 July 1812 Atalante captured Perseverance. (Note: A first-class share of the prize money was worth £471 1s 4d; a sixth-class share, that of an ordinary seaman, was worth £9 10s 1d.)

In July false reports circulated in the press that Atalante had captured the French ship Entreprenante, of superior force.

On 12 December 1812 Atalante captured the brig Tulip, of 150 tons (bm), James McCullouh, master. Tulip was sailing from Philadelphia to Bordeaux with a cargo of cotton, rice, and codfish. she arrived at Halifax, Nova Scotia, on 2 January 1813. By one report Tulip was a letter of marque.

In February 1813 reports started circulating that the British ships in Halifax would not fight American frigates. The petty officers of Orpheus and Atalante presented Hickey with a letter affirming their willingness to fight.

On 13 April Atalante arrived at Liverpool, Nova Scotia, from a cruise off New York. She had three United States schooners and a sloop in tow. The four prizes had been on voyages from Charleston, South Carolina to the northern United States with cargoes consisting primarily of cotton and indigo. The three schooners were, by date of capture:

- 31 March: Rising Sun, schooner of 99 tons (bm) and eight men, G.F. Fash, master. She was carrying 250 bales of cotton and 23 kegs of groundnuts.
- 1 April: President, schooner of 93 tons (bm) and eight men, G.W. Carr, master. She was carrying 212 bales of cotton and some indigo to Providence, Rhode Island.
- 2 April: Centurion, schooner of 56 tons (bm) and three men, C. Blanchard, master. She was carrying 120 bales of cotton to Providence, Rhode Island.

Also on 2 April Atalante captured the American ship Fame, carrying sundries, and sent her to Halifax. However the Vice-admiralty Court's records do not list her, suggesting that Fame may have been recaptured or lost.

On 23 April Atalante and the privateer Crown Solomon captured the brig Sibae, of 115 tons (bm), R. Carter, master. Sibae was sailing from Savannah to Boston with 301 bales of cotton. She appears in the London Gazette as Lilae (or Lilac), with a crew of seven men.

Atalanta was among the vessels sharing in the proceeds of the Spanish brig St. Iago and cargo captured on 11 June, (Note: A first-class share was worth £49 11s 1d; a sixth-class share was worth 9s 10d.) and the American schooner Surveyor captured the next day. The same ships shared in the compromise for the American ships Governor Strong and cargo (12 June), Emily and cargo (12 June), and Star and cargo (14 June). (Note: A first-class share was worth £282 12s 11d; a sixth-class share was worth £2 15s 11d.) Lastly, she was among the vessels sharing in the proceeds of the American ship Herman and cargo (21 June). (Note: A first-class share was worth £47 13s 4d; a sixth-class share was worth 7s 6d.)

On 10 August 1813 Atalante arrived in Halifax with the news that as HMS Plantagenet was moored near Norfolk, Virginia, United States, forces attempted to destroy her with torpedoes built to Robert Fulton's specifications. The attempts failed.

On 6 September, Captain Oliver of Valiant sent Acasta and Atalante up Long Island Sound "to endeavour to annoy the enemy". They returned five days later, having taken and destroyed fifteen small vessels, most of which they burnt as the vessels were in ballast.

== Loss ==
Atalante was under the command of Captain Frederick Hickey and had 133 passengers and crew, when she wrecked on the Sisters Rocks off Halifax on 10 November 1813.

Atalante had been returning to Halifax to re-provision when on 8 November she sighted Cape Sable before a heavy fog settled on the area. She proceeded slowly until when on the morning of 10 November Captain Hickey judged she was off Halifax. She started firing signal guns at regular intervals and took answering gunshots as being from the Sambro Lighthouse. She steered towards the guns, but sighted breakers too late to be able to escape striking the rocks.

One crew member of the Atalante later reported,

In twelve minutes she was literally torn to pieces; the crew swam to the boats; and to see so many poor souls struggling for life, some naked, others on spares, casks, or anything tenable, was a scene painful beyond description ... To the honour of Captain Hickey, he was the last who left the wreck; his calmness, his humanity, and his courage, during the entire of this awful scene, was super to man: every thing is lost but our lives." (In fact there is an obituary for one crew member reported to have died in the sinking.)

A local fishing vessel discovered the passengers in three small vessels stranded in the fog and guided them to safety at Portuguese Cove, Nova Scotia. Captain Hickey reported, the "inhabitants of Portuguese cove behaved towards us all with every possible mark of hospitality, kindness, and attention, that humanity could dictate."

The passengers included twenty American refugee slaves from the James River, who were among the first of the Black Refugees of the War of 1812 to reach Canada.

The subsequent courtmartial determined that the guns Atalante had heard were not from the lighthouse but rather from another vessel lost in the fog.

== See also ==
- Military history of Nova Scotia
