= Baltazara Chuiza =

Ecuadorian rebel

Baltazara Chuiza was an Indigenous woman, originally from Guano, who, together with her sister Manuela Chuiza, led a rebellion in Ecuador against the Spanish in 1778. She was eventually captured, and executed.
