= Lorenza Avemanay =

Lorenza Avemanay (also Lorenza Avemanay Tacuri) (1747-1803 CE) was an indigenous Ecuadorian who led an 1803 revolt against the Spanish occupation in Guamote. She was later captured and executed by the Spanish authorities.
