= Oracle of Nusku =

Assyrian prophetess

The oracle of Nusku was a slave-girl from the outskirts of Harran who lived at the time of the late Neo-Assyrian Empire and was heavily involved in the Sasî movement, which aimed to depose the king Esarhaddon. In 671 BC she claimed to receive a divine message from the god Nusku that the Assyrian official Sasi was to become king and that Esarhaddon and his family were to be destroyed. The oracle placed herself under the protection of Sasi, became a leading figure of a conspiracy to seat him on the throne and continued to speak in support of him. Sasi's rapid gain of supporters, including influential figures in the imperial administration, is probably attributable to the great personal charisma of the oracle.

The conspirators were defeated through some means in 670 BC and Sasi and the oracle were presumably captured and executed. Though they did not dethrone Esarhaddon, Esarhaddon's subsequent great massacre of officials and generals loyal to Sasi may have been a major contributing factor to the fall of the Assyrian Empire less than a century later.

== Biography ==
The oracle was a slave-girl from the outskirts of the city of Harran. At the time of making her prophecy concerning Sasi she belonged to a man named Bel-ahu-usur. She was not actually a professional prophetess nor employed in a temple. The name of the oracle is not known; surviving documents simply refer to her as the "slave-girl of Bel-ahu-usur" or the "maid-servant from the House of Sasi".

In 671 BC, shortly after Esarhaddon successfully conquered Egypt, the oracle claimed to have received a divine message from the god Nusku and proclaimed Sasi as the king of Assyria, ecstatically uttering the prophecy "This is the word of the god Nusku: Kingship belongs to Sasi. I shall destroy the name and the seed of Sennacherib!". The oracle thus spoke the supposed words of Nusku directly, unlike most other prophecies and as if she was being possessed by the god and acted as his mouthpiece.

Sasi was an Assyrian official and may have been a descendant of one of the earlier Assyrian kings. The oracle is believed to have uttered the prophecy in the vicinity of Harran, probably inside a temple. The Assyrian court official Nabu-rehtu-usur quickly reported the prophecy to Esarhaddon and advised him to verify the accuracy of the prophecy, particularly since it had been spoken by a non-professional and that there had also been prophecies from other deities more supportive of Esarhaddon's reign. Nevertheless, as the supposed word of a god, the prophecy was concerning and it was particularly threatening for Esarhaddon since his conquest of Egypt had also been prophesied by an oracle in Harran, lending prophecies from the city a certain degree of trustworthiness.

Esarhaddon was unable to bring the oracle to court since she placed herself under the protection of Sasi, who was at Harran at the time. The oracle remained by Sasi's side throughout the duration of their conspiracy as one of the two key figures of their planned uprising. Sasi gained powerful supporters and followers throughout the Assyrian Empire over a very short period of time; the personal charisma of the oracle was probably instrumental in his rapid rise in power. Assyrian documents state that she continued to be "enraptured" and speak good words of Sasi following her initial prophecy. Esarhaddon was aware of her importance to the conspiracy and is recorded to have engaged in unsuccessful plots to kidnap her.

The conspirators were defeated through some means in 670 BC and large numbers of Assyrian officials and magnates who had supported Sasi were captured and executed. Unless they were able to escape abroad, The oracle and Sasi may have been captured and executed at this time.

== Impact ==
Although the conspiracy was unsuccessful in dethroning Esarhaddon, it left a large mark both on Esarhaddon personally and on the fate of the Assyrian Empire. Esarhaddon was left more suspicious and paranoid than previously and is known to more frequently have consulted prophecies after 670 BC. The aftermath of the Sasi conspiracy also marked the second massacre of capable officials and generals conducted in Esarhaddon's reign; a lack of such officials and later failures in replacing them may have been one of the major reasons for the fall of the Assyrian Empire in the late 7th century BC.
