= José Antonio Aponte =

Leader of Aponte Conspiracy

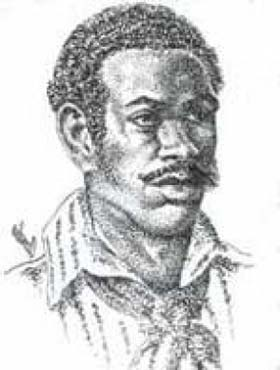
- A sketch of Aponte
- Born: 1760; San Cristobal de la Habana, (Cuba)
- Died: April 9, 1812 (aged 51–52); Havana, (Cuba)
- Cause of death: Execution by hanging

José Antonio Aponte, often known as "Black" José Aponte, (died April 9, 1812, in Havana) was a Cuban political activist and military officer of Yoruba origin who organized one of the most prominent slave rebellions in Cuba, the Aponte Conspiracy of 1812. He held the rank of first corporal (cabo primero) in Havana's black militia, and was the leader of his local Yoruba association. Aponte, a free black carpenter in Havana, was proclaimed to be the leader of a plot to rebel against the Cuban government, free the slaves and uplift free blacks, and overthrow slavery in Cuba. The movement struck several sugar plantations on the outskirts of Havana, but it was soon crushed by the government.

Aponte created a book of drawings that is claimed to have been the blueprints for the rebellion of 1812, for which he was convicted along with eight of his cohorts. He was eventually caught and hanged on April 9, 1812. He was then decapitated, and his head was placed in an iron cage and showcased in front of the house where he lived, with his hand going on display in another street.

== Background ==
Although historians are not certain of his exact birth date, it is estimated that Aponte was born around 1760 in Havana, Cuba. There are gaps in knowledge regarding his family and upbringing; the name of his mother is unknown and details about his childhood and adolescence are not recorded in many dominant narratives about him. However, Aponte included several family members in his book of drawings, two of the most important being his father and grandfather.

His grandfather, Joaquín Aponte worked his way up the military hierarchy eventually becoming captain of the grenadiers and serving for 43 years in the free black militia in Havana. Despite Aponte glorifying images of his father, Nicolás Aponte, as a military figure there are no military records corroborating this. As a descendant of this legacy, he too joined the free black militia of Havana. In the militia, Aponte participated in capturing the Bahamas from the British, and became a first corporal in the Militia Battalion of Mixed Mulattos and Blacks.

Aponte also taught himself about politics and history, as well as world cultures. He was well versed in African and Creole languages and history. He had a small library of twelve books, some of which included Aesop's Fables, a guide to Rome, and a history of Ethiopia. Furthermore, he was a liaison between Havana's different political and social groups, such as the African cabildos and white Freemasonry. There is debate about the validity of his Yoruba origin, Shango priesthood, Ogboni society membership, and Lucumi Cabildo membership; however, there is a consensus that Aponte was a wood sculptor, painter, and master carpenter.

== Aponte's Rebellion ==
In Cuba, in the late eighteenth century, there were numerous rebellions led by people of color and slaves; in 1812, Aponte continued this legacy as he organized one of the most prominent revolts in Cuba, known as Aponte's Rebellion of 1812. In the 19th century, as Cuba became more of a plantation society due to the sugar boom, a massive importation of slaves by the government transformed Cuban society by dividing social class more by racial lines. This may have reduced the rights of people of African descent, but it set the stage for more unity among both free and enslaved people of African descent for rebellion. Thus, Aponte was motivated to lead a mass insurrection to abolish slavery, overthrow the colonial tyranny, and create an independent society free of discrimination. Aponte assembled a group of slaves and people of color to plan and burn sugar mills, attack the armories in Havana, and arm 400 men he amassed in order to revolt and overthrow the slavery system. However, the government violently crushed the revolt, and hanged Aponte and some of his comrades on April 9, 1812. As a warning against future slave insurrections, Aponte's severed head was displayed in an iron cage at the entrance of Havana. The Cuban government thought the legal status of free people of color—being distinctly different from slaves—would be enough to stop solidarity. They were shocked when free people of color participated in Aponte's rebellion because they thought free slaves would be loyal to the government.

Aponte's rebellion was a movement that encompassed rebels burning plantations and killing whites in Havana and Puerto Príncipe, although the conspirators were captured by authorities before they could fulfill their plans in Bayamo and Holguín. There is pushback against the narrative of Aponte being the sole leader of the rebellion of 1812; some historians claim that the movement was decentralized with multiple leaders with congregant leadership, since there were various ethnic groups enslaved on the island.

== Book of paintings ==
When authorities searched Aponte's place of residence they found a book of paintings and plan made by Aponte. According to Spanish officials, the book of drawings contained maps of streets and military garrisons in Cuba, pictures of black soldiers beating whites, sketches of his father and grandfather, a drawing of George Washington, portraits of black kings, and episodes in Aponte's own life. After interrogating Aponte, colonial officials asserted that he used the book of drawings as a blueprint for the revolution to illustrate and explain his plans for the rebellion, considering he allegedly showed the book to members of the free black militia and numerous others during meetings at his house. It is proposed that he used images of black revolutionaries (like Toussaint L'Ouverture, Jean-Jacques Dessalines, and Henri Christoph) and drew inspiration from the Haitian Revolution to inspire his followers. Because of Aponte's book of paintings, the officials declared José Antonio Aponte the leader of the island-wide rebellion.

Unfortunately the book of paintings was lost, and the only knowledge we have about it is through the description Aponte gave to authorities while being interrogated. Many scholars and historians have debated the role of Aponte's book of paintings. Some consider his work a political and pedagogical tool, and highlight its recovery of the knowledge of the western Ethiopians to celebrate Africa's future in universal history. Others think that Aponte wanted the book to be read as a meditation on black sovereignty, an intellectual and subversive representation of imagining a black kingdom—one in which he was trying to create in Cuba. In addition, it can be seen as a remnant of intellectual history of the Black Atlantic, as a source for exploring the worldview of a black artist and revolutionary.

== Legacy ==
Aponte's legacy has been both marred and celebrated throughout history, within different cultures. The Aponte Rebellion has been regarded as an important event in Cuban history, but in the nineteenth century efforts the Cuban government attempted to pathologize Aponte as a wicked person, which is how his name became linked to the popular Cuban phrase "worse than Aponte." A popular scholar in the late nineteenth century, Francisco Calcagno painted Aponte as a nightmare of black rule, at the expense of the destruction of white civilization. However, Fernando Ortiz—a renowned Cuban anthropologist and influential Cuban social scientist of the twentieth century—regarded Aponte's Rebellion as a strong commitment on the part of slaves to gain their freedom, and thus validated the importance of the rebellion for Cuba's past, allowing scholars to shift the narratives about Aponte.

Black scholars and intellectuals have seized upon the image of Aponte and his movement to assert the important role of Afro-Cubans in their country's past, while revolutionaries have referenced Aponte as a model of insurrection against injustice and systemic prejudice. The Cuban government's anti racism organization founded in 2009 and formerly known as the Comisión de lucha Contra el Racismo y la Discriminación, was renamed La Comisión José Antonio Aponte (CJAP) de la UNEAC after Aponte. Most recently, Aponte has also been re-imagined as a national figure in Cuba, following a 2012 bicentennial that commemorated his death at the hands of colonial authorities.
