= Aponte conspiracy =

1812 slave revolt in Cuba

Cuban slaves rebellion
- Part of Spanish American wars of independence
Date	March 27, 1811 – March 11, 1812
Location	Western Cuba
Result	Spanish government victory: Conspiracy leaders executed

Belligerents
Spanish Empire: Captaincy General of Cuba	Cuban rebels

Commanders and leaders
(Spanish Empire) Ferdinand VII (Spanish Empire) Juan O'Donojú (Spanish Empire) Miguel de la Torre	José Antonio Aponte (executed); Manuel de Zequeira; Francisco de Arango; José Agustín Caballero; José Núñez de Cáceres

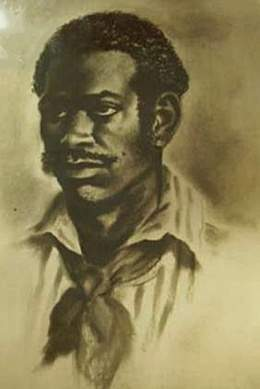
José Antonio Aponte Ulabarra

The Aponte conspiracy (also known as the Aponte rebellion) was a large-scale slave rebellion in Cuba that occurred in 1812. It is named after its alleged leader, José Antonio Aponte.

== Precedents ==
Due to the increase in use of slavery in Cuban society in the beginning of the 19th century, looking to secure the place left by Haiti as the major producer of sugar in the world, there were a series of conspiratorial attempts organized to abolish slavery. One that stood out among these occurred in 1795, where the first abolitionist conspiracy was discovered in Bayamo headed by the freedman Nicolás Morales, who when accused, fled and hid himself in Yareyal, near Holguín.

== Conspiracy ==
In the year 1808, Napoleon's invasion of Spain and the arrival of falsehoods around the theme of slavery caused a risky resolution on behalf of the creoles in favor of abolition. Then in 1811, in Havana, a new abolitionist conspiracy was created by the freedman José Antonio Aponte and his reaches spread all the way to Sancti Spíritus, Trinidad, Camagüey, Bayamo, Holguín and Santiago in Cuba. The person who tied the western conspiracy to the eastern part of the country was Hilario Herrera, a brave Dominican man with a deeply anti-slavery consciousness and an excellent clandestine organizer. On 11 March 1812, when the plot had exploded in Camagüey, Bayamo denounced the existence of a conspiratorial group in Holguín. As a result of the investigation, more than 50 people were apprehended and at the end of the trial, the local leader was sentenced to death by hanging, a man by the name of Juan Nepomuceo who originally came from the Congo. His companions Federico, Antonio, Miguel and Manuel were all given life sentences.

== Connections ==
Recently, a book by Dr. Juan Antonio Hernández titled Hacia una historia de lo imposible: la revolución haitiana y el libro de pinturas de José Antonio Aponte won the Mención Especial del Premio "Casa de las Américas" 2008, in the Social History Essay category.

The record of the declarations of José Antonio Aponte with the motive of his judicial accusation can be found edited online on the website of the Laboratorio de Desclasificación Comparada: Anales de desclasificación I:2; dossier "José Antonio Aponte y su Libro de Pinturas".
