= Capitol of Puerto Rico =

Seat of Legislative Assembly of Puerto Rico

- Capitolio de Puerto Rico
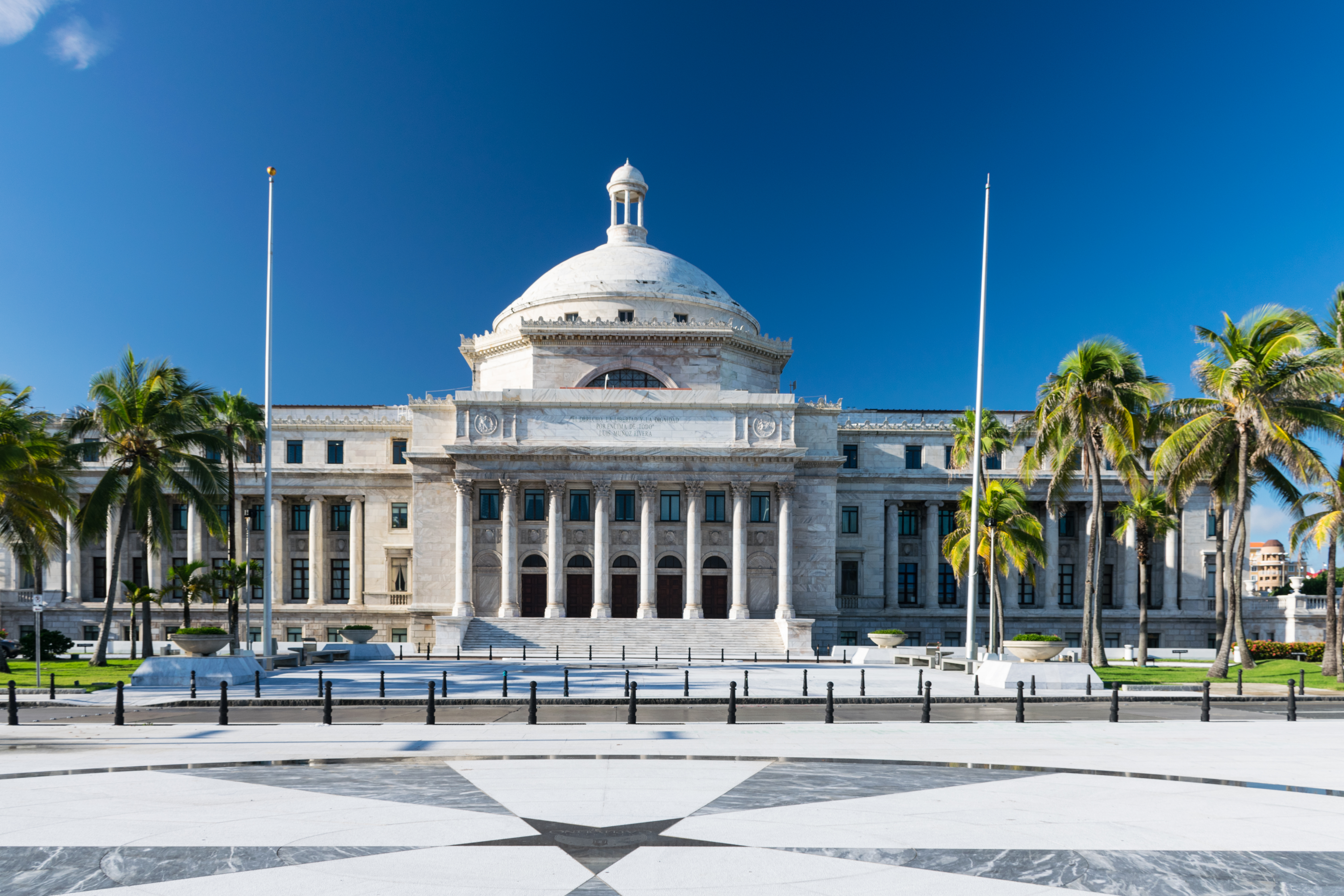
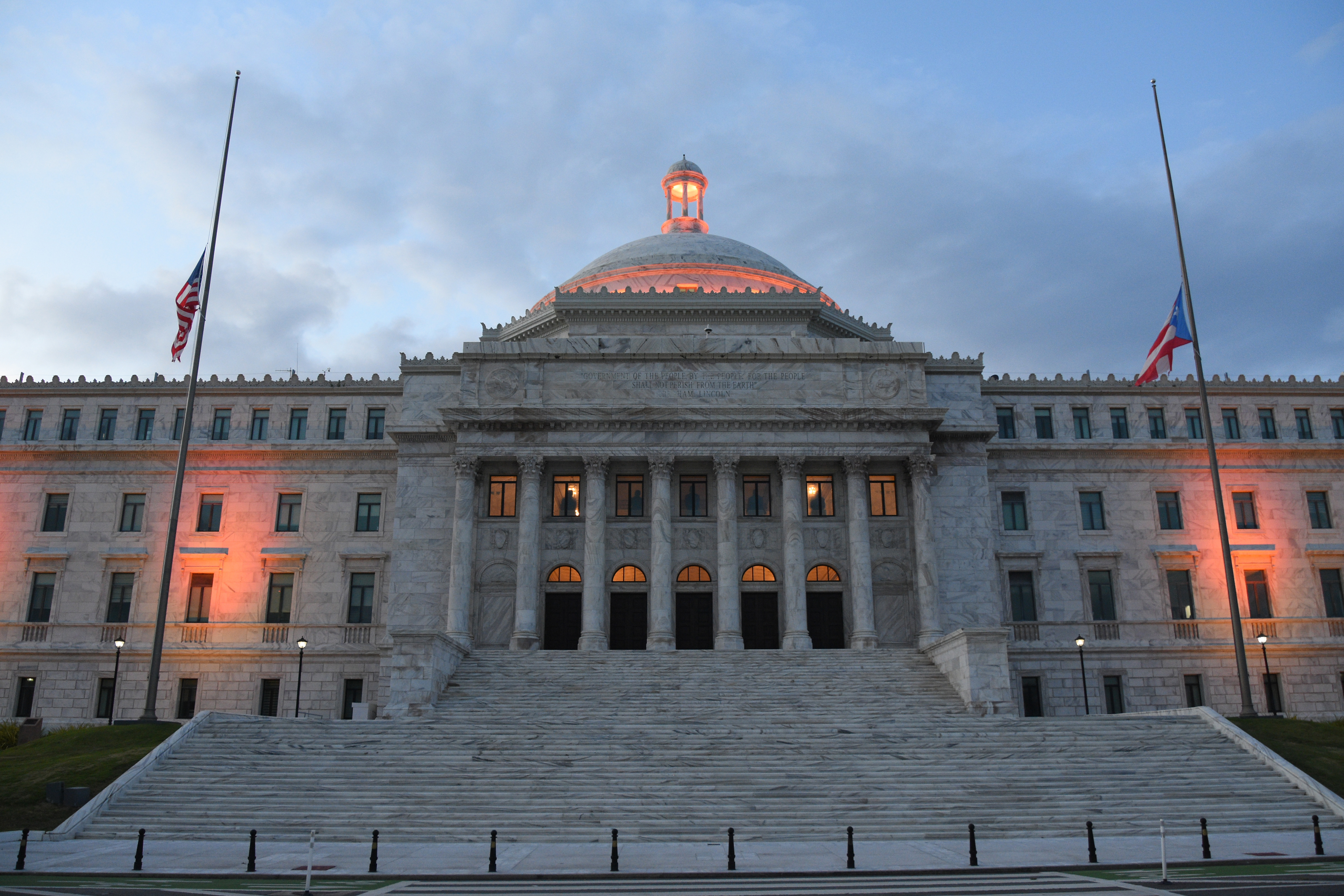
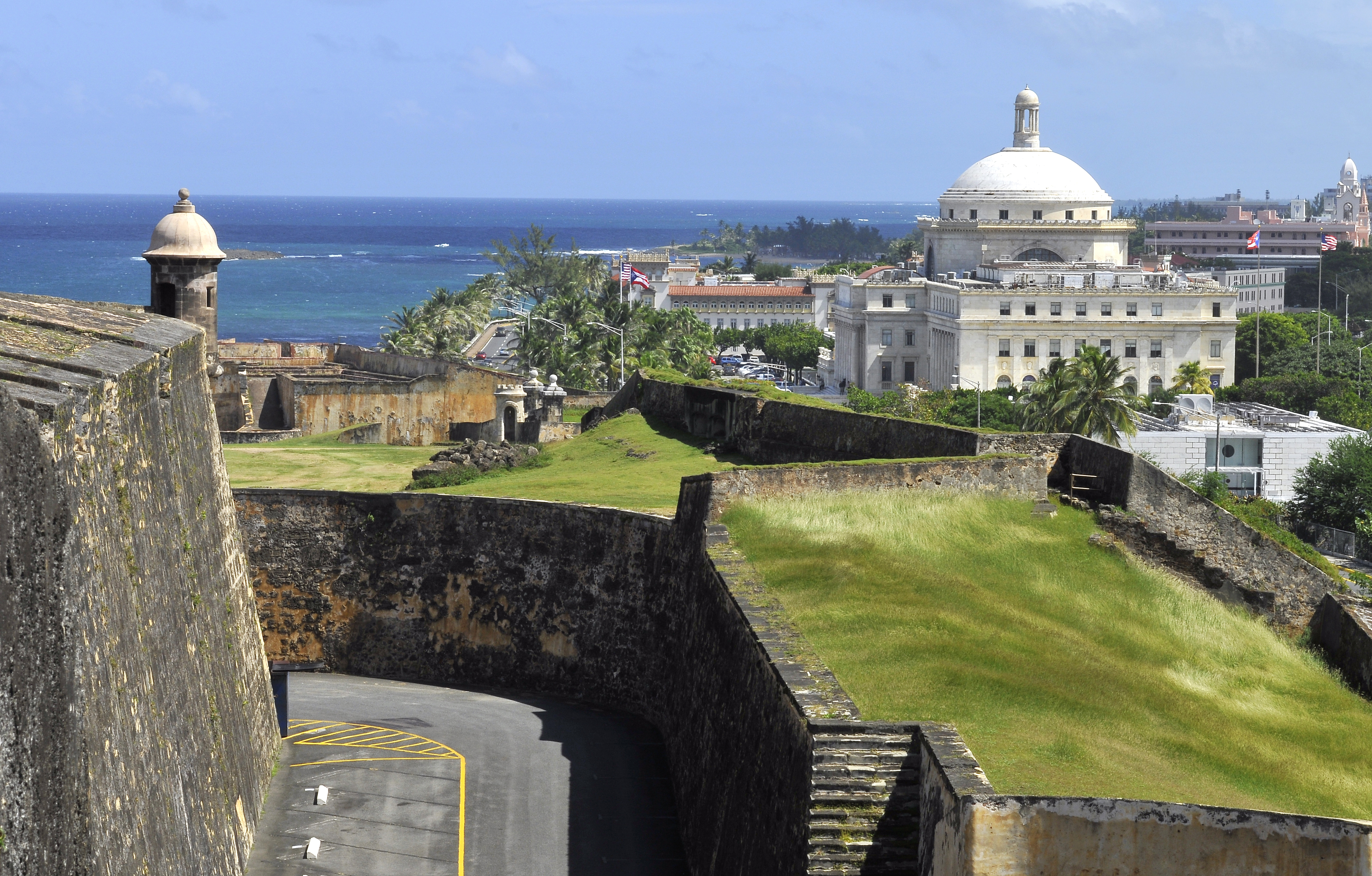
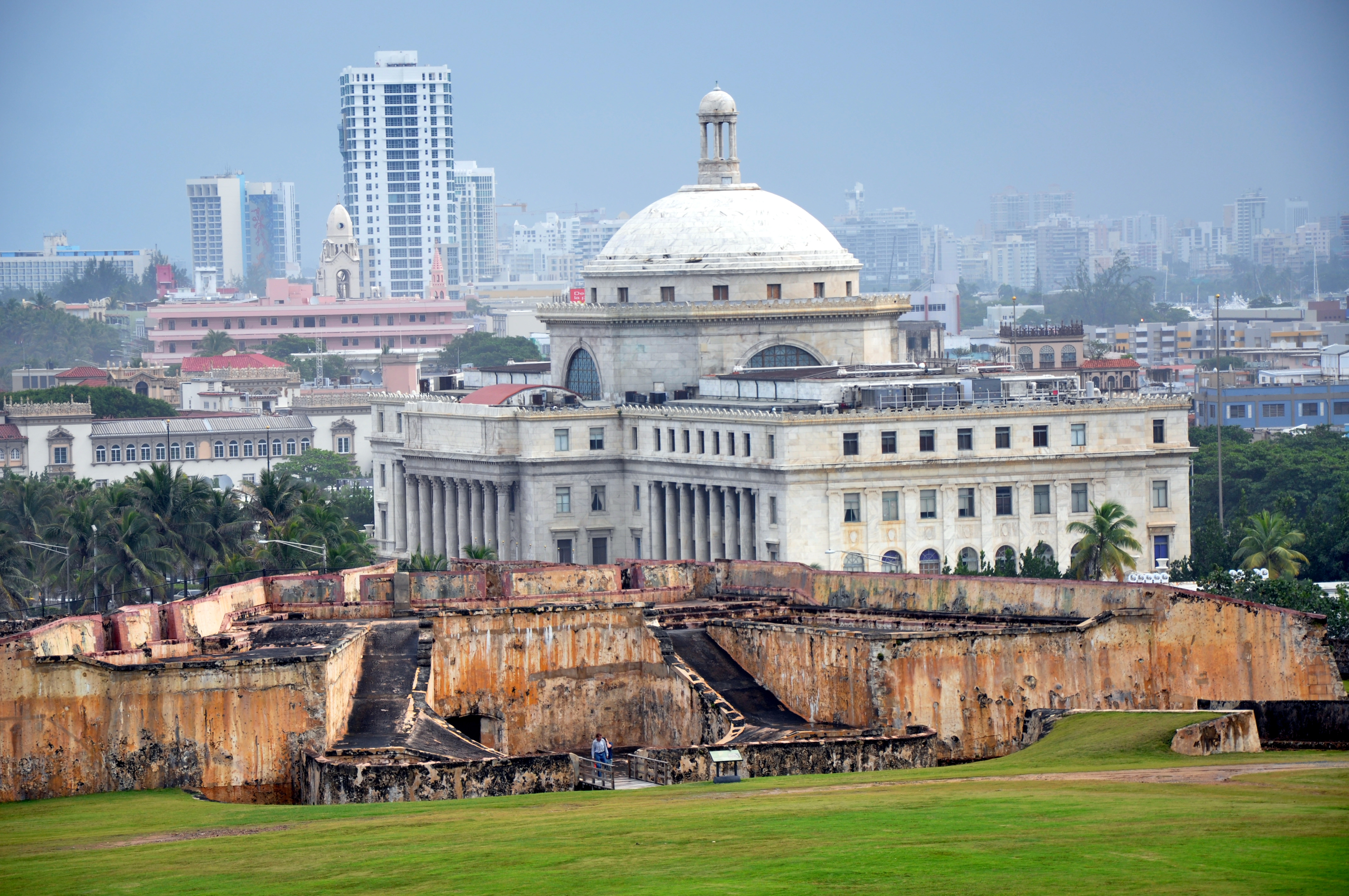
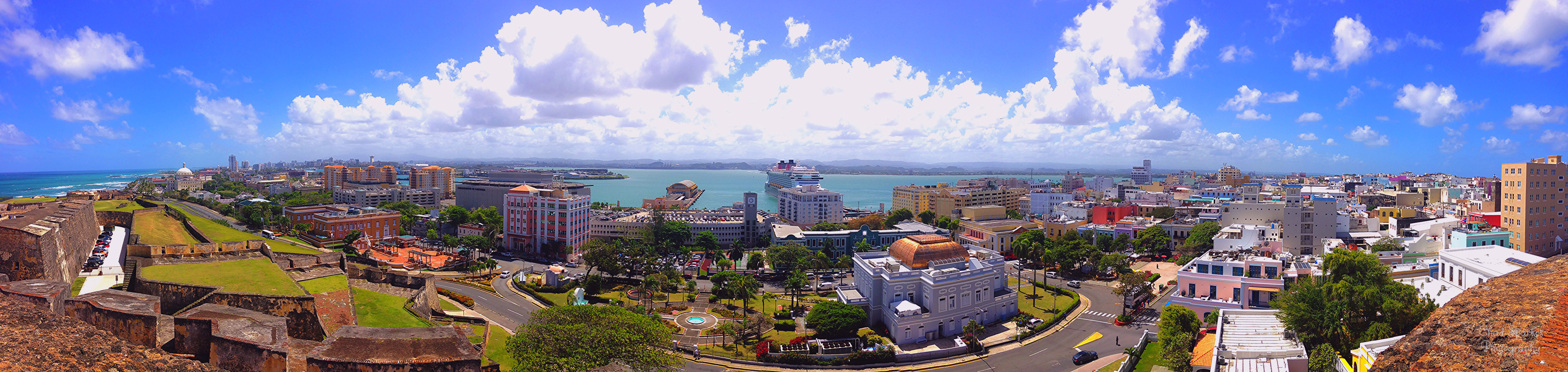
- From top, left to right: Main façade (north) of the Capitol from Plaza San Juan Bautista through Plaza de la Democracia on Luis Muñoz Rivera Avenue; rear façade (south) of the Capitol on Juan Ponce de León Avenue; northwestern views of the Capitol from San Cristóbal fortress; and view of San Juan Islet with Captitol in center (far left) overlooking Old San Juan, San Juan Bay, Puerta de Tierra, and Condado in Santurce
- Interactive map
- Alternative names: El Capitolio; Casa de las Leyes; Palacio de las Leyes

General information
- Type: Legislature
- Architectural style: Neoclassical, Beaux-Arts architecture
- Location: Avenida Ponce de León and Avenida Muñoz Rivera, San Juan, Puerto Rico, 1 Plaza de la Democracia, San Juan, PR, 00901
- Coordinates: 18°28′1″N 66°6′21″W
- Construction started: 1921
- Completed: 1929
- Inaugurated: February 11, 1929; 97 years ago

Technical details
- Floor area: 51,814 sq ft (4,813.7 m^{2})

Design and construction
- Architect: Rafael Carmoega
- El Capitolio de Puerto Rico
- U.S. National Register of Historic Places
- U.S. Historic district – Contributing property
- Part of: Puerta de Tierra (ID100002936)
- NRHP reference No.: 77001555

Significant dates
- Added to NRHP: November 18, 1977
- Designated CP: October 15, 2019

The Capitol of Puerto Rico (Spanish: Capitolio de Puerto Rico), most commonly known as El Capitolio (The Capitol), is the seat of the Legislative Assembly of Puerto Rico, a bicameral legislature composed of a Senate and a House of Representatives, responsible for the legislative branch of the government in the archipelago and island. Located in San Juan Islet, immediately outside the city walls of the Old San Juan historic quarter in the capital city and municipality of San Juan, the ocean and bayfront, white marble-cladded edifice was built in the Neoclassical Beaux-Arts style between 1921 and 1929. Architect Rafael Carmoega designed the building to resemble the Pantheon in Rome, using as inspiration the Low Memorial Library in New York City. It is part of the U.S. National Register of Historic Places since 1977.

Situated in the center of San Juan Islet in the Puerta de Tierra historic district overlooking the Atlantic Ocean in the north and San Juan Bay in the south from an elevated point, the Capitol is about 1 mile (1.6 km) from both La Fortaleza, seat of the executive branch, in the Old San Juan historic quarter in the western end of the Islet, and the Supreme Court Building, seat of the judicial branch, in the eastern end of the Islet in Puerta de Tierra. The Court and Capitol are directly connected via Luis Muñoz Rivera Avenue in the north and Juan Ponce de León Avenue in the south, both of which are directly linked to La Fortaleza via San Francisco Street in the north and Fortaleza Street in the south.

The Capitol of Puerto Rico has three combined characteristics unique in the world: the ceiling of its dome is decorated with mosaics, its exterior is cladded with marble, and its main façade is next to and faces the Atlantic Ocean.

== History ==
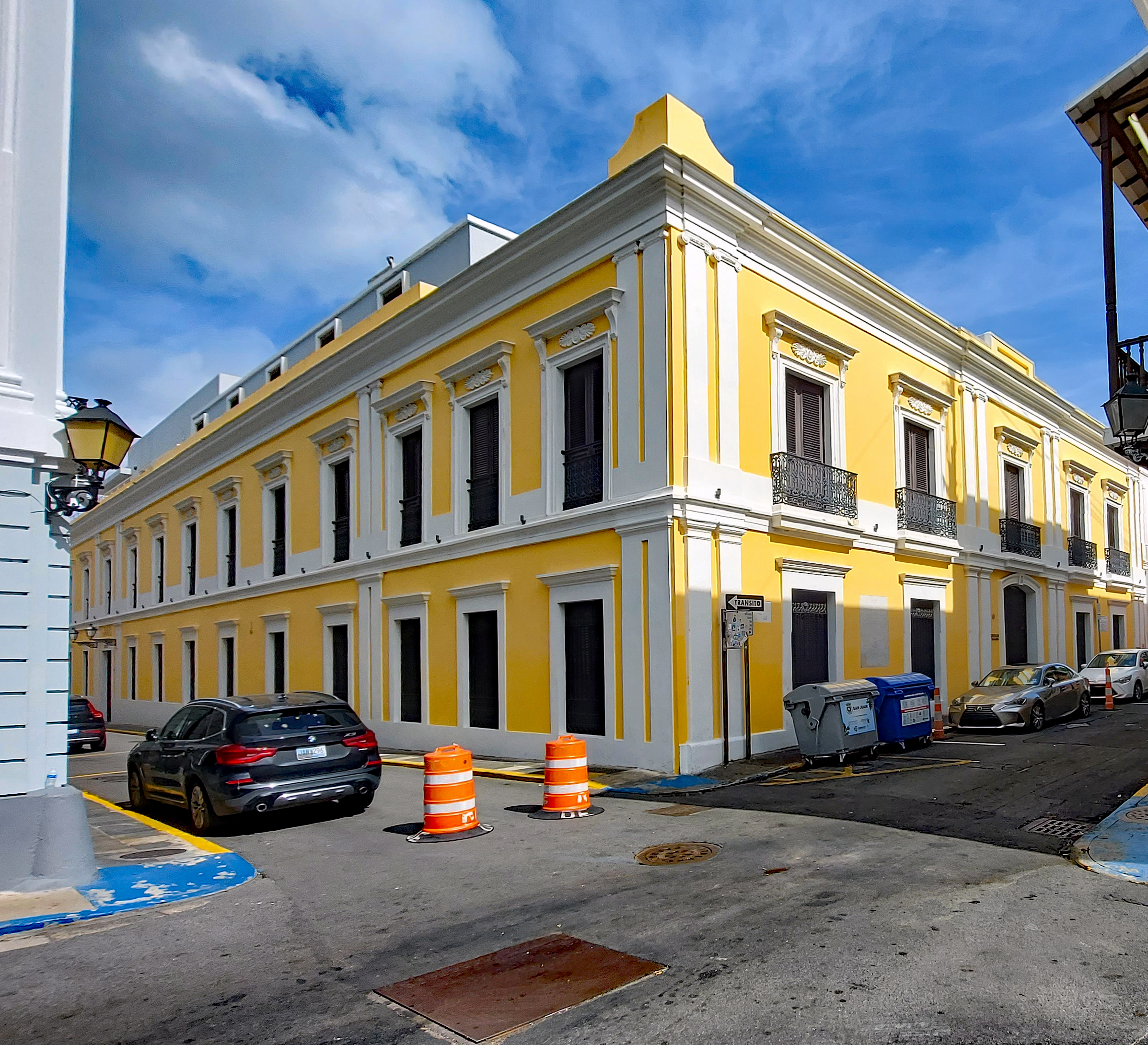
Palace of the Deputation in Old San Juan historic district, former seat of the Legislative Assembly, 2024

Originally symbolizing self-governance in Puerto Rico as a territory of the U.S. under an insular government of elected Puerto Rican delegates and appointed American officials established by the Foraker Act of 1900, the construction of the Capitol was first introduced by autonomy supporter and Resident Commissioner Luis Muñoz Rivera in 1907. Prior to the Capitol, the Legislative Assembly convened in the Palacio de la Diputación (Palace of the Deputation) in the Old San Juan historic quarter, the former seat of the Provincial Deputation of Puerto Rico, which intermittently represented the archipelago and island at the Cortes Generales or Spanish Parliament from the enactment Constitution of Cadiz in 1812 to the establishment of the Autonomous Province of Puerto Rico in 1897.

=== Design selection ===
In 1907, the amount of $250,000 was allocated for the construction of the building and another $50,000 for the establishment of an international competition for a final design, which was to be divided into three principal spaces to house the Legislative Assembly, composed of the Executive Council, a precursor to the Senate composed of 11 members appointed by the President of the U.S., and the House of Delegates, a precursor to the House of Representatives composed of 35 members elected by the Puerto Rican people, and the Supreme Court, a judicial body composed of a chief justice and four associate justices appointed by the President.

By 1908, a total of 139 architectural designs were submitted in anonymity mostly from the U.S., but also from Puerto Rico, Cuba, Canada, and France. The evaluation of the proposals was headed by William F. Willoughby, President of the Executive Council, José de Diego, Speaker of the House and represented by Luis Muñoz Rivera, José S. Quiñones, Chief Justice of the Supreme Court, and Laurence Grahame, Secretary of the Interior. Three American architects also joined the commission: E.B. Homerde, John E. Howe, and Bowen Bancroft Smith. Three projects were selected, belonging to Frank E. Perkins from New York City, James H. Ritchie and Lewis B. Abbot from Boston, and Henry L. Beadle from New York City.

==== Neoclassical design by Perkins and Beaux-Arts design by Del Valle Zeno ====
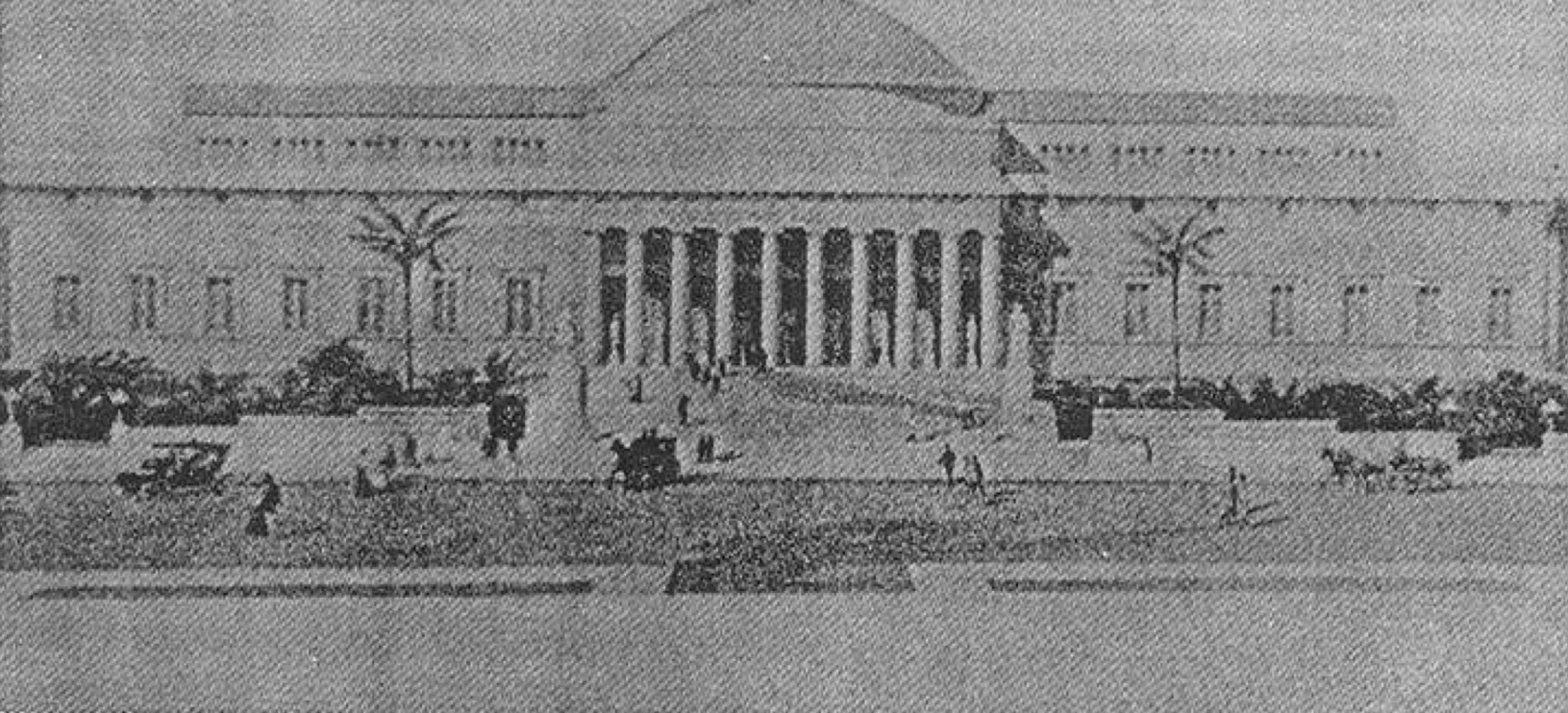
Main façade (south) of Perkins’ Neoclassical design, 1908

The evaluating commission decided on the design summited by Perkins, which presented an austere Neoclassical style defined by simplicity, symmetry, and proportion. Comparable to state capitols in the U.S., the proposal featured a lowered dome similar to that of the ancient Roman Pantheon in Rome and a Doric portico similar to that of the ancient Greek Parthenon in Athens. The design, which south-oriented main façade on Juan Ponce de León Avenue also included an attic story, had a U-shaped layout centered around a large patio flanked on either side by wings with a double story colonnade of free standing columns that had an open view of the North Atlantic Ocean.

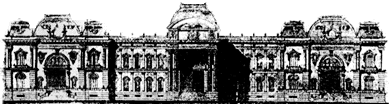
Main façade (south) of Del Valle Zeno's Beaux-Arts design, 1908

However, Luis Muñoz Rivera preferred a project that had been disqualified for not following the established rules of the contest by including the slogan "LEX" (meaning Law in Latin) in his submission. Created by Puerto Rican architect Rafael del Valle Zeno, who built the Antiguo Casino de Puerto Rico, the proposal presented an elaborate Beaux-Arts design defined by symmetry, grandiosity, and ornamentation. Similar to the CEC Palace in Bucharest and Petit Palais in Paris, the proposal featured a tall portico supported by four columns and topped with a mansard roof, short wings layered with pilasters framing rows of pedimented windows, and grand pavilions with mansard roofs and ornate decoration. The main façade of the design was oriented to the south, facing Juan Ponce de León Avenue and San Juan Bay.

In 1909, the construction rights for the design of Perkins were auctioned, with the lowest bid amounting to $314,429. Exceeding the budget available, its construction was postponed. In 1919, the Legislative Assembly appropriated the sum of $500,000 for the Capitol and directed the Secretary of the Interior, Guillermo Esteves, to proceed with the bidding for the work. Considered to be a structurally and spatially inadequate building that would exceed the budget cap, the design of Perkins was replaced in 1920.

==== Renaissance design by Finlayson ====
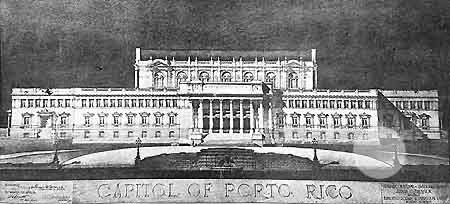
Main façade (south) of Finlayson's Renaissance design, 1922

Francisco Roldán and Pedro de Castro, two Puerto Rican architects working in the Division of Public Buildings in the Department of Interior under the supervision of State Architect Adrian C. Finlayson, created an expansive Renaissance design defined by symmetry, proportion, and harmony. Similar to the Palazzo Farnese in Rome and the Biblioteca Marciana in Venice, the proposal featured an octastyle portico under an elaborate arcade flanked on either side by long wings containing rows of windows and topped with a balustrade. Facing Juan Ponce de León Avenue and San Juan Bay, the wings continued to recessed pavilions which extended towards the north, creating a U-shaped layout centered around a large patio overlooking the North Atlantic Ocean.

In 1921, the design of Finlayson began to be constructed on a vacant plot of land located immediately outside the walls of the historic quarter of Old San Juan, overlooking the North Atlantic Ocean and San Juan Bay from an elevated point in San Juan Islet. However, its construction was halted after completion of the first level due to political instability in the main island. During this time, Finlyson, Roldán, and de Castro resigned from the project.

==== Neoclassical Beaux-Arts design by Carmoega ====
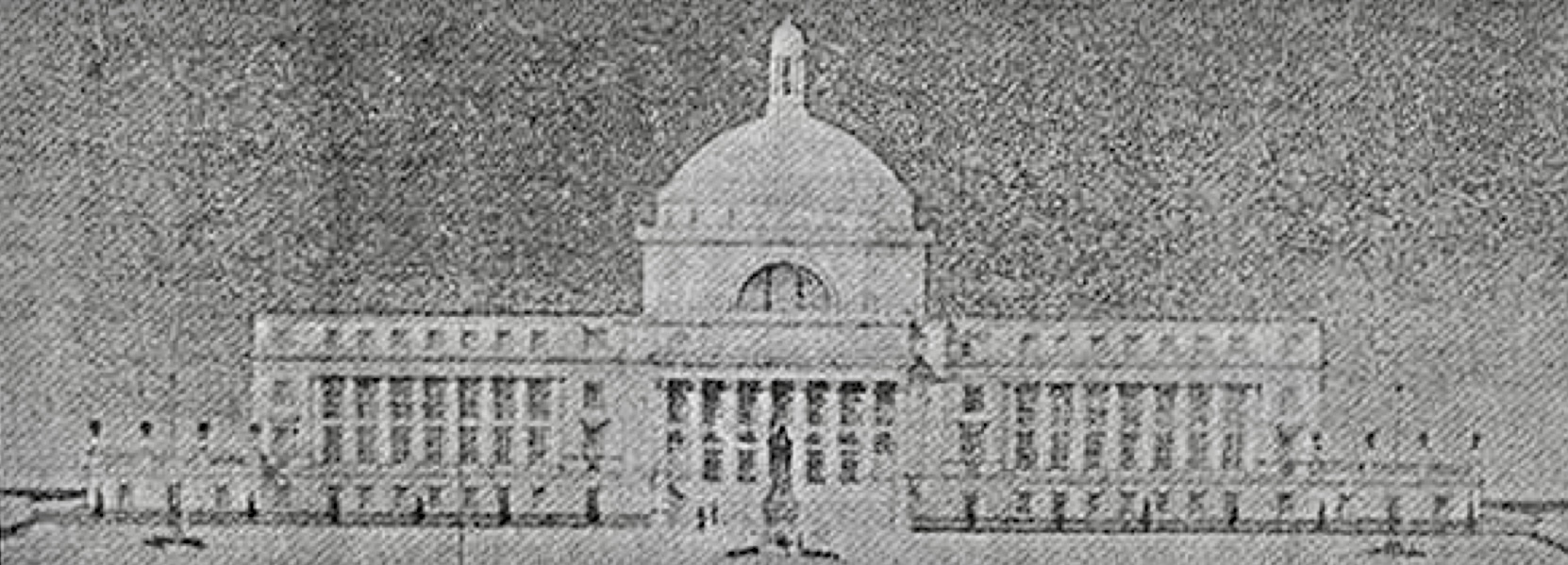
Main façade (north) of Carmoega's Neoclassical Beaux-Arts design, 1924

In 1925, the work was resumed under a new State Architect, Puerto Rican Rafael Carmoega who, alongside other architects, created the current design. Defined by clear symmetry, simple geometry, and minimal ornamentation like most state capitols and government buildings in the U.S., especially in the capital of Washington D.C., the austere Neoclassical Beaux-Arts design is reflective of the most used style for civic architecture in the U.S. at the time.

Carmoega retained the lowered dome and attic story proposed by Perkins and the octastyle portico with no pediment and rows of windows endorsed by Fynlayson, largely basing the building on the Low Memorial Library in New York. Carmoega changed the direction of the main façade to the north to overlook the North Atlantic Ocean, adding a colonnade of freestanding columns to the recessed wings and finishing the projected pavilions only to the first floor as terraces adorned with balusters and vases.

Despite the interior not being completely finished, the Capitol was officially inaugurated on February 11, 1929, with the first meeting of the Legislative Assembly taking place three days later.

=== Architectural drawings ===
The Architecture and Construction Archives at the University of Puerto Rico (AACUPR) is the custodian of the Capitol of Puerto Rico Collection (1924–1926). Approximately eight cubic feet in size, the collection contains architectural drawings, photographs and textual documents.

The original drawings, executed in ink over drawing cloth, were produced by the Department of the Interior under the supervision of Puerto Rican State Architect Rafael Carmoega. The 28 originals and 38 blue prints show plans, elevations, sections as well as electrical and plumbing distribution. There is also a proposal for the surrounding gardens by the architectural firm of Bennet, Parsons and Frost and several plates showing entries for the building competition. The collection was transferred to the AACUPR by the Capitol Superintendency in 1986.

== Exterior architecture ==
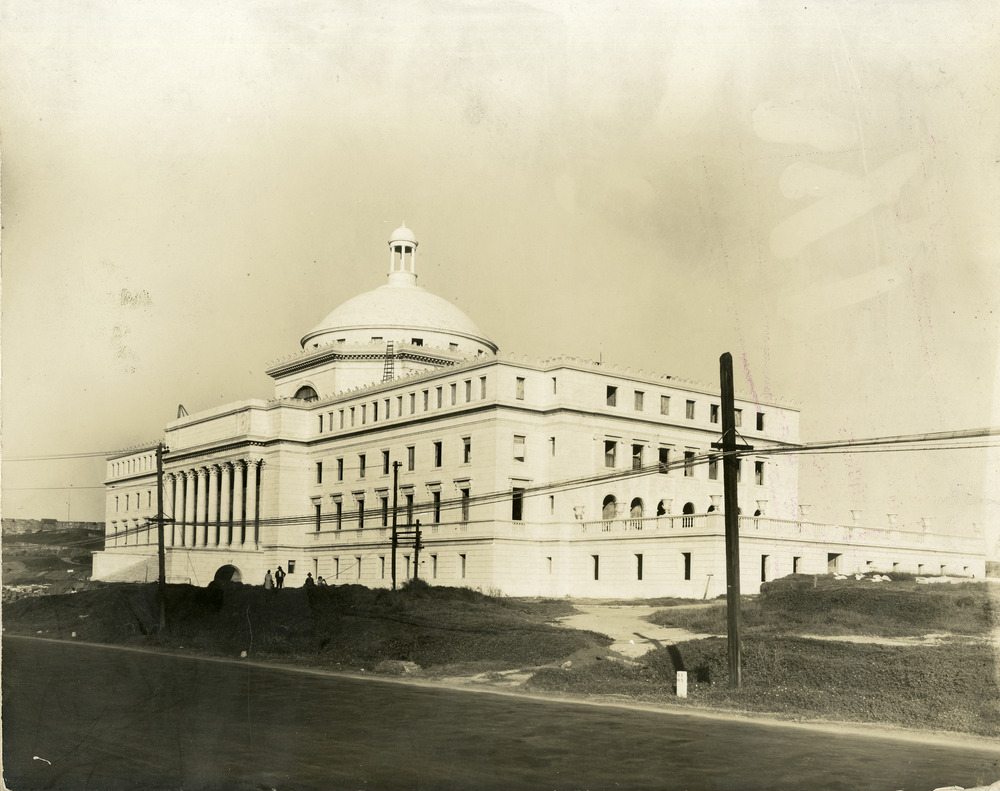
Rear façade (south) and side profile (east), c. 1929

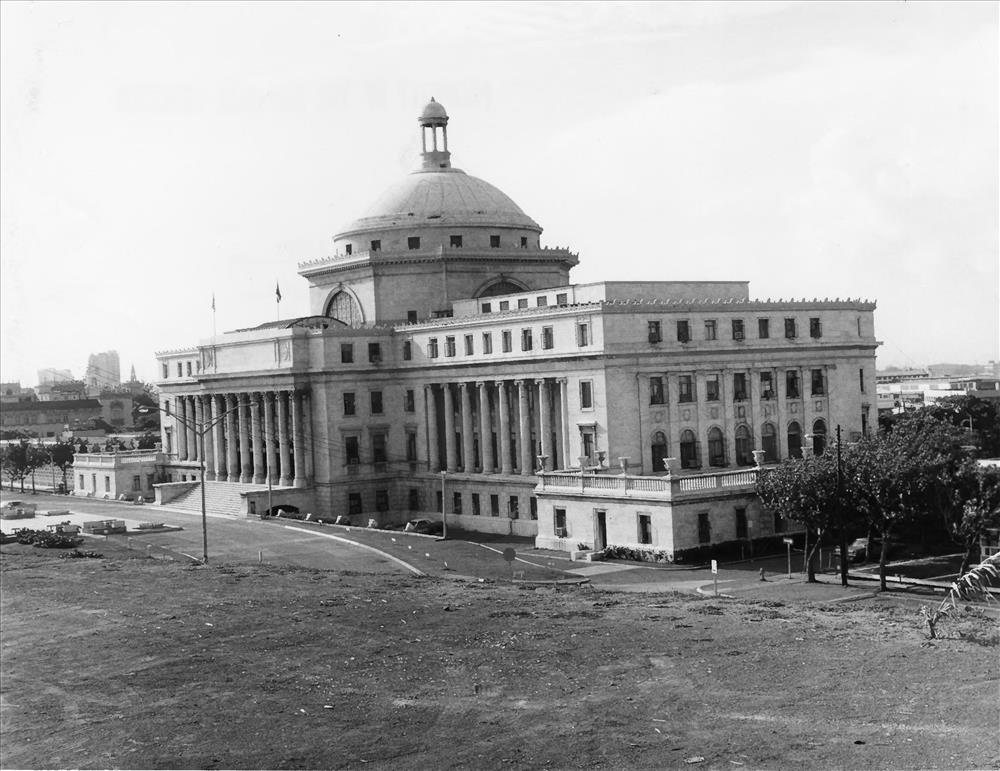
Main façade (north) and side profile (west), 1977

Covering an area of 51,814 square feet (4,813.7 m^{2}) with a rough length of 400 feet (120 m), width of 125 feet (38 m), and height of 145 feet (44 m), the Capitol of Puerto Rico is an austere Neoclassical Beaux-Arts style building principally designed and built by Puerto Rican architect Rafael Carmoega from 1921 to 1929. It is largely based on the Low Memorial Library in New York City. Featuring clear symmetry, simple geometry, and minimal ornamentation like most state capitols and federal buildings in the U.S., the austere Neoclassical Beaux-Arts design is reflective of the widely used style for civic architecture in the U.S. at the time.

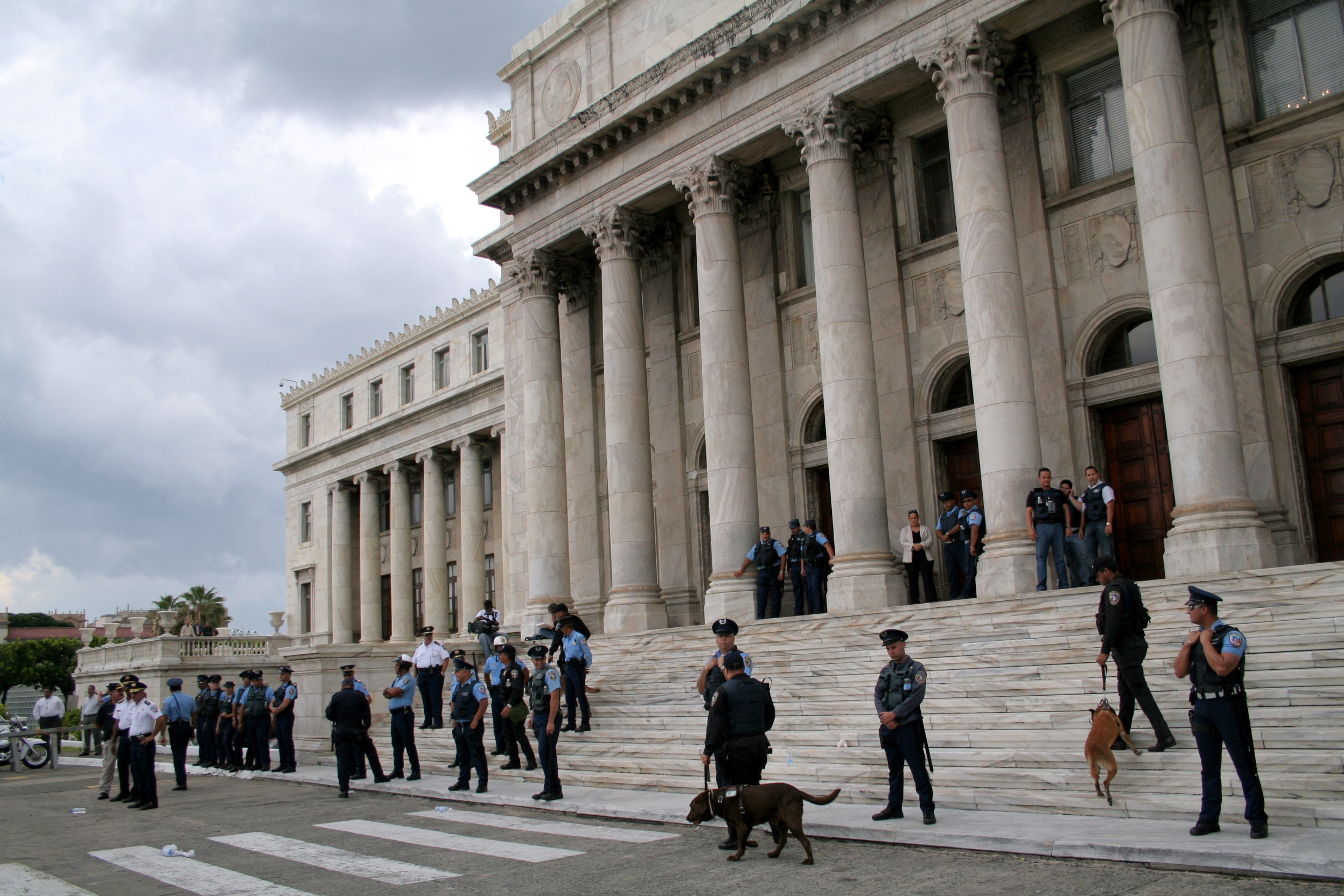
North portico, and east colonnade wing and terrace pavilion, 2006

The layout of the building is rectangular with a principal block in the center consisting of a portico and a pendentive dome, which are flanked by a wing and a pavilion on either side. Made of concrete and steel with an exterior and inside entirely covered in 21 different types of marble, specifically 16 from Italy, 4 from continental United States, and one from Spain. It has four stories, the first being a ground floor and the last an attic story. Each story is demarcated by a row of windows, with the windows in the first floor being the only ones containing pediments. The cymatium of the cornice framing the porticos, wings, and octagonal base of the dome are decorated with a continuous palmette or anthemion motif.

The entire exterior of the building is faced with white marble from the U.S. state of Georgia.

=== Orientation ===
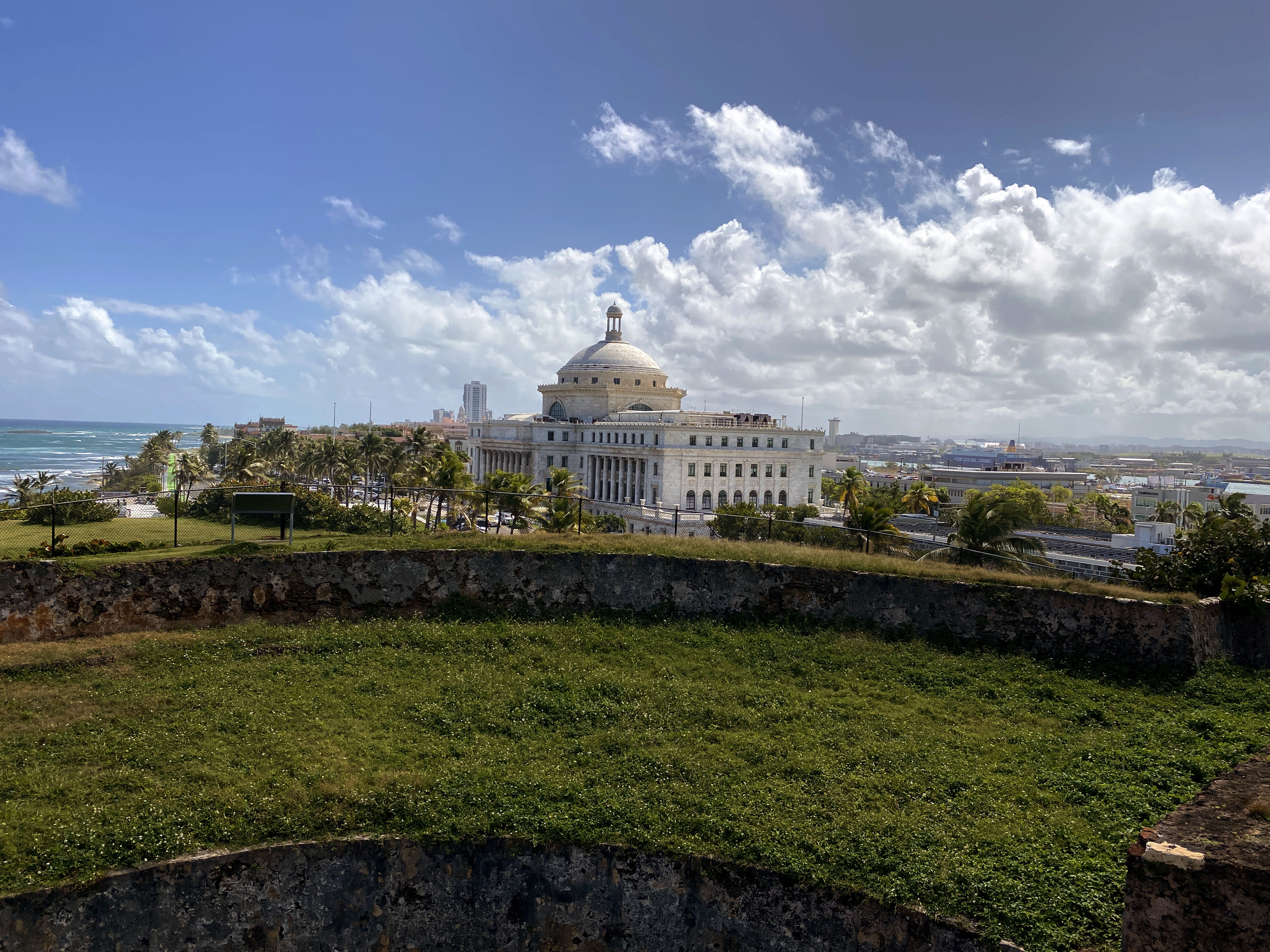
Northwestern profile from San Cristóbal Fortress in Old San Juan historic district, 2020

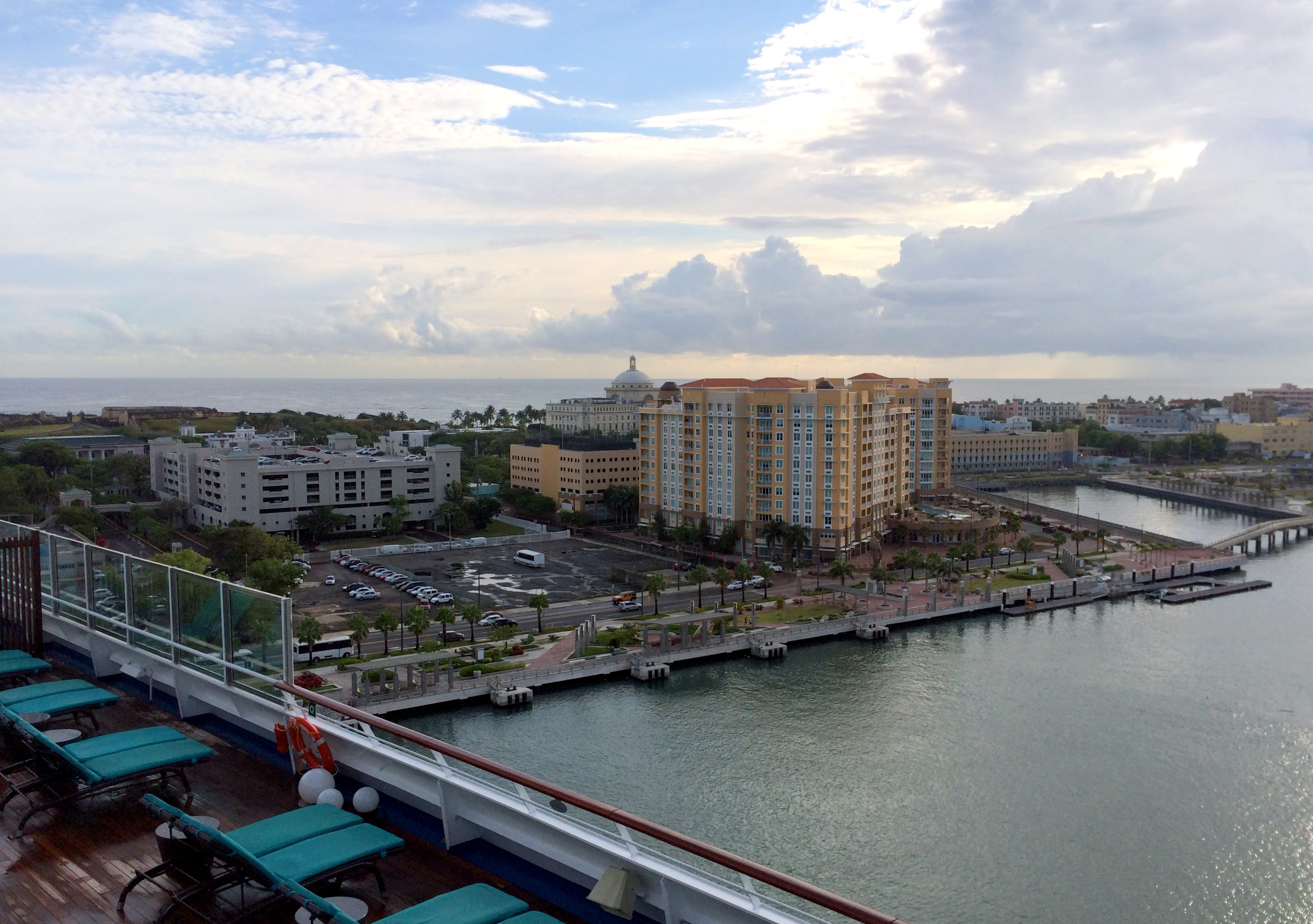
Southwestern profile from San Juan Cruise Port on San Juan Bay in Old San Juan, 2014

Situated immediately above the northern cliffs of San Juan Islet, the main façade of the Capitol is oriented to the north, facing Luis Muñoz Rivera Avenue and the North Atlantic Ocean. The rear façade is oriented to the south, facing Juan Ponce de León Avenue, San Juan Bay, and the main island of Puerto Rico. The north orientation of the main façade of building symbolizes the welcoming of all visitors coming from outside of Puerto Rico, while the south orientation of the rear façade symbolizes the welcoming of all visitors within Puerto Rico.

=== Porticos ===
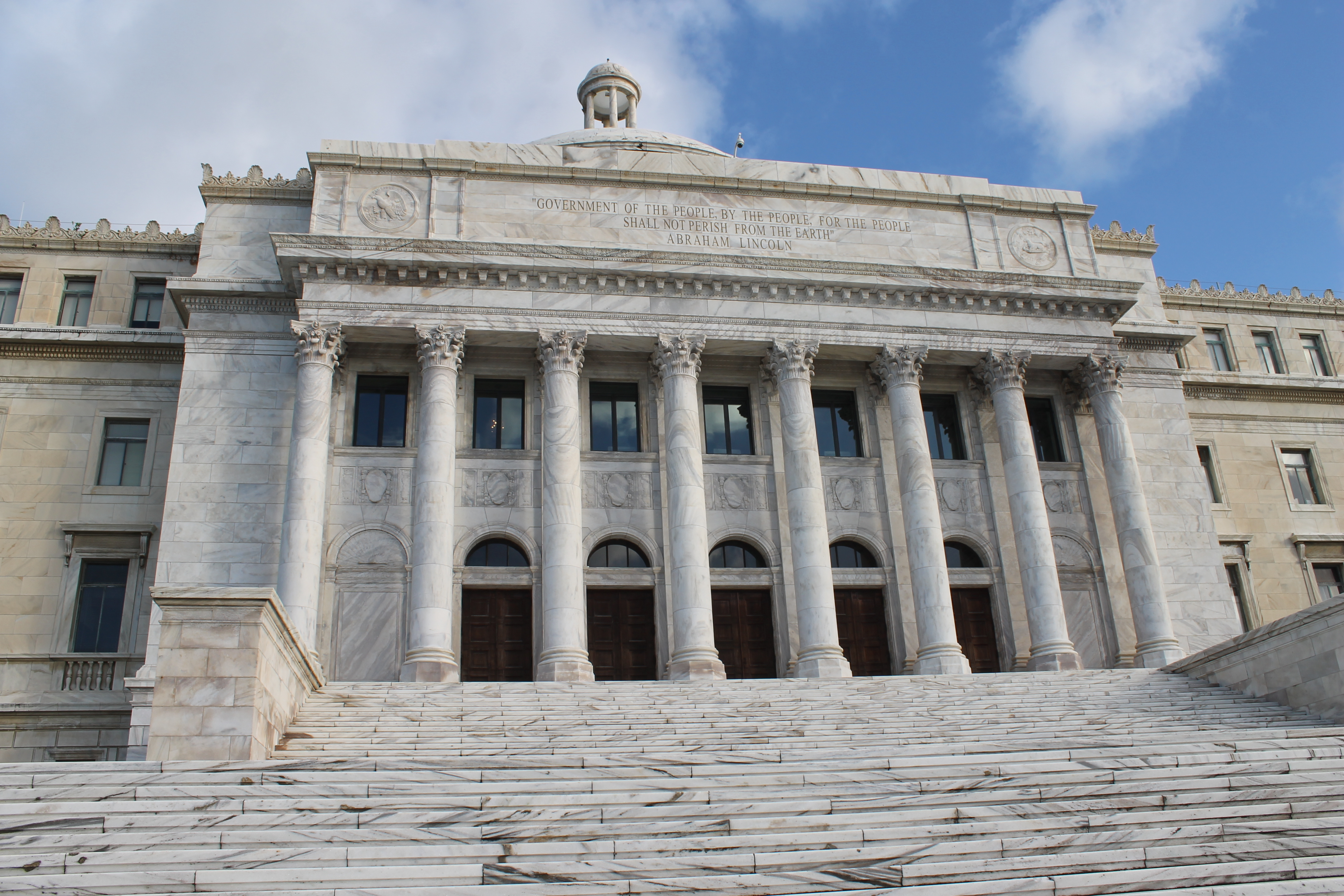
South portico, 2014

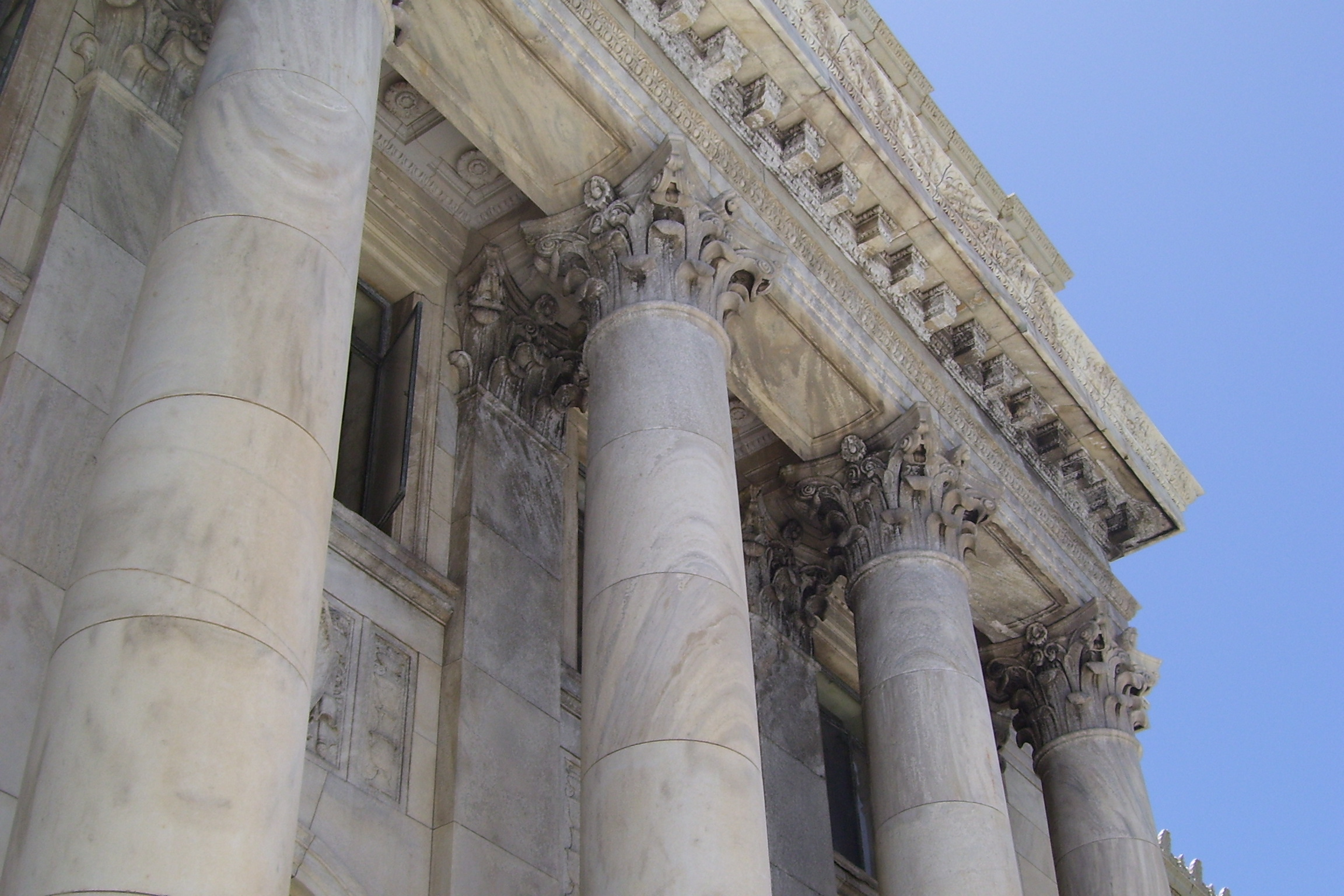
North portico columns and entablature, 2009

On both façades, the main entrances are located in the central, principal block of the building as projected porticos consisting of a Corinthian-style colonnade of eight columns standing on a rusticated ground floor and supporting an entablature and attic. Both porticos are accessible by a wide marble staircase containing one flight in the north, and two flights in the south. Both staircases lead to seven arched doorways, with the five in the middle serving as functioning doors and the other two as a blind doors. The doors represent the original seven electoral districts of Puerto Rico.

=== Inscriptions ===
The attic story above the colonnade of both porticos is inscribed with text, which is centered in-between an engraving of the coat of arms of the U.S. and Puerto Rico.

The main façade (north) on Luis Muñoz Rivera Avenue is inscribed with the following quotation in Spanish by leader of the 3rd Resident Commissioner of Puerto Rico, Luis Muñoz Rivera:

"El derecho, la libertad y la dignidad por encima de todo"

Transliterated in English, it reads as "Law, freedom, and dignity above all."

The rear façade (south) on Juan Ponce de León Avenue is inscribed with the following Gettysburg Address quote in English by the 16th president of the U.S., Abraham Lincoln:

"Government of the people, by the people, for the people, shall not perish from the Earth"

=== Dome ===
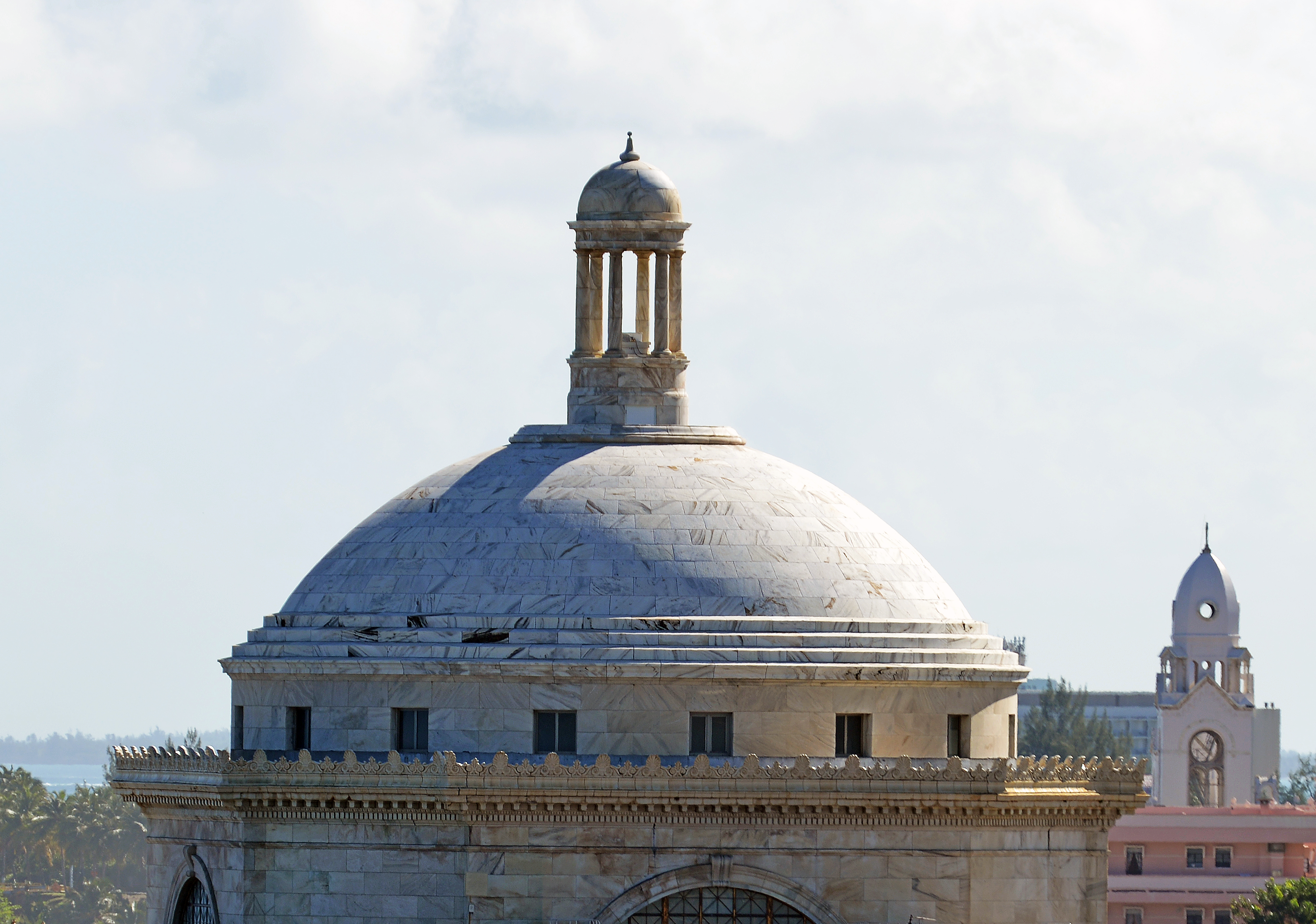

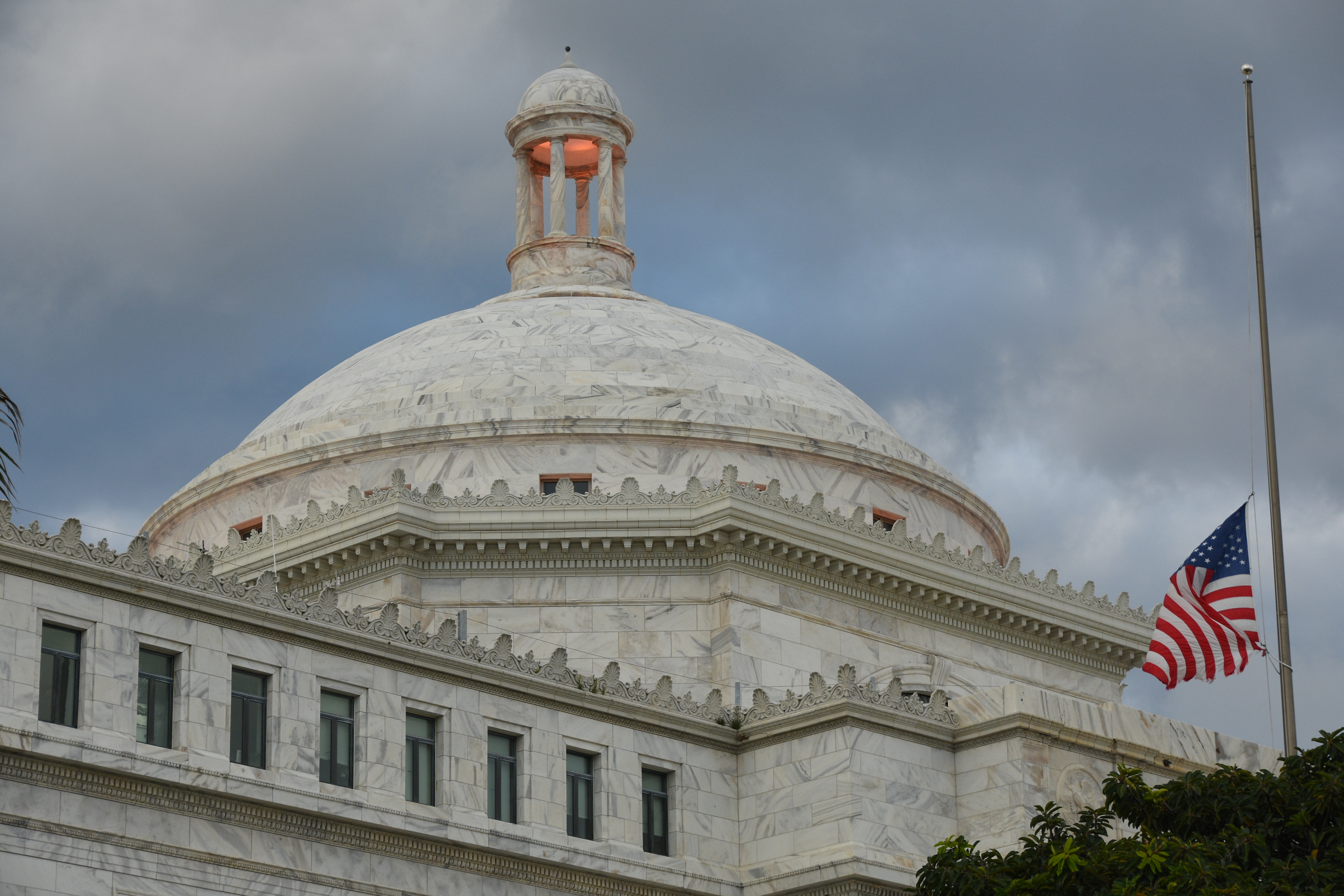
Dome, 2014 (top) and 2025 (bottom)

Above the top of the attic story in the porticos, a large tholobate or drum with small windows supports a dome, which rests on an octagonal pendentive base. Like in Florence Cathedral, the dome is double-shelled, featuring two separate dome layers with space in between them. The inner shell provides the usable ceiling, while the outer one offers a grand exterior appearance. The style of the lowered, expansive dome is modeled after that of the ancient Roman Pantheon in Rome, while the pendentive construction device it relies on was first used in the Hagia Sophia in Istanbul. Each of the four main walls of the octagonal base of the dome has a large, half-round window, evocative of the lunettes atop the Baths of Caracalla and Diocletian. The dome is topped by a small cupola serving as a roof lantern, which are all accessible by staircases within the building.

=== Wings ===
Northwest wing, 2025

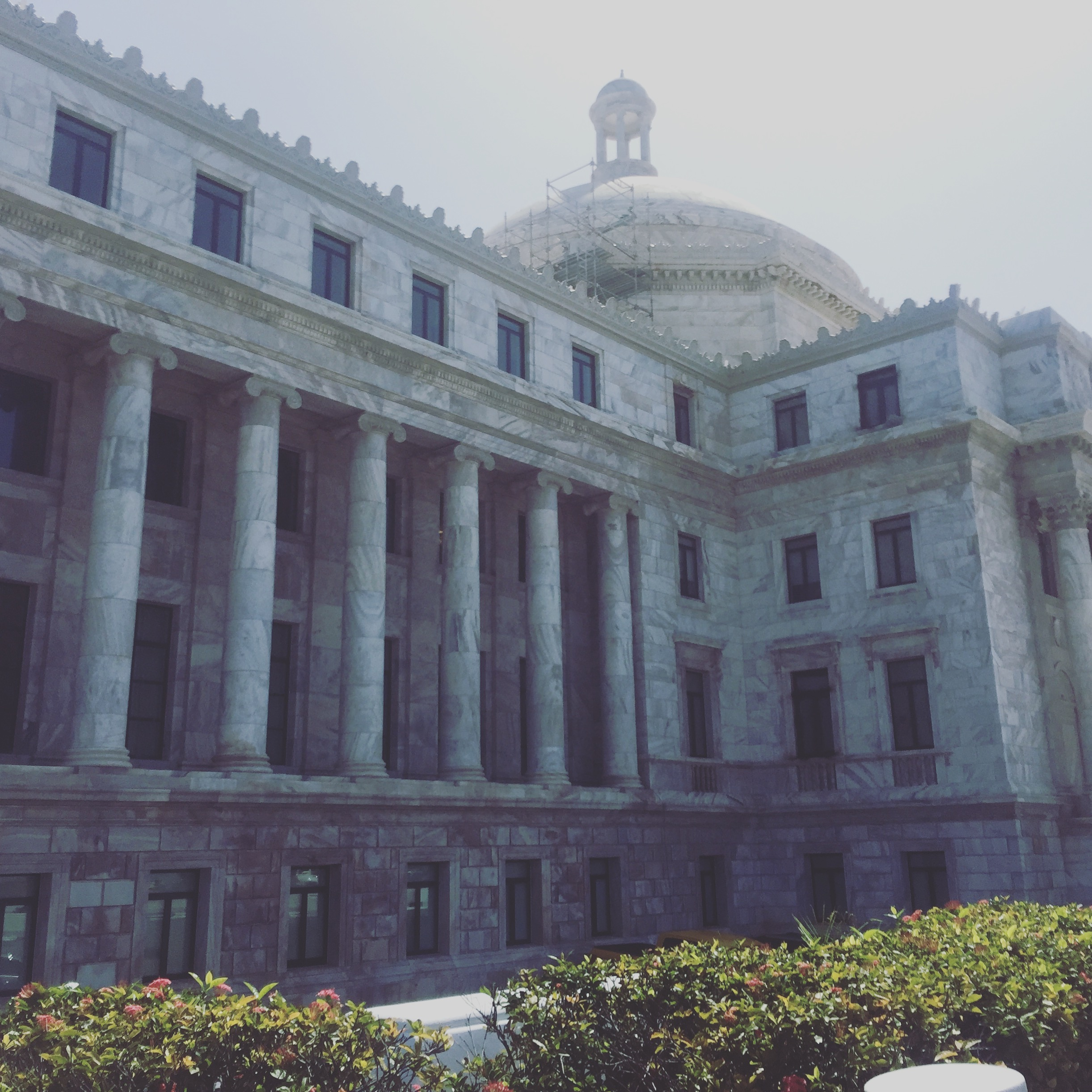
Northeast wing, 2018

The central, principal block of the building, which contains the porticos and dome, is flanked on either side by a wing. Consisting of a Doric-style colonnade of eight columns standing on a rusticated ground floor, the wings on the main façade (north) are recessed in relation to the portico and pavilions. In contrast, the wings in the rear façade (south) only contain rows of windows and are recessed only in relation to the portico. Continuing the design of the main facade in the north, the wings in the eastern and western sides contain a Doric-style colonnade, but instead of freestanding columns, it has pilasters.

=== Pavilions ===
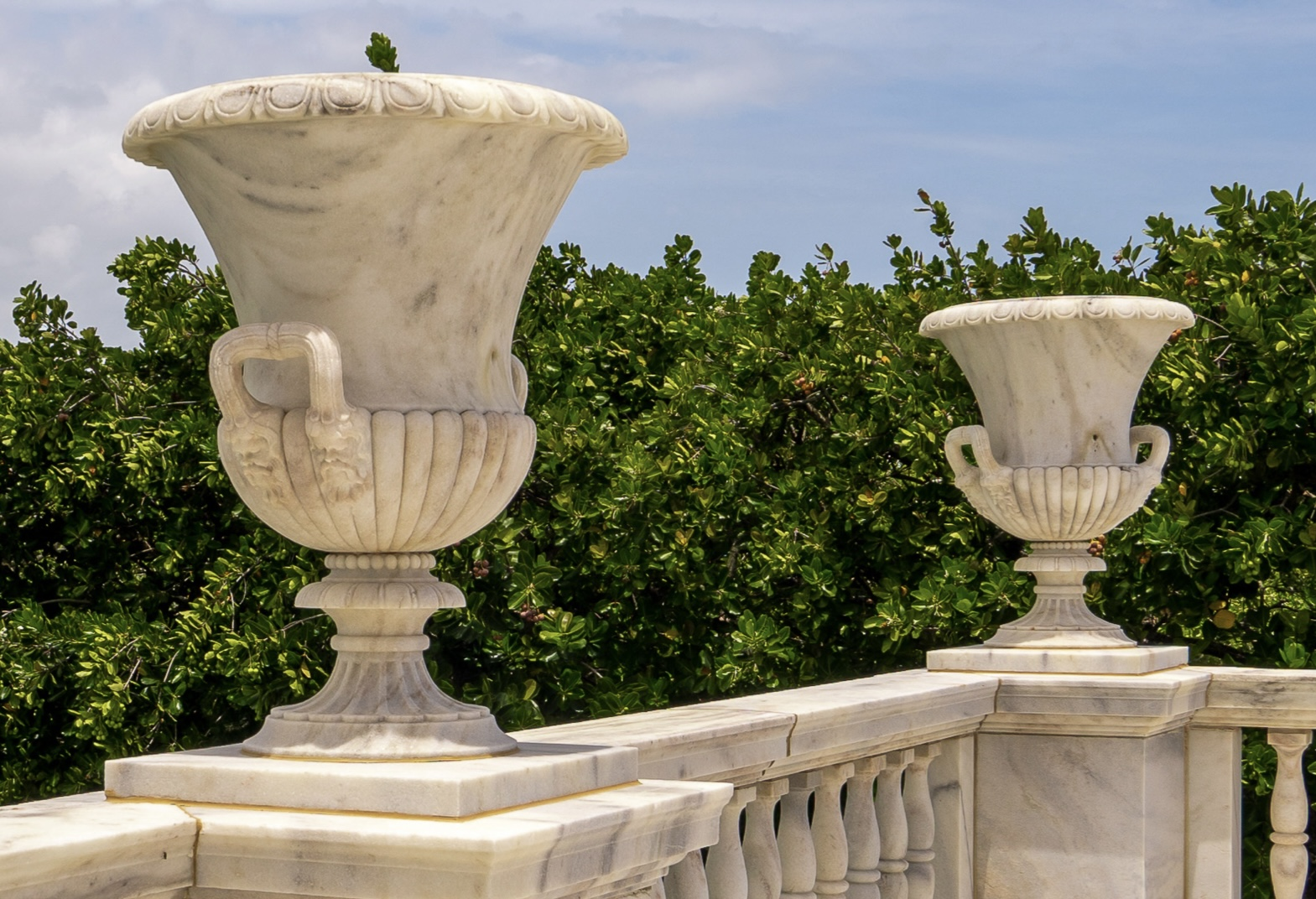
Terrace balustrade and vases, 2024

Next to the wings, the pavilions are located on the extreme ends of the building. Adorned with balusters and vases, the pavilions are finished to the first floor as terraces with open views of the building and surrounding area. The eastern terrace (Senate side) is named after Governor and Senate President Rafael Hernández Colón and the western (House side) is named after House Speaker José Ronaldo Jarabo Álvarez. The pavilions are projected like the portico on the main façade (north). In contrast, they are recessed in relation to the portico and the wings on the rear façade (south). The balustrade enclosing the terraces continues through the full length of wings as a decorative motif only on the south façade, delimiting the ground floor from the first floor. Part of the ground floor, the pavilions serve as secondary side entrances to the building.

== Interior architecture ==
=== Vestibules ===
The doors located on the projected porticos in the principal block of the building lead to a vestibule on the first floor.

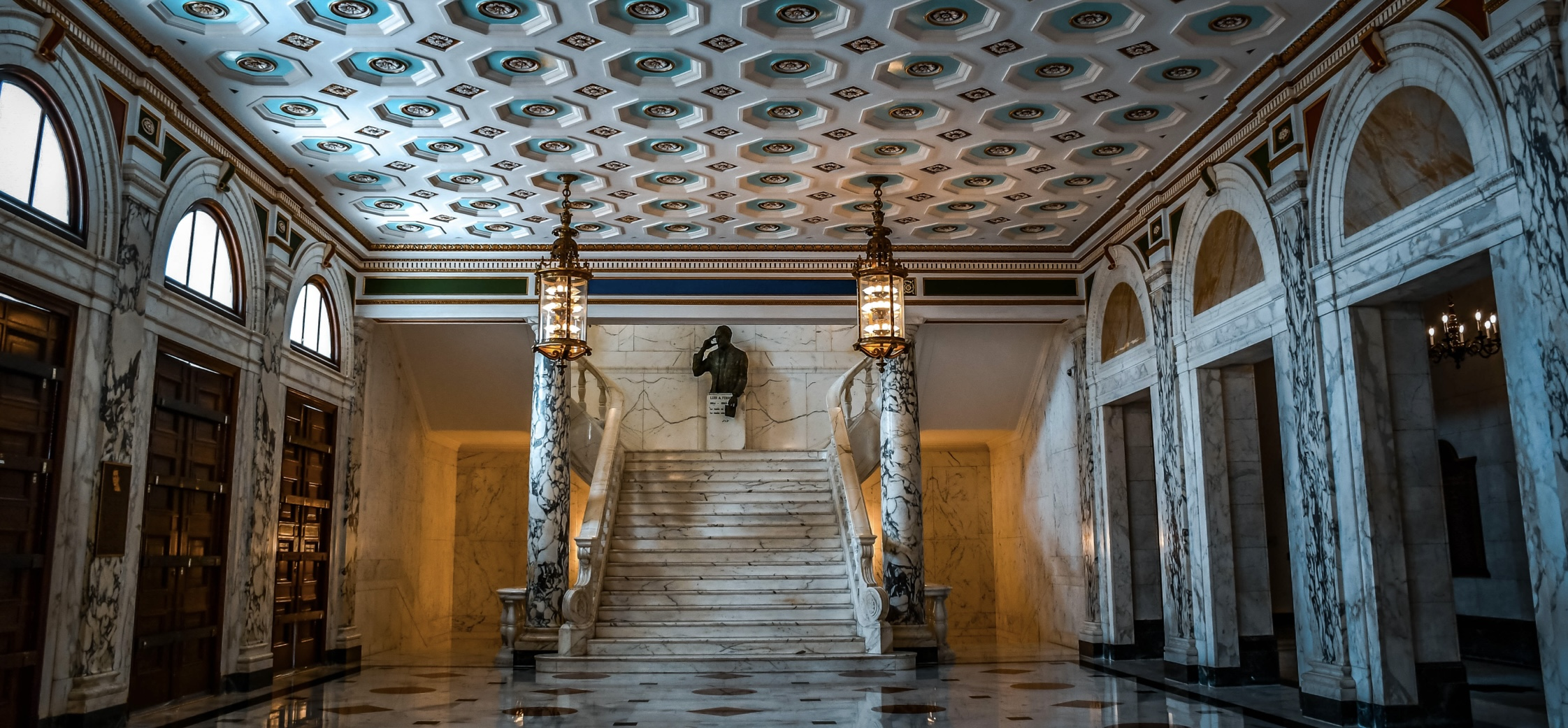
South vestibule, 2024

Named after painter Julio Tomás Martínez, the vestibule in the south is a horizontal rectangular, low-ceiling room, extending the length of five doors on the portico. The floor and walls of the space are covered in marble, with the walls featuring white marble alongside black and white marble pilasters. The ceiling is decorated with 112 (8 rows and 14 columns) octagonal coffers made of plaster, all sculpted and painted by artists at the School of Plastic Arts and Design of Puerto Rico. The frieze around the room alternates with the colors red, green, and blue, with red representing the Senate of Puerto Rico, green the House of Representatives of Puerto Rico, and blue the equal coexistence between both legislative bodies.

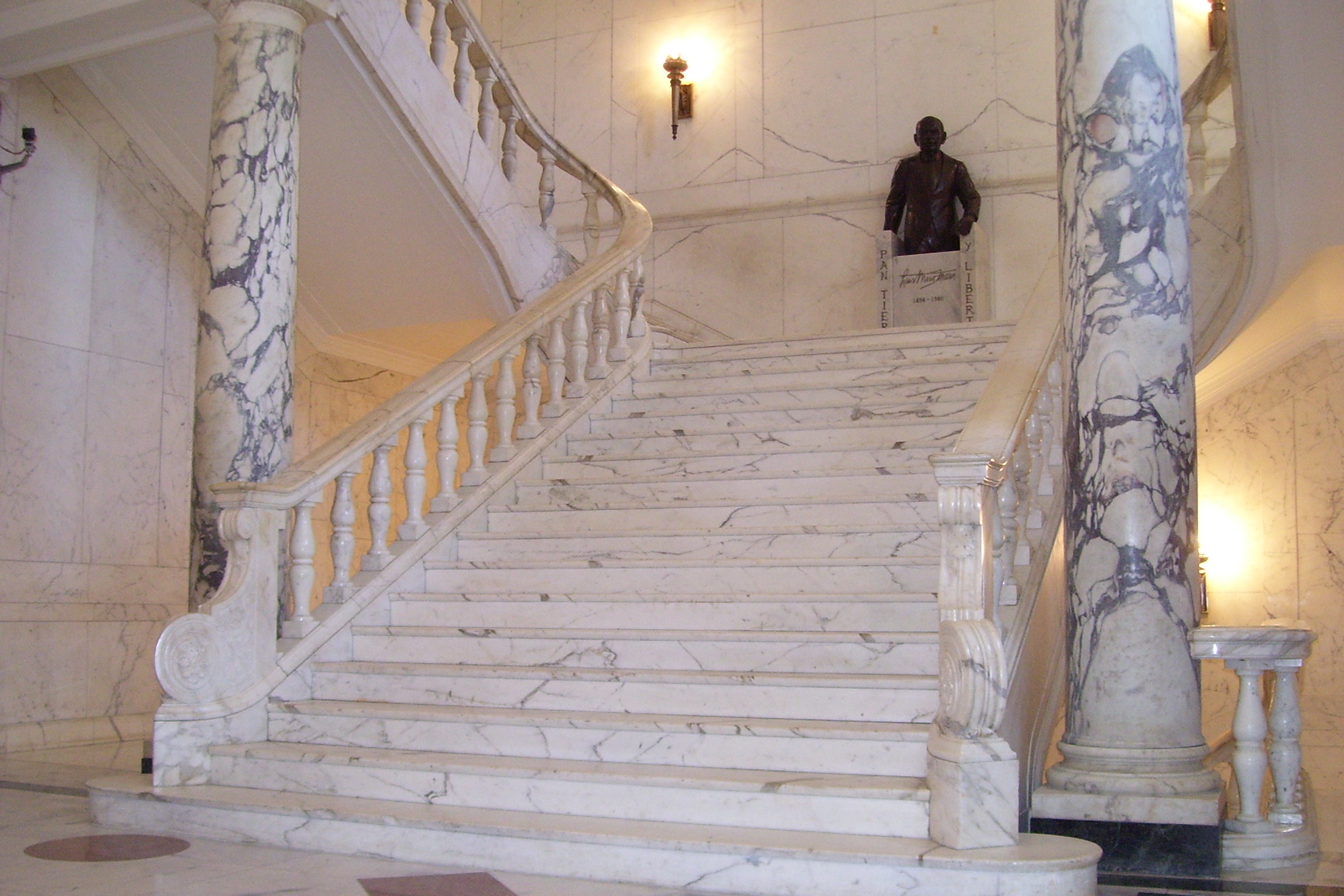
East vestibule stairs, 2009

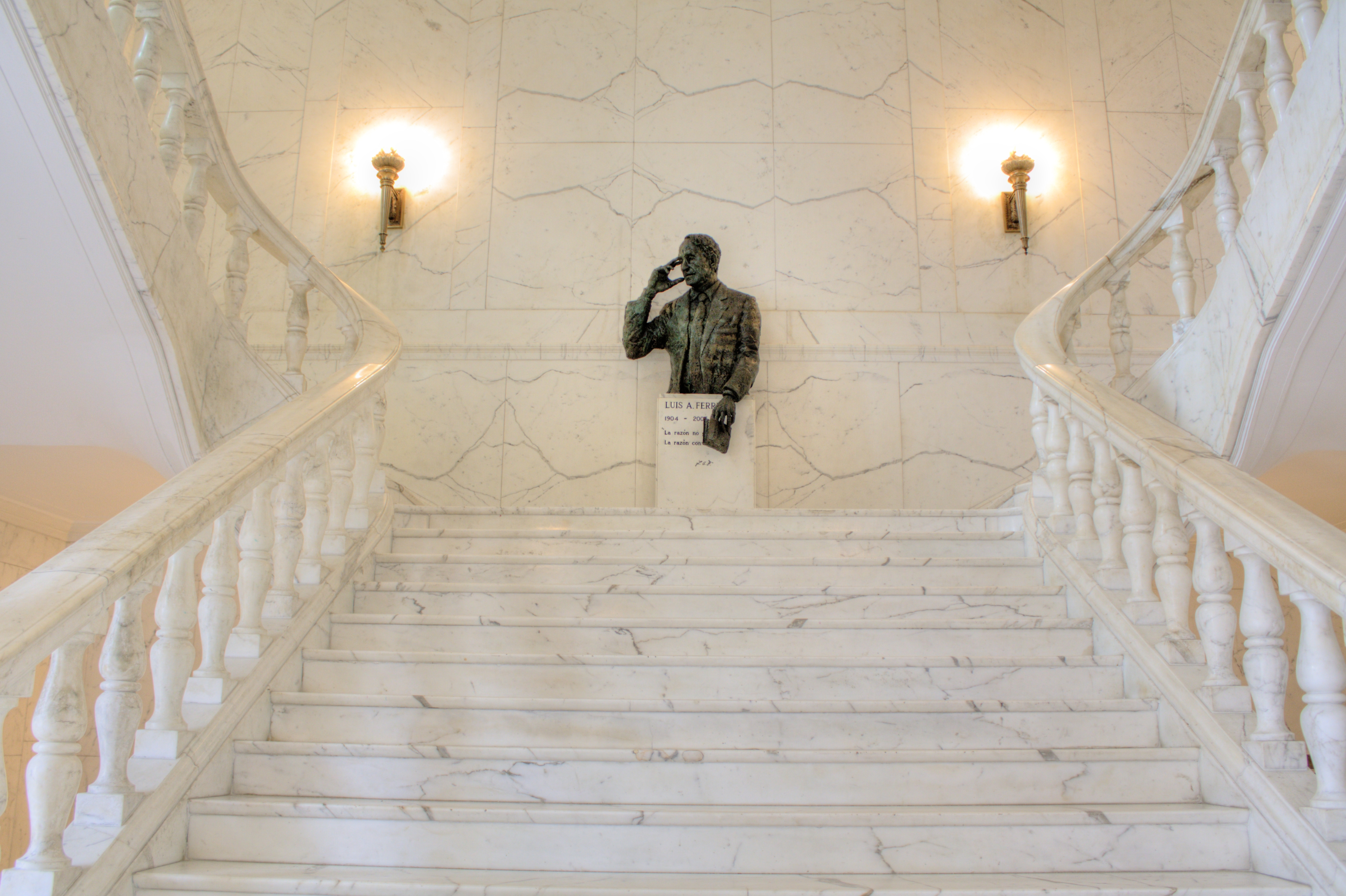
West vestibule stairs, 2016

On either side of the vestibule, there is a wide, straight Venato Statuario white marble staircase with an intermediate landing, where it separates into two narrower staircases leading to the second floor. On the east landing rests a bust of Governor Luis Muñoz Marín (1949–1965), first democratically elected executive of Puerto Rico and founder of the pro-commonwealth Popular Democratic Party (PPD), and on the west, rests one of Governor Luis A. Ferré, third democratically elected governor of Puerto Rico and founder of the pro-statehood New Progressive Party (PNP). The staircase is flanked by two Roman Doric, white and black marble columns extending the height of the room. These are immediately next to a narrow staircase leading to the ground floor. The room is host to a variety of events, including exhibitions and dinners.

Smaller than its equivalent in the south, the vestibule in the north is divided into two spaces. The five doors on the porticos open to a narrow, horizontal rectangular room cladded in white marble. At the end of the room, three door openings lead to a more specious space part of the vestibule. Also covered in white marble, it functions as the main entrance and security checkpoint into the building.

Both the southern and northern vestibules end at three door openings, which lead to a corridor. In the north, there is short corridor equal to the same length of the vestibule. It is flanked on either side by a narrow, straight white marble staircase leading to the second floor. In the south, the corridor extends the entire length of the building from the central block through and around the wings. Past both the narrow corridors, three door openings lead to the rotunda.

=== Rotunda ===
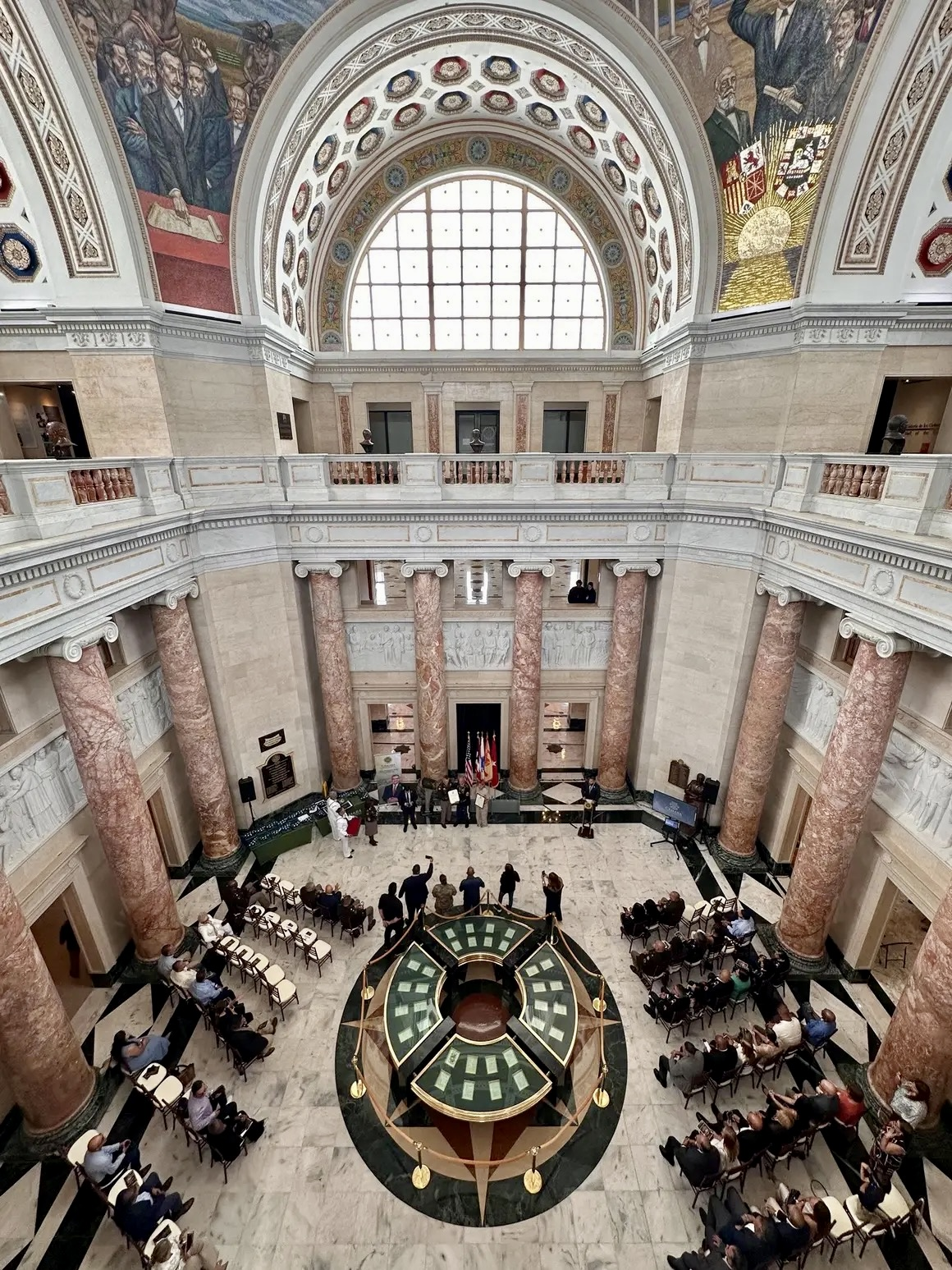
Rotunda, 2025

The squared rotunda is an 80-foot-high space bounded by 16 freestanding ionic columns made of Breccia Pernice, a warm marble, with a peachy-rose background encasing ivory-tinted clast from the northern region of Italy. In between the four columns per wall, which extend from the bottom of the first floor to the top of the second floor, there is a door opening on the first floor, a window on the second floor, and a marble relief panel dividing both on each of the four walls of the room, totaling three doors, windows, and relief panels per wall. The columns continue into the third floor as Roman Doric, Breccia Pernice pilasters, with a door opening in between them on each of the four walls. The part of this floor immediately surrounding the rotunda consists of a mezzanine or interior balcony enclosed within a balustrade made of Breccia Pernice balusters.

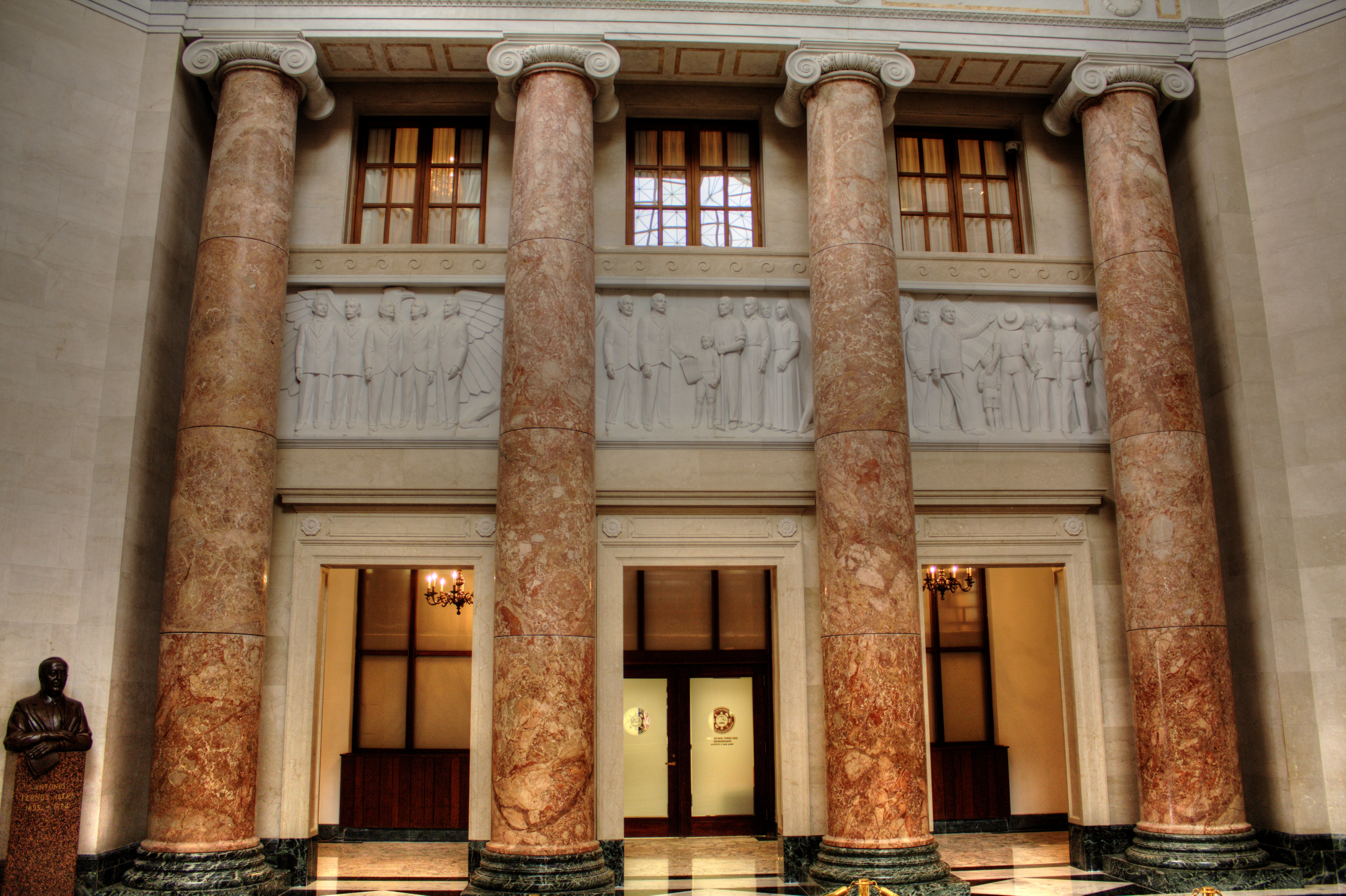
West wall, 2016

Above it, four pendentives decorated with allegoric mosaics, coffered arches, and bronze framed Diocletian windows with a mosaic frieze, support a dome, which is decorated with motifs in mosaic and relief form. Amounting to about 6 million pieces of Venetian glass produced during five years by 25 Italian artists from the House of Enrique Pandolfini in Pietrasanta, Tuscany, the mosaics were installed by lead artist, Gino Garibaldi, in 1962. The patterns or underdrawings for the marble reliefs and mosaics were created by four Puerto Rican artists, namely Rafael Ríos Rey, José Oliver, Rafael Tufiño, and Jorge Rechany.

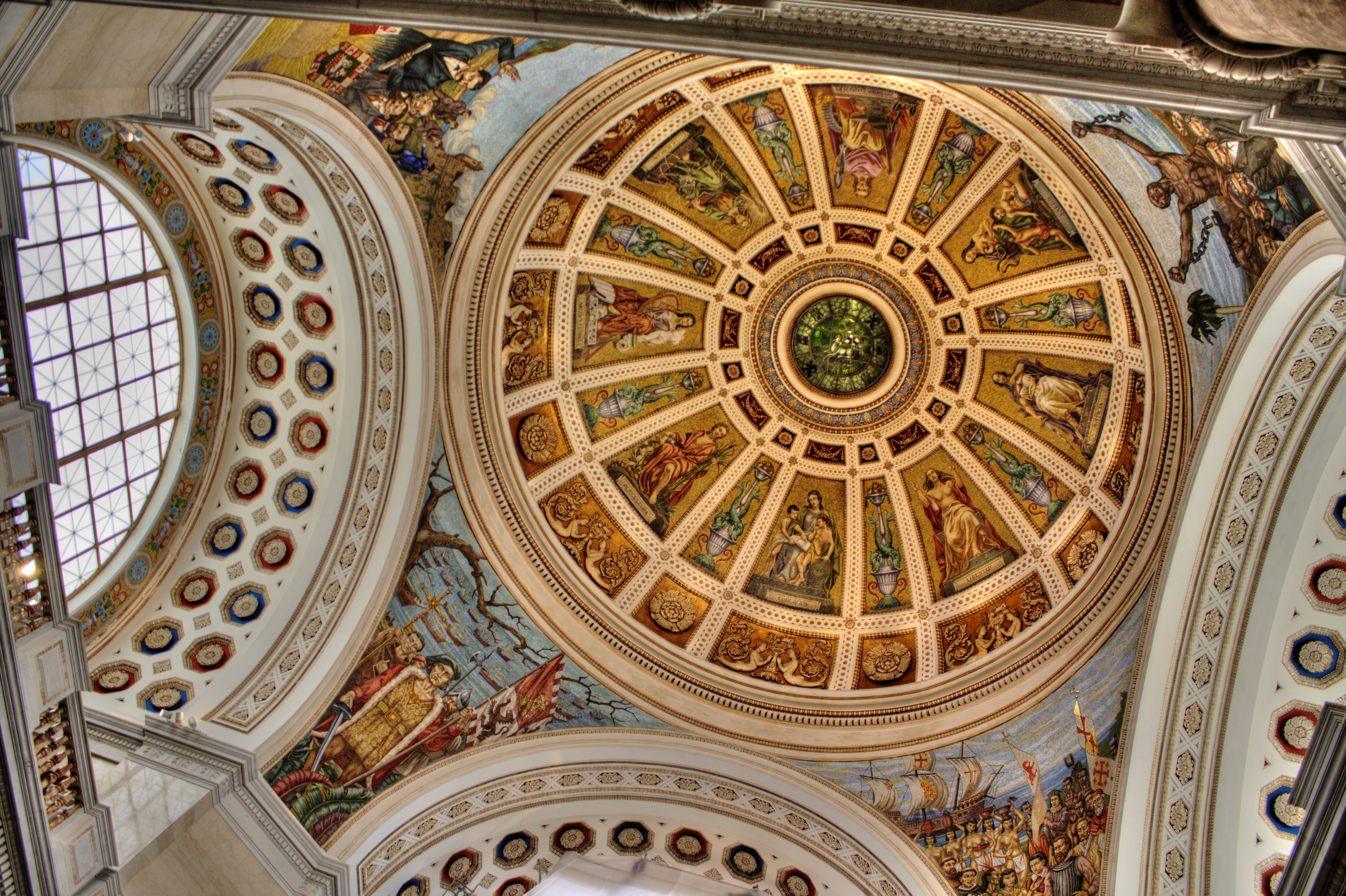
Pendentives and dome, 2016

The dome ends at its highest point, the oculus or opaion, which is covered by a stained glass window in the shape of the Great Seal of Puerto Rico, with the Lamb looking north. Located in the center of the dome, it is directly above the original documents of the Constitution of Puerto Rico, which are showcased on a bulletproof glass display table in the center of the first floor. The table rests on top of marble tiles in the shape of a compass rose, symbolizing the authority of the Constitution as the guiding force behind the government and people of Puerto Rico.

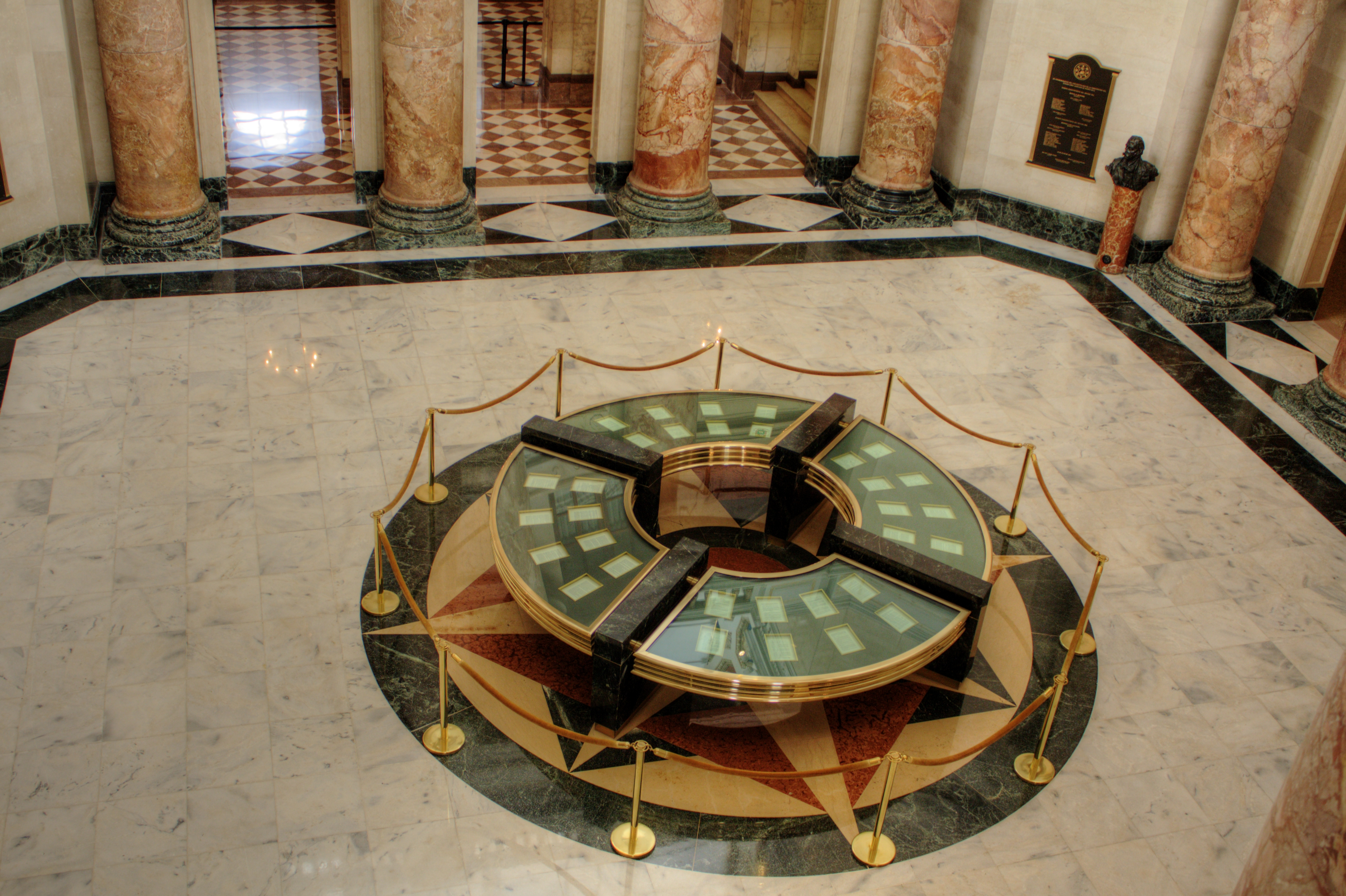
Display of the Constitution of Puerto Rico, 2016

==== Marble reliefs ====
The in-between spaces between the top of the first floor doors and the bottom of the second floor windows on each wall are decorated with a relief panel made of white marble from Carrara in Tuscany. Totaling 12 panels, each one represents an important event in the history of Puerto Rico.

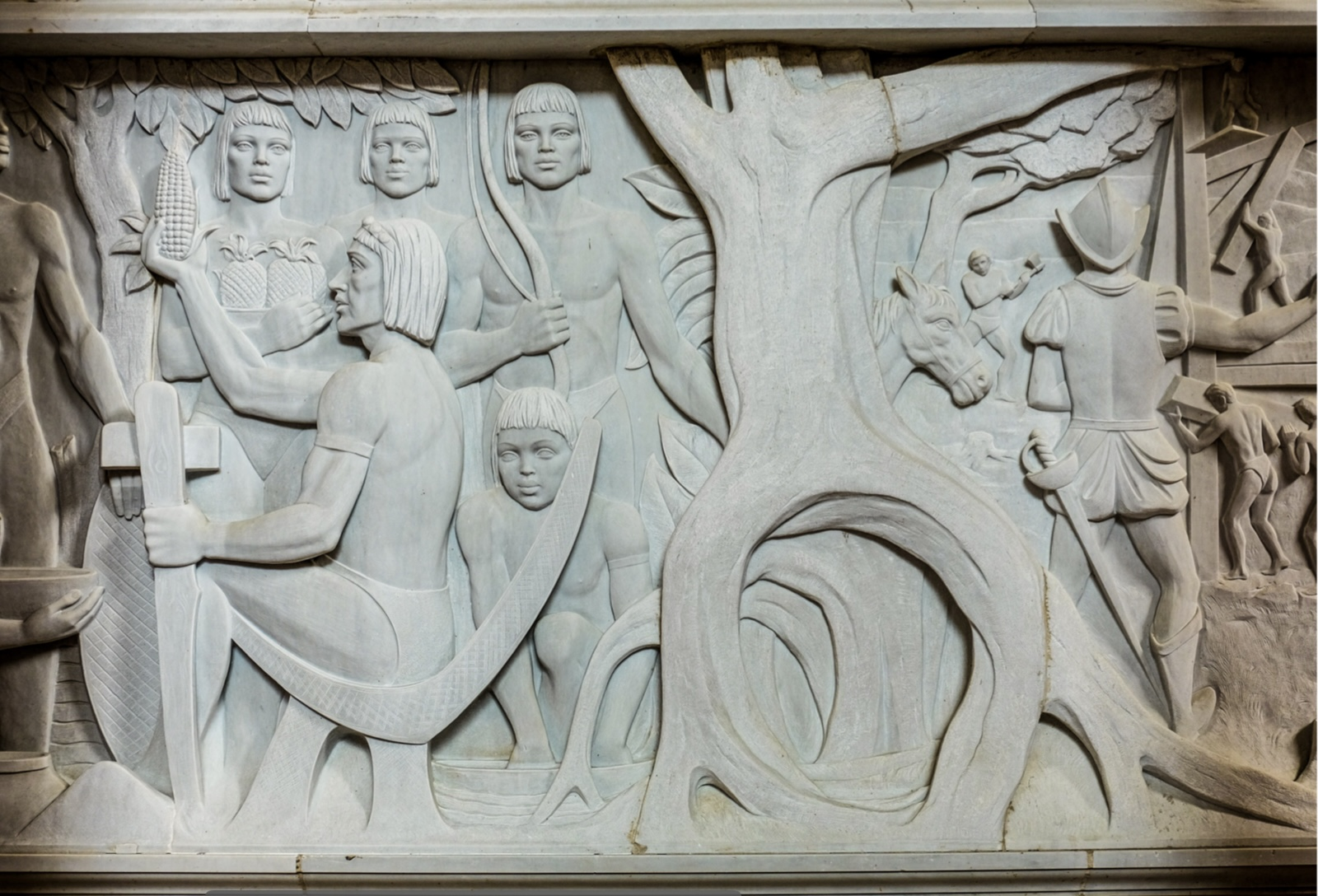
First relief (north wall), 2024

From left to right, the three panels on the north wall depict events related to the start of the European conquest and colonization of the main island during the 16th century. The first panel is divided by a tree trunk, showing on one side Cacique Agüeybaná II, the rebellious tribal chieftain of the Taíno, the native people of Puerto Rico, addressing the shaman doctor, warriors, and people, and on the other side, the first European explorer and conquistador of Puerto Rico, Juan Ponce de León, supervising a group of Taíno men, who are working on the construction of the village of Caparra or the city of Puerto Rico, the first European settlement in the main island established by Ponce de León in 1508.

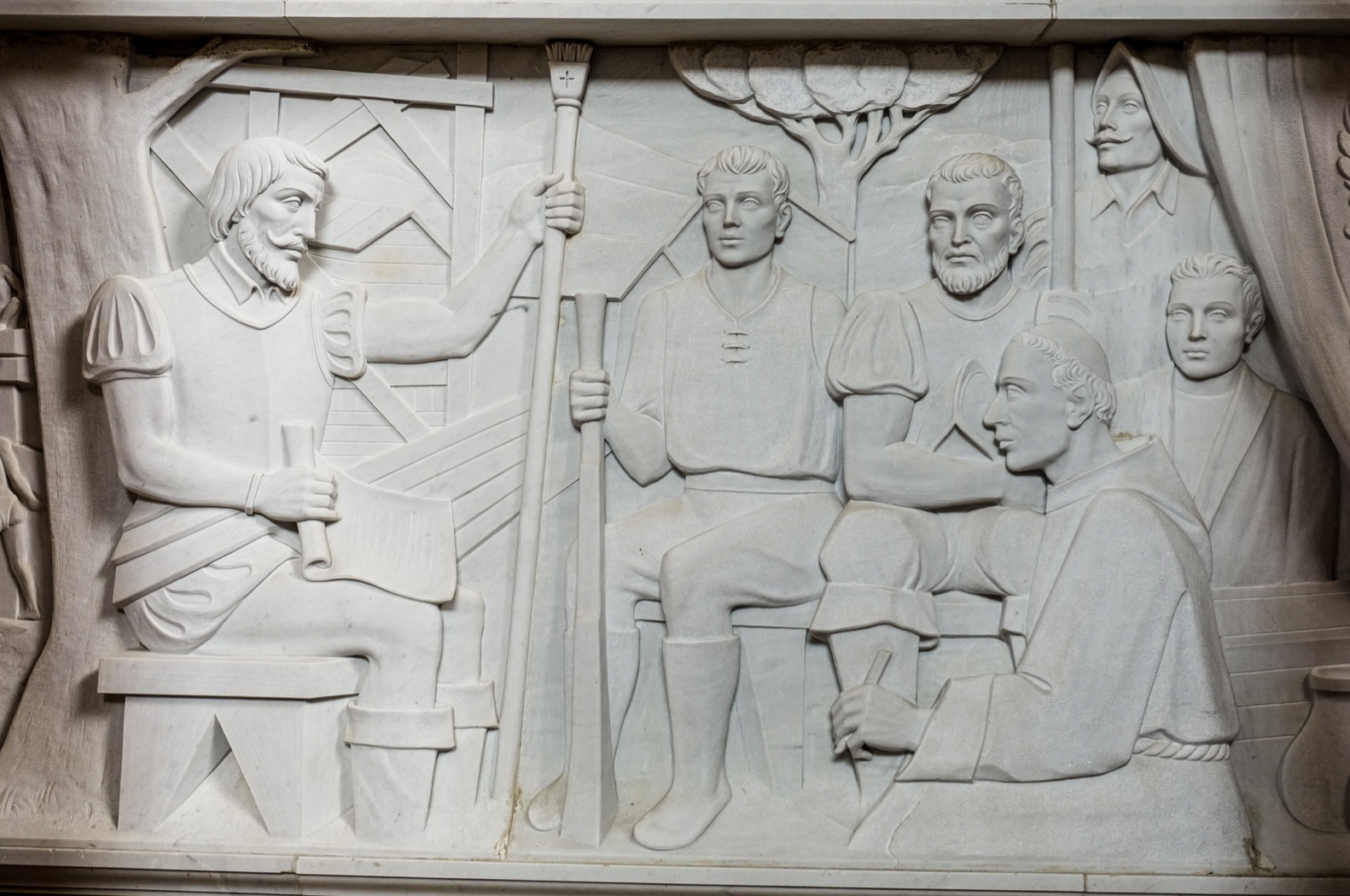
Second relief (north wall), 2024

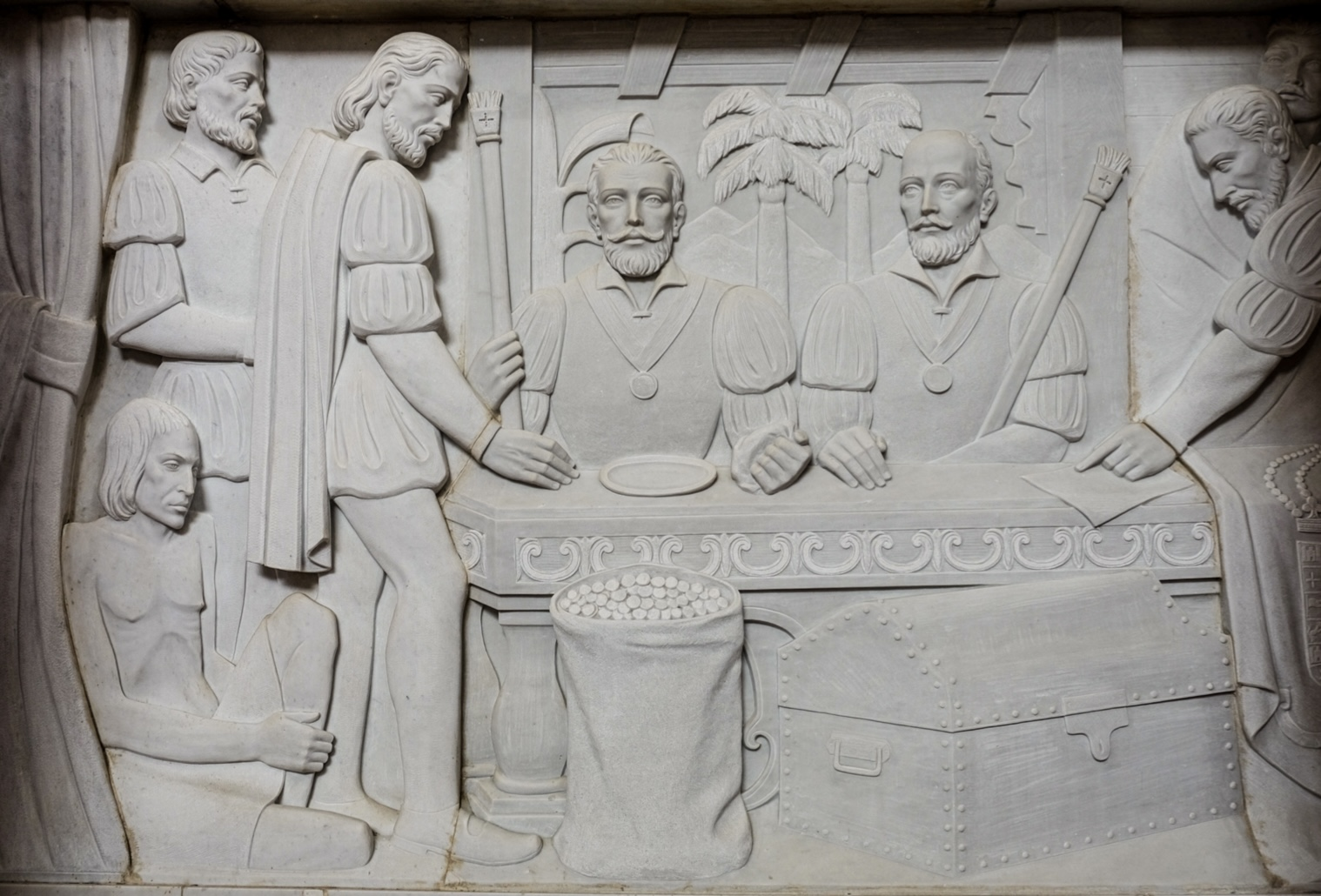
Third relief (north wall), 2024

The second panel on the north wall shows Ponce de León, first governor of Puerto Rico, appointed by the Spanish Crown, addressing the European people of the settlement, which are represented by a farmer, soldier, and friar. The third panel shows Ponce de León and other prominent leaders discussing the division of the main island into the two partidos of San Germán to the west and Caparra or Puerto Rico to the east. They are grouped around a table, in front of which lies a bag of gold pieces next to a kneeled Taíno man. This organization of the island remained effective from the administrative entities of the Viceroyalties of the Indies (1508–1535) and New Spain (1535–1582) to the establishment of the Captaincy General of Puerto Rico (1582–1898). All three panels were designed by muralist Rafael Ríos Rey.

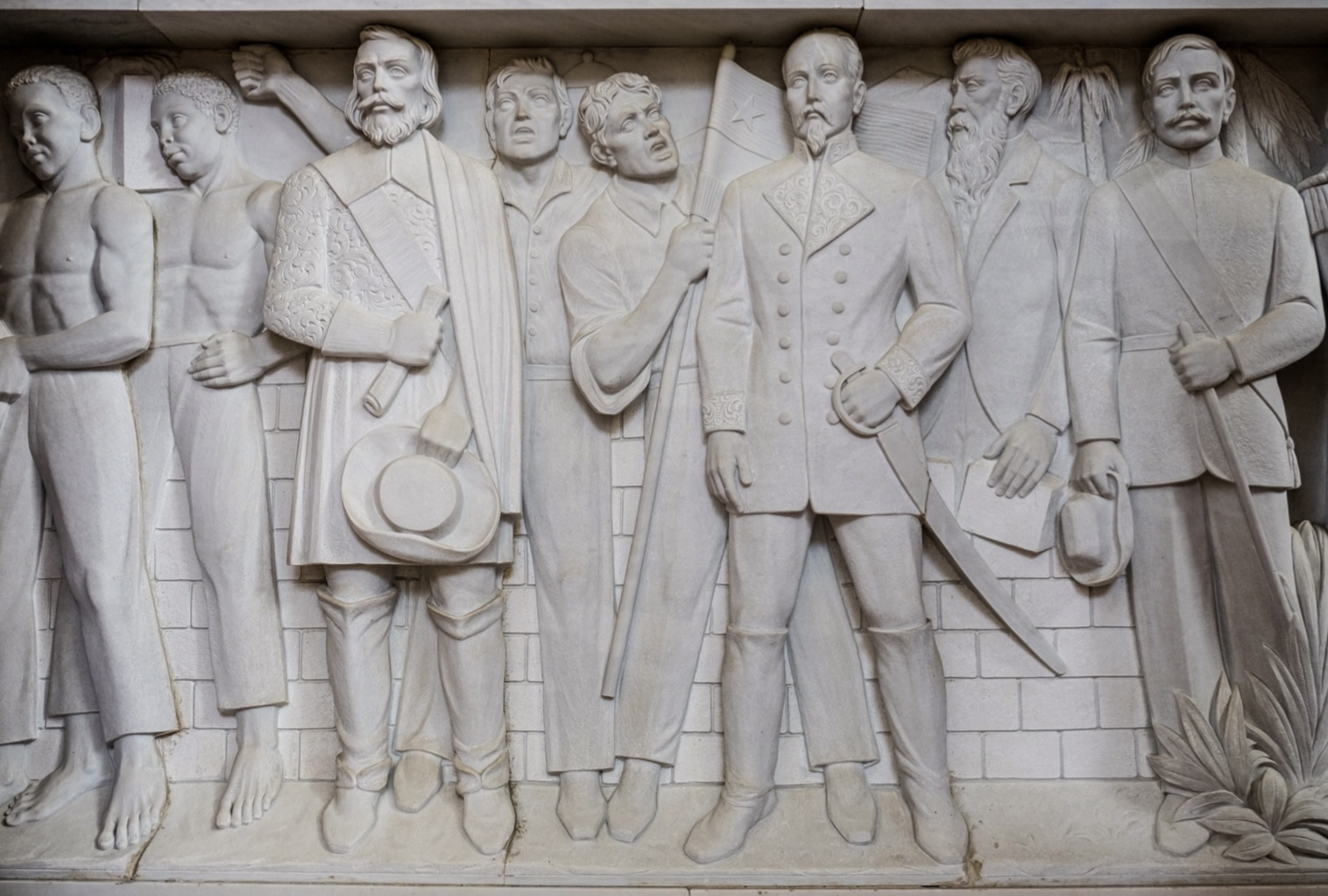
First relief (east wall), 2024

The relief panels on the east wall represent the administration of Puerto Rico under Spanish rule, specifically the evolution of autonomy within the archipelago and island. The first symbolizes the succession of military governors under the Captaincy General of Puerto Rico (1582–1898), who were appointed by the Spanish Crown and ruled by decree. In front of El Morro fortress, a symbol of Spanish imperial power, the panel shows to the left the first governor under the Captaincy, Captain Diego Menéndez de Valdés (1582–1593), who led the transformation of El Morro into a large citadel, next to two Sub-Saharan African slaves carrying building blocks, as they were the ones who largely built it.

In the center of the panel, it shows Governor General Julián Juan Pavía y Lacy (1867–1868), who led the repression against the Grito de Lares, the first major rebellion against Spanish rule, confronted on one side by an agitated rebel carrying the flag of Lares, and by leader of the rebellion Ramón Emeterio Betances on the other. Betances appears to be removing a building block from El Morro, symbolizing his attempt to liberate Puerto Rico from Spanish control. To the right of the panel, it appears the replacement of Pavía y Lacy, Governor General José Laureano Sanz y Posse (1868–1870), who, despite having released the prisoners involved in the rebellion, suppressed liberal circles, a condition that continued under his successors until the implementation of the Autonomy Charter of Puerto Rico in 1898.

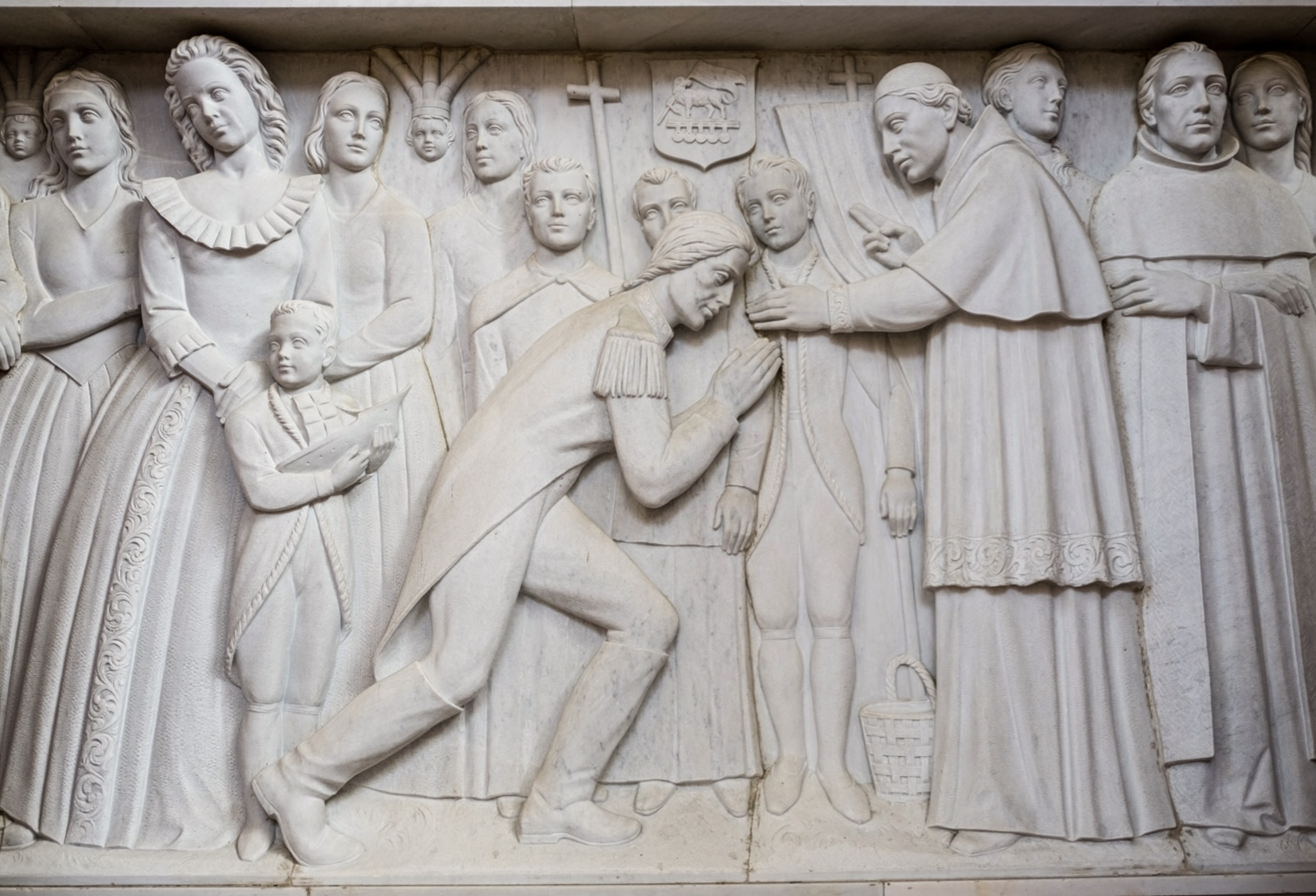
Second relief (east wall), 2024

The second panel represents the start of political representation for Puerto Rico in Spain. It shows Ramón Power y Giralt, the first Puerto Rican representative at the Spanish parliament, Cortes de Cadíz, receiving an episcopal ring from Bishop Juan Alejo de Arizmendi during his official farewell Mass. During the occupation of Spain by Napoleon, Power y Giralt went to represent Puerto Rico in 1810 at the Cortes, where as vice-president, he oversaw the establishment of the Spanish Constitution of 1812, which extended political rights for representation to overseas Spanish possessions, including Puerto Rico. However, these rights were soon abolished with the end of Napoleon's occupation and the restoration of the absolute Spanish monarchy under King Ferdinand VII in 1814.

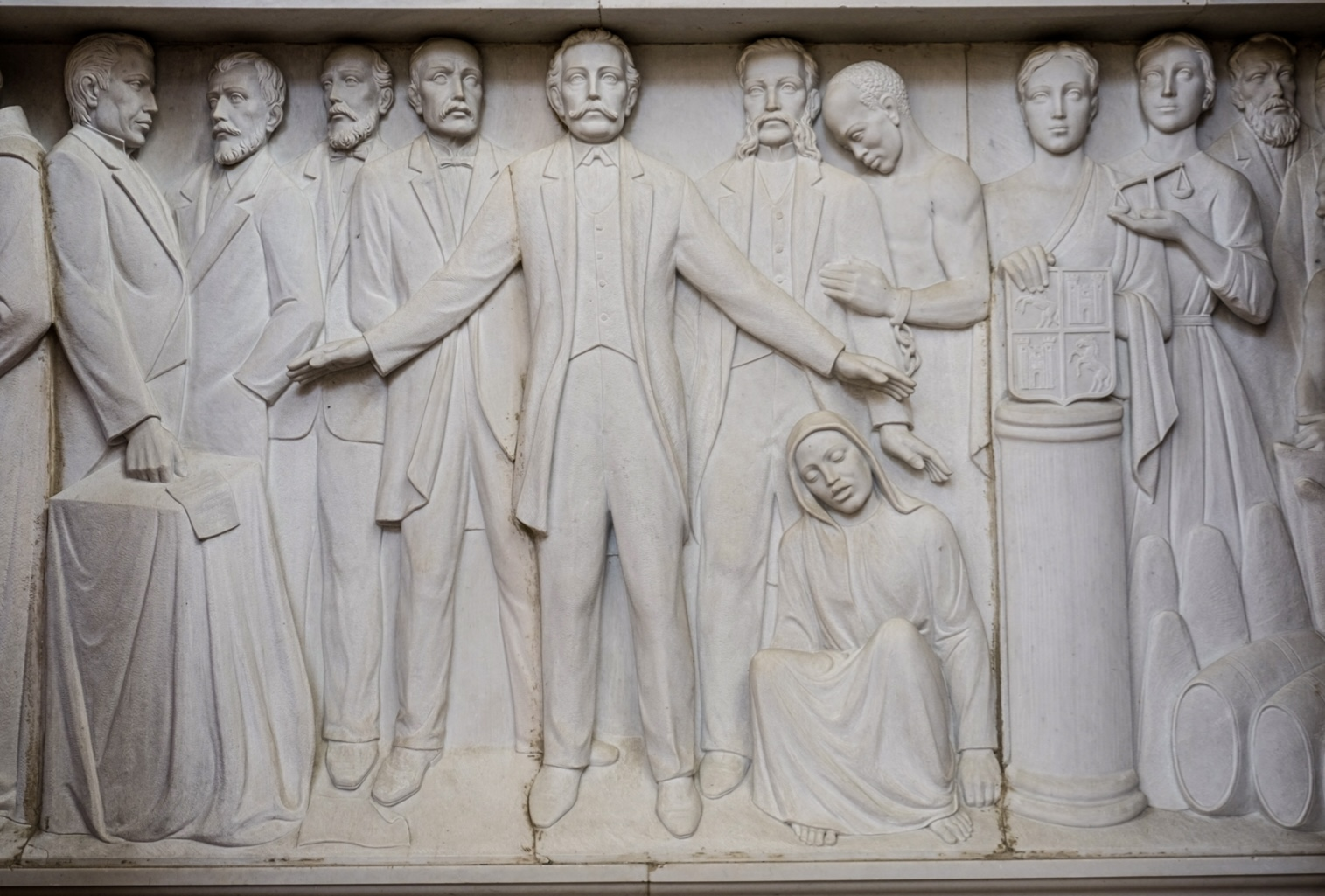
Third relief (east wall), 2024

The third panel shows representatives from Puerto Rico, namely Segundo Ruiz Belvis, Francisco Mariano Quiñones, and José Julián Acosta, at the Junta Informativa de Ultramar de 1866 (Overseas Information Junta), which was a commission convened by the Spanish government in Madrid to discuss and propose liberal reforms for the administration of Cuba and Puerto Rico, its remaining possessions in the Americas. The men appear alongside a chained Sub-Saharan African slave and a woman holding a scale of justice, as they propose the abolition of slavery, and greater political and economic freedom. Despite their efforts, Spain failed to recognize any of their petitions. All three reliefs panels were designed by painter José R. Oliver.

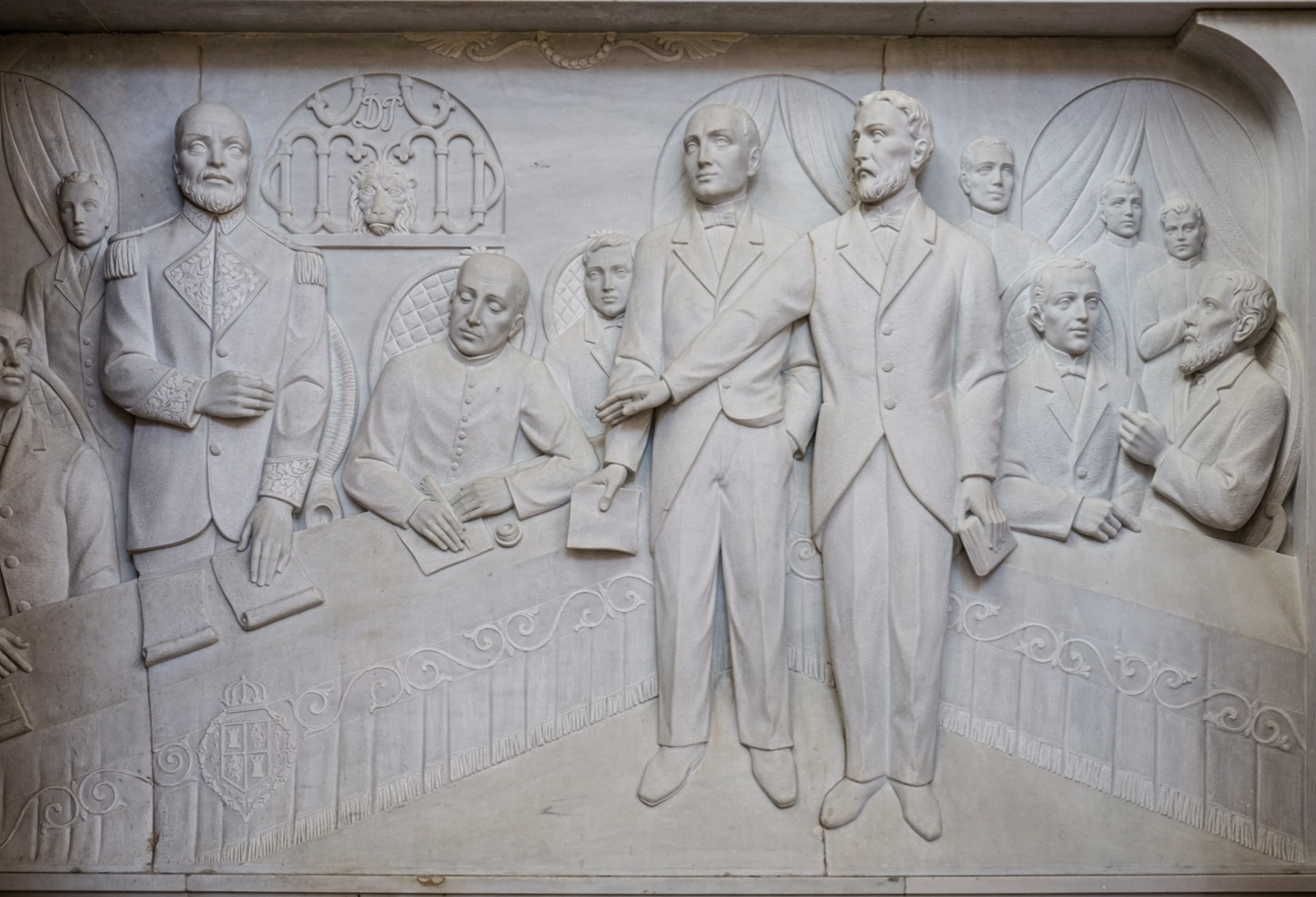
First relief (south wall), 2024

The reliefs panels on the south wall represent the continuation of the struggle of Puerto Rico for greater autonomy until the annexation of the archipelago and island by the United States in 1898. The first panel symbolizes the Provincial Deputation of Puerto Rico, a local elected administrative body which represented Puerto Rico as a province, not colony, of Spain at the Spanish Parliament, Cortes Generales, during intermittent Spanish liberal periods from the establishment of the Spanish Constitution of 1812 to the end of the First Spanish Republic in 1873. The body convened three times: 1813 after the start Spanish Constitution of 1812 in the midst of the Peninsular War triggered by Napoleon’s invasion of Spain, 1869 after the start of Spanish Constitution of 1869 during the Provisional Government established after the Glorious Revolution deposed Queen Isabella II, and 1871 after the start of Ley de la Diputación Provincial de 1870 (Law of the Provincial Deputation of 1870) during the reign of the elected King Amadeo I of Spain, whose abdication in 1873 resulted in the establishment of the First Spanish Republic.

The panel shows the inauguration of the third convening of the body in 1871. It depicts members Pedro Gerónimo Goyco and Julián E. Blanco in standing in the center, José de Celis Aguilera and Nicolás Aguayo seating in the extreme left, and José Gualberto Padilla and others entering from the right inside their headquarters, the Provincial Deputation Palace in the historic district of Old San Juan. The building served as the seat of the Chambers of Delegates under the Spanish Autonomous Charter in 1898 and the American Foraker Act between 1900 and 1917, and the Legislative Assembly under the Jones–Shafroth Act between 1917 and 1929, when they relocated to the newly built Capitol of Puerto Rico. Although Puerto Rican representatives to the Spanish parliament achieved liberal policies during this period, efforts for further reforms came to an end in 1874, when the Spanish Republic was replaced by the restored Spanish monarchy.

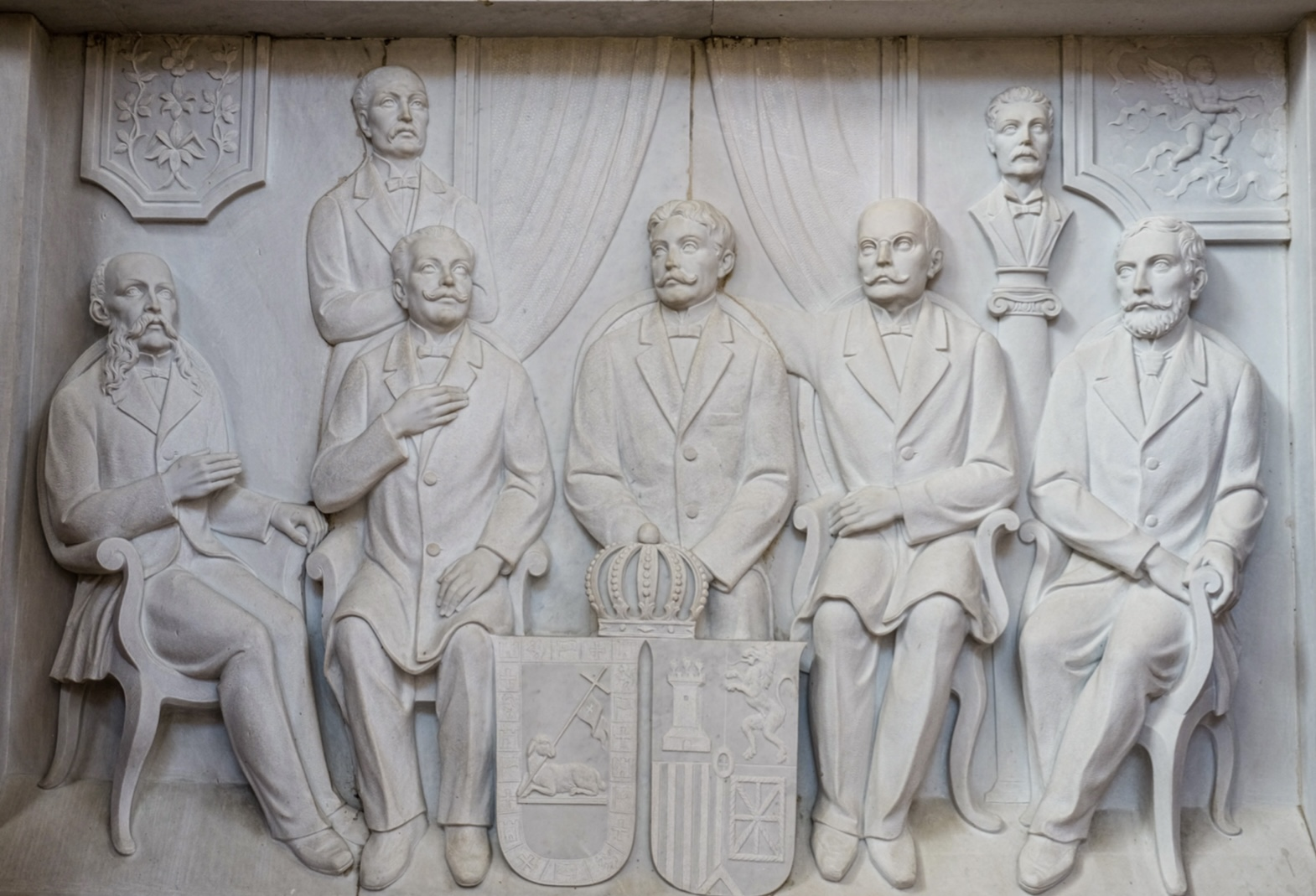
Second relief (south wall), 2024

The second panel represents the autonomous government established by the Autonomous Charter in 1897. Under the statute of autonomy, the Spanish Crown, through Prime Minister Práxedes Mateo Sagasta, granted local autonomous administration to Puerto Rico, authorizing the establishment of the Autonomous Province of Puerto Rico, with a government headed by a partially democratically elected bicameral parliament and a governor, who remained an appointee of the Crown, but was to be advised by an executive cabinet of his own choosing. The panel shows the first members of the cabinet of the autonomous government, who were sworn in February 1898. Sitting from left to right in front of a table with the coat of arms Puerto Rico and Spain, it depicts José Severo Quiñones (Agriculture, Industry and Commerce), Manuel Fernández Juncos (Treasury), Luis Muñoz Rivera (Government and Grace and Justice), Francisco Mariano Quiñones (president), and Juan Hernández López (Public Works and Communications), while Manuel F. Rossy (Public Instruction) is featured standing. In the background, the appears a bust of Román Baldorioty de Castro, the founder of the autonomist movement in Puerto Rico.

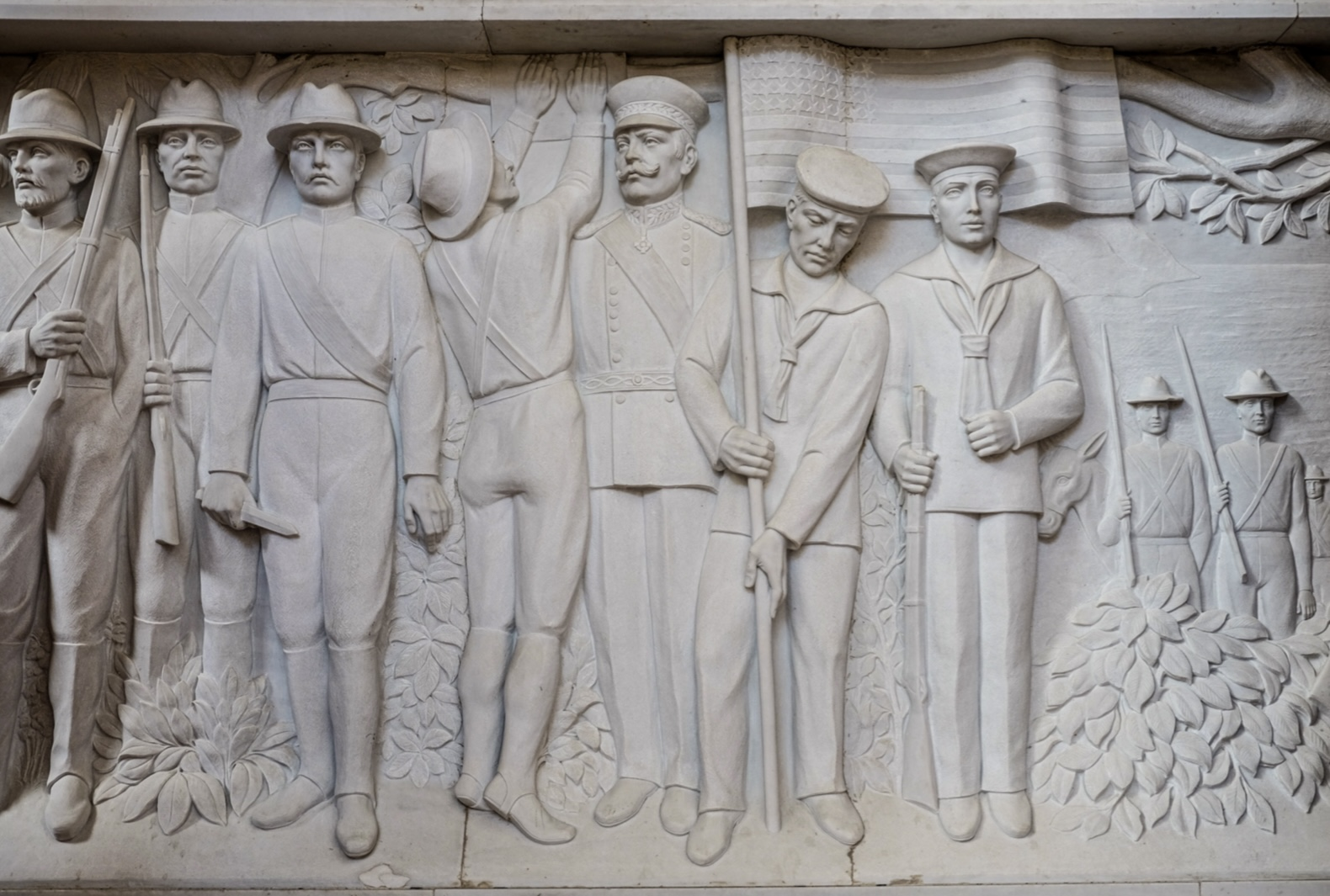
Third relief (south wall), 2024

The third panel symbolizes the annexation of Puerto Rico by the United States during the Spanish–American War in 1898. It shows armed soldiers of the United States Army under the command of General Nelson A. Miles landing with an American flag in the southwestern municipality of Guánica on July 25, 1898. In the background is Guánica Bay, the same location through which the first European explorer, conquistador, and governor of Puerto Rico, Juan Ponce de León, first landed in Puerto Rico 390 years earlier, on August 12, 1508. After an armistice, a cease-fire agreement, was signed on August 12, 1898, the active hostilities between Spain and the United States stopped, with the war officially ending by the signing of the Treaty of Paris on December 10, 1898. The armistice led to Spain ceding Cuba, Puerto Rico, and Guam to the United States and agreed to the American occupation of Manila in the Philippines. The Spanish Empire rule of Puerto Rico effectively ended on October 18, when the United States assumed sovereignty over the territory, establishing the Military Government of Porto Rico (the spelling "Porto Rico" was officially used by U.S. government until 1932). Oliver also designed all three panels on the south wall.

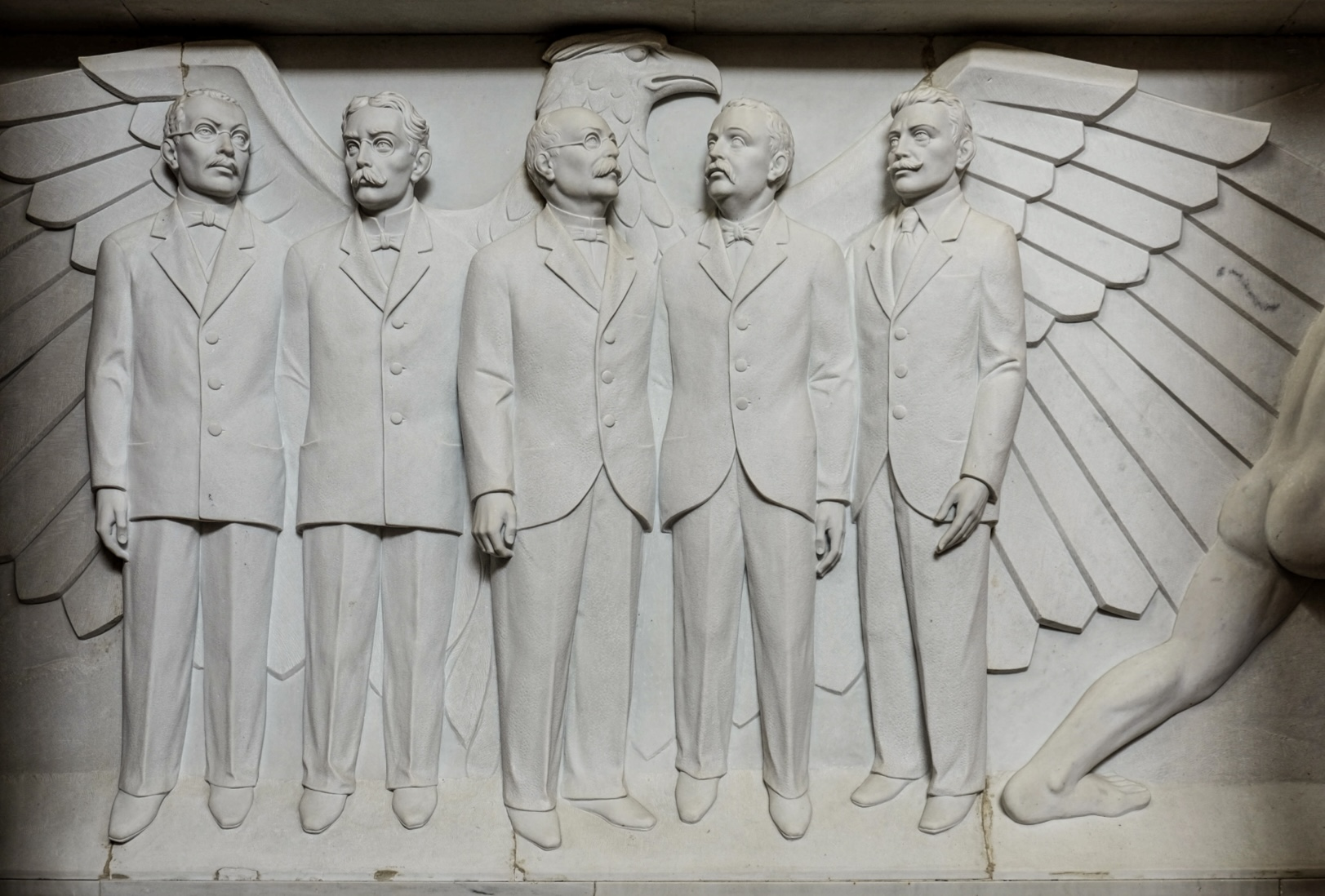
First relief (west wall), 2024

The reliefs panels on the west wall represents the continuation of the association of Puerto Rico with the United States to the present status of unincorporated territory with constitutional self-government under American sovereignty. The first panel symbolizes the establishment of civil governance as the Insular Government of Porto Rico under the Foraker Act of 1900. The Act divided the local government of Puerto Rico into three branches: an executive, consisting of a Governor and an 11-member Executive Council appointed by the President of the United States, a legislative, composed of bicameral Legislative Assembly, with the Executive Council as its upper chamber and a 35-member House of Delegates elected by the residents of Puerto Rico as its lower chamber, and a judicial, headed by a chief justice and a district judge appointed by the President. The Act also created the office of Resident Commissioner, a non-voting member to the United States House of Representatives elected by the residents of Puerto Rico. The panel shows the first six Puerto Rican members of the Executive Council, namely José Celso Barbosa, Manuel Camuñas Crauz, Rosendo Matienzo Cintrón, Andres Crosas O’Ferrall, and José De Diego (standing from left to right) in front of a large Bald eagle, symbol of the federal government of the United States.

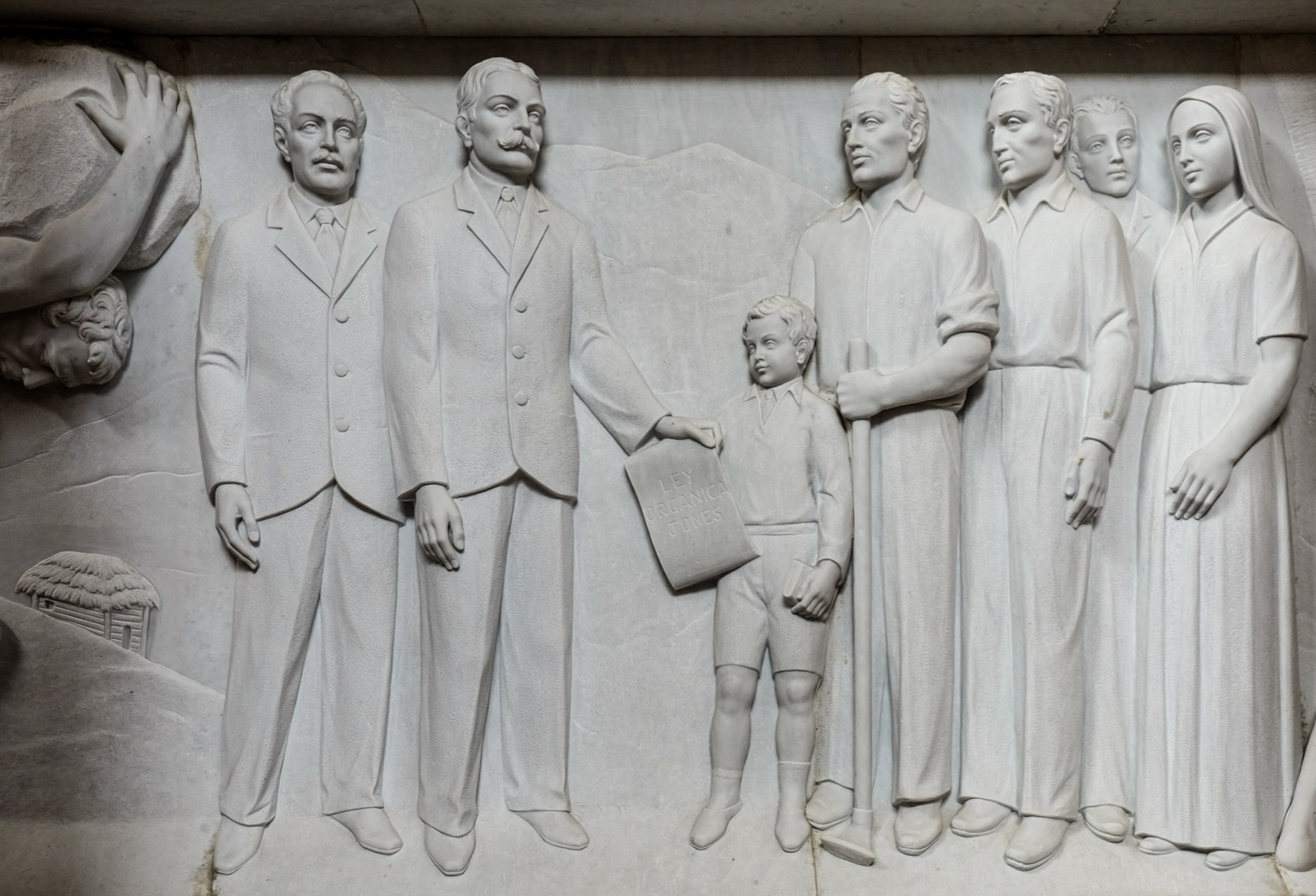
Second relief (west wall), 2024

The second panel symbolizes the expansion of civil governance as the Insular Government of Porto Rico under the Jones–Shafroth Act of 1917. The Act established a bill of rights based on the United States Bill of Rights and granted statutory birthright United States citizenship to anyone born in the archipelago and island of Puerto Rico on or after April 11, 1899. It also expanded the executive and legislative branches government. It the executive departments of Justice, Education, Finance, Interior, Labor and Agriculture, and Health, with their heads, the first two appointed by the President of the United States, and the rest appointed by the Governor, who was also appointed by the President, forming an Executive Council to the Governor. It formed a legislative 19-member Senate elected by the residents of Puerto Rico, and increased the membership and term length of the House of Representatives to 39 popularly elected members serving four-year terms. It also increased to four years the term length of the Resident Commissioner, a non-voting member to the United States House of Representatives elected by the residents of Puerto Rico. The panel shows the President of Senate of Puerto Rico Antonio Rafael Barceló and Resident Commissioner Luis Muñoz Rivera in the countryside handing a piece paper with the words "Ley Orgánica Jones" ("Jones Organic Law") to a child surrounded by a group of farmers or Jíbaros, who represent the people of Puerto Rico. A bohío, the traditional, simple, one-room hut constructed with natural, local materials like wooden poles, woven straw, and palm leaf thatched roofs, appears on the background.

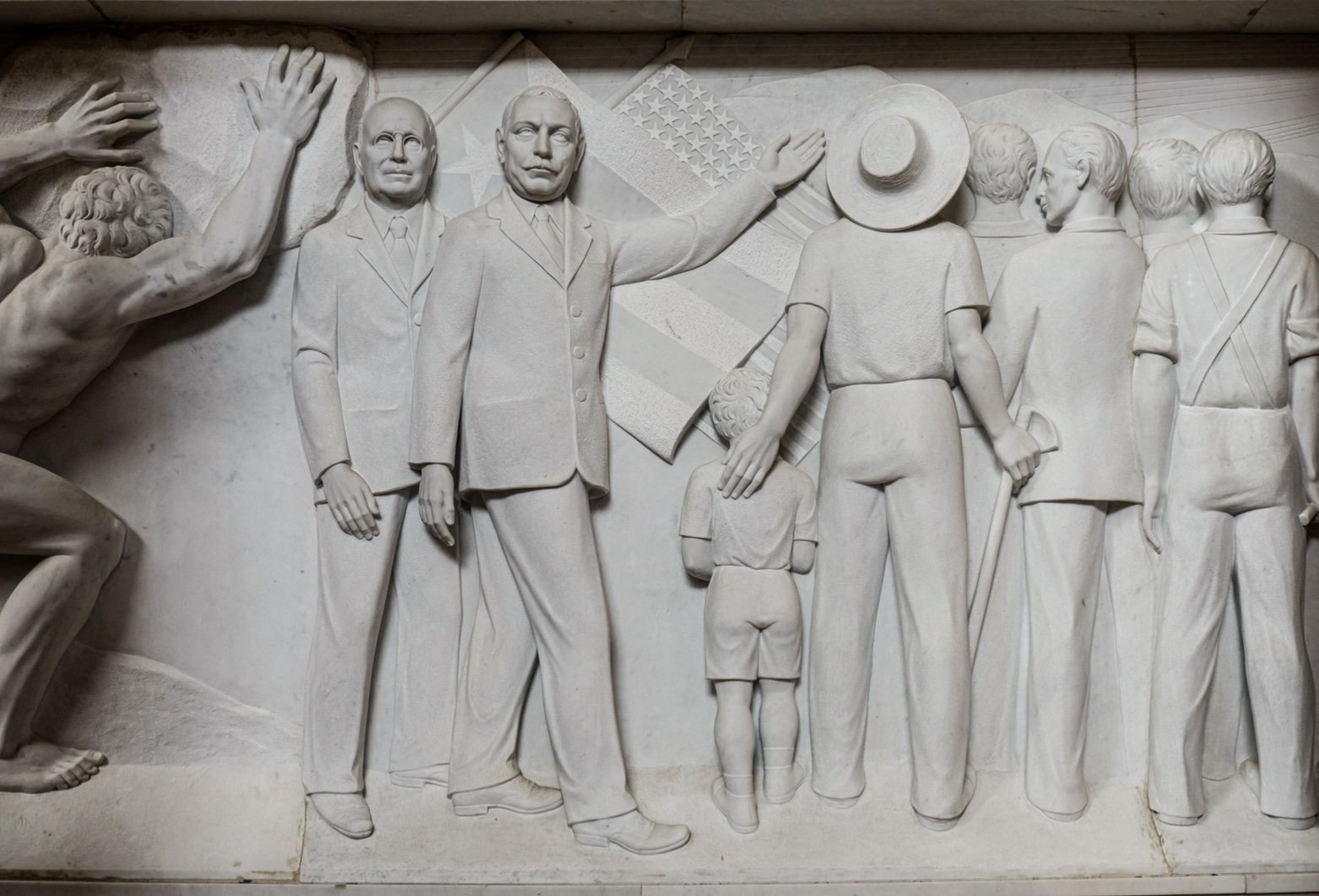
Third relief (west wall), 2024

The third panel symbolizes the current status as the Commonwealth of Puerto Rico (Spanish: Estado Libre Asociado de Puerto Rico, lit. 'Free Associated State of Puerto Rico'), which was established under the Constitution of Puerto Rico on July 25, 1952. With the ratification of the constitution, the full authority and responsibility for the local government of Puerto Rico was vested in the residents of Puerto Rico, resulting in complete self-governance within the archipelago and island. The panel shows the architect of this political framework and first elected governor of Puerto Rico Luis Muñoz Marín and Resident Commissioner Antonio Fernós lsern leading a group of citizens, who are looking towards the flags of Puerto Rico and the United States over the mountains of the main island. Together, the panels also include a progressive representation of the Greek mythological figure of Sisyphus carrying the rock, likely symbolizing the endless struggle for autonomy in Puerto Rico. All three reliefs were designed by muralist and painter Jorge Rechany.

==== Pendentive mosaics ====
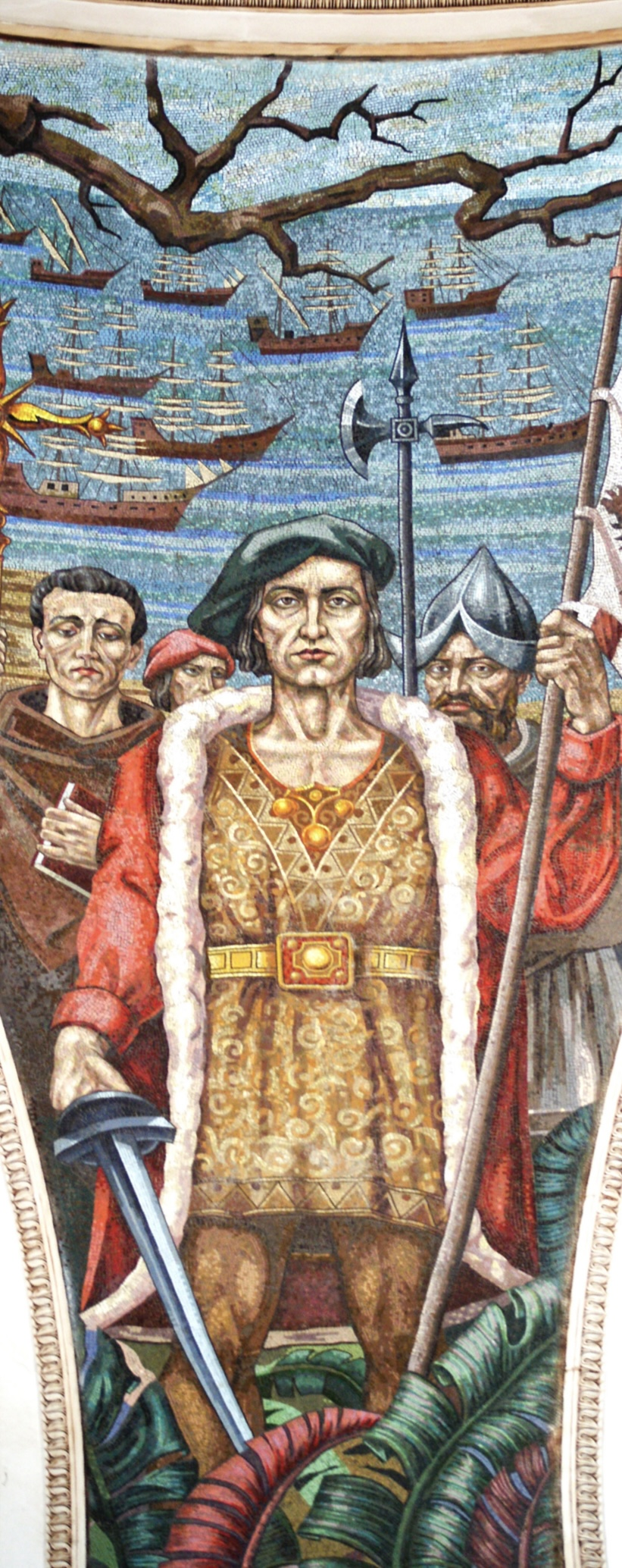
Northwestern pendentive mosaic, 2024

The pendentives supporting the dome are adorned with mosaics, each one representing an important event in the history of Puerto Rico. Symbolizing the European discovery of the archipelago and island by Christopher Columbus during his second voyage to the Americas in 1493, the northwestern pendentive features the landing of Columbus between the western municipalities of Añasco and Aguadilla on November 19. Columbus appears in the center with a Franciscan friar raising a cross, and a Spanish soldier flying the flag of the Catholic Monarchs of Spain, Fernando and Isabel, who sponsored the expeditionary fleet that is depicted in the background. It was created by muralist Rafael Ríos Rey.

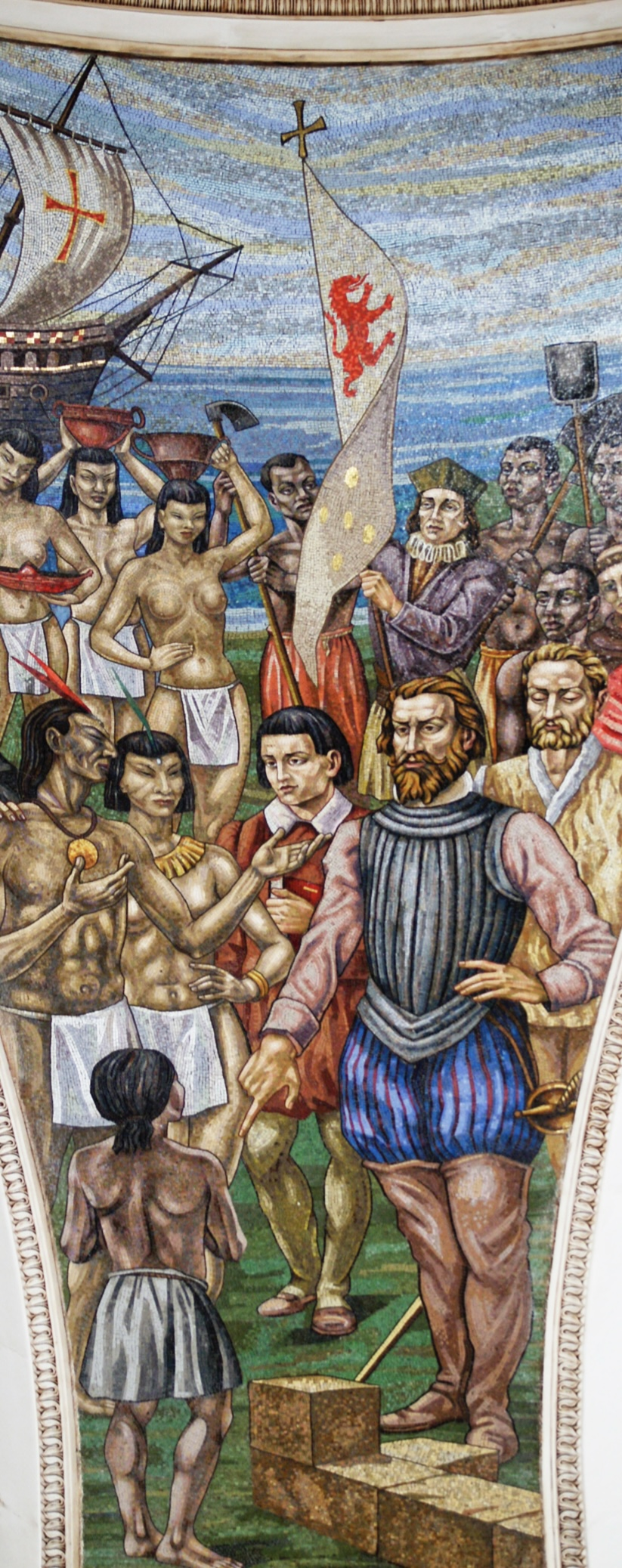
Northeastern pendentive mosaic, 2024

Featuring the establishment of the village of Caparra or the city of Puerto Rico, the first European settlement in the main island, by Juan Ponce de León in 1508, the northeastern pendentive represents the European conquest and colonization of the archipelago. It shows Ponce de León with fellow Spanish officers communicating with the Taíno, the indigenous people of Puerto Rico. Behind them, a group of Sub-Saharan African slaves with farming tools and Taíno women with offerings are depicted alongside a Spanish soldier flying the flag of the Catholic Monarchs. The mosaic symbolizes the integration of the three races from which the people of Puerto Rico primarily descend. It was created by painter José R. Oliver.

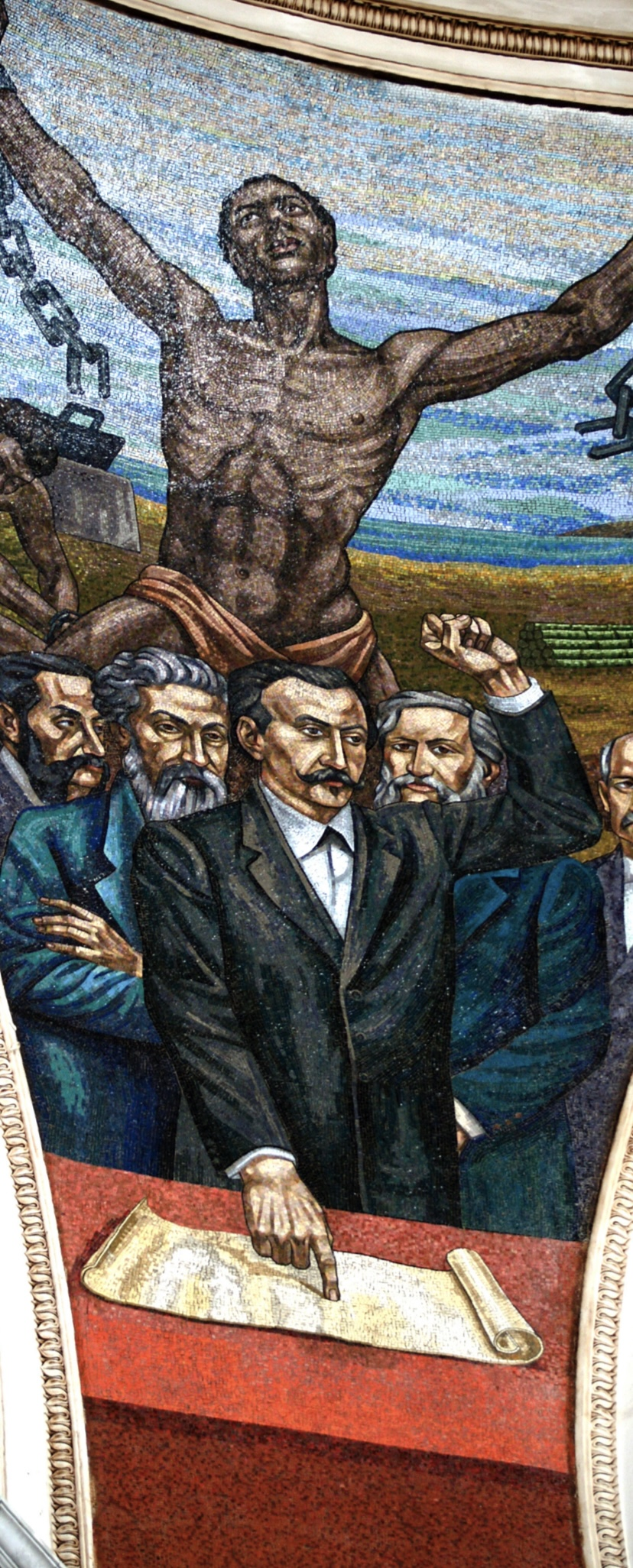
Southeastern pendentive mosaic, 2024

The southeastern pendentive represents the abolition of slavery in Puerto Rico, declared on March 22, 1873. It shows a Sub-Saharan African slave breaking out of his chain with both arms raised over his head. On both sides, he is flanked by a fellow slave, kneeling chained on the burned field of a sugarcane plantation. Below them, a group of prominent abolitionists, namely Segundo Ruiz Belvis, Ramón Emeterio Betances, José Julián Acosta, Francisco Mariano Quiñones, Julio Vizcarrondo, and Ramán Baldoroty de Castro, stand behind a table with the proclamation document. It was created by painter Rafael Tufiño.

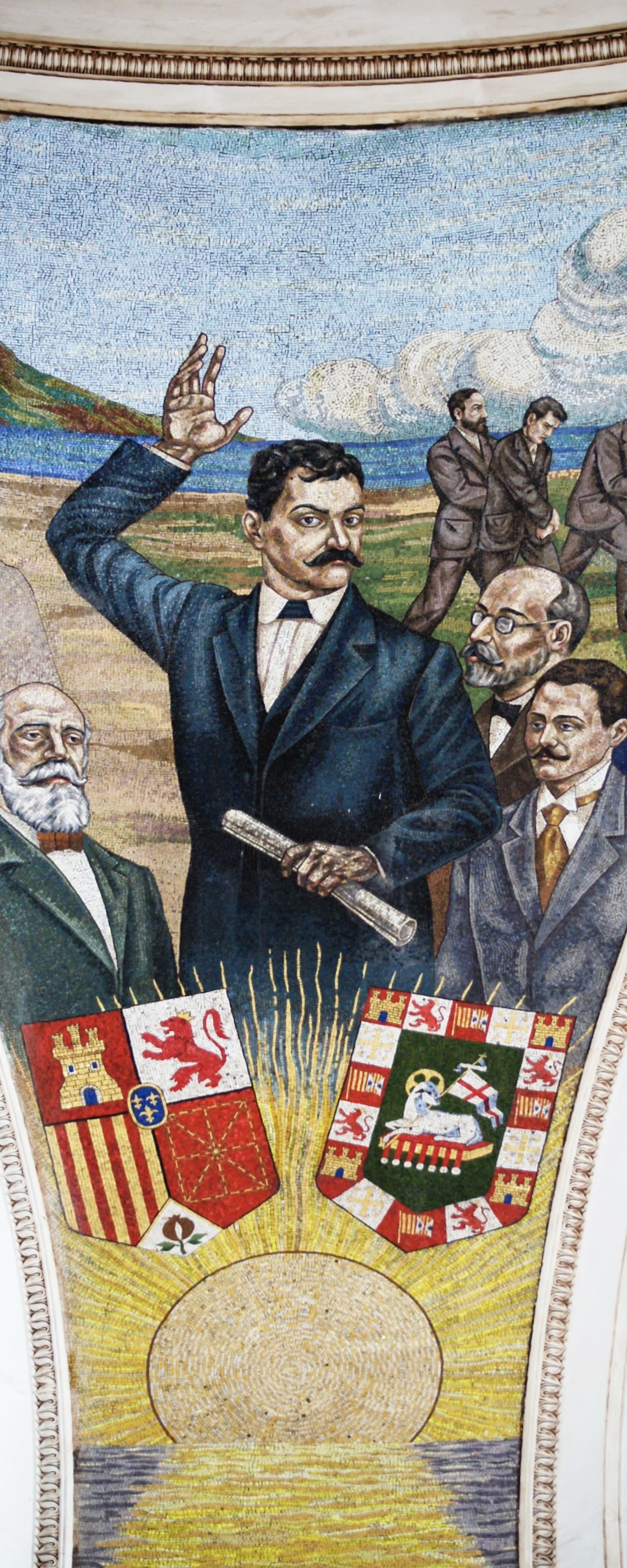
Southwestern pendentive mosaic, 2024

The southwestern pendentive is representative of the Autonomist Movement of 1887, which sought to establish an autonomous government for Puerto Rico under the jurisdiction of the Spanish Empire, advocating self-rule, but not independence from Spain. It shows leader Luis Muñoz Rivera, who achieved the first autonomous government for Puerto Rico in 1897 under the administration of Spanish Prime Minister Práxedes Mateo Sagasta, in the center in front of rising sun over the sea accompanied by the coats of arms of Spain and Puerto Rico.

Muñoz Rivera appears alongside fellow prominent advocates of autonomy. On the left, his mentor, Ramán Baldorioty de Castro, who is recognized as The Father of Puerto Rican Autonomy, and Rafael María de Labra are pictured in front of the seat of the Autonomist Party of Puerto Rico, the Teatro La Perla, located in the south-central municipality of Ponce. On the right, Federico Degetau, José Gómez Brioso, and Rosendo Matienzo Cintrón are depicted in front of three fellow autonomists, who are being escorted to El Morro Fortress (also pictured) in the historic district of Old San Juan, then capital of Puerto Rico, which is where many leaders of the movement were imprisoned and tortured during the governorship of General Romualdo Palacio. It was created by painter and muralist Jorge Rechany.

==== Dome reliefs and mosaics ====
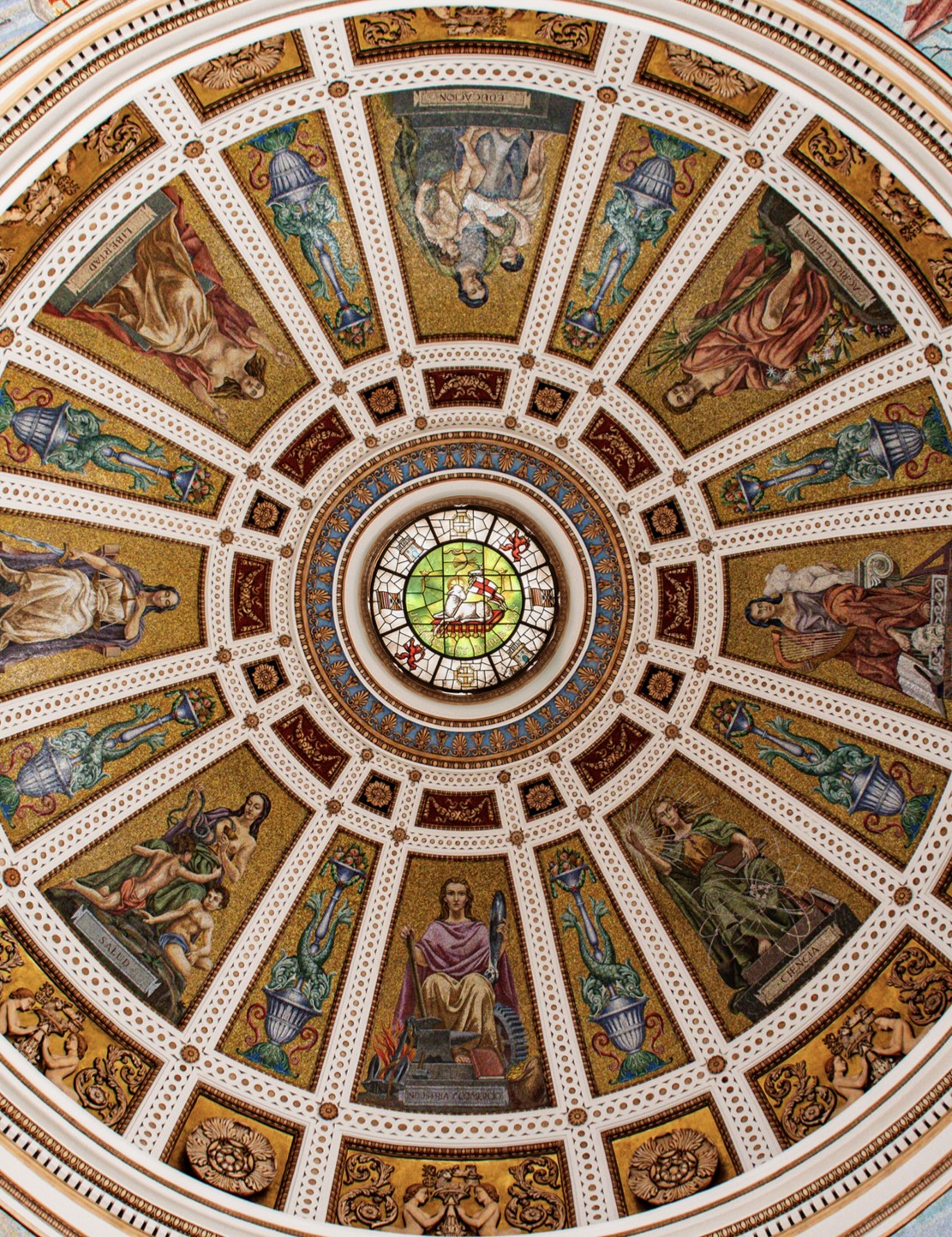
Dome mosaics and reliefs, 2024

Around the bottom rim of the dome and immediately below mosaics with the Greek muses, there are a series of panels with a background of 22-carat gold slats, each one containing a golden plaster and polychrome relief depicting two Greek sirens holding a pedestal on which rest the symbols of the Great Seal of Puerto Rico. The sirens symbolize the North Atlantic Ocean and the Caribbean Sea, the two bodies of water surrounding Puerto Rico, and the Great Seal symbolizes the archipelago and island.

Around the center of the dome and immediately above the Greek sirens, the ceiling of the dome is decorated with 16 mosaics, of which 8 feature an individual Greek muse representing freedom, education, agriculture, arts and letters, science, industry and commerce, health and justice, all fundamental values for the government and people of Puerto Rico.

== Restoration ==
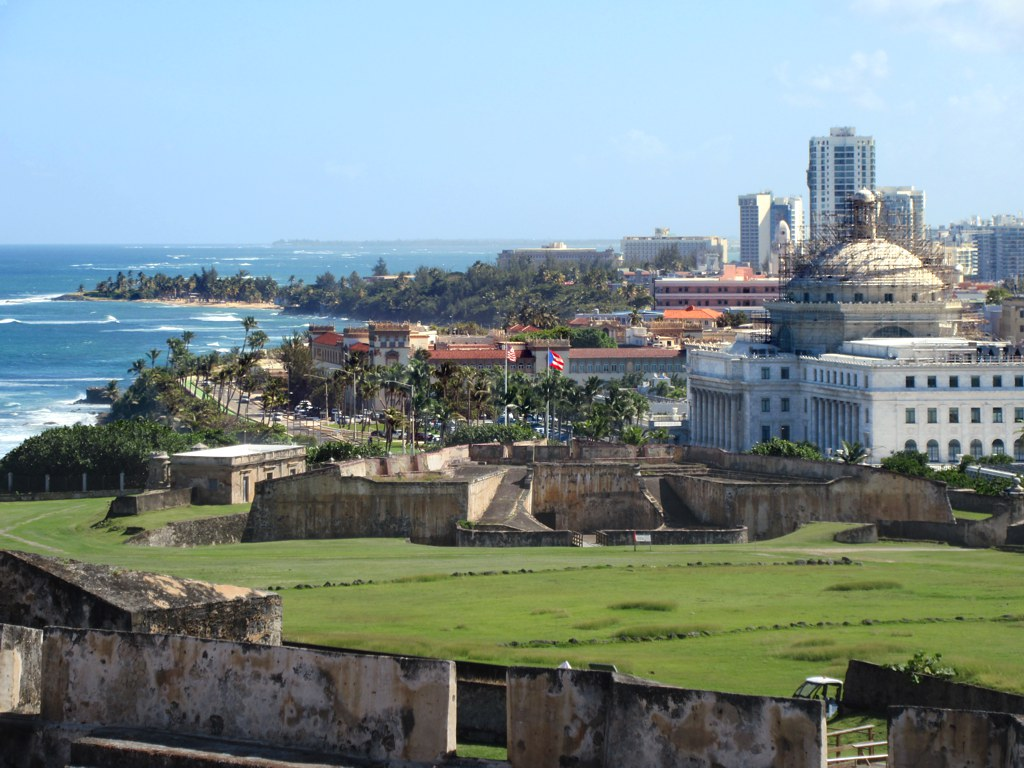
The Capitol under renovation, 2022

The Capitol of Puerto Rico was last restored from 2022 to 2024, with repairs made to the dome and façade by Puerto Rican firm PQC Architectural Studio LLC. The firm won two awards for their restoration work at the ACI Excellence in Concrete Construction Awards 2025.

== Building complex ==
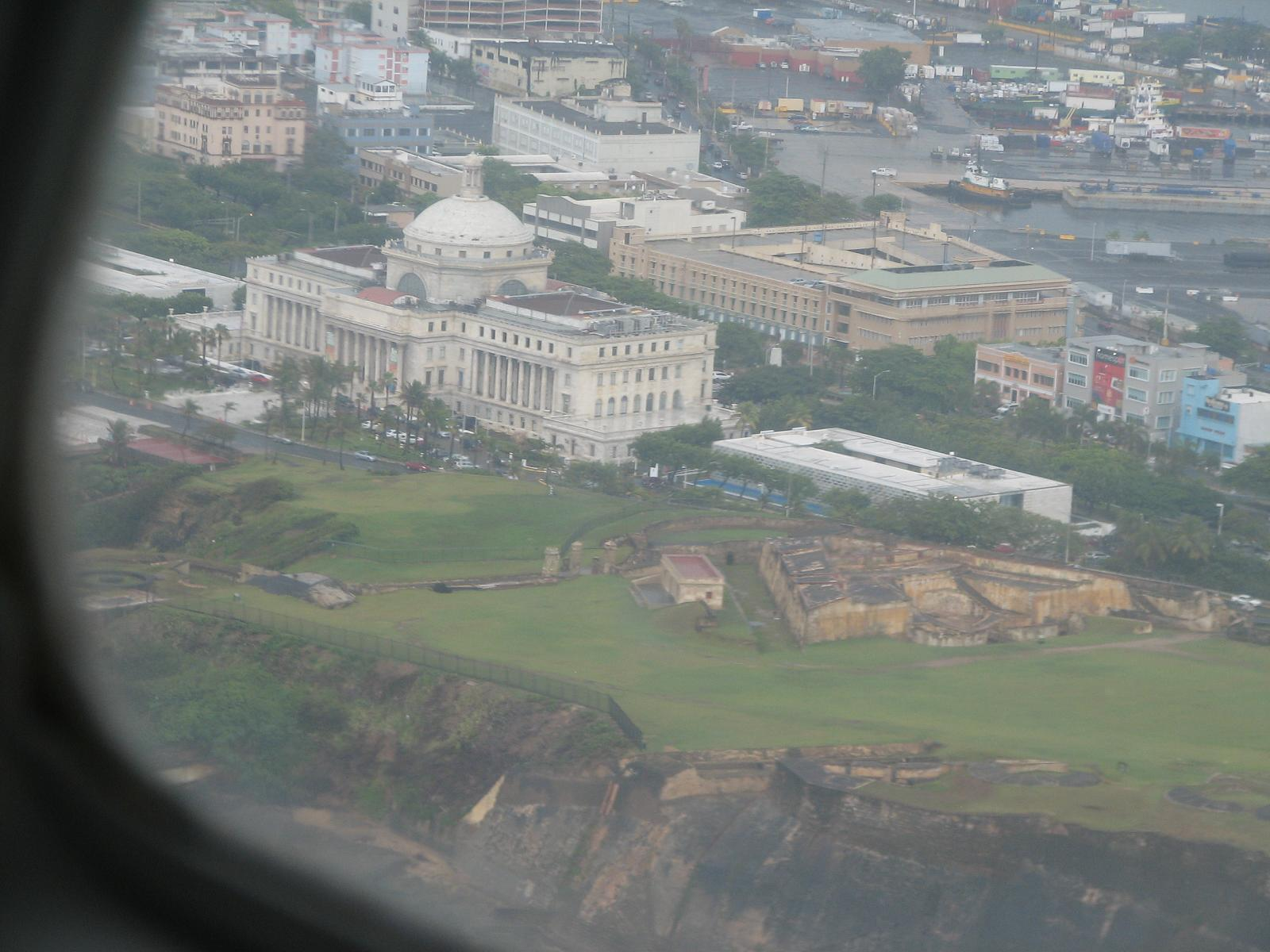
Aerial view of some of the buildings of the Capitol building complex from the Atlantic Ocean, 2009

The immediate area surrounding the Capitol is known as the Distrito Capitalino (Capitol District), which is a disconnected building complex composed of early- to mid-20th-century structures of varying architectural styles around the Capitol. The district also contains two public squares facing the north façade of the Capitol and a landscaped park facing the south façade, all serving as a center of patriotism and civic virtues.

=== Annex buildings ===
The Capitol has two annex buildings functioning as office space for legislators, discreetly located within the immediate east and west grounds of the Capitol, which were originally reserved for gardens. The Rafael Martínez Nadal Building serves as the Senate Annex on the eastern Senate side of the Capitol with offices for senators and two hearing rooms, and the Ernesto Ramos Antonini Building serves as the House Annex on the western House side of the Capitol with offices for representatives as well as hearing rooms.

These identical buildings were constructed in a Tropical Modern, International style by the Toro Ferrer firm in 1955. Each two-story building has a low-lying rectangular plan with a flat roof, and their exterior features strip windows with aluminum sunshades, glass panes, and marble facing. All spaces are laid along an interior courtyard with landscaped areas, reflecting pools, and two entrance lobbies at each end.

=== Other buildings ===
Several buildings bordering the immediate grounds of the Capitol are also part of its complex. Located next to the Senate Annex on the eastern side of the Captiol, the Mediterranean Revival Antonio R. Barceló Building, seat of the former School of Tropical Medicine, houses the Legislative Library, as well as offices for the House and Senate, Legislative Services, Superintendent of the Capitol, and Resident Commissioner of Puerto Rico.

Located to the direct south of the Capitol, the Art Deco Luis A. Ferré Building contains offices for both chambers, as well as a 700 space parking garage. Located to the southeast of the Capitol, the Art Deco Baltazar Corrada del Río Building houses legislative and administrative offices of the Senate, while the Art Deco building of the Antiguo Cuartel de la Policia Insular (Old Headquarters of the Insular Police), the former home of the State Commission of Elections, accommodates House archives, as well as administrative offices. Located to the southwest of the Capitol, the International Style Ramón Mellado Parsons Building is reserved for Senate offices.

=== Public squares ===
The Capitol building complex has two large, open squares serving as centers of patriotism and civic virtues, located between the main (north) façade of the Capitol of Puerto Rico and the North Atlantic Ocean. Known as the Plaza de la Democracia (Democracy Square), the first is situated between the northern main entrance of the Capitol and Luis Muñoz Rivera Avenue. The space, which has a square plan and marble flooring, contains a flagpole for a flag of the United States on its eastern side and another for a flag of Puerto Rico on its western side. It is also flanked on either side by a green lawn with high, narrow palm trees.

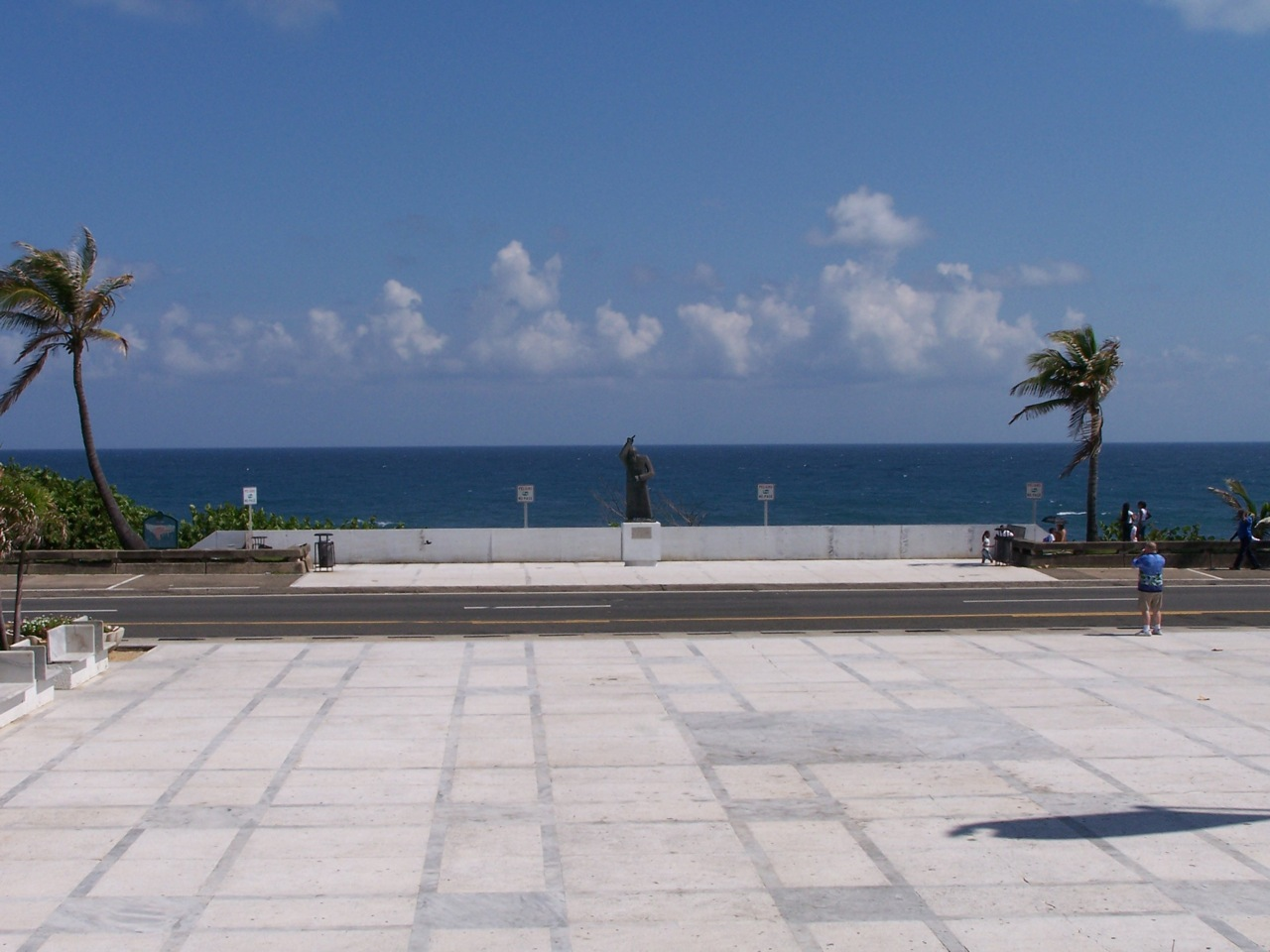
Old Plaza de la Democracia and Plaza San Juan Bautista facing the north façade of the Capitol overlooking the North Atlantic Ocean, 2006

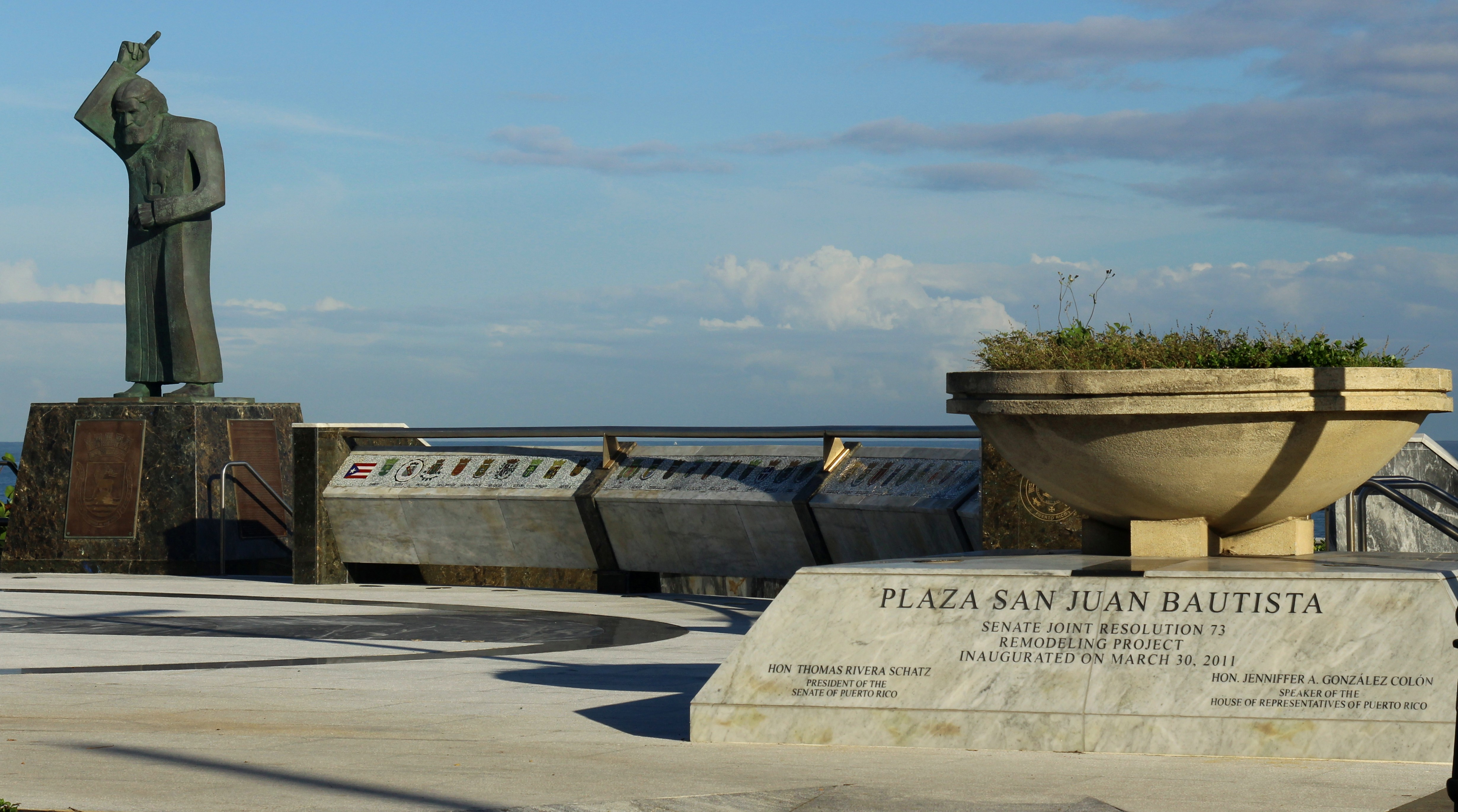
Renovated Plaza San Juan Bautista facing the north façade of the Capitol overlooking the North Atlantic Ocean, 2017

Following the direction of the first, the second square is situated between Luis Muñoz Rivera Avenue and the North Atlantic Ocean next to the grounds of the San Cristóbal Fortress in the historic quarter of Old San Juan. Perched over the northern cliffs of San Juan Islet with a semicircular plan and marble finishes throughout, the square is known as the Plaza San Juan Bautista (San Juan Bautista Square) after John the Baptist, the patron saint of San Juan, the capital municipality of Puerto Rico, which was first named San Juan Bautista ("Saint John Baptist") or San Juan ("Saint John") by Christopher Columbus, when the European explorer discovered the main island during his second voyage in 1493. In the center of the square, lies a large, abstract bronze sculpture of John the Baptist surrounded by a low-lying, semicircular pedestal containing the coats of arms of the 78 municipalities composing Puerto Rico.

=== Landscaped park ===
In the center of the Capitol building complex lies an elongated, landscaped park facing the rear (south) façade of the Capitol in-between Juan Ponce de León Avenue in the north and Paseo Covadonga (Covadonga Promenade) in the south from Calle Esteves (Esteves Road) in the east to Calle Gral. Contreras (Gral. Contreras Road) in the west. Containing various memorials, sculptures, statues, and plaques to individuals and events significant to Puerto Rican history, the park serves as a commemorative center of patriotism and civic virtues.

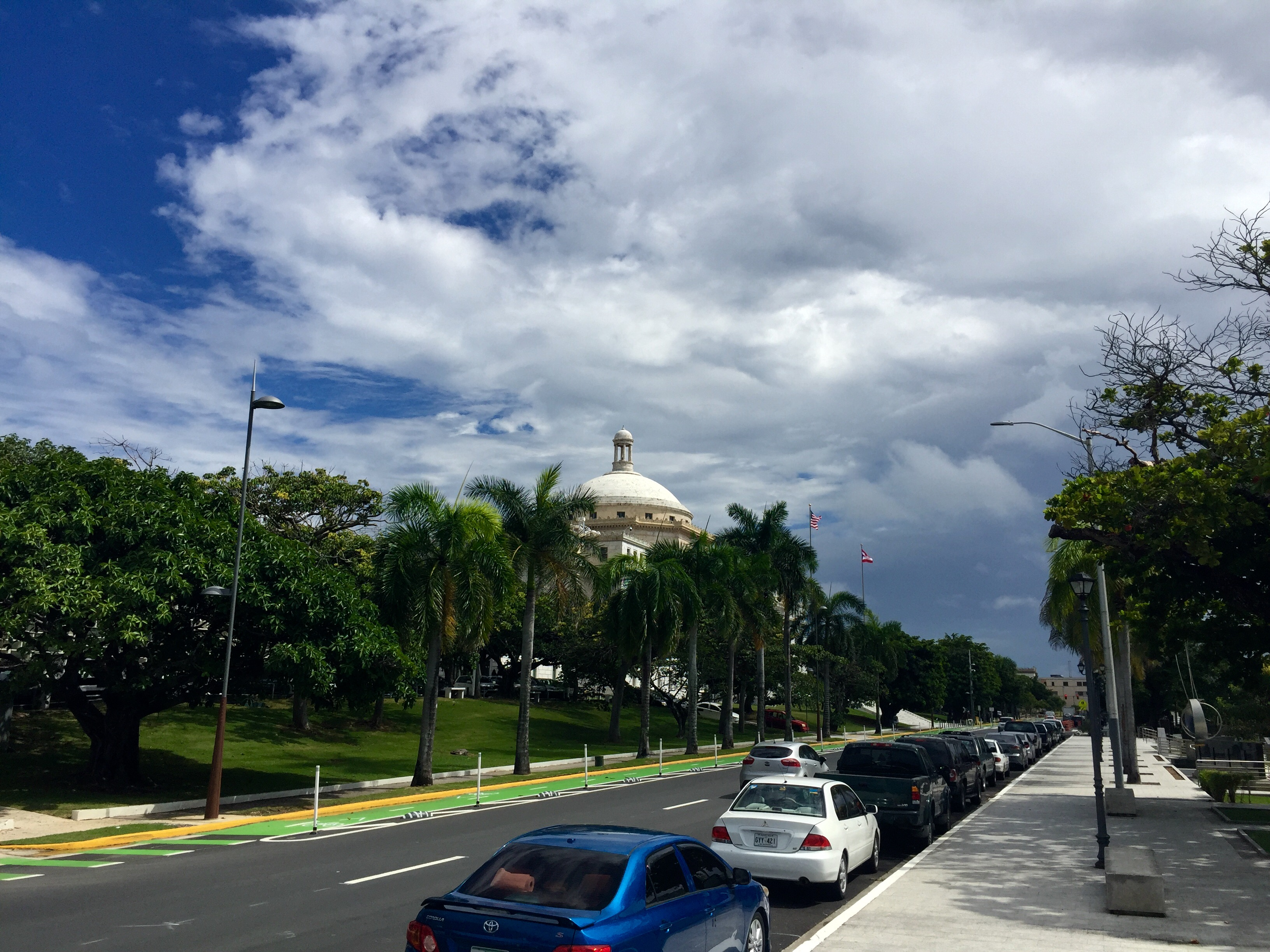
Rear (south façade) view of the Capitol from Juan Ponce de León Avenue, 2016

From east to west, the most prominent monuments are named as follows: Rafael Hernández Marín Monument, Santiago Iglesias Pantín Monument, Altar to the Nation, Carlos Luis Cáceres Collazo Monument, Walkway of the Presidents (who have visited Puerto Rico), Recipients of Medal of Honor Monument, World War I Monument, Memorial Monument, Holocaust Memorial, Teachers Monument, Lions' Plaza, Police Monument, Puerto Rican Woman Monument, and Ramón Mellado Parsons Monument.

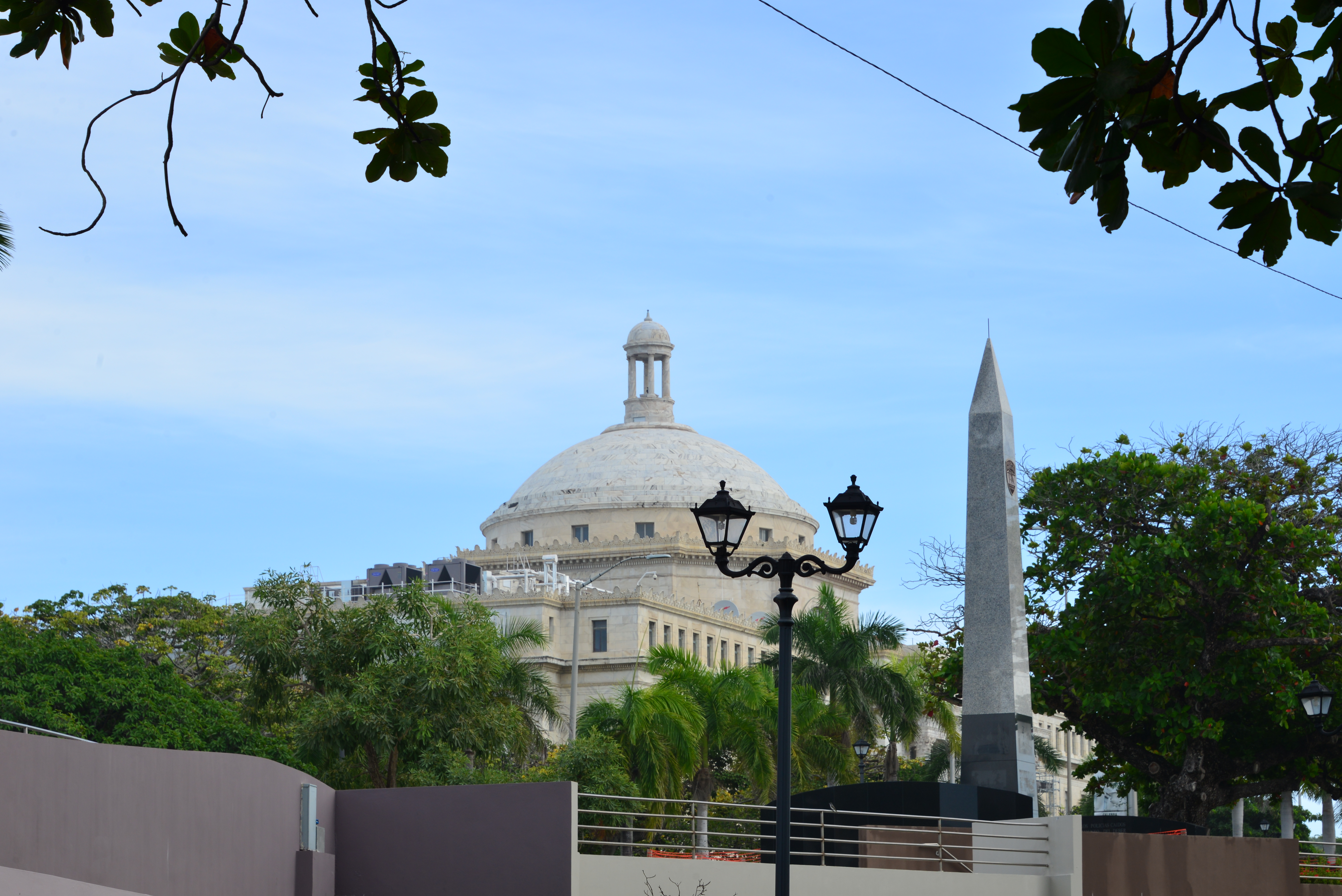
Rear (south façade) view of the Capitol from the obelisk monument honoring the Puerto Rico Police, 2015

The park is connected to the San Juan Cruise Port on San Juan Bay from the Memorial Monument through Calle Gral. Pershing (Gral. Pershing Road), which are directly situated south of the rear entrance to the Capitol. Containing a landscaped median strip with trees and benches dedicated to veterans as the Paseo de los Veteranos (Walk of the Veterans), Gral. Pershing Road functions as an extension of the park.

== Gallery ==
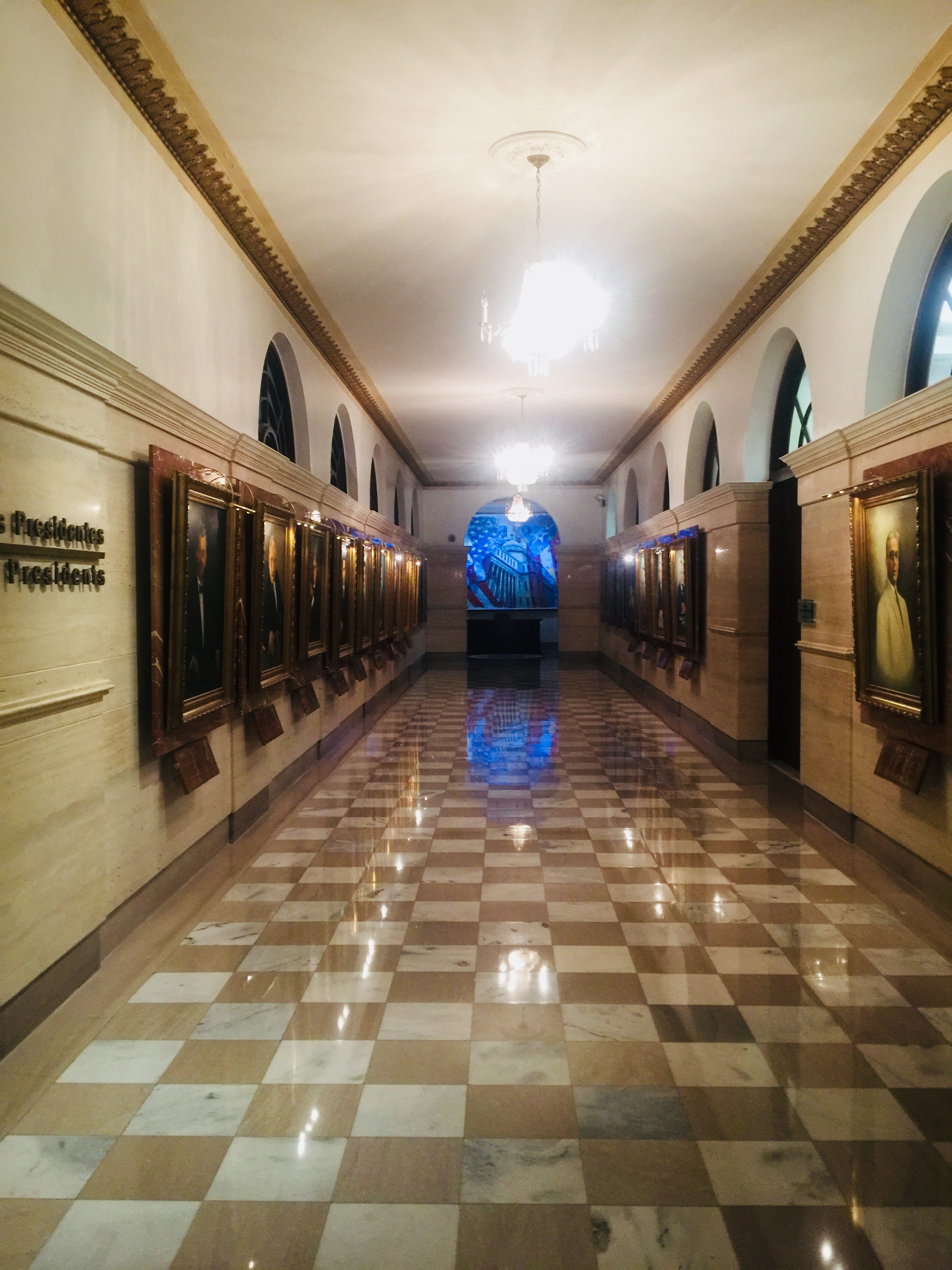
Gallery of the Capitol

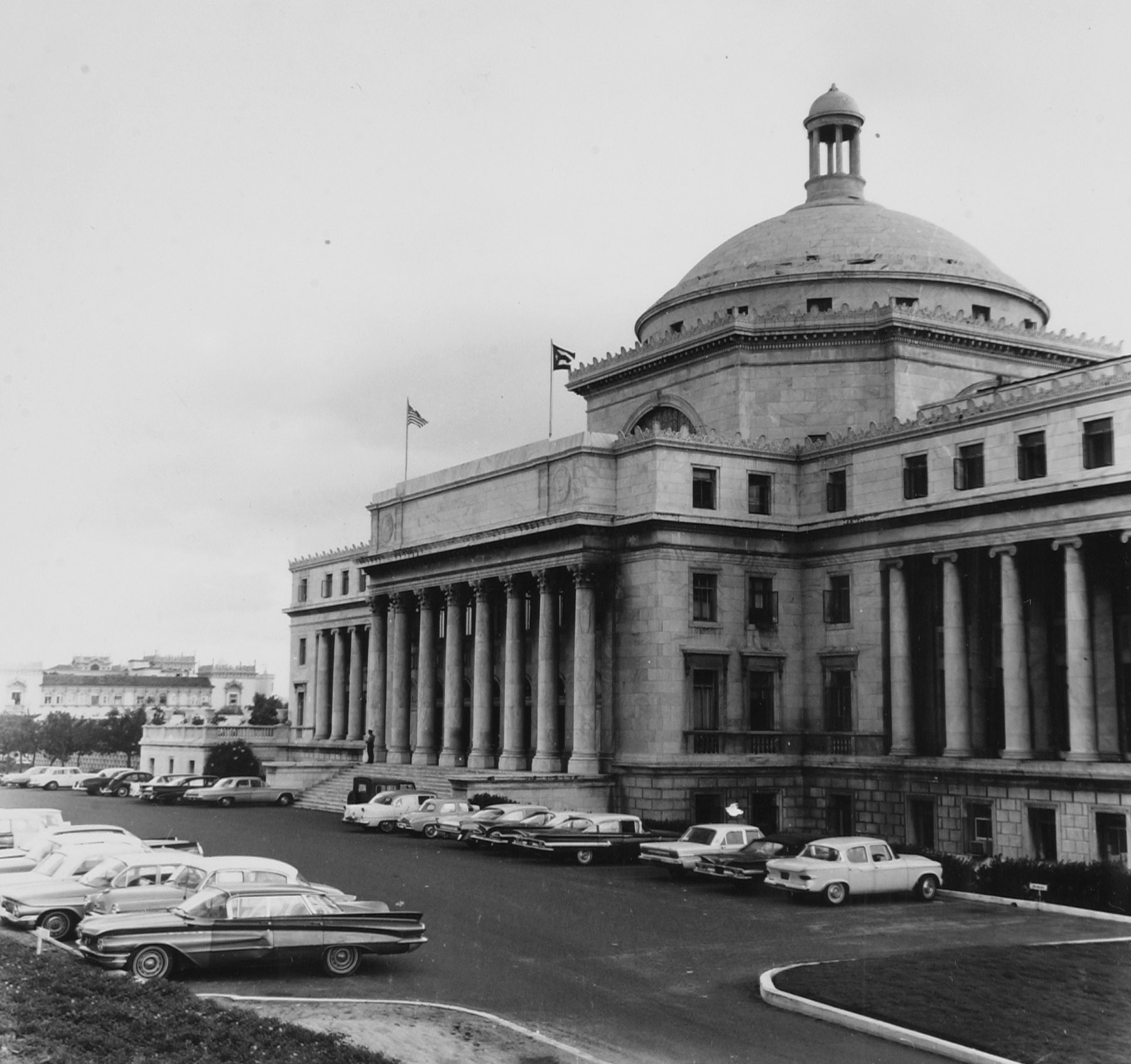
The Capitol in 1964

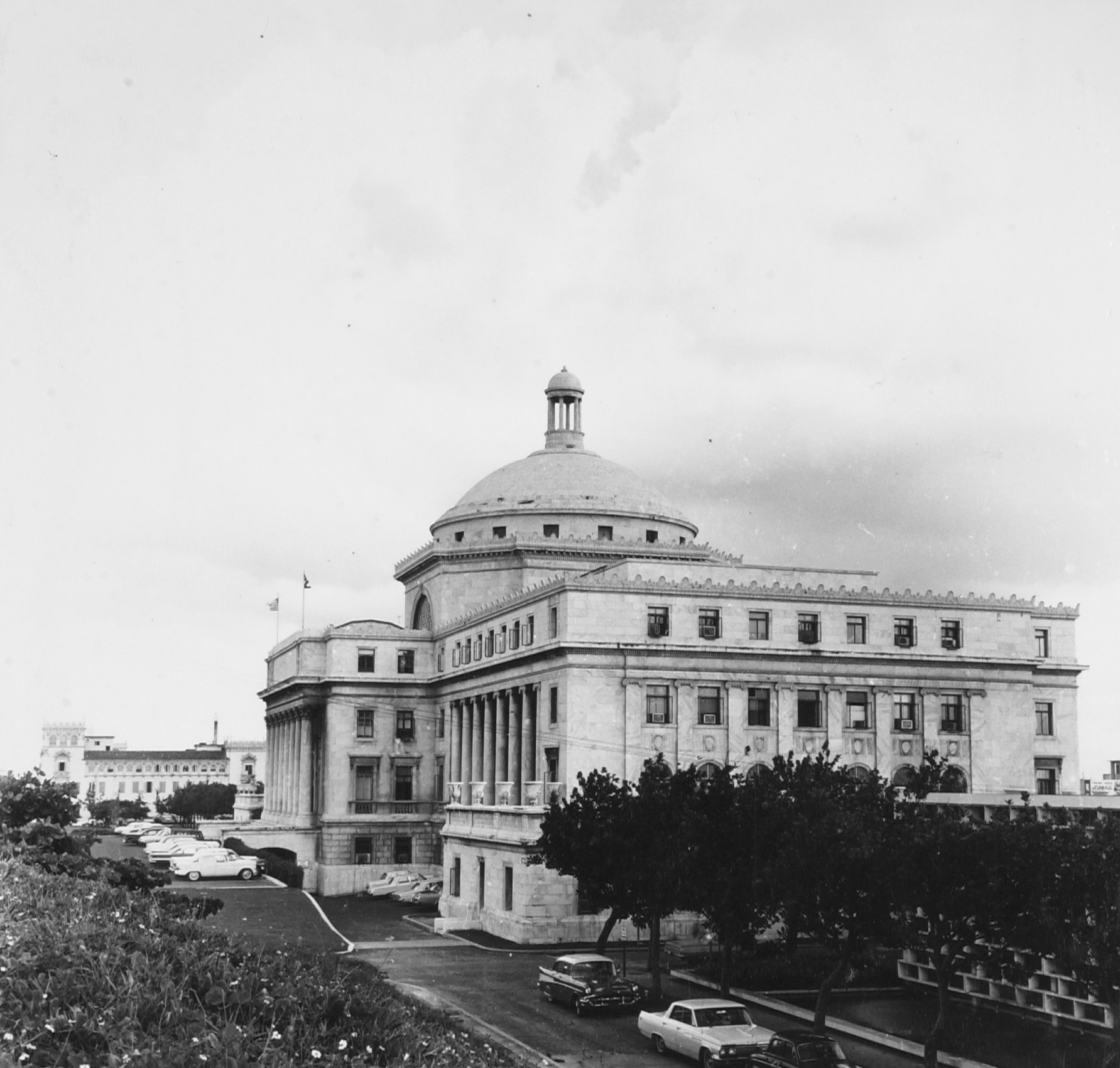
The Capitol in 1964

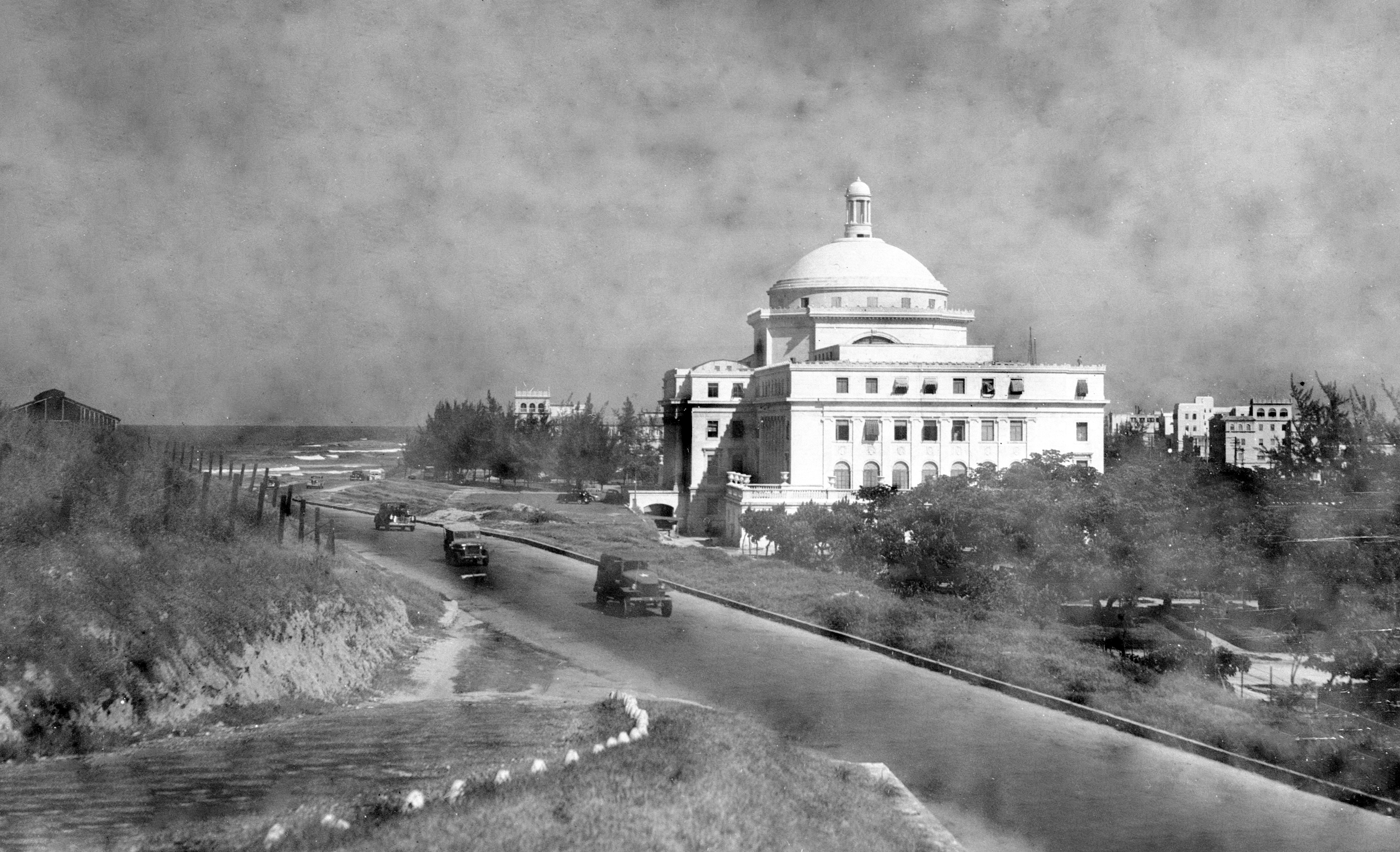
The Capitol in 1944

== See also ==
- List of Legislative Assemblies of Puerto Rico
- List of state and territorial capitols in the United States
