= President pro tempore of the Senate of Puerto Rico =

Vice President of the Senate of Puerto Rico

Vice President of the Senate of Puerto Rico
- Incumbent; Carmelo Ríos Santiago since January 11, 2021
- Style: The Honorable (diplomatic); Mr Vice President (when presiding over the Senate)
- Nominator: Nominated by the Senate
- Appointer: Elected by the Senate
- Term length: 4 years
- Inaugural holder: Eduardo Georgetti; August 13, 1917
- Formation: House Rule V January 12, 2009

The Vice President of the Senate of Puerto Rico (commonly known as the President pro tempore) is the second highest-ranking officer of the Senate of Puerto Rico and substitutes the President in his absence. The President pro tempore is counterparted in the House by the Speaker pro tempore of the House.

The current President pro tempore is Marially González Huertas (PPD).

== Presidents pro tempore ==
- 1917–1921: Eduardo Georgetti
- 1921–1924: Juan Hernández López
- 1926–1929: Luis Sánchez Morales
- 1929–1933: Celestino Iriarte Miró
- 1933–1940: Bolívar Pagán
- 1940–1941: Luis Padrón Rivera
- 1941–1944: Francisco M. Susoni Abreu
- 1945–1949: Samuel R. Quiñones
- 1949–1969: Luis Negrón López
- 1969–1973: Juan Cancel Ríos
- 1973–1977: Miguel Hernández Agosto
- 1977–1981: Manuel Ramos Barroso
- 1981–1988: Sergio Peña Clos
- 1989–1993: Miguel Deynes Soto
- 1993–1995: Nicolás Nogueras Cartagena
- 1995–1997: Luisa Lebrón de Rivera
- 1997–2000: Aníbal Marrero Pérez
- 2000–2001: Luz Arce Ferrer
- 2001–2005: Velda González de Modestti
- 2005–2009: Orlando Parga Figueroa
- 2009–2013: Margarita Nolasco Santiago
- 2013–2017: José Luis Dalmau
- 2017–2020: Larry Seilhamer
- 2020–2021: Henry Neumann
- 2021–2024: Marially González Huertas
- 2025–present: Carmelo Ríos Santiago
