= President of the Senate of Puerto Rico =

Highest-ranking officer and the presiding officer of the Senate of Puerto Rico

President of the Senate of Puerto Rico

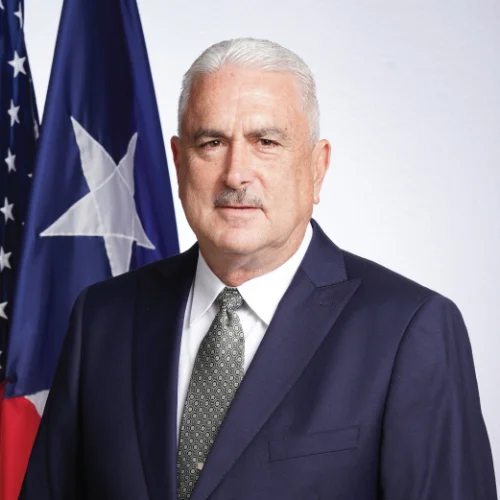
- Incumbent; Thomas Rivera Schatz (NPP) since January 13, 2025
- Style: The Honorable diplomatic Mister President when presiding over the Senate
- Nominator: nominated internally by the Senate
- Appointer: elected internally by the Senate
- Term length: 4 years
- Inaugural holder: Antonio R. Barceló; August 13, 1917
- Formation: March 2, 1917; Jones–Shafroth Act; Article III of the Constitution of Puerto Rico
- Deputy: President pro tempore

The president of the Senate of Puerto Rico (Spanish: Presidente del Senado) is the highest-ranking officer and the presiding officer of the Senate of Puerto Rico. The president has voting powers as it is elected amongst the own members of the Senate as established by Article III of the Constitution of Puerto Rico. The Constitution, however, does not establish its functions and since the Senate is the only body authorized by the Constitution to regulate its own internal affairs, the functions of the president vary from session to session—save being called "President" as the Constitution establishes. The president is typically elected during the Senate's inaugural session.

When absent, the president is substituted by the president pro tempore. Its counterpart in the House is the speaker.

The current president is Thomas Rivera Schatz, senator at-large from the New Progressive Party

== Background ==
The president traces its history back to more than 109 years ago when the Jones–Shafroth Act formally established the post on March 2, 1917. Said act was eventually superseded by another law, and the post was eventually established by the Constitution of Puerto Rico, specifically Article III, which establishes that, "The Senate shall elect a President [...] from among [its] members." The Constitution, however, does not establish what a "president" is nor what its function should be. Internal rules adopted by the Senate through a simple resolution establish its definition, functions, responsibilities, and legal scope.

== Functions ==
Typically the president is responsible for the observance and compliance of the Senate's internal rules. He also typically:

- presides all Senate meetings
- resolves and decides all parliamentary situations and rules of order brought in sessions,
- names all permanent and special commissions of the Senate,
- signs all bills, joint resolutions, concurrent resolutions, reorganization plans, and simple resolutions approved by the Senate and the Legislative Assembly,
- convenes special sessions of the Senate,
- maintains order and decorum in the Senate, a responsibility typically delegated to the Sergeant-at-Arms of the Senate,
- must vote in all matters presented in the Senate (can not abstain),
- represents the Senate in all forums,
- is responsible for all administrative matters of the Senate, a responsibility typically delegated to the Secretary of the Senate,
- appoints an internal auditor for the Senate,
- prepares a registry of all lobbyists that must be freely available to the public,
- is responsible of providing free access to the public to all works generated by the Senate, and
- offers training and continuing education opportunities to Senate members, advisors, and employees.

== Presidents ==
Union Party Republican Party New Progressive Party Popular Democratic Party
#	Portrait	President	Date it took office	Date it left office	Political party	President pro-tempore
1		Antonio R. Barceló (1868–1938)	1917	1929	Union	Eduardo Georgetti; 1917–1921 Juan Hernández López; 1921–1924 Luis Sánchez Morales; 1926–1929
2		Luis Sánchez Morales (1867–1934)	1929	1933	Republican	Celestino Iriarte Miró
3		Rafael Martínez Nadal (1877–1941)	1933	1941	Republican	Bolívar Pagán; 1933–1940 Luis Padrón Rivera; 1940–1941
4		Luis Muñoz Marín (1898–1980)	1941	1949	PPD	Francisco M. Susoni Abreu; 1941–1944 Samuel R. Quiñones; 1945–1949
5		Samuel R. Quiñones (1904–1976)	1949	1969	PPD	Luis Negrón López
6		Rafael Hernández Colón (1936–2019)	1969	1973	PPD	Juan J. Cancel Ríos
7		Juan J. Cancel Ríos (1925–1992)	1973	1977	PPD	Miguel Hernández Agosto
8		Luis A. Ferré Aguayo (1904–2003)	1977	1981	PNP	Manuel Ramos Barroso
9		Miguel Hernández Agosto (1927–2016)	1981	1993	PPD	Sergio Peña Clos; 1981–1988 Miguel Deynes Soto; 1989–1993
10		Roberto Rexach Benítez (1929–2012)	1993	1997	PNP	Nicolás Nogueras Cartagena; 1993–1995 Luisa Lebrón de Rivera; 1995–1997
11		Charles A. Rodríguez Colón (b. 1954)	1997	2001	PNP	Aníbal Marrero Pérez; 1997–2000 Luz Z. Arce Ferrer; 2000–2001
12		Antonio Fas Alzamora (b. 1948)	2001	2005	PPD	Velda González de Modestti
13		Kenneth D. McClintock Hernández (b. 1957)	2005	2009	PNP	Orlando Parga Figueroa
14		Thomas Rivera Schatz (b. 1966)	2009	2013	PNP	Margarita Nolasco Santiago
15		Eduardo Bhatia (b. 1964)	2013	2017	PPD	José Luis Dalmau
16		Thomas Rivera Schatz (b. 1966)	2017	2021	PNP	Larry Seilhamer Rodríguez
17		José Luis Dalmau (b. 1966)	2021	2025	PPD	Marially González Huertas
18		Thomas Rivera Schatz (b. 1966)	2025	Present	PNP	Carmelo Ríos Santiago Marissa Jimenez Santoni

== See also ==
- List of Legislative Assemblies of Puerto Rico
