= 1932 Puerto Rican general election =

1932 Puerto Rico elections
- November 8, 1932

General elections were held in Puerto Rico on 8 November 1932. Santiago Iglesias was elected Resident Commissioner.

== Results ==
=== Resident Commissioner ===
Candidate	Party or alliance		Votes	%
Santiago Iglesias	Coalition	Republican Union	110,794	28.87
Santiago Iglesias	Coalition	Socialist Party	97,438	25.39
Santiago Iglesias	Coalition	Total	208,232	54.27
Benigno Fernández García	Liberal Party		170,168	44.35
Julio Medina González	Nationalist Party		5,257	1.37
Other candidates			65	0.02
Total			383,722	100.00
Source: Puerto Rican Election Archive

=== Senate ===
==== At-large members ====
Candidate	Party	Votes	%	Notes
Bolívar Pagán	Socialist Party	88,503	24.74	Elected
Luis Muñoz Marín	Liberal Party	55,446	15.50	Elected
Antonio Rafael Barceló	Liberal Party	51,837	14.49	Elected
Mario Mercado, Jr.	Liberal Party	46,380	12.96	Elected
Rafael Martínez Nadal	Republican Union	42,699	11.94	Elected
Luis Sánchez Morales	Republican Union	33,027	9.23	
Francisco M. Zeno	Republican Union	27,953	7.81	
Pedro Albizu Campos	Nationalist Party	11,882	3.32	
Other candidates		9	0.00	
Total		357,736	100.00	
Source: Nolla

==== District members ====
Party	Class 1			Class 2			Total seats
Party	Votes	%	Seats	Votes	%	Seats	Total seats
Coalition	208,625	54.58	6	208,341	54.54	6	12
Liberal Party	169,563	44.36	1	169,583	44.40	1	2
Nationalist Party	4,055	1.06	0	4,039	1.06	0	0
Total	382,243	100.00	7	381,963	100.00	7	14
Source: Nolla

=== House of Representatives ===
==== At-large members ====
Candidate	Party	Votes	%	Notes
Rafael Alonso Torres	Socialist Party	89,783	25.09	Elected
Manuel A. Martínez Dávila	Liberal Party	77,299	21.60	Elected
Ernesto Ramos Antonini	Liberal Party	76,985	21.51	Elected
Etienne Totti	Republican Union	55,522	15.51	Elected
Rafael Cuevas Zequeira	Republican Union	49,357	13.79	
Francisco Vincenty	Nationalist Party	8,935	2.50	
Other candidates		11	0.00	
Total		357,892	100.00	
Source: Nolla

==== District members ====
Party	Votes	%	Seats
Coalition	208,469	54.41	28
Liberal Party	169,780	44.31	7
Nationalist Party	4,802	1.25	0
Other parties	114	0.03	0
Independents	8	0.00	0
Total	383,173	100.00	35
Source: Nolla
