= Senator Barceló =

Senator Barceló may refer to:

- Antonio Rafael Barceló (1868–1938), Senate of Puerto Rico
- Carlos Romero Barceló (1932–2021), Senate of Puerto Rico
