= Senator Rios =

Senator Rios may refer to:

- Pete Rios (1980s–2000s), Arizona State Senate
- Rebecca Rios (born 1967), Arizona State Senate
- Juan Cancel Ríos (1925–1992), Senate of Puerto Rico
