= Rafael Martínez Nadal =

Puerto Rican politician (1877–1941)

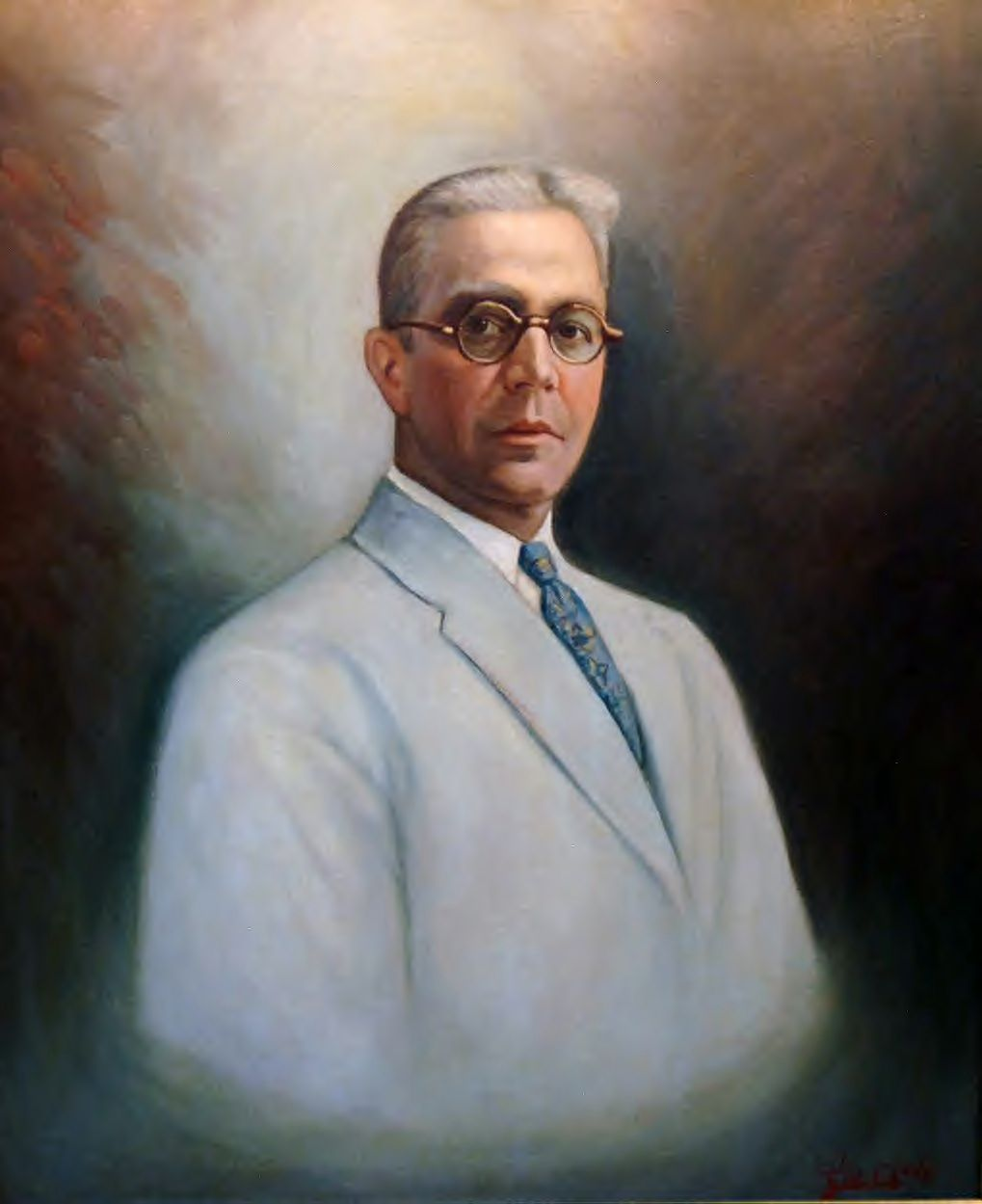

3rd President of the Senate of Puerto Rico
- In office 1933–1941
- Preceded by: Luis Sánchez Morales
- Succeeded by: Luis Muñoz Marín

Member of the Senate of Puerto Rico from the at-large district
- In office 1921 – July 6, 1941

Personal details
- Born: Rafael Martínez Nadal; April 22, 1877 Mayagüez, Puerto Rico
- Died: July 6, 1941 (aged 64) Guaynabo, Puerto Rico
- Party: Republican Party of Puerto Rico; Republican Union

Rafael Martínez Nadal (Note: In this name that follows Hispanic American naming customs, the first or paternal surname is Martínez and the second or maternal family name is Nadal.) (April 22, 1877 – July 6, 1941) was a Puerto Rican politician, journalist, and businessman. He was the third president of the Senate of Puerto Rico, serving from 1933 to 1941.

== Early years ==
Rafael Martínez Nadal was born on April 22, 1877, in Mayagüez, Puerto Rico. He was an orphan from an early age, since his mother, Estebanía Nadal Freyre, died hours after his birth, and his father, Rafael Martínez Santana, when he was only five years old. After that, he was raised in Maricao, Puerto Rico, by his paternal aunts. He then studied in San Juan, Puerto Rico.

== Professional life ==
At the age of sixteen, his tutor sent him to Barcelona, Spain, to study law. However, he interrupted his studies and went to live in Paris. He spent the next years between Paris, Madrid and Barcelona, where he was a businessman in fields as varied as bullfighting, meat distribution, theater production and coffee importation.

On August 13, 1904, Martínez Nadal returned to Mayagüez, where he dedicated himself to the coffee business. He also became a journalist and joined the Puerto Rico Republican Party founded several years earlier by Dr. José Celso Barbosa. In 1908 he founded the newspaper El Combate. In 1912, he moved to Ponce and began studying again, receiving his law degree. His practice became so prominent that, even decades later, many court observers quipped a popular rhyme in Spanish, Temblaba la corte, temblaba el fiscal, temblaban los jueces, cuando llegaba Martínez Nadal ("the court feared, the DA feared, the judges feared, when Martínez Nadal appeared").

== Political career ==
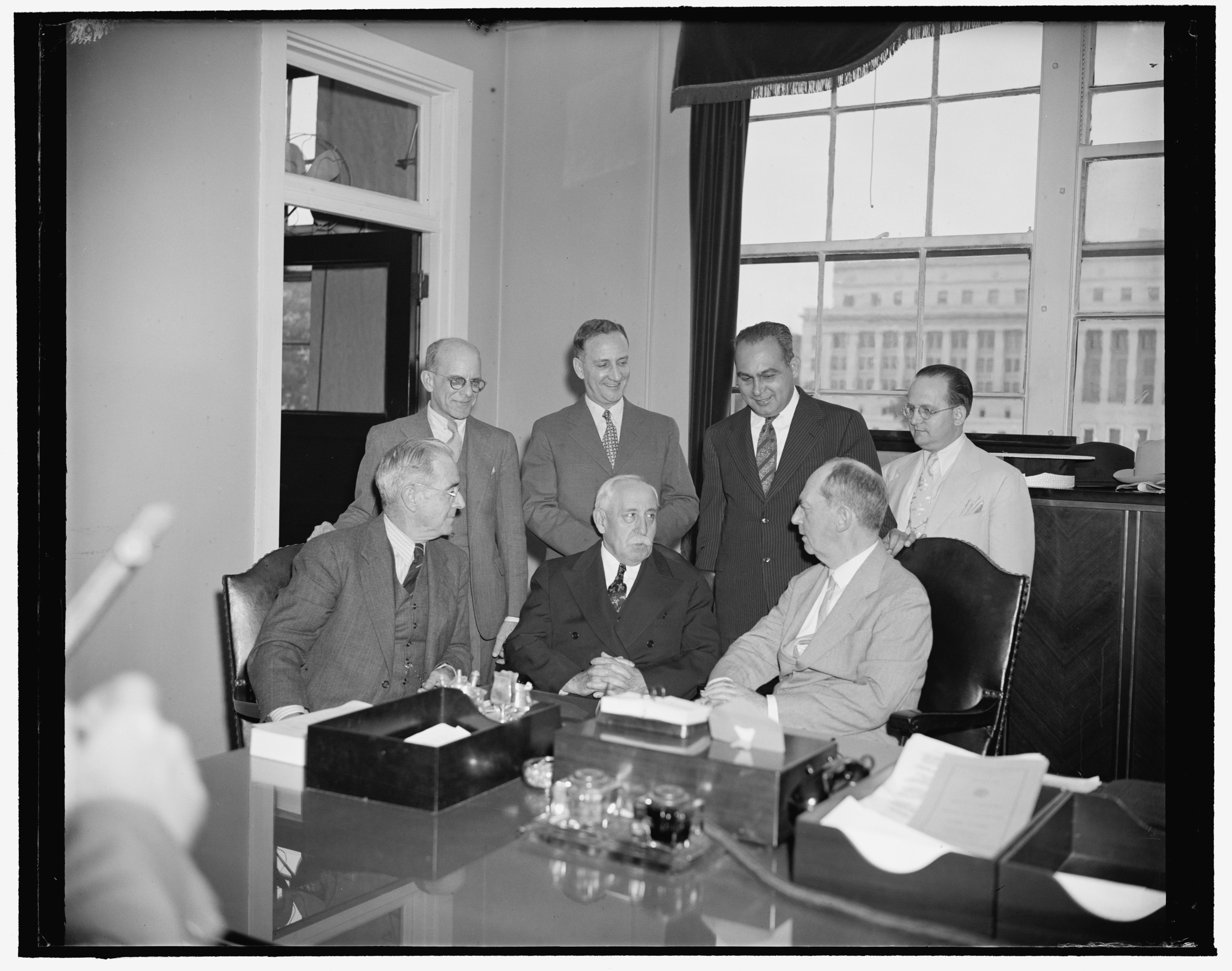
Rafael Martinez Nadal (left, seated) in conference with the recently appointed Puerto Rico governor William D. Leahy (right, seated).

Martínez Nadal was elected in 1914 as a member of the Puerto Rico House of Delegates, the precursor of the Puerto Rico House of Representatives, representing Ponce. As a member of the Republican Party of Puerto Rico, he was elected to the Senate of Puerto Rico in 1920.

When the Union Party joined the Republican Party in 1924 forming Alianza Puertorriqueña, Martínez Nadal left his party in disagreement. He then formed a party called the Partido Constitucional Histórico, aligning with the Socialist Party of Santiago Iglesias Pantín. He was then reelected in 1924 and 1928.

After the Alianza disbanded, Martínez Nadal formed another party called the Republican Union, under his presidency. He was reelected in 1932 and was elected President of the Senate of Puerto Rico. He served in that position until his death from cancer on July 6, 1941, in Guaynabo, Puerto Rico. He was buried at Santa María Magdalena de Pazzis Cemetery in San Juan, Puerto Rico.

== Legacy ==
Puerto Rico Highway 20 in Guaynabo is named after Martínez Nadal.

== Notes ==
Senate of Puerto Rico
Preceded by Luis Sánchez Morales	President of the Senate of Puerto Rico; 1933–1941	Succeeded by Luis Muñoz Marín
Party political offices
Preceded by José Tous Soto	Chairman of the Puerto Rico Republican Party; 1932–1940	Succeeded by Celestino Iriarte Miró
