= Henry Neumann =

Puerto Rican politician (born 1950)

Member of the Puerto Rico Senate from the San Juan district
- In office January 15, 2017 – June 30, 2022

President pro tempore of the Puerto Rico Senate
- In office January 15, 2020 – January 2, 2021
- Preceded by: Larry Seilhamer
- Succeeded by: Marially González Huertas

Puerto Rico Secretary of Sports and Recreation
- In office January 2, 2009 – January 2, 2012
- Governor: Luis Fortuño
- Preceded by: Lucy Molinary
- Succeeded by: Ramón Orta

Personal details
- Born: December 12, 1950 (age 75) Cuba
- Party: New Progressive
- Education: Georgetown University (BBA); University of Puerto Rico School of Law (JD)

Henry Neumann Zayas (born December 12, 1950) is an attorney, and a former state senator for the San Juan district in Puerto Rico (PNP-R).

A former president of Puerto Rico's National Superior Basketball league, he was also a Secretary of Sports and Recreation of Puerto Rico. In 2015, Neumann announced his Senate candidacy on behalf of the New Progressive Party of Puerto Rico, becoming a representative of the district of San Juan. He retired from public service in 2022.

== Early life and education ==
After finishing high school he entered Georgetown University in Washington, D.C., where he earned a Bachelor in business administration with honors in 1972. Once he completed university, he served in the United States Army. He returned to the island to study at the University of Puerto Rico School of Law, where he obtained the degree of Juris Doctor in 1975.

== Career ==
A former basketball player, he served for many years as president of Puerto Rico's National Superior Basketball league, taking over from Hector "Hetin" Reyes in 2000, and retaining the role as of 2002.

In March 2008, he aspired to become one of the New Progressive Party of Puerto Rico's six at-large Senate candidates at the PNP primaries, but ended up in seventh place.

=== Sports Secretary ===
As of April 2009, he was secretary of the Puerto Rico Department of Sports and Recreation.

In June 2008, he was selected as a member of the 2010 Central and Caribbean Games Organizing Committee. The Games were held in Mayagüez during the summer of 2010. To facilitate the government's collaboration with the Games, Governor Luis Fortuño appointed him to chair a 25-member coordinating committee, composed of Puerto Rico government agency heads.

In March 2012, while sports department Secretary, Neumann joined Rick Santorum during the Republican politician's two day visit to Puerto Rico, in what was Santorum's first campaign stop since several primary wins to run for US president. Neumann, who has supported US statehood for Puerto Rico, was described in the press as a backer of Santorum. During the visit, Santorum caused controversy when in interviews, he supported statehood but gave inconsistent answers about whether he saw having English as Puerto Rico's official language as a prerequisite. Neumann, as co-chairman of Santorum's Puerto Rico campaign, stated afterwards that Santorum only meant young people learning English was important.

=== Senator for San Juan (2015-2022) ===
On October 26, 2015, Neumann announced his Senate candidacy on behalf of the New Progressive Party of Puerto Rico. He became a representative of the district of San Juan. As a legislator, he is known for a pro-statehood stance. As of late 2018, he was President of the Senate's Public Safety Commission.

In 2019, as a member of the Puerto Rico Senate, he backed a law to keep the cockfighting industry of Puerto Rico legal. A response to the 2018 Farm Bill which made cockfighting illegal in all US territories by December 2019, the bill was signed by Puerto Rico Governor Wanda Vázquez on December 18, 2019. Neumann describing the signing as "a first step we’re taking to try to correct one of the biggest and most crass injustices that Washington has taken against this colony, Puerto Rico."

As a senator with the New Progressive Party, he voted in favor of Bill 693, which would have banned all abortions in Puerto Rico after the 22nd week of pregnancy. After passing in the senate, it was stopped in the House in June 2022. In June 2022, he co-authored an approved bill to raise pay for firefighters.

On June 21, 2022, Neumann announced his resignation to the Senate of Puerto Rico, effective June 30, 2022, stating he wished to spend more time with family.

Senate of Puerto Rico
Preceded by Larry Seilhamer	President pro tempore of the Puerto Rico Senate; 2020–2021	Succeeded by Marially González Huertas
