= Senate of Puerto Rico =

Upper house of the Legislative Assembly of Puerto Rico

Coordinates: 18°28′8″N 66°6′22″W

Senate of Puerto Rico Senado de Puerto Rico
- 28th Senate of Puerto Rico

Type
- Type: Upper house of the Legislative Assembly of Puerto Rico

History
- Founded: August 13, 1917
- Preceded by: Executive Council (1900–1917)

Leadership
- President: Thomas Rivera Schatz (PNP)
- First Vice President: Carmelo Ríos Santiago (PNP)
- Second Vice President: Marissa Jiménez Santoni (PNP)
- Majority Leader: Gregorio Matías Rosario (PNP)
- Majority Whip: Juan Oscar Morales Rodríguez (PNP)
- Minority Leaders: Luis Javier Hernández Ortiz (PPD); María de Lourdes Santiago Negrón (PIP)
- Minority Whips: Marially González Huertas (PPD); Adrián González Costa (PIP)

Structure
- Seats: 28
- Political groups: Majority (19); PNP (19); Minority (9); PPD (5); PIP (2); Independent (2)

Elections
- Voting system: Plurality-at-large for 16 electoral districts seats and single non-transferable vote for 11 at-large seats (Note: The Senate can increase its number of senators when in a general election more than two-thirds of the members of the Senate are elected from one political party or from a single ticket.)
- Last election: November 5, 2024
- Next election: November 7, 2028

Meeting place
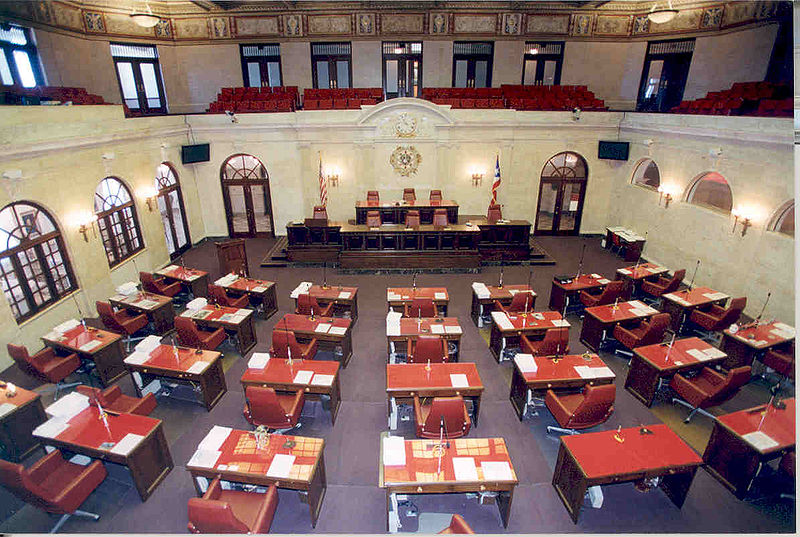
- Capitol of Puerto Rico, San Juan, Puerto Rico

Website
- senado.pr.gov

The Senate of Puerto Rico (Spanish: Senado de Puerto Rico) is the upper house of the Legislative Assembly of Puerto Rico, the territorial legislature of Puerto Rico. The Senate, together with the House of Representatives of Puerto Rico, control the legislative branch of the government of Puerto Rico.

The structure and responsibilities of the Senate are defined in Article III of the Constitution of Puerto Rico which vests all legislative power in the Legislative Assembly. Every bill must be passed by both the Senate and the House and then signed by the Governor of Puerto Rico in order to become law.

The Senate has exclusive power to try and to decide impeachments. The constitution also establishes that all secretaries appointed by the governor to the different executive departments, as well as all judges and the Comptroller, require the advice and consent of the Senate. Justices of the Supreme Court can not assume office until after confirmation by the Senate.

The Senate normally has 27 members. Sixteen are elected from senatorial districts, with two senators per district, while an additional 11 are elected at-large.

The Senate has been meeting since 1917, after the enactment of the Jones–Shafroth Act established the body formally. The current session is the 28th Senate of Puerto Rico, which has a majority from the Popular Democratic Party, giving the party control over the Senate without political opposition including constitutional amendments. (Note: The party has absolute control over constitutional amendments as these are proposed through concurrent resolutions that must be approved by not less than two thirds of both the Senate and the House. Currently the party has control over two thirds of both the Senate and the House and can, therefore, propose constitutional amendments without opposition.)

The Senate, along with its members and staff, are housed in the eastern half of the Capitol of Puerto Rico. These buildings are usually the Rafael Martínez Nadal Senate Annex Building, the Luis Muñoz Marín Office Building, the Antonio R. Barceló Building, the Luis A. Ferré Building, the Ramón Mellado Parsons Office Building and the Baltasar Corrada del Rio Office Building.

== History ==
The Senate of Puerto Rico was established by the Jones–Shafroth Act of 1917. Signed on March 2, 1917, the act granted U.S. citizenship to Puerto Ricans and empowered them to have a popularly elected Senate. This amended and expanded the Foraker Act, signed in 1900, which established a civilian government in Puerto Rico while granting only limited self-governance.

From 1900 to 1917, Puerto Ricans made several attempts to convince the United States to amend the Foraker Act, so they could elect their own Senate. In February 1914, Resident Commissioner of Puerto Rico, Luis Muñoz Rivera, presented legislation in Congress insisting on the creation of a Puerto Rican Senate with more powers. Finally, in January 1916, Representative William Jones presented the Jones Act for Puerto Rico and other territories. It was signed by Woodrow Wilson on March 2, 1917.

On August 13, 1917, the first Senate of Puerto Rico was sworn in. Antonio R. Barceló was chosen as its first President, with Eduardo Georgetti as his Pro tempore. Also, José Muñoz Rivera and Manuel Palacios Salazar were selected as Secretary and Sergeant at Arms respectively. In this first instance, the Senate was composed of 19 members, 14 of which were chosen from each of the seven senatorial districts, and five elected at-large.

== Functions ==
The Senate, along with the House of Representatives, are in charge of the legislative power of the Government of Puerto Rico.

The Senate has exclusive power to try and to decide impeachment cases, and in meeting for such purposes, the Senators act in the name of the people of Puerto Rico. The Constitution also establishes that all Secretaries appointed by the Governor to the different executive departments, as well as all judges, require the advice and consent of the Senate. Justices of the Supreme Court can not assume office until after confirmation by the Senate.

== Membership ==
=== Qualifications ===
Article III of the Constitution of Puerto Rico states that no person can be a member of the Senate unless the candidate:

- is capable of reading and writing in either Spanish or English;
- is a citizen of the United States and Puerto Rico;
- has resided in Puerto Rico for at least two years immediately prior to the date of his election or appointment;
- is over thirty years of age.

=== Elections ===
Structure of the Senate of Puerto Rico for the purpose of elections. Puerto Rico is divided into eight districts with two senators per districts. An additional eleven senators are elected at-large. Both groups serve alongside each other with the same powers and rights.

Elections to the Senate are held every four years on the Tuesday after the first Monday of November, along with the elections for governor, resident commissioner, the House, the mayors, and the municipal assemblies. The last election was held on November 8, 2016, where the members of the 26th Senate of Puerto Rico were elected. The next election is scheduled for November 3, 2020 where the members of the 27th Senate of Puerto Rico will be elected. Members of the Senate are elected for a four-year term. Tony Fas Alzamora is the most senior and longest-serving senator, having served for nine consecutive terms since 1981 for a total of 45 years.

Only American citizens (including Puerto Ricans) that meet all the following requirements may vote for senators:

- must legally reside in Puerto Rico,
- must be at least 18 years old by the date of the election,
- must have been qualified by the Puerto Rico State Commission on Elections before the election or on the very same day of the election after he presents himself to his nearest place of voting and shows proper documentation, and
- must have not been declared mentally incapacitated by court.

Citizens cast their votes in colleges (Spanish: colegios) which are simply usually the nearest public school to where the voter declared as residence. Votes are required by law to be cast in secret, unless the citizen has a physical impairment that does not allow him to. Those citizens unable to travel to colleges due to medical impairments may vote at their place of residence (homes, elder homes, etc.) or wherever they are convalescing (hospitals, clinics, etc.). In both of these extraordinary cases, officials from the Puerto Rico State Commission on Elections will provide aid so that the citizens can cast their vote—either by using verbal or non-verbal communication—with members from the different political parties required to observe the process in order to ensure accuracy, fairness, transparency, order, and legitimacy.

Ballots are redacted in both Spanish and English, regardless of whether English is an official language or not. (Note: English has been removed as an official language several times throughout Puerto Rico's modern history, but ballots must be redacted in English too regardless.)

To elect the members of the Senate, Puerto Rico is divided into eight senatorial districts, each based on a similar number of inhabitants:

- Puerto Rico Senatorial district I—San Juan
- Puerto Rico Senatorial district II—Bayamón
- Puerto Rico Senatorial district III—Arecibo
- Puerto Rico Senatorial district IV—Mayagüez–Aguadilla
- Puerto Rico Senatorial district V—Ponce
- Puerto Rico Senatorial district VI—Guayama
- Puerto Rico Senatorial district VII—Humacao
- Puerto Rico Senatorial district VIII—Carolina

These districts are in turn divided into one or more precincts: electoral divisions which are in turn divided into the aforementioned colleges. For each district, citizens may vote only for the district in which they have declared their residence, and only for two candidates per district by plurality-at-large. The two candidates with the highest votes in the respective district serve as senators for that specific district. District senators are expected to give priority to matters related to the district they represent but are not required to do so by law.

In addition, citizens are allowed to vote for one candidate at-large of their preference by single non-transferable vote. The eleven at-large candidates with the most votes serve as senators at-large alongside the district senators with the same powers and rights. Senators at-large are expected to serve any individual or group but are not required to do so by law; they also serve as a mechanism for citizens who do not wish to channel their affairs through their district senator for whatever reason.

=== Term ===
Senators serve terms of four years each. A member who has been elected, but not yet seated, is called a "senator-elect"; a member who has been appointed to a seat, but not yet seated, is called a "senator-designate". The Puerto Rico Constitution does not provide for term limits and, in fact, one current senator is completing his ninth four-year term as a senator and his tenth as a legislator.

=== Salary and benefits ===
The annual salary for full-time work of each senator is US$73,775 annually, except for the President of the Senate which receives $110,663, and the President pro tempore, the Majority and Minority Leaders, the Majority and Minority Whips, and the presidents of the Commission on Government and the Commission on Treasury which receive $84,841 each.

Senators are allowed to generate additional income from outside their legislative employment subject to restrictions, and only the senators which do not receive an annual salary are entitled to additional benefits such as per diem or car allowance. Costs associated to traveling outside of Puerto Rico is reimbursed. Cost-of-living adjustments have been frozen since 2005. All senators qualify for the same retirement and health benefits as of all other employees of the government of Puerto Rico.

In addition, all senators are provided with office space, secretarial services, advisors, support personnel, office supplies, and stationery. Hiring of personnel working directly for each senator is at the discretion of each senator. Rather than providing these resources and services directly, senators are instead assigned a budget from which they retrieve funds to pay for these. Senators that preside commissions are assigned larger budgets than those who don't; creating a difference between the budgets assigned to senators from the party holding a majority in the Senate versus the ones in minority as majority senators tend to be the ones that preside commissions.

== Majority and minority parties ==
The "Majority party" is the political party that has a majority of seats. The next-largest party is known as the minority party. The president pro tempore, committee chairs, and some other officials are generally from the majority party.

Whenever the elected members of the minority constitute less than nine members, the Constitution provides for the certification of additional "add-on" minority Senators, who will serve in an at-large capacity. Such was the case after the 2004 elections, when four defeated Popular Democratic Party (PPD) Senate candidates, one at-large, and three district candidates, were added on as at-large Senators, joining the five PPD Senators who had achieved election in their own right. This constitutional guarantee of a minimum legislative minority representation is unique to Puerto Rico among all legislatures under the American flag, incorporating an element of proportionality usually found only in proportional representation bodies.

== Officers ==
The Senate is served by several officers with and without voting powers, which are elected from within and outside its ranks. Of these, only the president was established by the Constitution; all other officers were established by internal rules adopted by the Senate. Only the president and president pro tempore have voting powers as all are elected from within. Non-voting officers are elected from outside Senate ranks and simply assist in internal procedures and clerical tasks, and in the observance of internal rules, laws, and the Constitution. Typical non-voting officers include the secretary, the sergeant-at-arms, and other officers appointed by the different commissions as part of their own internal affairs.

=== President of the Senate ===
The president is the highest-ranking officer and the presiding officer of the Senate. The post was created by Article III of the Constitution of Puerto Rico which establishes that, "The Senate shall elect a President [...] from among [its] members." The president is substituted by the president pro tempore in his absence. Its counterpart in the House is the speaker.

The current president is Thomas Rivera Schatz, senator at-large from the New Progressive Party of Puerto Rico.

- 1917–1929: Antonio R. Barceló
- 1929–1933: Luis Sánchez Morales
- 1933–1941: Rafael Martínez Nadal
- 1941–1949: Luis Muñoz Marín
- 1949–1969: Samuel R. Quiñones
- 1969–1973: Rafael Hernández Colón
- 1973–1977: Juan J. Cancel Ríos
- 1977–1981: Luis A. Ferré
- 1981–1993: Miguel Hernández Agosto
- 1993–1997: Roberto Rexach Benítez
- 1997–2001: Charlie Rodríguez
- 2001–2005: Antonio Fas Alzamora
- 2005–2009: Kenneth McClintock
- 2009–2013: Thomas Rivera Schatz
- 2013–2017: Eduardo Bhatia
- 2017–2021: Thomas Rivera Schatz
- 2021–2025: José Luis Dalmau
- 2025–Present: Thomas Rivera Schatz

=== President pro tempore ===
The president pro tempore is the second highest-ranking officer of the Senate and substitutes the president of the House in his absence. Its counterpart in the House is the speaker pro tempore.

The current president pro tempore is Marially González Huertas, senator for District V Ponce from the Popular Democratic Party.

- 1917–1921: Eduardo Georgetti
- 1921–1924: Juan Hernández López
- 1926–1929: Luis Sánchez Morales
- 1929–1933: Celestino Iriarte Miró
- 1933–1940: Bolívar Pagán
- 1940–1941: Luis Padrón Rivera
- 1941–1944: Francisco M. Susoni Abreu
- 1945–1949: Samuel R. Quiñones
- 1949–1969: Luis Negrón López
- 1969–1973: Juan Cancel Ríos
- 1973–1977: Miguel Hernández Agosto
- 1977–1981: Manuel Ramos Barroso
- 1981–1988: Sergio Peña Clos
- 1989–1993: Miguel Deynes Soto
- 1993–1995: Nicolás Nogueras
- 1995–1997: Luisa Lebrón de Rivera
- 1997–2000: Aníbal Marrero Pérez
- 2000–2001: Luz Arce Ferrer
- 2001–2005: Velda González de Modestti
- 2005–2009: Orlando Parga Figueroa
- 2009–2013: Margarita Nolasco Santiago
- 2013–2017: José Luis Dalmau
- 2017–2020: Larry Seilhamer
- 2020-2021: Henry Neumann
- 2021-2025: Marially González Huertas
- 2025-Present: Carmelo Ríos Santiago and Marissa Jiménez

=== Party leaders ===
Each party elects floor leaders denominated "majority leader" or "minority leader", accordingly, as well as a "majority whip" or a "minority whip". Floor leaders act as the party chief spokespeople. The current leaders are Majority Leader Gregorio Matías Rosario, Majority Whip Juan Oscar Morales; PPD Minority Leader Luis Javier Hernández Ortiz, PPD Minority Whip Marially González Huertas; PIP Minority Leader María de Lourdes Santiago; and PIP Minority Whip Adrian González Costa.

=== Non-member officers ===
The Senate is served by two elected officials who are not members.

The Senate's chief legislative officer is the secretary of the Senate, who maintains public records, disburses salaries, monitors the acquisition of stationery and supplies, and oversees clerks.

The other official is the sergeant-at-arms who, as the Senate's chief law enforcement officer, maintains order and security on the Senate floor and other premises.

These officers are elected by the Senate, usually during its inaugural session, immediately after the election of the body's president. The current secretary is Jenniffer Martínez Heyer while the current sergeant-at-arms is Manuel Vélez Lacomba.

== Current composition ==
The current session is the 28th Senate of Puerto Rico, the upper house of the 20th Legislative Assembly of Puerto Rico, which will meet from January 2, 2025, to January 1, 2029. All members were elected in the general elections of 2020 with a plurality or relative majority coming from the New Progressive Party. The other major party, the Popular Democratic Party resulted with the second largest number of seats. The Puerto Rican Independence Party elected two member At-large senators. One seat to Proyecto Dignidad, in addition to one independent candidate.

- District I San Juan: Juan Oscar Morales
- District I San Juan: Nitza Morán
- District II Bayamón: Carmelo Ríos
- District II Bayamón: Migdalia Padilla
- District III Arecibo: Héctor Gabriel González
- District III Arecibo: Brenda Pérez Soto
- District IV Mayagüez–Aguadilla: Karen Michelle Román
- District IV Mayagüez–Aguadilla: Jeison Rosa Ramos
- District V Ponce: Jamie Barlucea Rodríguez
- District V Ponce: Marially González Huertas
- District VI Guayama: Wilmer Reyes Berríos
- District VI Guayama: Rafael Santos Ortiz
- District VII Humacao: Luis Daniel Colón La Santa
- District VII Humacao: Wanda Soto Tolentino
- District VIII Carolina: Marissa Jiménez
- District VIII Carolina: Héctor Joaquín Sánchez
- At-large: María de Lourdes Santiago
- At-large: Adrián González Costa
- At-large: Joanne Rodríguez Veve
- At-large: Gregorio Matías Rosario
- At-large: Roxanna Soto Aguilú
- At-large: Thomas Rivera Schatz
- At-large: Ángel Toledo López
- At-large: Ada Alvarez Conde
- At-large: José Luis Dalmau
- At-large: Luis Javier Hernández Ortiz
- At-large: José A. Santiago
- At-large: Eliezer Molina Pérez

== Other organizations ==
The Office of Legislative Services was headed in early 2009 by Kevin Rivera, while Eliezer Velázquez currently serves as Superintendent of the Capitol, the first to serve during two four-year terms.

The Puerto Rico Legislative Assembly also receives support services from the Council of State Governments (CSG), CSG's Eastern Regional Conference, the National Conference of State Legislatures (NCSL) and the National Hispanic Caucus of State Legislators (NHCSL).

== See also ==
- List of former members of the Senate of Puerto Rico
