= Rafael Arrillaga Torrens =

Puerto Rican cardiologist and writer

Speaker of the Puerto Rico House of Representatives
- In office 1943–1944
- Preceded by: Samuel R. Quiñones
- Succeeded by: Rafael Rodríguez Pacheco

Member of the Puerto Rico House of Representatives from the Manatí District
- In office 1940–1944

Personal details
- Born: April 16, 1913 Añasco, Puerto Rico
- Died: January 1, 2006 (aged 92)
- Education: College of William & Mary (BA); Yale School of Medicine (MD-PhD)
- Occupation: Doctor, author and politician
- Profession: cardiologist

Rafael Arrillaga Torrens (April 16, 1913 – January 1, 2006) was a Puerto Rican politician and medical doctor.

He was born in Añasco, Puerto Rico on April 16, 1913. He attended primary and secondary school in his hometown and in Mayaguez. He earned a B.A. in mathematics and physics from the College of William & Mary, in Williamsburg, Virginia in 1932, and obtained his PhD degree in medicine from the Yale School of Medicine in 1936.

Torrens returned to Puerto Rico and settled in San Juan to a start his private practice in cardiology and simultaneously started a political career. In 1940 Torrens elected to the House of Representatives of Puerto Rico in the Manatí district and in 1943 was elected Speaker of the Puerto Rico House of Representatives and served until 1944. He was affiliated with the Independence party of Puerto Rico.

Torrens retired from politics and returned to medicine at the Professional Hospital in Santurce and worked as the director of the Center for Advanced Studies of Puerto Rico and the Caribbean. He died in 2006 at age 92.

== Works ==
Torrens authored a number of books, many on philosophical thought, which were published in Madrid, Argentina and Mexico:

- Memoria de un viaje en el tiempo (1963) (transl. Memory of a trip through time), for which he received a prize from the Institute of Puerto Rican Literature
- Raíces hispánicas en Benedictus de Spinoza (1973) (transl. The Spanish roots of Benedictus de Spinoza)
- La filosofía griega. Introducciónal pensamiento moderno (1976) (transl. Greek Philosophy. An introduction to modern thinking)
- Soñar y hacer (1977) (transl. Dream and do)
- Kant y el idealismo trascendental (1979) (transl. Kant and transcendental idealism), which he wrote in German and later translated to and published in Spanish
- Introducción a los problemas de la historia (1982) (transl. Introduction to the problems of history)
- Dialéctica y marxismo Utopía y realidad en el mundo actual (1989) (transl. Reasoning and Marxism Utopia and reality in the world)
- La naturaleza del conocer (1987) (transl. The nature of knowing)
- Grandeza y decadencia de España en el siglo XVI (transl. Greatness and decadence of Spain in the XVI century)

Political offices
Preceded by Samuel R. Quiñones	Speaker of the Puerto Rico House of Representatives; 1943–1944	Succeeded by Rafael Rodríguez Pacheco
