= Luis Negrón López =

Puerto Rican politician

Member of the Puerto Rico House of Representatives for the Sabana Grande, San Germán district
- In office 1940–1944

Member of the Puerto Rico Senate from the Mayagüez district
- In office January 1946 – January 1969

President pro tempore of the Puerto Rico Senate
- In office January 1949 – January 1969
- Preceded by: Samuel R. Quiñones
- Succeeded by: Juan Cancel Ríos

Personal details
- Born: April 19, 1909 Sabana Grande, Puerto Rico
- Died: September 18, 1991 (aged 82) Sabana Grande, Puerto Rico
- Party: Popular Democratic
- Other political affiliations: Democratic
- Education: University of Puerto Rico (BA) University of Puerto Rico School of Law (JD, LLB)

Luis Negrón López (April 19, 1909 – September 18, 1991) was a politician from Puerto Rico. Negrón was among the founding members of the Popular Democratic Party (PPD) and served as Senator and as candidate for Governor of Puerto Rico in the elections of 1968.

== Early life and education ==
Negrón López was born Sabana Grande, Puerto Rico, in 1909. He graduated from Lola Rodríguez de Tió High School in San Germán, Puerto Rico. Went on to the University of Puerto Rico at Rio Piedras in 1932 where he earned a Bachelor in Arts. Two years later he received his law degree and dedicated himself to private practice until 1948.

== Political career ==
In 1940, he helped Luis Muñoz Marín and others in the creation of the Popular Democratic Party. In the elections of that year, Negrón was elected Representative to the Puerto Rican Legislature.

In the elections of 1944, Negrón is then elected to Senate of Puerto Rico. He worked closely with then Senate President Muñoz Marín in the implementation of legislation that eventually became the ground work of Operation Bootstrap.

Negrón López was among the members of the Constitutional Assembly that in 1952 drafted the Constitution of Puerto Rico. After that, Negrón continued to serve in the Senate, a post that he held until 1968.

That year, incumbent Governor Roberto Sánchez Vilella had a serious dispute with the leaders of the PPD and was barred from seeking a second term as Governor under the party's insignia. Negrón was then chosen as the new candidate for Governor of Puerto Rico. However, Governor Sánchez had founded a new party, the People's Party, and was also seeking reelection. This caused a division inside the PPD that caused the defeat of both Sánchez and Negrón. Instead, Luis A. Ferré of the New Progressive Party was elected Governor. This was the first electoral defeat ever for the PPD.

== Later and death ==
After the elections of 1968, Negrón retired from public life. Negrón López died on September 18, 1991, when he was 82 years old. He was buried at the Sabana Grande Masonic Cemetery in Sabana Grande, Puerto Rico. The town of Sabana Grande named the high school after him.

Senate of Puerto Rico
Preceded by Samuel R. Quiñones	President pro tempore of the Puerto Rico Senate; 1949–1969	Succeeded by Juan Cancel Ríos
Party political offices
Preceded by Roberto Sánchez Vilella	Popular Democratic nominee for Governor of Puerto Rico; 1968	Succeeded by Rafael Hernández Colón
