= Celestino Iriarte Miró =

Puerto Rican politician (1887–1967)

Member of the Puerto Rico Senate from the San Juan district
- In office 1921–1945

President pro tempore of the Senate of Puerto Rico
- In office 1929–1933
- Preceded by: Luis Sánchez Morales
- Succeeded by: Bolívar Pagán

Personal details
- Born: December 9, 1887 San Juan, Puerto Rico
- Died: January 1967 (aged 80) Guaynabo, Puerto Rico
- Party: Union of Puerto Rico (from year x to year y); Alianza Puertorriqueña (from year A to year B); Republican Union (from year C to year D)
- Profession: Politician

Celestino Iriarte Miró (December 9, 1887 – January 1967) was a Puerto Rican politician and longtime Senator. He was a member of the Senate of Puerto Rico from 1920 to 1944.

== Biography ==
Celestino Iriarte Miró was born in 1887 in San Juan, Puerto Rico. He worked at the Telégrafo of San Juan and Aguadilla between 1905 and 1910. Iriarte graduated as an attorney from the Supreme Court of Puerto Rico in 1910.

Iriarte was President of the Union Youth of San Juan from 1910 to 1912, and a delegate of the Union Party to direct elections in Moca in 1912. He also presided the local Committee of the Union Party of San Juan from 1912 to 1924.

Iriarte ran for the Puerto Rico House of Representatives in 1917 for the Union Party, but lost. However, he was elected to the Senate of Puerto Rico in 1920. He was reelected in 1924 and 1928, this time with the Alianza Puertorriqueña. From 1930 to 1933, he served as President pro tempore under Luis Sánchez Morales. For the 1932 elections, he ran for the Republican Union party, being reelected once again. He remained in his seat until 1944, when he ran for Representative.

Iriarte was member of the Commission of Reforms to the Organic Act formed by President Franklin D. Roosevelt. He was also member of the Status Commission from 1945 to 1946. In 1948, he returned to the Senate for the Statehood Party. In 1951, he was also member of the Constituent Assembly that created the Estado Libre Asociado, representing the Statehood Party.

Iriarte died in January 1967, at the age of 80. He was buried at the Santa María Magdalena de Pazzis Cemetery in San Juan, Puerto Rico.

Political offices
Preceded by Luis Sánchez Morales	President pro tempore of the Senate of Puerto Rico; 1929–33	Succeeded by Bolívar Pagán
Party political offices
Preceded by Rafael Martínez Nadal	Chairman of the Puerto Rico Republican Party; 1940–1952	Succeeded by Miguel A. García Méndez
