= Marially González Huertas =

Member of the Senate of Puerto Rico

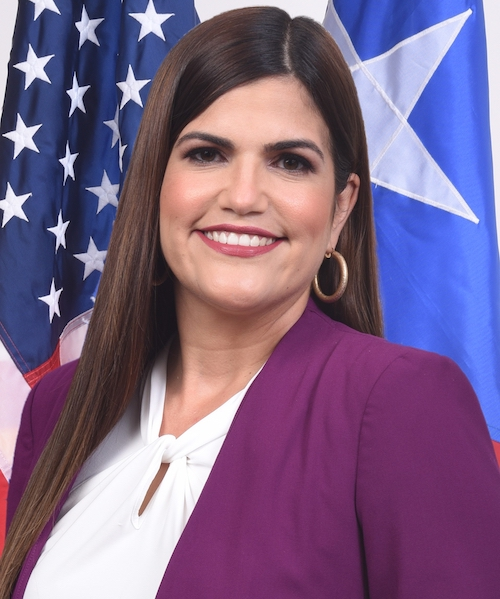

President pro tempore of the Puerto Rico Senate
- In office 2 January 2021 – 2 January 2025
- Preceded by: Henry Neumann
- Succeeded by: Carmelo Ríos Santiago

Member of the Puerto Rico Senate from the 5th district
- Incumbent
- Assumed office 2 January 2021

Personal details
- Born: 16 August 1981 (age 45) Utuado, Puerto Rico
- Party: Popular Democratic
- Education: University of Puerto Rico, Río Piedras (BS); Interamerican University, San Germán (MS, PhD)

Marially González Huertas (born 16 August 1981) is a Puerto Rican senator for the district of Ponce, Puerto Rico. She was born on 16 August 1981 in Utuado, Puerto Rico. She resides in the town of Jayuya, where she was raised with her parents, Hilda Huertas and Jorge González Otero, the Mayor of Jayuya. She is a member of Puerto Rico's Partido Popular Democratico and previously served as President pro tempore of the Puerto Rico Senate.

González Huertas graduated from Josefina León Zayas High School in Jayuya. She holds a Bachelor of Science in Social Sciences with a concentration in psychology from the University of Puerto Rico, Río Piedras Campus and later graduated from the Doctoral Program in School Psychology at the Interamerican University of Puerto Rico.

== See also ==
- List of Puerto Ricans

Senate of Puerto Rico
Preceded by Henry Neumann	President pro tempore of the Puerto Rico Senate; 2021–2025	Succeeded by Carmelo Ríos Santiago
