= Francisco M. Susoni Abreu =

Puerto Rican politician

Member of the Puerto Rico Senate from the Arecibo district
- In office 1917–1921
- In office 1941–1945

Member of the Senate of Puerto Rico from the at-large district
- In office 1921–1925

President pro tempore of the Senate of Puerto Rico
- In office 1941–1944

16th Speaker of the Puerto Rico House of Representatives
- In office 1945–1948

Personal details
- Born: Francisco María Susoni Abreu; September 11, 1875 Hatillo, Puerto Rico
- Died: November 28, 1954 (aged 79) Arecibo, Puerto Rico
- Party: Union of Puerto Rico; Alianza Puertorriqueña; Popular Democratic Party; Puerto Rican Independence Party
- Education: University of Santiago de Compostela (MD)
- Occupation: Politician, Senator

Francisco María Susoni Abreu (September 11, 1875 – November 28, 1954) was a Puerto Rican politician and senator. He was a member of the first Puerto Rican Senate formed in 1917, representing the District of Arecibo. He returned to politics in the 1940s, and was elected again as senator for the Popular Democratic Party (PPD). Dr. Susoni was the first candidate for governor of the Puerto Rican Independence Party in 1948, political party founded in 1946 in spite of all the obstacles imposed by the colonial establishment.

== Biography ==
Francisco Susoni Abreu was born in Hatillo, Puerto Rico, on September 11, 1875. He studied medicine at University of Santiago de Compostela in Spain, graduating in 1899.

In 1917, Susoni was elected to the first Puerto Rican Senate, representing the District of Arecibo for the Union of Puerto Rico party.

Susoni was part of the Board of the Union party, but he parted ways with it in 1929 when the party joined the Republican Party. In 1932, he joined the Liberal Party of Puerto Rico, but in 1936 he joined the faction led by Luis Muñoz Marín demanding independence to the island.

Susoni was a participant in the founding of the Popular Democratic Party in 1938 and was reelected to the Senate of Puerto Rico in 1940. He served as its President pro tempore from 1941 to 1944. He was reelected in 1944, but was asked by his party to join the Puerto Rico House of Representatives instead. Susoni served as Speaker of the House in 1945.

Due to differences with the leadership, Susoni resigned his seat on June 5, 1948, and joined the newly established Puerto Rican Independence Party. He was their candidate for Governor at the 1948 general elections.

Susoni died on November 28, 1954, in Isabela, Puerto Rico.

== See also ==
- List of Puerto Ricans

Political offices
Preceded by Luis Padrón Rivera	President pro tempore of the Senate of Puerto Rico; 1941-44	Succeeded by Samuel R. Quiñones
Preceded by María L. Gómez Garriga	Speaker of the Puerto Rico House of Representatives; 1945–1948	Succeeded by Ernesto Ramos Antonini
