= Juan Hernández López =

Puerto Rican politician

Member of the Puerto Rico Senate from the San Juan district
- In office 1921–1925

Member of the Senate of Puerto Rico from the at-large district
- In office 1925–1933

President pro tempore of the Senate of Puerto Rico
- In office 1921–1924
- Preceded by: Eduardo Georgetti
- Succeeded by: Luis Sánchez Morales

Personal details
- Born: March 1859 San Juan, Puerto Rico
- Died: May 17, 1944 (aged 85) San Juan, Puerto Rico
- Party: Union of Puerto Rico
- Other political affiliations: Republican Party; Alianza Puertorriqueña
- Occupation: Politician, Senator, Attorney

Juan Hernández López (March 1859 – May 17, 1944) was a Puerto Rican politician, senator, and attorney. He was a member of the Senate from 1921 to 1933, and served as its President pro tempore from 1921 to 1924, under Antonio R. Barceló.

== Biography ==
Juan Hernández López was born in March 1859 in San Juan, Puerto Rico. He studied in Spain, graduating in 1881. After that, he returned to Puerto Rico to work as an attorney. He joined the Autonomist Party with Román Baldorioty de Castro, and served as one of its secretaries and co-author of its program in 1887.

Hernández collaborated with the newspaper El Clamor del País and defended journalists that were persecuted for political reasons. He also presided the Ateneo Puertorriqueño and was vice-president of his own party during Luis Muñoz Rivera's presidency in 1897.

Hernández also worked as Secretary of Public Works and Communication in the Autonomic Cabinet of 1898. He was vocal in the Commission organized to review the laws of Puerto Rico upon the installation of the Foraker Act in 1900. Hernández was also a delegate to the House of Representatives in 1903 for the Republican Party, presiding the Judicial Committee. During that time, he was author and co-author of several laws established in the island. From 1904 to 1906, he presided the Republican Party.

In 1920, Hernández was elected to the Senate of Puerto Rico for the District of San Juan. In 1921, he was elected as President pro tempore under Antonio R. Barceló. He was reelected in 1924 and 1928, this time under the Alianza Puertorriqueña party.

After finishing his last term in 1932, Hernández retired from politics to dedicate to his private law practice until his death. Died on May 17, 1944. Was buried at the Puerto Rico Memorial Cemetery in Carolina, Puerto Rico.

== See also ==
- List of Puerto Ricans

Political offices
| Preceded by Eduardo Georgetti | President pro tempore of the Senate of Puerto Rico; 1921-24 | Succeeded by Luis Sánchez Morales |
