= Luis Padrón Rivera =

Puerto Rican politician

Lino Padrón Rivera

Member of the Puerto Rico Senate from the at-large district
- In office 1940–1945

President pro tempore of the Senate of Puerto Rico
- In office 1940–1941
- Preceded by: Bolívar Pagán
- Succeeded by: Francisco M. Susoni

Member of the Puerto Rico House of Representatives from the 6th District
- In office 1933–1940

Personal details
- Born: September 28, 1892 Fajardo, Puerto Rico
- Died: July 9, 1960 (aged 67) Santurce, Puerto Rico
- Party: Republican Union
- Other political affiliations: Republican
- Profession: Politician, Senator

Lino Padrón Rivera (September 28, 1892 - July 9, 1960) was a Puerto Rican teacher, politician, Representative, and Senator. He was a member of the Puerto Rico House of Representatives from 1933 to 1940, when he joined the Senate of Puerto Rico. He served as senator until 1945.

== Biography ==
Lino Padrón Rivera, was born on September 28, 1892, in Fajardo, Puerto Rico, had most of his primary education in Fajardo and Bayamón. Lived for many years in Vega Baja, Puerto Rico.

Padrón was an active member of the Socialist Party for a long time. For the Puerto Rican 1932 general elections, the Socialist Party merged with the Republican Party, and Padrón was elected to the Puerto Rico House of Representatives representing District #6.

Padrón served as Representative until February 1940. That year, Resident Commissioner Santiago Iglesias Pantín died, prompting Senator Bolívar Pagán to take his place in Washington, DC. Padrón was then asked to fill Pagán's seat for the remainder of the term. Padrón also assumed Pagán's duties as President pro tempore until 1941.

In the Puerto Rican 1940 general elections, Padrón was reelected as Senator, but he didn't remain as president pro tempore. Later during the term, Padrón assumed the presidency of his party, but was replaced later by Antonio Reyes Delgado.

Padrón was one of the members of the Constituting Assembly that created the Estado Libre Asociado in 1951–1952.

Padrón married Carmen Martínez de Padrón and had eight children: Mireya Padrón y Martínez, Trinidad Padrón y Martínez, Lino Padrón y Martínez, Edgardo Padrón y Martínez, Brunilda Padrón y Martínez, Jorge Padrón y Martínez, Carmen Padrón (now Padrón-Crespo), and Sigfrido Padrón y Martínez.

Padrón died on July 9, 1960, in Santurce, Puerto Rico at age 67 after a battle with skin cancer.

== Legacy ==
A high school in Vega Baja, Puerto Rico was named after Lino Padrón Rivera. In the “About Us” section of the school's website, it is written “ Don Lino Padrón Rivera was born on September 23, 1892 in the city of Fajardo, Puerto Rico. He studied at the College of Farmers and Mechanical Arts of the University of Puerto Rico in Mayagüez. He was a cartographer, reader of Tobacco workshops; and with the trade of cigar maker with number 481 of the Central Workers Union of Bayamón. He fought against the exploitation of the poor, to the point that he was imprisoned, later pardoned by the then governor of Puerto Rico, Montgomery Riley (known as Moncho Reyes). He served in various positions in Puerto Rican politics between 1933-1952.”

Senate of Puerto Rico
Preceded by Bolívar Pagán	President pro tempore of the Senate of Puerto Rico; 1940–41	Succeeded by Francisco M. Susoni
