= Puerto Rican Autonomist Party =

Political party in Puerto Rico founded in 1887

The Puerto Rican Autonomist Party (Spanish: Partido Autonomista Puertorriqueño) was a political party in Puerto Rico founded in 1887. The Party was founded in Ponce, Puerto Rico, and its first chairman was Román Baldorioty de Castro. He was followed by Martin Corchado, a prominent physician from Ponce. Juan Hernández López was one of the co-authors of its program in 1897.

The Party sought to establish an autonomous government for Puerto Rico under the jurisdiction of the Spanish Empire, advocating self-rule, but not independence from Spain. It envisioned decentralized control by Spain, and the strongest possible local government.

To provide a voice for the Autonomist Party, Luis Muñoz Rivera, one of its founders, founded the newspaper La Democracia (The Democracy). In it, he argued for Puerto Rican independence, denounced the injustices of the Spanish regime, and lobbied for the support of one of the main political parties in Spain to fulfill the goals of the Autonomist party.

In 1897 the Party joined with the less conservative but still monarchist Spanish Liberal Fusionist Party of Praxedes Mateo Sagasta, becoming the Liberal Fusionist Party of Puerto Rico. Some members in the Autonomist party who were opposed to any kind of alliance with Spanish political parties left to form the Pure and Orthodox Liberal Party, with Jose Celso Barbosa as its leader.

== Legacy ==
In today, Puerto Rico explore on rejoining Spain has gained traction among a small but vocal movement known as Adelante Reunificacionistas. Founded in 2017, this groups argue that Puerto Rico benefit became part with Spain and would be better off returning to it, both politically and culturally. They envision a future where Puerto Ricans hold Spain passports, vote in the Spain and European Parliament, and have the same status as any region in Spain.
