= Eduardo Georgetti =

Puerto Rican politician

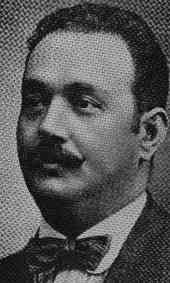

Member of Puerto Rican Senate from at-large district
- In office 1917–1921

President pro tempore of the Senate of Puerto Rico
- In office 1917–1921
- Succeeded by: Juan Hernández López

Personal details
- Born: 11 October 1866 Manatí, Puerto Rico
- Died: 26 November 1937 (aged 71) Santurce, Puerto Rico
- Party: Union of Puerto Rico; Alianza Puertorriqueña
- Occupation: Politician, senator, farmer, businessman
- Georgetti was the first vice-president of the Puerto Rican Senate

Eduardo Georgetti (11 October 1866 – 26 November 1937), was an agriculturist, businessman, philanthropist, and politician. Georgetti, who came from a family of landowners, became one of Puerto Rico's wealthiest sugar barons and benefactors. In 1917, he became the first vice-president of the Puerto Rican Senate.

== Early years ==
Georgetti (sometimes also spelled as "Giorgetti") was born in the town of Manatí. His father was Dr. Pedro Juan Giorgetti Battesti, an immigrant from Corsica and his mother Guadalupe Fernandez Vanga y Freites, native of Puerto Rico whose family were land owners. He became orphaned at a young age and went to live with his maternal uncle. He received his primary education in the Colegio de los Jesuitas de San Juan (School of the Jesuits of San Juan). Georgetti inherited the lands of his parents which his uncle administrated, during the time that he was in Corsica pursuing his secondary education at the Liceo de Córcega (Lyceum of Corsica).

== Sugar baron ==
Upon his return to Puerto Rico he found that the lands which he had left in the hands of his uncle had prospered enormously. Georgetti married Aúrea Balseiro Dávila in 1888. Together with his father-in-law, Rafael Balseiro, he purchased a company called Florida Agrícola and renamed it Sociedad Agrícola Industrial Balseiro y Georgetti (the Balseiro and Georgetti Industrial Agricultural Society). Georgetti founded and was the owner of the Plazuela Sugar Company, a sugar refinery, in the town of Barceloneta which had its own dock that was used to transport sugar by barge to the waiting ships on the ocean. The company, which was the core of his fortune, was the main source of income and employment of the towns' inhabitants.

Georgetti expanded his sugar industry empire by purchasing land and other sugar refineries. Among the sugar plantations which Georgetti purchased were Los Canos in Arecibo and the Central Plata, in which he served as the corporation's president. He was also the owner of the island's second largest pineapple plantation. Giorgetti was also a member of the board of directors of various banks, including the American Colonial Bank, Banco Comercial de Puerto Rico and Banco Nova Scotia.

== Political career ==
It was common practice in Puerto Rico for businessmen to become involved in politics. On 23 December 1897, Georgetti was named Mayor of Barceloneta by Sabas Marin Gonzalez, the then-appointed Spanish governor of Puerto Rico. After the United States invaded Puerto Rico and the island became a U.S. territory as a result of the Treaty of Paris of 1898, which ended the Spanish–American War, the military-appointed governor, Major General John R. Brooke, permitted, upon the advice of Luis Muñoz Rivera, that Georgetti continue as mayor. Under the new administration, Barceloneta was merged with the town of Manati, as part of a joint municipality. Georgetti did not agree with this, and fought successfully for the re-establishment of Barceloneta as a separate, stand-alone municipality.

Georgetti continued to serve as mayor of Barceloneta from 1897 to 1898. He was a member of the Liberal Party of Puerto Rico, which supported the Spanish government headed by Práxedes Mateo Sagasta, which had promised an autonomous government for Puerto Rico. After the Spanish–American War, when Puerto Rico was ceded to the United States, Georgetti, together with his friend Luis Muñoz Rivera, Rosendo Matienzo Cintrón, Antonio R. Barceló and José de Diego, founded the Union Party of Puerto Rico. The party won the elections in 1904 and Georgetti was elected to the Puerto Rican House of Representatives. This Union Party opposed the passage of the U.S. Foraker Act, which extended every U.S. federal law into Puerto Rico, and subsumed the entire body of Puerto Rico's statutory and regulatory code under the framework of U.S. federal law. The Union Party also favored the acquisition of greater political autonomy for Puerto Rico, as a pathway to full independence.

In 1916, Georgetti's long-time friend Luis Muñoz Rivera fell gravely ill in New York City and returned to Puerto Rico, staying in Georgetti's house to recuperate. Georgetti summoned Muñoz Rivera's wife and son, Luis Muñoz Marín, to Puerto Rico and informed them that he was suffering from an infection that had begun in the gallbladder, before expanding throughout his body. On 15 November 1916, Muñoz Rivera died during his stay in the Georgetti residence. Georgetti's 1914 Pierce Arrow automobile was used in the statesman's funeral procession. Together with a group of friends, Georgetti purchased Muñoz Rivera's newspaper La Democracia and provided Muñoz Rivera's widow Amalia Marín Castilla with a small monthly pension. La Democracia also provided Rivera's son, Muñoz Marin, with an outlet to publish his written works. Georgetti also purchased the Muñoz Rivera home in 1916 and donated it together with the Pierce Arrow car to the town of Barranquitas to be preserved as a national monument.

After Muñoz Rivera's death, Barceló became the leading force behind the Union Party and its liberal ideas for the island. In the elections of 1917, the Union Party was victorious. Antonio R. Barceló was named President of the Puerto Rican Senate and Georgetti was named vice-president, thus becoming the first Puerto Rican to hold said position. In 1924, Barceló later formed a political coalition with José Tous Soto, the president of the pro-statehood Republican Party of Puerto Rico, and founded the Alianza Puertorriqueña (Puerto Rican Alliance). This coalition came about because both Barceló and Tous Soto came to believe that neither independence nor statehood would be considered by the United States. Therefore, rather than wage a futile political battle, their "Alliance" would concentrate on Puerto Rico's economic situation. This led to ideological conflict between Georgetti and Barceló.

Georgetti was committed to the original independentista ideals of the Union Party, and found these incompatible with an "economic partnership" with the United States, as espoused by the Alliance coalition. Barceló and a group of party delegates had traveled to Washington, D.C. to seek changes in the Jones Act of 1917, by claiming that the Puerto Rican economy was sound and that Puerto Ricans were capable of electing their own governor. In response, Georgetti traveled to Washington as a representative of various island organizations, among them the Agriculturist Association and the Association of Sugar Producers. The group which he represented became known by the press as the Fuerzas Vivas (Live Forces).

Georgetti and the Fuerzas Vivas submitted a "Fiscal Memorandum" to the U.S. Secretary of War, which presented a much bleaker view of the Puerto Rican economy. According to this memorandum, the island was on the brink of economic ruin unless it diversified its agricultural production, and become less dependent on the sugar industry as its sole source of income. Georgetti's actions were viewed by Barceló as an attempt by Georgetti and the Fuerzas Vivas to discredit Barceló and weaken the Alliance. Georgetti denied this, and quit the Alliance.

== Later years ==
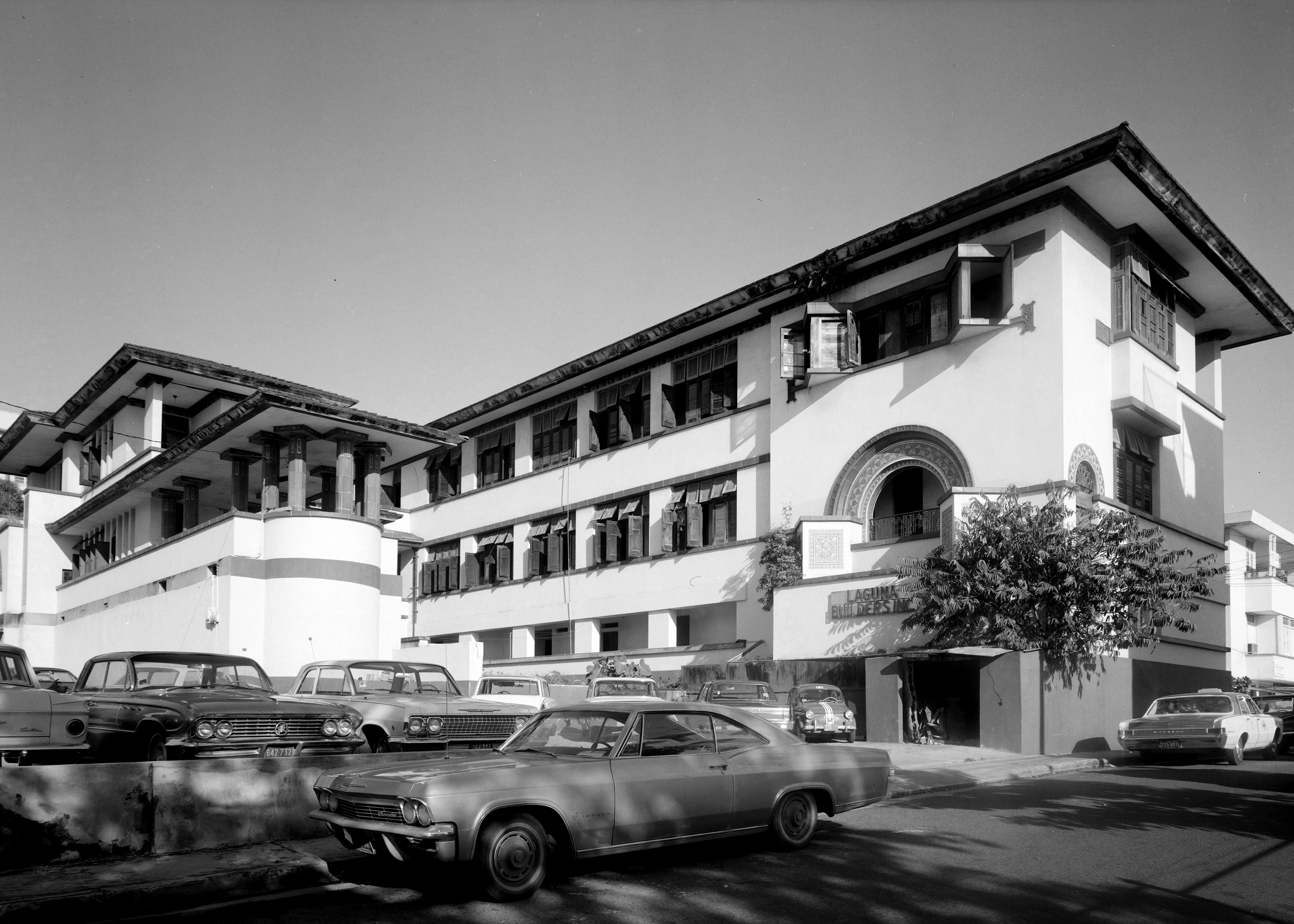
Mansion Georgetti (1923), Santurce, Puerto Rico, Photo: Gil Amiaga

In 1923, Georgetti and his wife built a mansion in Santurce. Known as the "Mansion Georgetti," it was located on the Avenida Ponce de León (Ponce de León Avenue), designed and built by Czech architect Antonin Nechodoma, and considered to be the grandest mansion in the Caribbean at the time.

Prior to the mansion, Georgetti lived in a Rio Piedras house built in 1868. The house, known as the "Casa Georgetti," is the oldest Spanish colonial structure in Puerto Rico.

Georgetti and his wife did not have any offspring, however they were the benefactors of many talented children who lacked the economic means to pursue an education. As a philanthropist, he was a sponsor of the arts and sciences. Georgetti was also the president of the Children's Tuberculosis Sanitarium of Puerto Rico.

Eduardo Georgetti died in his Santurce residence on 26 November 1937. He was buried at Santa María Magdalena de Pazzis Cemetery. His wife Aúrea died the following year. Their Mansion Georgetti was sold in 1971, demolished, and replaced with an apartment building complex.

The Casa Georgetti in Rio Piedras was landmarked and restored to its original condition.

== Legacy ==
The town of Barceloneta honored Georgetti's memory by naming a principal avenue and an urbanization (Villa Georgetti) after him. In the town of Santurce there is also a theater, Teatro Georgetti, named in his honor. Other cities in Puerto Rico have honored his memory by naming several streets after him, including San Juan, Humacao, Comerío and Vega Alta.

== See also ==
- List of Puerto Ricans
- Corsican immigration to Puerto Rico

Political offices
Preceded by None	President pro tempore of the Senate of Puerto Rico; 1917–21	Succeeded by Juan Hernández López
