= Samuel R. Quiñones =

Puerto Rican politician

The Honorable Samuel Ramón Quiñones
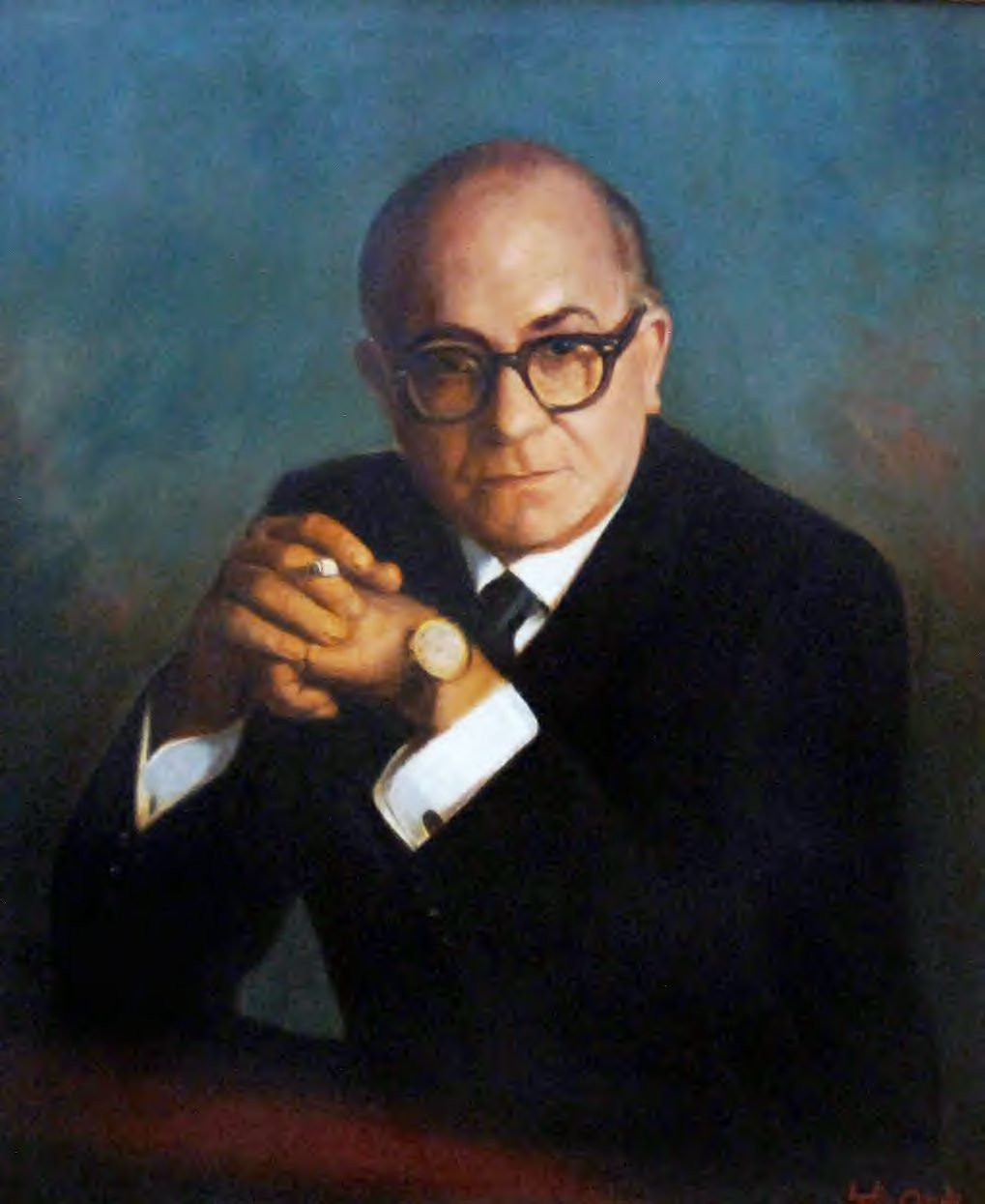

Member of the Puerto Rico Senate from the at-large district
- In office 1944–1968

5th President of the Senate of Puerto Rico
- In office 1949–1968
- Preceded by: Luis Muñoz Marín
- Succeeded by: Rafael Hernández Colón

Speaker of the House of Representatives of Puerto Rico
- In office 1941–1943
- Preceded by: Miguel A. García Méndez
- Succeeded by: Rafael Arrillaga Torrens

President pro tempore of the Senate of Puerto Rico
- In office 1945–1948
- Preceded by: Francisco M. Susoni
- Succeeded by: Luis Negrón López

Personal details
- Born: Samuel Ramón Quiñones Quiñones; October 29, 1903 San Juan, Puerto Rico
- Died: March 11, 1976 (aged 71) San Juan, Puerto Rico
- Resting place: Santa María Magdalena de Pazzis Cemetery
- Party: Popular Democratic Party (PPD)
- Education: University of Puerto Rico School of Law (JD)
- Profession: Politician, attorney

Samuel Ramón Quiñones Quiñones (October 29, 1903 – March 11, 1976), commonly known as Samuel R. Quiñones, was a prominent attorney in Puerto Rico who served as Speaker of the House of Representatives of Puerto Rico from 1941 to 1943 and for twenty years in the Senate of Puerto Rico as its fifth President, from 1949 to 1968, by far the longest serving Senate President. He is also the only person to hold both posts.

== Biography ==
Samuel Ramón Quiñones Quiñones was born in San Juan, Puerto Rico to his parents Don Francisco Quiñones and Doña Dolores Quiñones. Graduated from Central High School in Santurce. He studied law at the University of Puerto Rico School of Law.

During the 1930s and 1940s, he served on various organizations: President of Ateneo Puertorriqueño (1934–1937), President of Colegio de Abogados (1943–1945), President of House of Representatives in Puerto Rico (1941–1943), Vice President for the Senate of Puerto Rico (1945), and elected President of PPD (Partido Popular Democrático) in 1938. He had also served as Speaker of the House of Representatives of Puerto Rico in the early 1940s. During his terms in office as President of the Senate, he commissioned the famed Toro & Ferrer architectural firm to design the Senate Annex office building, which was inaugurated in 1955.

Between 1951 and 1952, he served as one of the most prominent members of the Constitutional Convention of Puerto Rico that drafted the Constitution of the Commonwealth of Puerto Rico.

A prolific poet and writer, he founded the literary magazine called Índice. In 1941 he published an essay book: Temas y letras.

Quiñones died in San Juan, Puerto Rico by his mouth cancer on March 11, 1976, at the age of 71. Was buried at Santa María Magdalena de Pazzis Cemetery in San Juan, Puerto Rico.

Political offices
Preceded by Luis Muñoz Marín	President of the Senate of Puerto Rico; 1949-1968	Succeeded by Rafael Hernández Colón
Preceded by Francisco M. Susoni	President pro tempore of the Senate of Puerto Rico; 1945-1948	Succeeded by Luis Negrón López
Preceded by Miguel A. García Méndez	Speaker of the Puerto Rico House of Representatives; 1941-1943	Succeeded by Rafael Arrillaga Torrens

== See also ==
- List of Puerto Ricans

== Sources ==
- "Legisladores puertorriqueños 1900-1996", by Nestor Rigual
- "Elecciones y Partidos Politicos de Puerto Rico 1809-2000", by Fernando Bayron Toro
