= Antonio Rafael Barceló =

Puerto Rican politician (1868–1938)

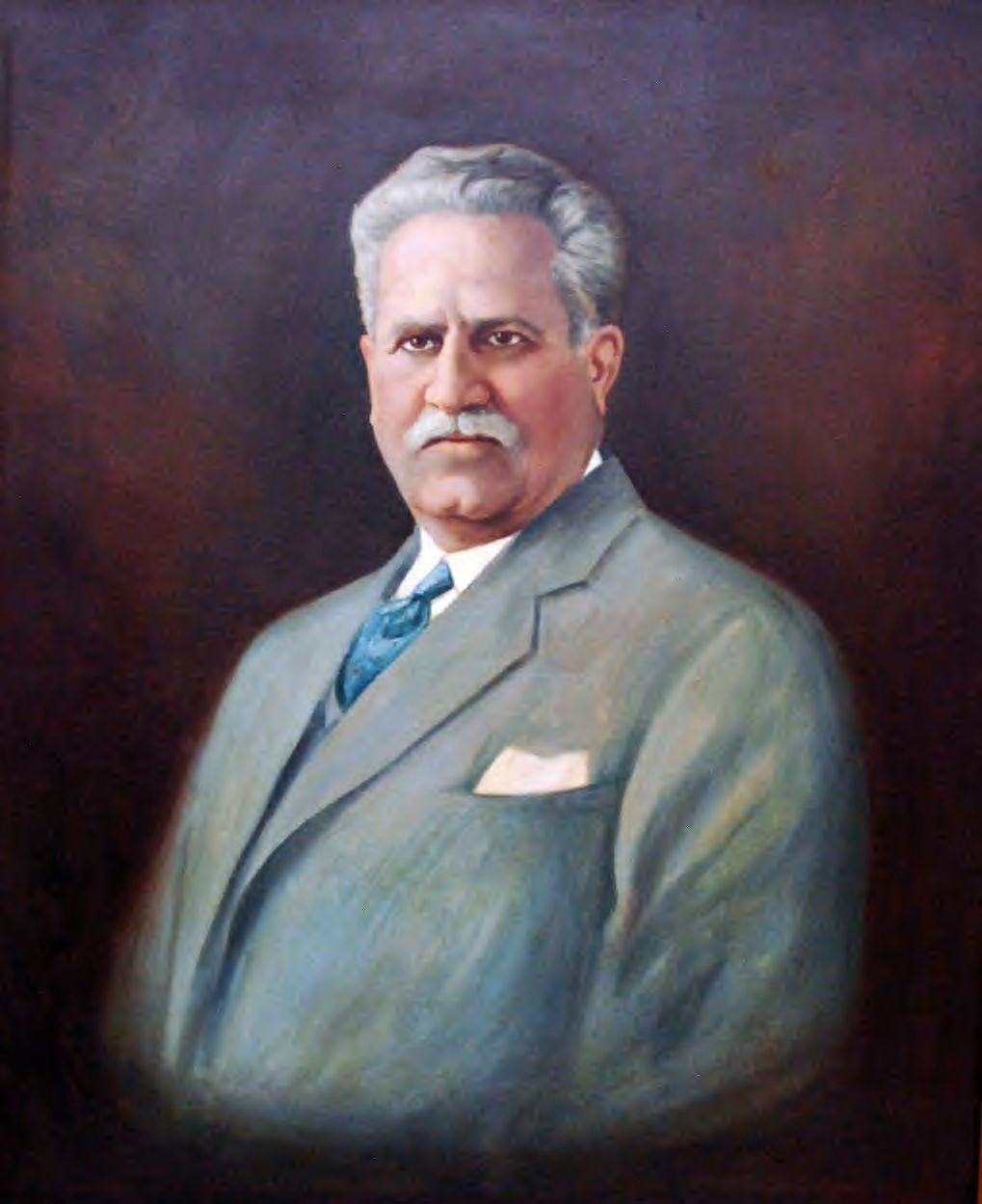

1st President of the Senate of Puerto Rico
- In office 1917–1929
- Succeeded by: Luis Sánchez Morales

Member of the Senate of Puerto Rico from the Humacao district
- In office 1917–1920

Member of the Senate of Puerto Rico from the at-large district
- In office 1921–1938

Minority Leader of the Puerto Rico Senate
- In office 1932–1936

Personal details
- Born: Antonio Rafael Barceló y Martínez; April 15, 1868 Fajardo, Puerto Rico
- Died: December 15, 1938 (aged 70) San Juan, Puerto Rico
- Resting place: Santa María Magdalena de Pazzis Cemetery
- Party: Union of Puerto Rico; Alianza Puertorriqueña; Liberal Party of Puerto Rico
- Spouse: Josefina Bird Arias
- Children: Antonio; Josefina; Jaime; María Angélica
- Education: Columbia Law School (JD)

Antonio Rafael Barceló y Martínez (April 15, 1868 – December 15, 1938) was a Puerto Rican lawyer, businessman and the patriarch of what was to become one of Puerto Rico's most prominent political families. Barceló, who in 1917 became the first President of the Senate of Puerto Rico, played an instrumental role in the introduction and passage of legislation which permitted the realization of the School of Tropical Medicine and the construction of a Capitol building in Puerto Rico.

== Early years ==
Barceló was born in the City of Fajardo, Puerto Rico, to Jaime José Barceló Miralles (son of Antonio and Catalina) and Josefa Martínez de León (b. 1842). His father Jaime had emigrated from Palma, Majorca, Balearic Islands, Spain to Puerto Rico where he married Josefa (b. Naguabo, Puerto Rico) in Fajardo. He became an orphan by the age of three; his father had died in 1870 and his mother in 1871. He went to live with his aunt, Carmela de Leon, and his grandmother Belen de Leon, both of whom raised him. As a youngster, Barceló took an active interest in politics.

He studied in the "Concillier Seminary" of San Juan. In 1928 he earned a Juris Doctor from Columbia Law School. He joined the "Autonomist Party" (founded by José de Diego and Román Baldorioty de Castro in 1887) and soon became the party's secretary. In 1897, he was appointed as a municipal judge of Fajardo. The United States allowed him to retain the position after its invasion during the Spanish–American War. On February 4, 1899, Barceló married Maria Georgina "Josefina" Bird Arias, a daughter of the sugar baron Jorge Bird León.

== Political career ==
=== Union Party of Puerto Rico ===
Barceló left the Autonomist Party and together with Luis Muñoz Rivera, Rosendo Matienzo Cintrón, Eduardo Georgetti, Juan Vias Ochoteco, José de Diego, and others, founded the "Union party". The party, which believed in Puerto Rican independence, was led by Muñoz Rivera as president, with Barceló as the secretary general. The party won the election in 1904 and Muñoz Rivera was selected as a member of the House of Delegates, while Barceló was elected to the Chamber of Delegates in 1905.

In 1910, Barceló founded the Association of Puerto Rico, with the idea of protecting the main industries of the island, which at that time were coffee, tobacco and sugar, against imported brands. The legislature of Puerto Rico passed law number 52 in 1913, which officially established the Association of Puerto Rico and renamed it the Association of Products made in Puerto Rico. The law also incorporated and protected the official logo of the association, which contains the phrase Hecho en Puerto Rico (Made in Puerto Rico).

In 1914, Barceló, Muñoz Rivera and de Diego were members of an executive council that tried to form an alliance between the Union and Republican Parties. In 1917, after Luis Muñoz Rivera died, Barceló became the leading force behind the liberal ideas of the island. He looked after Luis Muñoz Marín, Muñoz Rivera's son, and continued the publication of La Democracia, the political newspaper founded by Muñoz Rivera.

From 1917 to 1932, he was elected to the Senate of Puerto Rico, and was named president of the Puerto Rican Senate. Barceló opposed the Jones-Shafroth Act, which granted United States citizenship to residents of Puerto Rico, because he thought it might interfere with gaining independence. Also, the judicial and executive branches would still be controlled by the United States. The Jones-Shafroth Act was approved by the United States and signed into law by President Woodrow Wilson on March 2, 1917. The Union Party under Barceló's leadership resolved to adopt a different stance and to seek more autonomy, which he believed would finally lead to independence. This shift prompted de Diego, who was a strong independence advocate, to depart from the party.

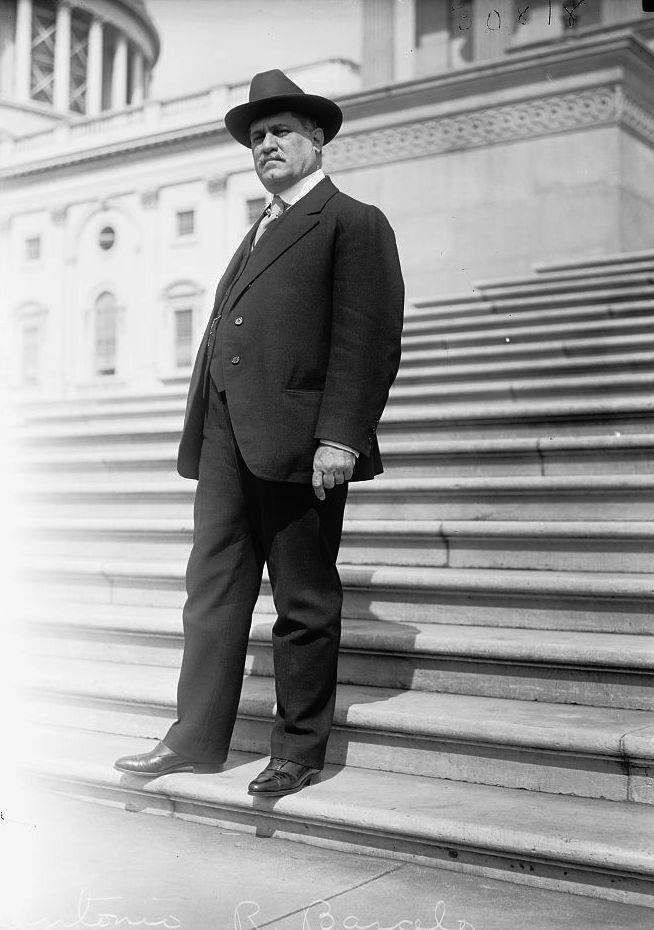
Antonio R. Barceló

In 1921, President Warren G. Harding appointed Emmet Montgomery Reily, who was a strong supporter of "Americanism", as Governor of Puerto Rico. During his inauguration address, he insisted that the United States flag ("Old Glory") should be the only flag used over the island and denounced those who believed in Puerto Rican independence as anti-American and traitors. Additionally, he placed several mainland politicians in prominent positions in the Puerto Rican government. Reily was an extremely unpopular governor, he was the subject of corruption allegations and an investigation by Puerto Rican local officials. Under pressure, Reily resigned as governor in 1923.

As Reily had convinced the American public that the independence advocates were enemies of the U.S., Barceló and his party opted for the creation of El Estado Libre Asociado (a Free Associated State), asking for more autonomy in Puerto Rico instead of independence. He received the support of U.S. Representative Phillip Campbell, who introduced a bill to the United States Congress to such respect. It also included provisions for Puerto Ricans to elect their own governor. The Campbell Bill did not pass Congress, however. This led to the departure of José Coll y Cuchí from the party and his founding of the Puerto Rican Nationalist Party.

As president of the Senate, Barceló supported legislation to give Governor Horace Towner and his cabinet, the economic resources to create the School of Tropical Medicine, the Capitol building, the state penitentiary and healthy quarters for workers (said quarters became known as "Barrio Obrero"). He played an instrumental role in what resulted in the construction of buildings for the University of Puerto Rico and the development of an excellent native faculty.

In 1922, presiding Chief Justice of the United States, William Howard Taft made the following statement in regard to the :"Balzac v. Porto Rico" case: "Puerto Rico belongs to the United States, but is not part of the United States. Puerto Rico is an unincorporated territory and even though Puerto Ricans have American citizenship, they do not have the same rights as the common American citizen".

Both Barceló and Jose Tous Soto, the president of the pro-statehood Republican Party of Puerto Rico, understood by Taft's statement that neither independence nor statehood would be considered for the time being. In 1924, they formed an "Alliance" between their political parties to concentrate on improving Puerto Rico's economic situation. The party was called Alianza Puertorriqueña (or Puerto Rican Alliance). All this led to some differences in ideals between Eduardo Georgetti and Barceló. Georgetti believed in the original ideal of the Union Party and that the "Alliance" coalition would not work because of their ideological differences. Barceló and a group of party delegates traveled to Washington to seek changes in the Jones Act of 1917, by presenting their views that the economic situation in Puerto Rico was a good one and that Puerto Ricans were capable of electing their own governor. Georgetti traveled to Washington, D.C., in representation of various Puerto Rican organizations, among them the Agriculturist Association and the Association of Sugar Producers. The group which he represented became known by the press as the Fuerzas Vivas (Live Forces). Georgetti and the "Fuerzas Vivas" presented the Secretary of War a "Memorandum" which presented the economic situation of the island in the brink of ruins. His actions were viewed by Barceló and the "Alliance" as an attempt by Georgetti and the "Fuerzas Vivas" to discredit him and weaken the "Alliance". Georgetti denied it and quit the alliance. Barceló was also a victim of an assassination attempt, but this did not keep him from believing and pursuing his liberal ideas.

=== Liberal Party of Puerto Rico ===
Differences became apparent between Barceló and Tous Soto and Félix Córdova Dávila, the Resident Commissioner of Puerto Rico in Washington, as to the goals of the alliance. Barceló requested that Herbert Hoover, the newly elected President of the United States, retain Horace Towner temporarily as governor of the island. Hoover, however, consulted Córdova Dávila, instead of Barceló, in regard to his intentions of naming Theodore Roosevelt Jr. to the position. Córdova Dávila in turn notified Tous Soto, instead of Barceló, as to Hoover's decision.

Barceló felt offended that he was not consulted and convinced his followers, in the Unionist sector of the alliance, to disaffiliate themselves from the "Alliance." Because of legal reasons Barceló was unable to use the name "Union Party." In 1932, he founded the "Puerto Rican Liberal Party." The Liberal Party's political agenda was the same as that of the original Union Party, urging independence as a final political solution for Puerto Rico. Among those who joined him in the "new" party were Felisa Rincón de Gautier and Ernesto Ramos Antonini. By 1932, Barceló had invited Luis Muñoz Marín, son of Luis Muñoz Rivera, to join the Liberal Party. During the elections of 1932, the Liberal Party faced the Alliance, by then a coalition of the Republican Party of Puerto Rico and Santiago Iglesias Pantin's Socialist Party.

Barceló and Muñoz Marín were both elected senators of Puerto Rico. Even though the Liberal Party received more votes than the Republican Party and the Socialist Party did individually, it received fewer votes than their candidates as a coalition. Eventually, Muñoz Marín, who had different points of view as to how Puerto Rico should go about obtaining its independence, would collide with Barceló. Barceló believed that independence should be a gradual process, preceded by autonomous insular government.

Following the Río Piedras massacre in 1935, US Senator Millard Tydings in 1936 introduced a bill in Congress for Puerto Rican independence. The Puerto Rican parties supported the bill, but Muñoz Marín opposed it, saying it had unfavorable economic aspects. Tydings did not gain passage of the bill.

In 1936, a Liberal Party assembly was held in San Juan. Muñoz Marín said he was not interested in being considered for the position of Resident Commissioner and recommended Barceló. This move would leave the presidency of the party open for Muñoz Marín. Barceló refused to be named commissioner and to relinquish his presidency. Muñoz Marín and his followers founded a group within the party called "Accion Social Puertorriqueño" (Puerto Rican Social Action), who believed in gaining the immediate independence of Puerto Rico.

After the Liberal Party was defeated in 1936 elections, its leaders held an assembly in Naranjales on May 31, 1937. Muñoz Marín presented his ideas as to how the party should be run. The majority of the party members objected and blamed him for their defeat, as well as criticizing his opposition of the bill for independence. Muñoz Marín considered this action the same as having been expelled from the party.

Muñoz Marín and his followers, held an assembly in the town of Arecibo and founded the Partido Liberal, Neto, Auténtico y Completo ("Clear, Authentic and Complete Liberal Party"), claiming to be the true Liberal Party. The Partido Liberal, Neto, Auténtico y Completo, an independence political party, later became the Popular Democratic Party (PPD). It promoted the political status of an Estado Libre Associado (Free Associated State) status which Barceló, as president of the Union Party, had asked for in 1923. Muñoz Marín had formerly opposed this.

== Later years ==
Antonio R. Barceló died in San Juan, Puerto Rico, on October 15, 1938. With his passing, his daughter Maria Antonia Josefina, was elected president of the Liberal Party, thus becoming the first woman to preside a political party in Puerto Rico. The party ceased to exist in 1948. Ironically, his grandson Carlos Romero Barceló (Maria Antonia Josefina's son) on January 2, 1977, was sworn in as Governor of Puerto Rico with a pro-statehood agenda, a political status which Antonio R. Barceló had opposed, as member of the Partido Nuevo Progresista de Puerto Rico (New Progressive Party of Puerto Rico).

== Legacy ==
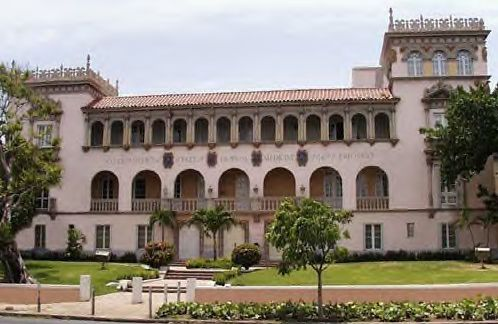
The School of Tropical Medicine

Barceló was responsible for the approval of many laws which led to reforms and that would greatly benefit the social justice, labor and the Puerto Rican economy. Barceló helped to establish the minimum wage rate, workers' compensation and limited working hours. Barceló, also played a principal role in the establishment of "The School of Tropical Medicine", "The Federal Penitentiary", "The Antituberculosis Sanctuary" and numerous other centers. He introduced the proper legislation which permitted the construction of the Puerto Rico State Capitol. During his tenure as president of the Puerto Rico Senate. In 1928, Columbia University of New York, honored Barceló by bestowing upon him an Honorary Doctorate of Law.

His memory has been honored by Puerto Rico by naming public buildings and schools after him, including the Antonio R. Barceló Legislative Building which previously housed the School of Tropical Medicine and the Department of Natural Resources. His philosophy remains relevant nearly a century later, as evidenced by references to it in contemporary political and journalistic commentary.

== See also ==
- List of Puerto Ricans
- Senate of Puerto Rico

Political offices
Preceded by None	President of the Senate of Puerto Rico; 1917–1929	Succeeded by Luis Sánchez Morales
