= Luis Sánchez Morales =

Puerto Rican politician

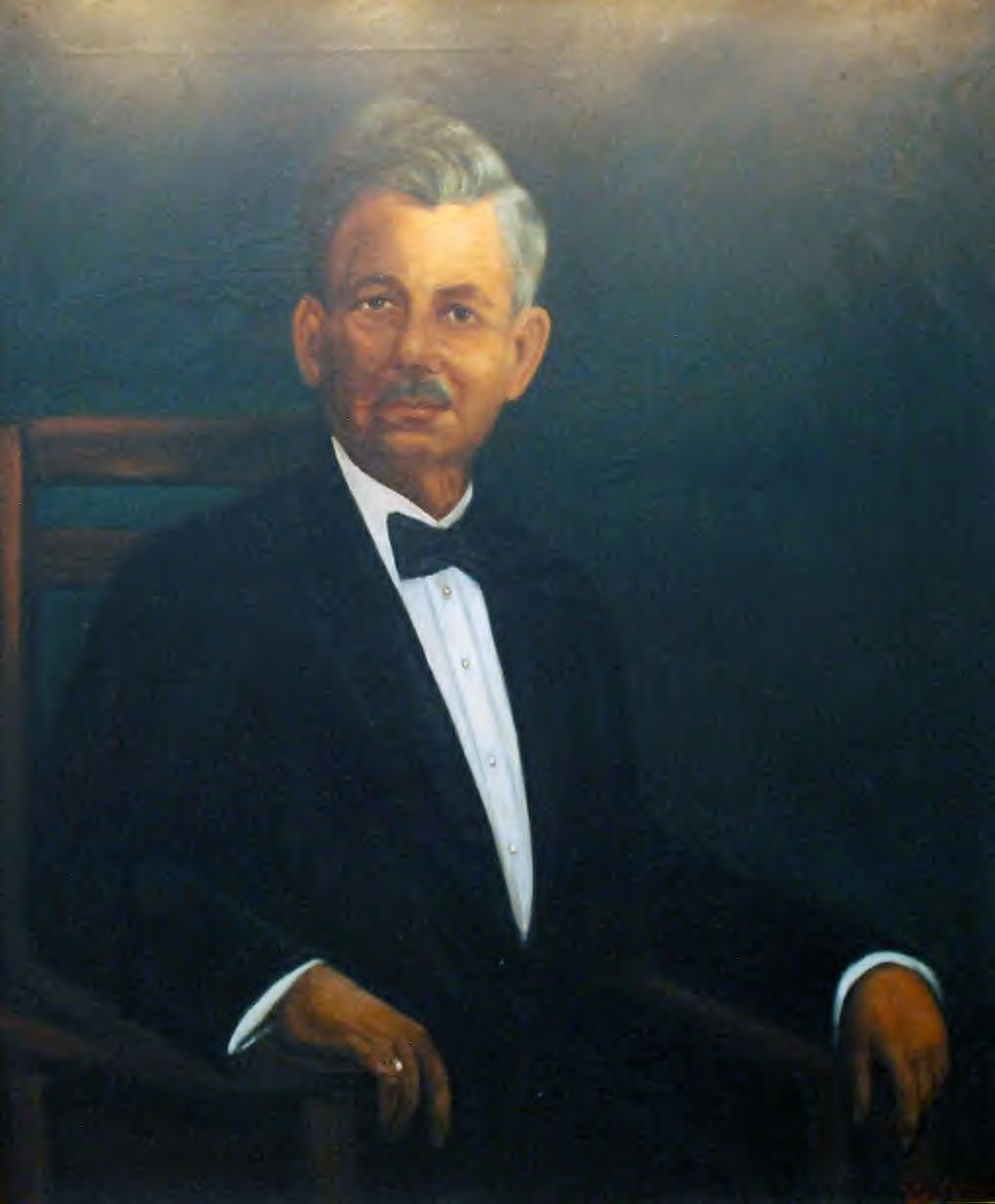

2nd President of the Senate of Puerto Rico
- In office 1929–1933
- Preceded by: Antonio R. Barceló
- Succeeded by: Rafael Martínez Nadal

President pro tempore of the Senate of Puerto Rico
- In office 1924–1929
- Preceded by: Juan Hernández López
- Succeeded by: Celestino Iriarte Miró

Member of the Senate of Puerto Rico from the San Juan district
- In office 1924–1933

Personal details
- Born: Luis Sánchez Morales; November 27, 1867 San Juan, Puerto Rico
- Died: March 27, 1934 (aged 66) San Juan, Puerto Rico
- Party: Republican Party of Puerto Rico

Senator Luis Sánchez Morales (November 27, 1867 – March 27, 1934) was a Puerto Rican politician who served as the second President of the Senate of Puerto Rico from 1930 to 1932.

== Biography ==
Sanchez was born on November 27, 1867, in San Juan, to Manuel Sánchez Apellaniz (1847-1884) and his mother Ana Morales Seijo (1853-1915). He had two younger brothers, Manuel (1872-1924) and Francisco (1879-1948). He studied in Ciales and in San Juan, Puerto Rico.

In 1884, with his father, he founded a commercial enterprise. In addition to running the family business, he delved into literature, writing for newspapers and magazines during the latter part of the 19th century, before becoming involved in politics.

He represented the Puerto Rican Republican Party, founded by Dr. José Celso Barbosa in 1899, in Washington during the discussions leading to the approval of Puerto Rico's first Organic Act, known as the Foraker Act of 1900.

President Theodore Roosevelt appointed him as member of the United States territory's "Executive Committee", appointive precursor of the elective Senate of Puerto Rico, in 1904, which he then chaired from 1912 to 1917, when the committee was abolished by the Jones Act and replaced by the Senate.

During his early years in public service, he continued devoted to his business interests, served as a director of a commercial bank, a trustee of the University of Puerto Rico and president of the San Juan Chamber of Commerce and the YMCA.

He died in Río Grande on March 27, 1934, at the age of 66. Was buried at the Santa María Magdalena de Pazzis Cemetery in San Juan, Puerto Rico.

== Senate service ==
In the 1924 general elections, he was elected as a candidate of the Puerto Rico Alliance Party to the Senate, representing the district of San Juan, and was reelected in 1928. After the death of the Senate's first president, Antonio R. Barceló, he was elected as its second president on February 20, 1930, serving until the end of that term in 1932.

Political offices
Preceded by Antonio R. Barceló	President of the Senate of Puerto Rico; 1929–33	Succeeded by Rafael Martínez Nadal
Preceded by Juan Hernández López	President pro tempore of the Senate of Puerto Rico; 1924–29	Succeeded by Celestino Iriarte Miró
Preceded by Francisco Del Valle Atiles	Mayor of San Juan; 1899	Succeeded by R.M. Blanchford
