= Juan Cancel Ríos =

Puerto Rican politician

The Honorable Juan Cancel Ríos
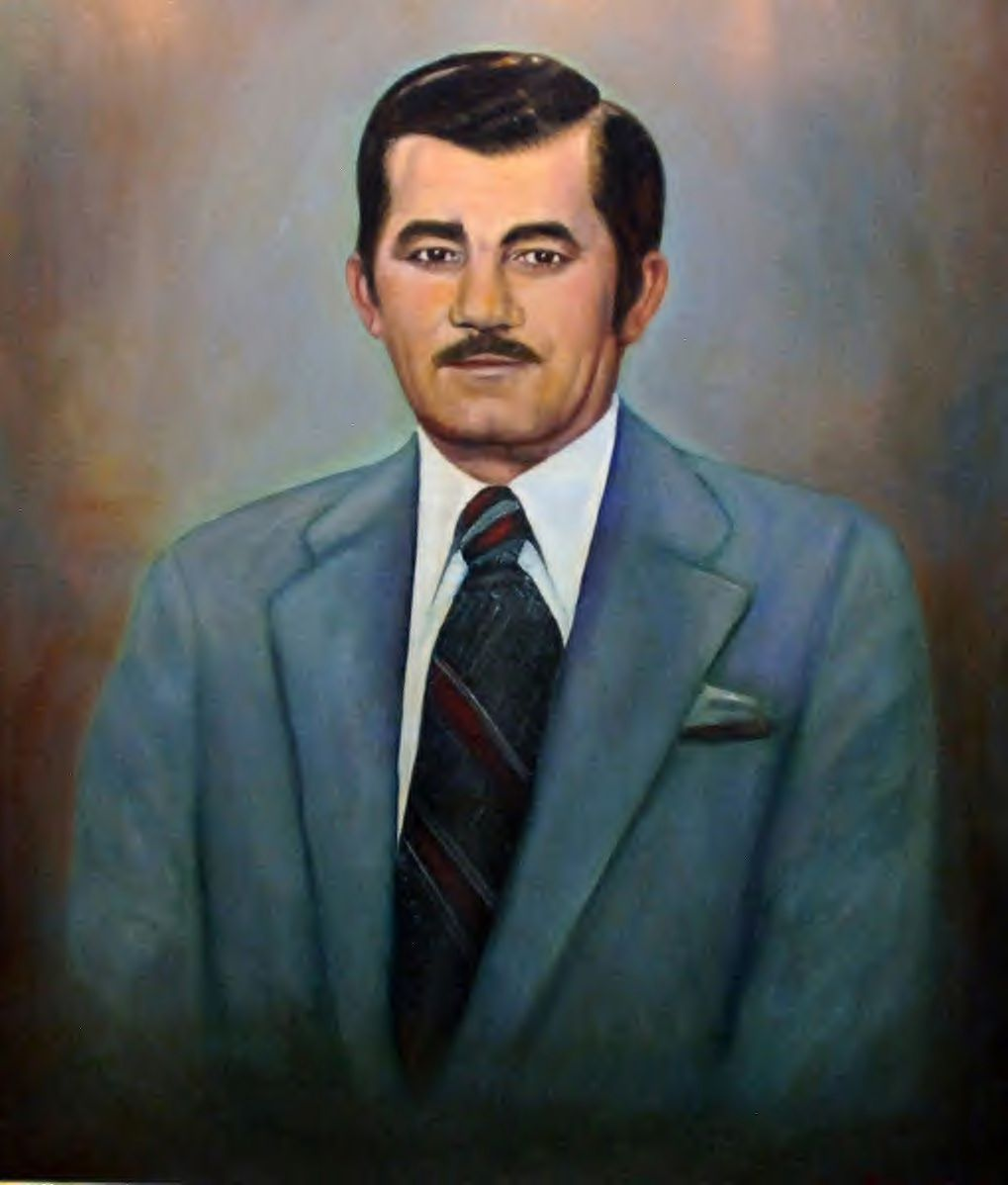

Member of the Puerto Rico Senate from the Arecibo district
- In office 1964–1976

7th President of the Senate of Puerto Rico
- In office 1973–1976
- Preceded by: Rafael Hernández Colón
- Succeeded by: Luis A. Ferré

Member of the Puerto Rico House of Representatives from the 12th District
- In office 1961–1964

President pro tempore of the Senate of Puerto Rico
- In office 1969–1972
- Preceded by: Luis Negrón López
- Succeeded by: Miguel Hernández Agosto

President of the Municipal Assembly of Barceloneta, Puerto Rico
- In office 1957–1960

Personal details
- Born: Juan José Cancel Ríos; August 20, 1925 Barceloneta, Puerto Rico
- Died: August 26, 1992 (aged 67) San Juan, Puerto Rico
- Resting place: Barceloneta Old Cemetery
- Party: Popular Democratic Party
- Spouse: Carmen Leticia Alegría Estela
- Children: Carmencita; María Magdalena; Juan Andrés
- Education: University of Puerto Rico (BA) University of Puerto Rico School of Law (JD)
- Profession: Politician, Attorney

Military service
- Allegiance: United States of America
- Branch/service: United States Army
- Years of service: 1945–1947

Juan José Cancel Ríos (August 20, 1925 – August 26, 1992) was a Puerto Rican politician and lawyer who served as the 7th President of the Senate of Puerto Rico from 1973 to 1976.

== Biography ==
Juan Cancel Ríos was born on August 20, 1925, in Barceloneta, Puerto Rico. His parents were Juan Cancel Matos and Salustiana Ríos. Cancel Ríos studied his elementary at Rafael Balseiro Maceira Elementary School in Barceloneta, graduating in 1940. He then went to José Severo Quiñonez High School in Manatí, graduating in 1944. He then went to study at the University of Puerto Rico, but after his first year, he enlisted in the United States Army to serve during World War II. In 1947, he was honorably discharged by the Army and he returned to the University, graduating in 1953 with two degrees: Social Science and Law at the University of Puerto Rico School of Law . After passing the bar exam, he became an attorney.

Cancel showed interest in politics since his youth. From 1957 to 1960, he presided the Municipal Assembly of Barceloneta. In 1960, he was elected as a member of the Puerto Rico House of Representatives for the District of Manatí-Barceloneta. He served in that position from 1961 to 1964.

In 1964, Cancel was elected to the Senate of Puerto Rico for the District of Arecibo. He was reelected in 1968 and 1972. In 1973, his fellow senators chose him as President of the Senate. He did so until 1976.

Cancel was also a member of the Board of the Attorney's College, the Lions Club of Manatí, the American Legion, and other civic organizations. After retiring from politics, Cancel presided the Puerto Rico Baseball League.

Cancel Ríos was married to Carmen Leticia Alegría Estela, and they had three children together: Carmencita, María Magdalena and Juan Andrés. Cancel Ríos died on August 26, 1992, in San Juan, Puerto Rico. He was buried at Barceloneta Old Cemetery in Barceloneta, Puerto Rico.

== Legacy ==
The Barceloneta Government Center is named after him.

In 2023 Juan Cancel Ríos was posthumously inducted to the Puerto Rico Veterans Hall of Fame.

== See also ==
- List of Puerto Ricans
- Senate of Puerto Rico

Political offices
Preceded by Rafael Hernández Colón	President of the Senate of Puerto Rico; 1973–76	Succeeded by Luis A. Ferré
Senate of Puerto Rico
Preceded by Luis Negrón López	President pro tempore of the Senate of Puerto Rico; 1969–72	Succeeded by Miguel Hernández Agosto
