= Republican Union (Puerto Rico) =

Political party in Puerto Rico

Republican Union Logo

The Republican Union (Spanish: Unión Republicana) was a pro-statehood political party in Puerto Rico, that also contemplated total autonomy in the case that U.S. statehood was denied. Its president was Rafael Martínez Nadal. It existed from 1932 to 1940. Together with the Socialist Party, it was part of an electoral alliance known as Coalition.

== Founding ==
The party formed early in 1932 from the union of Partido Republicano Puro and Partido Alianza Puertorriqueña, after the dissolution of Partido Alianza Puertorriqueña and the reconciliation between the Republicanos Puro and the Republicanos who had left Partido Republicano in 1928. However, before the 1932 elections, Partido Unión Republicana joined forces with the Socialist Party to form the Coalition. The pact between these two parties (Unión Republicana and Socialista) was renewed before the 1936 elections to continue in force during that electoral cycle.

In 1940 the party reconstituted itself as Partido Unión Republicana Progresista, with Celestino Iriarte as its president. Later on yet, in 1948, Partido Unión Republicana re-branded itself as Partido Estadista Puertorriqueño.
