= Luis Muñoz Marín =

First elected governor of Puerto Rico (1949–1965)

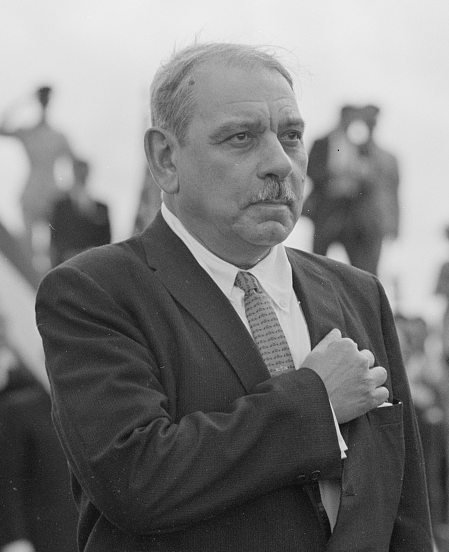
- Muñoz Marín in 1960

Governor of Puerto Rico
- In office January 2, 1949 – January 2, 1965
- Preceded by: Jesús T. Piñero (appointed)
- Succeeded by: Roberto Sánchez Vilella

President of the Puerto Rico Senate
- In office January 2, 1941 – January 2, 1949
- Preceded by: Rafael Martínez Nadal
- Succeeded by: Samuel R. Quiñones

Member of the Puerto Rico Senate from the at-large district
- In office January 2, 1941 – January 2, 1949
- In office January 2, 1965 – August, 1970

Personal details
- Born: José Luis Alberto Muñoz Marín; February 18, 1898 Old San Juan, Puerto Rico
- Died: April 30, 1980 (aged 82) San Juan, Puerto Rico
- Resting place: Muñoz Rivera Family Mausoleum
- Party: Popular Democratic
- Spouse(s): Muna Lee (1919–1938); Inés Mendoza (1946–1980)
- Children: 4, including Victoria
- Education: Georgetown University (attened)

José Luis Alberto Muñoz Marín (February 18, 1898 – April 30, 1980), most commonly known as Luis Muñoz Marín, (Spanish pronunciation: [ˈlwis muˈɲos maˈɾin]) was a Puerto Rican journalist, politician, and statesman who served as the first democratically elected governor of Puerto Rico from 1949 to 1965. He previously served as the fourth president of the Senate of Puerto Rico from 1941 to 1948.

Founder of the Popular Democratic Party (PPD) in 1938, Muñoz Marín promoted the industrialization of the archipelago and island in continued association with the United States, prioritizing economic development over independence. He is regarded as the architect of the Commonwealth of Puerto Rico (Spanish: Estado Libre Asociado de Puerto Rico, lit. 'Free Associated State of Puerto Rico'), the current political status of Puerto Rico as an unincorporated territory under the sovereign jurisdiction of the United States with local constitutional self-government since 1952.

Serving as governor for 16 consecutive years from 1949 to 1965, Muñoz Marín spearheaded an administration that engineered profound economic, political, and social reforms, leading to accomplishments that were internationally lauded by many politicians, statesmen, political scientists, and economists of the period. He was instrumental in the suppression of the Nationalist Party and its efforts to achieve the independence of Puerto Rico as a sovereign state, which he supported before adopting a political platform that advocated accommodation with the United States. He was awarded the Presidential Medal of Freedom by President Kennedy in 1963.

== Early life and education ==
=== Childhood ===
Luis Muñoz Marín was born on February 18, 1898, at 152 Calle de la Fortaleza in Old San Juan. He was the son of Luis Muñoz Rivera and Amalia Marín Castilla. His father was a poet, publisher, and a politician, responsible for founding two newspapers, El Diario and La Democracia. Days before Luis' birth, his father traveled to Spain to present a proposal of autonomy for Puerto Rico, which was accepted. His father was elected to serve as Secretary of State of Puerto Rico and Chief of the Cabinet for the Government of Puerto Rico.

On October 18, 1898, Puerto Rico was taken by the United States following Spain's defeat in the Spanish–American War. Luis's father assisted in establishing an insular police force, but opposed the military colonial government established by the United States. He resigned from office on February 4, 1899, but was later elected to the House of Delegates of Puerto Rico.

One of Muñoz Marín's paternal great-grandfathers, Luis Muñoz Iglesias, was born on October 12, 1797, in Palencia, Spain. At age 14, he had joined the Spanish Army and battled Napoleon Bonaparte's French Army in the Peninsular War. Afterward he decided to make his career in the army, and was awarded decorations after fighting against Simón Bolívar during the Admirable Campaign of independence in Latin America. Once the conflict was over, he traveled to Puerto Rico along with his commanding officer, Miguel de la Torre. He subsequently settled in a farm in Cidra and married María Escolástica Barrios. One of his great-grandmothers was Rosa Solá, a woman held in slavery by his great grandfather, Vicente Marín.

In 1901, when Muñoz Marín was three years old, a group of statehood supporters broke into his father's El Diario's building and vandalized most of the equipment. Following this incident, the family moved to Caguas. After receiving further threats from the statehood movements, the family moved to New York City. There Muñoz Marín learned English, while his father founded the bilingual newspaper, Puerto Rico Herald. During the following years, the family frequently traveled between both locations. His father founded the Unionist Party in Puerto Rico, which won the election in 1904. Following the party's victory, his father was elected as a member of the House of Delegates.

Muñoz Marín began his elementary education at William Penn Public School in Santurce, a district of San Juan. Most classes were taught in English, a change imposed by the American colonial government. Muñoz Marín's knowledge of English allowed him to be advanced to second grade, although he had some difficulty the next year. In 1908, Muñoz Marín was enrolled in a small private school in San Juan. Working with the teacher Pedro Moczó, in two years he covered all the material normally taught to students between third and eighth grade, passing tests with good grades.

In 1910, his father was elected as Resident Commissioner of Puerto Rico. This position is a non-voting delegate to the United States Congress.

In 1911, he began his studies at the Georgetown Preparatory School but disliked its strict discipline and failed the tenth grade. In 1915, his father enrolled him at Georgetown University Law Center, but Muñoz Marín was uninterested and wanted to become a poet.

In late 1916, Muñoz Marín and his mother were called to Puerto Rico by their friend Eduardo Georgetti, who said Luis' father was suffering from an infection spreading from his gallbladder. Muñoz Rivera died on November 15, 1916, when Luis was eighteen.

=== Poetry and ideological contrasts ===
A month later Muñoz Marín and his mother returned to New York; he sold his law books and refused to return to Georgetown. Within one month he published a book titled Borrones, composed of several stories and a one-act play. For several months, he served as the congressional clerk to Félix Córdova Dávila, who succeeded Muñoz Marín's father as Resident Commissioner.

== Marriage and family ==
On July 1, 1919, Muñoz Marín married Muna Lee, an American writer from Raymond, Mississippi, who had grown up in Oklahoma. Lee was a leading Southern feminist and a rising writer of Pan-American poetry. They had a daughter and a son together, but often lived apart before separating in 1938.

During the 1920s Muñoz Marín spent the majority of his time in Greenwich Village, where he lived apart from his wife and young children. During those years he often asked his wife and mother to send him money, and indulged in a "Bohemian lifestyle" that strained his marriage. Muñoz Marín and his wife Muna Lee underwent a legal separation in 1938.

During his first campaign for the Puerto Rico Senate in 1932, Muñoz Marín was accused of being a narcotics addict; he was alleged to be addicted to opium.

Before his campaigns of 1938 and 1939, while he was still legally married, Muñoz Marín met Inés Mendoza. A teacher, she became his mistress and was fired for complaining about the prohibition against classes in Spanish. They agreed that substituting "one language for another is to diminish that country's capacity to be happy". Muñoz Marín asked Mendoza to "stay with him all his life."

In 1940, a month after his election as President of the Senate in Puerto Rico, Muñoz Marín and Mendoza had a daughter, Victoria, named to commemorate his success. He and Mendoza officially married in 1946, and they had a second daughter, Viviana.

In the 1980s, their daughter Victoria Muñoz Mendoza became active in Puerto Rican politics. In 1992, she became the first woman to run as a candidate for the governorship of Puerto Rico.

== Formation of political ideas ==
In 1920, Muñoz Marín was selected to deliver a check to Santiago Iglesias, the president of the Socialist Party of Puerto Rico. Excited about the prospect of meeting him, they moved to Puerto Rico, where the couple's first daughter, Munita, was born. Upon arriving, he noticed that some of the landowners were paying the jíbaros, the mountain-dwelling peasants of Puerto Rico, two dollars in exchange for their votes. He joined the Socialist Party, a decision regarded as a "disaster" by his family. In October 1920, the Socialist Party recruited members of the Republican Party in order to win upcoming elections. Disappointed, Muñoz Marín returned to the mainland, moving to New Jersey with his family. Shortly after, his first son, Luis Muñoz Lee, was born.

In 1923, he returned alone to Puerto Rico, supposedly to publish a book that collected several of his father's previously unpublished works. After collecting $5,000 from his father's friends for this alleged "publication" Muñoz Marín spent the money, did not write the book, and quickly left the island. Several years later, after things had quieted down, Antonio R. Barceló, who was the president of the newly formed Liberal Party, called Muñoz Marín to work on La Democracia. After having problems with some members of the party's Republican faction, due to his support for island autonomy, Muñoz Marín returned to New York. Here he wrote for The American Mercury and The Nation.

In 1931, after traveling throughout the United States, Muñoz Marín noticed the instability of the country's economy — and his own personal finances — after the stock market crash.He borrowed money from a group of friends and returned to the island. Upon arriving, he discovered that Hurricane San Felipe Segundo had destroyed most of the sugar crops where the jíbaros worked, leaving the majority unemployed.

== Political career ==
=== Senator ===
By the 1930s, Puerto Rico's political scenario had changed; the only party actively asking for independence was the Puerto Rican Nationalist Party. That organization's president, Pedro Albizu Campos, occasionally met with Muñoz Marín. He was impressed by the substance of Albizu's arguments, but their styles to achieve autonomy and social reforms were different.

In 1932, Antonio R. Barceló abandoned the Coalition, which by this time had weakened, and he worked to establish a new independence movement. Barceló adopted several of Muñoz Marín's ideas of social and economic reforms and autonomy, using them to form the ideology of the Liberal Party of Puerto Rico. Muñoz Marín joined the Liberal Party and led La Democracia, which had become the party's official newspaper. He had decided to become a politician to achieve reform. In speeches, he discussed ways to provide more land, hospitals, food and schools to the general public.

On March 13, 1932, Muñoz Marín was nominated by the party for the post of senator. Although the party did not win a majority in the 1932 elections, Muñoz Marín received enough votes to gain a position in the Puerto Rican Senate. Shortly after, Rudy Black, a reporter for La Democracia, arranged a meeting between him and Eleanor Roosevelt. Wanting her to see Puerto Rico's problems personally, he persuaded her to visit the main island.

In August 1932, Muñoz Marín received Eleanor Roosevelt in Fort San Felipe del Morro and La Fortaleza before traveling to El Fanguito, a poor sector that had suffered much damage in the hurricane. When photos of her visit were published, former American governors and the incumbent were outraged to have been overlooked. Following his wife's report, Franklin D. Roosevelt included Puerto Rico in the New Deal program. Muñoz Marín became a popular political figure due to his involvement in the program, which provided for considerable investment of federal funds in Puerto Rico to develop infrastructure and housing.

Following the government police massacre of Nationalist protesters at the University of Puerto Rico in Río Piedras in 1935 (the Río Piedras massacre) and again at Ponce in 1937, the US Senator Millard Tydings from Maryland supported a bill in 1936 to give independence to Puerto Rico. (He had co-sponsored the Tydings–McDuffie Act, which provided independence to the Philippines after a 10-year transition under a limited autonomy.) All the Puerto Rican parties supported the bill, but Muñoz Marín opposed it. Tydings did not gain passage of the bill.

Muñoz Marín criticized the bill for what he said would be adverse effects on the island's economy. He compared it to a principle known as Ley de Fuga (Law of flight). This was the term for a police officer arresting a man, releasing him, and shooting him in the back while the policeman retreated, claiming the suspect had "fled."

As a result of his opposition to the bill and disagreement with Antonio R. Barceló, Muñoz Marín was expelled from the Liberal Party. Muñoz Marín's expulsion severely affected his public image.

He created a group named Acción Social Independentista (ASI) ("Pro-Independence Social Action") which later became the Partido Liberal Neto, Auténtico y Completo. This organization served as opposition to the Liberal Party, which was led by Barceló.

Along with many liberal democratic administrators from the New Deal relief organization known as the Puerto Rico Reconstruction Administration (PRRA), in 1938, Muñoz Marín helped create the Popular Democratic Party of Puerto Rico (Partido Popular Democratico, or PPD). The party committed to helping the jíbaros, regardless of their political beliefs, by promoting a minimum wage, initiatives to provide food and water, cooperatives to work with agriculture, and the creation of more industrial alternatives. Muñoz Marín concentrated his political campaigning in the rural areas of Puerto Rico. He attacked the then common practice of paying off rural farm workers to influence their vote, insisting that they "lend" their vote for only one election. The party's first rally attracted solid participation, which surprised the other parties.

=== President of the Senate ===
External audio
- You may listen to one of the speeches made in Spanish by Luis Muñoz Marín on YouTube

In 1940, the Popular Democratic Party won a majority in the Senate of Puerto Rico, which was attributed to his campaigning in the rural areas, he first gave a speech in Dorado, Puerto Rico in the balcony of a house owned by electrician Luis Pérez Álvarez, in 1947. Muñoz Marín was elected as the fourth President of the Senate.

During his term as President of the Senate, Muñoz was an advocate of the working class of Puerto Rico. Along with Governor Rexford Tugwell, the last non-Puerto Rican US-appointed Governor, and the republican-socialist coalition which headed the House of Representatives, Muñoz helped advance legislation for agricultural reform, economic recovery, and industrialization. This program became known as Operation Bootstrap. It was coupled with a program of agrarian reform (land redistribution) which limited the area to be held by large sugarcane interests. During the first four decades of the 20th century, Puerto Rico's dominant economic commodity had been sugarcane by-products.

Operation Bootstrap encouraged investors to transfer or create manufacturing plants, offering them local and federal tax concessions, while maintaining access to American markets free of import duties. The program facilitated a shift to an industrial economy. During the 1950s, labor-intensive light industries were developed on the island, such as textiles; manufacturing later gave way to heavy industry, such as petrochemicals and oil refining, in the 1960s and 1970s. Taught in Spanish, jíbaros were trained to work in jobs being promoted by the government. Muñoz Marín backed legislation to limit the amount of land a company could own. His development programs brought some prosperity for an emergent middle class. A rural agricultural society was transformed into an industrial working class. Muñoz Marín also launched Operación Serenidad ("Operation Serenity"), a series of projects geared toward promoting education and appreciation of the arts.

Civil rights groups and the Catholic Church criticized Operation Bootstrap, for what they saw as government-promoted birth control, encouragement of surgical sterilization, and fostering the migration of Puerto Ricans to the United States mainland. In 1943 Puerto Rico would pass a Civil Rights Act would ended a great deal of race-related discrimination in Puerto Rico. In 1945, Eric Williams would acknowledge the progress in civil rights in Puerto Rico at the time, conceding that despite some issues related to class discrimination, "The Negro enjoys equality with the white man politically as well as legally," and that even opponents of Muñoz Marín "agree that he and his party have given Negroes a square deal and opened positions to them, especially in the teaching profession and the higher ranks of the police force, from which they were conventionally debarred."

=== World War II ===
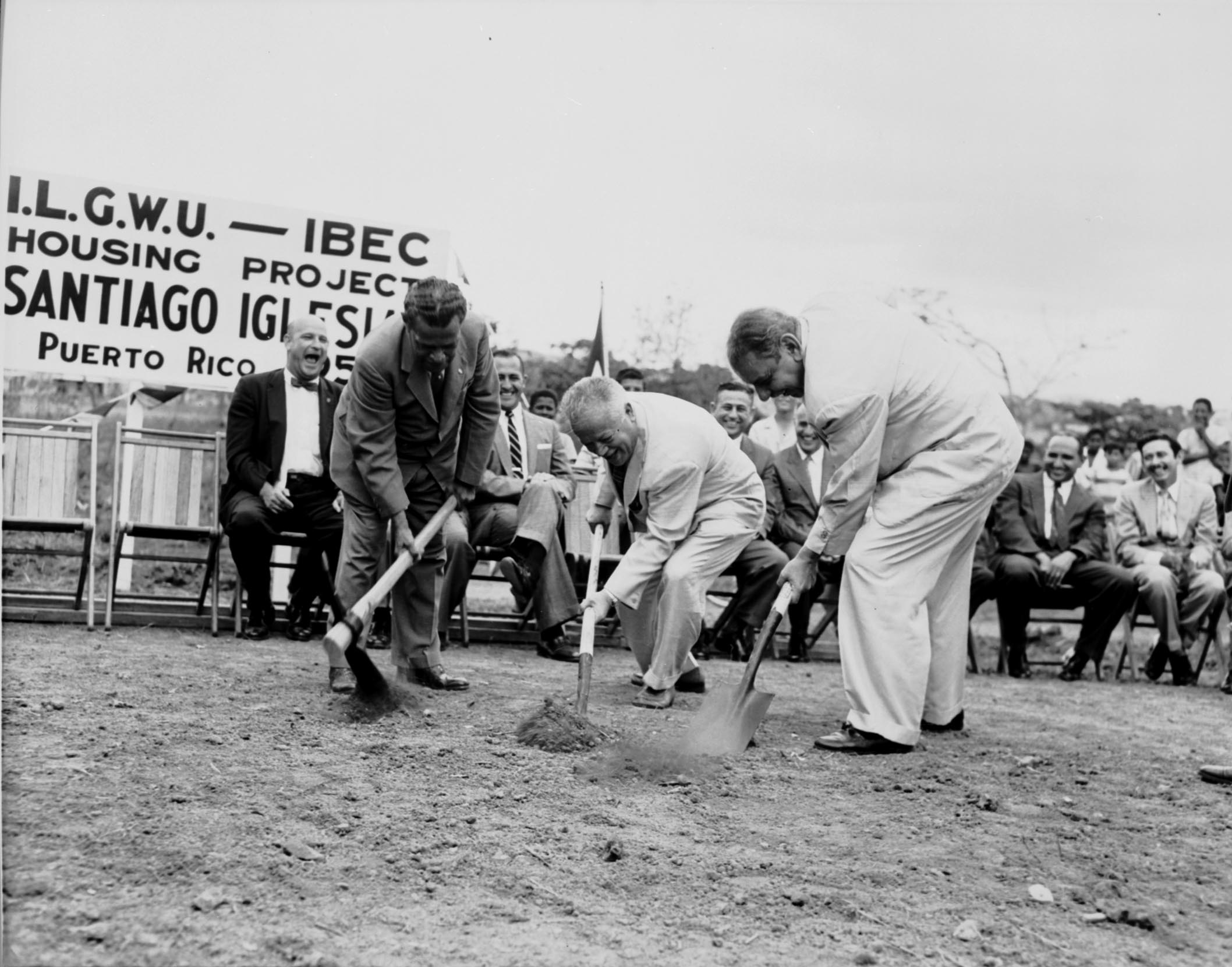
David Dubinsky, Governor Munoz, and an unidentified man break ground for the ILGWU - IBEC Santiago Iglesias housing project in Puerto Rico, 1957

During the early stages of World War II, many thousands of Puerto Ricans were drafted to serve in the United States Army. This eased problems of overpopulation in the main island. Muñoz Marín promoted the construction of public housing projects to resolve a housing shortage. During the war he established low-interest scholarships and loans for the residents who were not drafted. To address health issues, he established free public clinics, which opened throughout Puerto Rico. In 1943 Puerto Rico would pass a Civil Rights Act.

In 1944 the Popular Democratic Party won a majority again in the election, repeating the political victory of the previous elections. In 1947, Congress approved legislation allowing Puerto Ricans to elect their own Governor. Muñoz Marín successfully campaigned for the post and was the first democratically elected Governor of Puerto Rico and the second Puerto Rican to serve in that post.

=== Passage of Law 53 (the Gag Law) ===
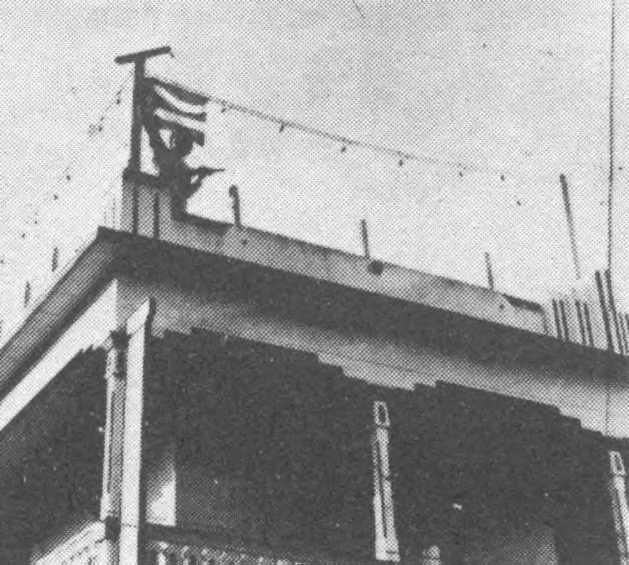
Puerto Rican flag removed by an American soldier

In 1948, the Puerto Rican Senate passed Law 53, also known as the Gag Law, which would restrain the rights of the independence and Nationalist movements in the island. Marin was instrumental in the passage of this law as he was in control of the Senate at the time. The passage of the law allowed him to arrest any suspected nationalist without cause or due process and so allowed him to squash any potential question to his authority.

The Ley de la Mordaza (a gag law) passed the legislature on May 21, 1948, and was signed into law on June 10, 1948, by the U.S.-appointed governor of Puerto Rico, Jesús T. Piñero. It closely resembled the anti-communist Smith Act passed in the United States, and was perceived as an effort to suppress opposition to the PPD and the independence movement.

Under this law it became a crime to own or display a Puerto Rican flag anywhere, even in one's own home. It also became a crime to speak against the U.S. government; to speak in favor of Puerto Rican independence; to print, publish, sell or exhibit any material intended to paralyze or destroy the insular government; or to organize any society, group or assembly of people with a similar destructive intent. Anyone accused and found guilty of disobeying the law could be sentenced to ten years' imprisonment, a fine of $10,000 (US), or both.

According to Dr. Leopoldo Figueroa, a member of the Partido Estadista Puertorriqueño (Puerto Rican Statehood Party) and the only non-member of PPD in the Puerto Rican House, the law was repressive and in direct violation of the First Amendment of the U.S. Constitution, which guarantees freedom of speech. Figueroa pointed out that every Puerto Rican was born with full citizenship, and full U.S. constitutional protections.

Muñoz Marín used Law 53 to arrest thousands of Puerto Ricans without due process – including members of other political parties, and people who did not vote for him.

=== Governor ===
Muñoz Marín officially took office on January 2, 1949. He held the post of Governor for sixteen years, being re-elected again in 1952, 1956 and 1960. In 1957, Muñoz Marín was awarded an honorary Doctor of Laws degree (LL.D.) from Bates College.

Having made progress on illiteracy and other social problems, the party began debating how to establish an autonomous government. Muñoz Marín and his officials agreed to adopt a "Free Associated State" structure, which had been proposed by Barceló decades before. In Spanish the proposal's name remained unchanged, but in English, it was commonly referred to as a "Commonwealth", to avoid confusion with full statehood. The main goal of the proposal was to provide more autonomy to the island, including executive functions similar to those in states, and to pass a constitution.

During his terms as governor, a Constitutional Convention of Puerto Rico, was called. Muñoz Marín participated in that and the drafting of the Constitution of Puerto Rico. It was passed by 82% of the people of Puerto Rico, and approved by the United States Congress in 1952. Supporters of independence left the PPD and founded the Puerto Rican Independence Party soon after.

Awarded the Presidential Medal of Freedom with Distinction in 1963

The Nationalist Party of Puerto Rico, led by Albizu Campos, also supported full independence and had abandoned the electoral process after low support. On October 30, 1950, a group of Puerto Rican nationalists attacked the governor's mansion and attempted to assassinate Muñoz Marín, by firing shots into his office. Muñoz Marín mobilized the Puerto Rican National Guard under the command of Puerto Rico Adjutant General Luis R. Esteves and sent them to confront the Nationalists in various towns, besides San Juan, such as Jayuya and Utuado. He ordered the police to arrest many of the Nationalists, including Albizu Campos. Subsequently, the Muñoz Marín administration used law 53, known as Ley de Mordaza (lit. "the gag law") to arrest thousands of Puerto Ricans without due process, including pro-independence supporters who were not involved in the uprisings.

The inauguration acts for the establishment of the Estado Libre Associado took place on July 25, 1952. Security for the event was tightened to avoid any incident, and invitations were issued. Muñoz Marín feared that the new status could affect the Puerto Rican culture or "Americanize" the island's language. The government began promoting cultural activities, founding the Pablo Casals Festival, Music Conservatory, and Puerto Rico's Institute of Culture.

During the decade of the 1950s, most jíbaros pursued work in factories instead of agriculture, to avoid the losses from frequent hurricanes. Many people migrated to New York City during this period for its good industrial jobs. Muñoz Marín said that he "did not agree with" the "continuing situation", and that the "battle for good life, should not have all its emphasis placed on industrialization. Part of it must be placed on agriculture." American critics felt that he encouraged the migration to reduce overpopulation. Despite efforts to provide more work in agriculture on the islands, the migration continued.

In 1952, three United States senators referred to Muñoz Marin as a dictator when he would not approve "New Industry" tax exemptions for housing construction projects. Muñoz Marin said housing was not a new industry in Puerto Rico and the senators, Olin D. Johnston, Owen Brewster, and John Marshall Butler responded in kind by calling him a dictator on the floor of the US Senate.

On December 6, 1962, Muñoz Marín was awarded the Presidential Medal of Freedom by US President John F. Kennedy. By 1964, Muñoz Marín had been governor for sixteen years. A group of younger members of the Popular Democratic Party felt that he should retire. They suggested that he resign, and presented a proposal for term limits — two terms for elected officials. The group named themselves Los veinte y dos ("The twenty-twos") and began running a campaign, calling on civilians for support.

Victoria, Muñoz Marín's youngest daughter joined the group, which he didn't oppose. The day before the party had an assembly to elect its candidates, Muñoz Marín announced his decision not to run for another term. He recommended Roberto Sánchez Vilella, his Secretary of State, for the party's candidacy. When the crowd called for "four more years", Muñoz Marín said, "I am not your strength ... You are your own strength." He was the last governor of Puerto Rico to be born under Spanish rule, as the island was annexed by the United States months after his birth. Sánchez Vilella was elected as governor.

== Later years ==
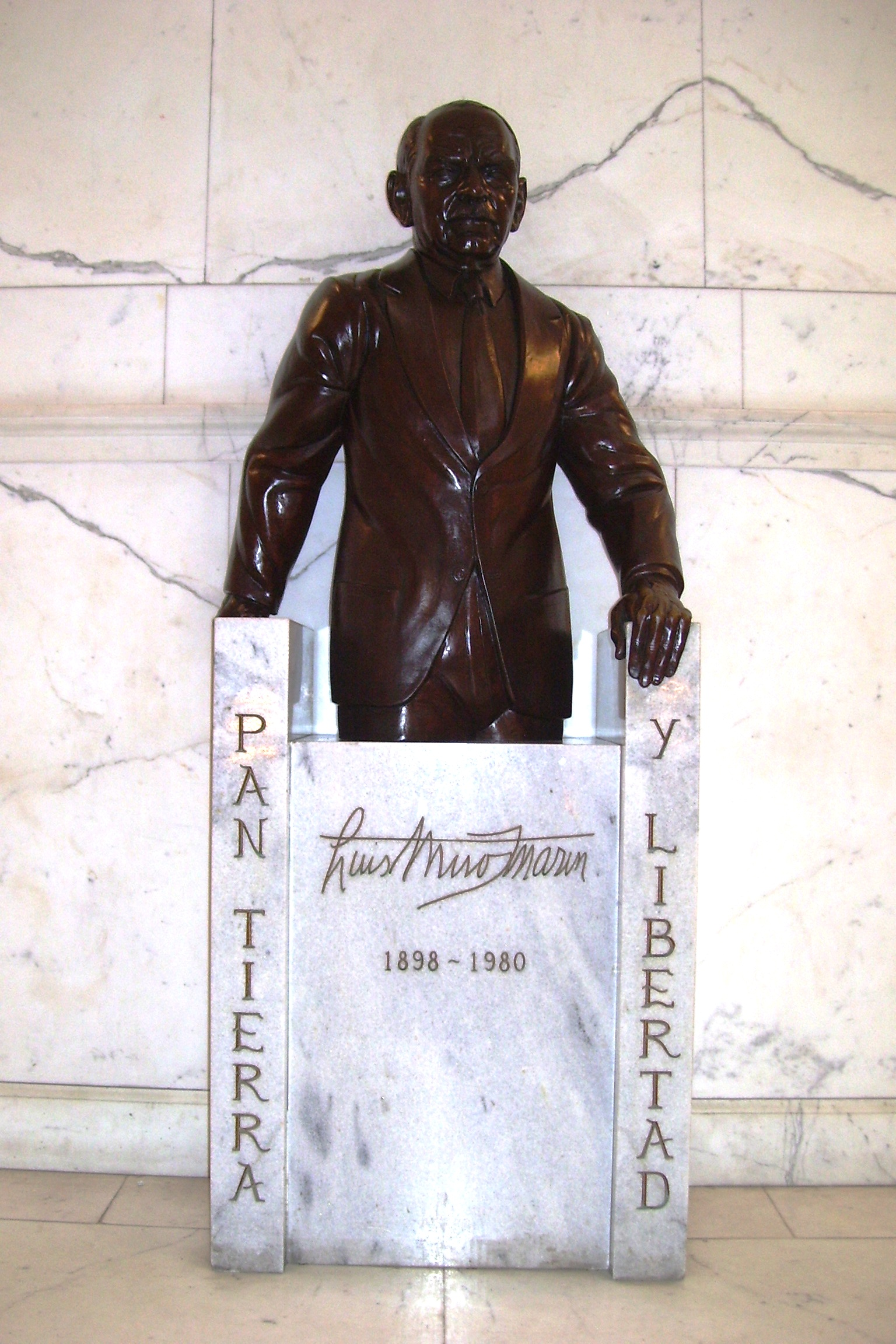
Sculpture of Muñoz Marín inside the Capitol of Puerto Rico

After leaving the post of governor, Muñoz Marín continued his public service until 1970 as a member of the Puerto Rico Senate. In 1968, he had a serious dispute with Governor Sánchez Vilella. Still an influential figure inside the Popular Democratic Party, Muñoz Marín decided not to support Sánchez's re-election bid.

Governor Sánchez purchased the franchise of The People's Party (Partido del Pueblo) and decided to run for governor under this new party.

The PPD was defeated for the first time, and Luis A. Ferré was elected as governor. Muñoz Marín and Sánchez Vilella's friendship was severely strained after this.

=== Retirement ===
After resigning his senate seat in 1970, Muñoz Marín temporarily moved to Italy, where one of his daughters, Viviana, had established residence. During this time he traveled to various destinations in Europe, including France, Spain and Greece.

He returned to Puerto Rico two years later, when he began writing an autobiography. He promoted the gubernatorial candidacy of the senate's president Rafael Hernández Colón, the new leader of the Popular Democratic Party.

Late in his life, Muñoz Marín's health weakened. On January 5, 1976, he suffered a severe stroke, which temporarily affected his ability to move, read and speak. On April 30, 1980, he died at the age of 82, after suffering complications from a severe fever. His funeral became an island-wide event, dwarfing his own father's funeral in 1916, and attended by tens of thousands of followers. He was buried at the Muñoz Rivera Family Mausoleum in Barranquitas, Puerto Rico

== Legacy and honors ==
- On November 13, 1961, John F. Kennedy honored Muñoz Marín for his accomplishments with a state dinner at the White House, and in 1963 he was awarded the Presidential Medal of Freedom, with Special Distinction. The citation read: "Poet, politician, public servant, patriot, he has led his people on to new heights of dignity and purpose and transformed a stricken land into a vital society."
- Muñoz Marín also received the highest decorations from various other governments, including: France, which awarded him the Grand Cross of the French Legion; Panama, which conferred on him the Order of Vasco Núñez de Balboa; and Peru, which honored him with the Grand Cross of the Order of the Sun of Peru.
- Muñoz Marín received Honorary Doctor of Laws degrees from Rutgers University, Bates College, the University of Kansas, Columbia University, and Harvard University, where he gave several lectures concerning Puerto Rico's progress and International Relations; he was also a Commencement Day speaker for the university in 1955.
- Muñoz Marín was featured twice on the cover of TIME magazine, in 1949 and 1958. The articles called him "one of the most influential politicians in recent times, whose works will be remembered for years to come."
- In Rexford Tugwell's book The Art of Politics, as Practiced by Three Great Americans: Franklin Delano Roosevelt, Luis Muñoz Marín, and Fiorello H. LaGuardia (1958), Tugwell described Muñoz Marín's achievements,

Munoz led a movement and created a party, which consolidated the latent power of the stricken Puerto Rican mass and used it to force into being a disciplined program for rejuvenation. This effort has significance beyond itself. It soon became a wonder of a world looking for the means to lift backward peoples from the stew of poverty and demagoguism, which has become so characteristic of all the old colonial area. He was the creator, as much as one man could be, of a new status for a whole people and a new relationship among political entities. The Commonwealth of Puerto Rico was a brilliant invention and its bringing into being a remarkable achievement.

- Muñoz Marín was presented with the Key to the City of Managua, Nicaragua, by Nicaraguan President Luis Somoza Debayle.
- In 1985, Puerto Rico's largest international airport was renamed Luis Muñoz Marín International Airport in his honor.
- In 1990, the United States Postal Service issued a 5-cent stamp honoring Muñoz Marín in their Great Americans Series.
- In Cleveland, Ohio, the Luis Muñoz Marín Dual Language Academy, located in the La Villa Hispana neighborhood, serves students from pre-kindergarten to grade 8.
- In Newark, New Jersey, the Luis Muñoz Marín School For Social Justice serves students from pre-kindergarten to grade 8.
- In The Bronx, the Luis Muñoz Marín Public School 159 serves students from kindergraten through grade 5.
- There is a 1974 oil painting of Muñoz Marín by Puerto Rican painter Francisco Rodón at the National Portrait Gallery of the Smithsonian Museum in Washington DC.
- An illustrated color portrait of Muñoz Marín, by Bernard Safrin, was on the cover of Time on June 23, 1968.
- An etching of Muñoz Marín is on a five cent red stamp in the Great Americans postage stamp series, issued by the United States Postal Service on February 18, 1990.
- In Philadelphia, Pennsylvania, the Luis Muñoz Marín Elementary School in the Fairhill neighborhood serves students from pre-kindergarten to grade 8.
- Luis Munoz Marin Blvd, a major throughfare, in Jersey City, NJ
- In Bridgeport, Connecticut, Luis Muñoz Marín School on the East Side of the city was opened in January of 1992 and dedicated on May 3rd, 1992 to honor his achievements. It serves students from pre-kindergarten to grade 8.

== See also ==
- Portrait of Luis Muñoz Marín
- List of Puerto Rican writers
- List of Puerto Ricans
- Puerto Rican literature
- List of governors of Puerto Rico
- Puerto Rican Politics
- List of Puerto Rican Presidential Medal of Freedom recipients

Party political offices
| New office | Chair of the Puerto Rico Popular Democratic Party; 1938–1972 | Succeeded by Rafael Hernández Colón |
| New political party | Popular Democratic nominee for Governor of Puerto Rico; 1948, 1952, 1956, 1960 | Succeeded by Roberto Sánchez Vilella |
Political offices
| Preceded by Rafael Martínez Nadal | President of the Puerto Rico Senate; 1941–1949 | Succeeded by Samuel R. Quiñones |
| Preceded by Jesús T. Piñero | Governor of Puerto Rico; 1949–1965 | Succeeded by Roberto Sánchez Vilella |
