= Muñoz Rivera Family Mausoleum =

Monument in Barranquitas, Puerto Rico

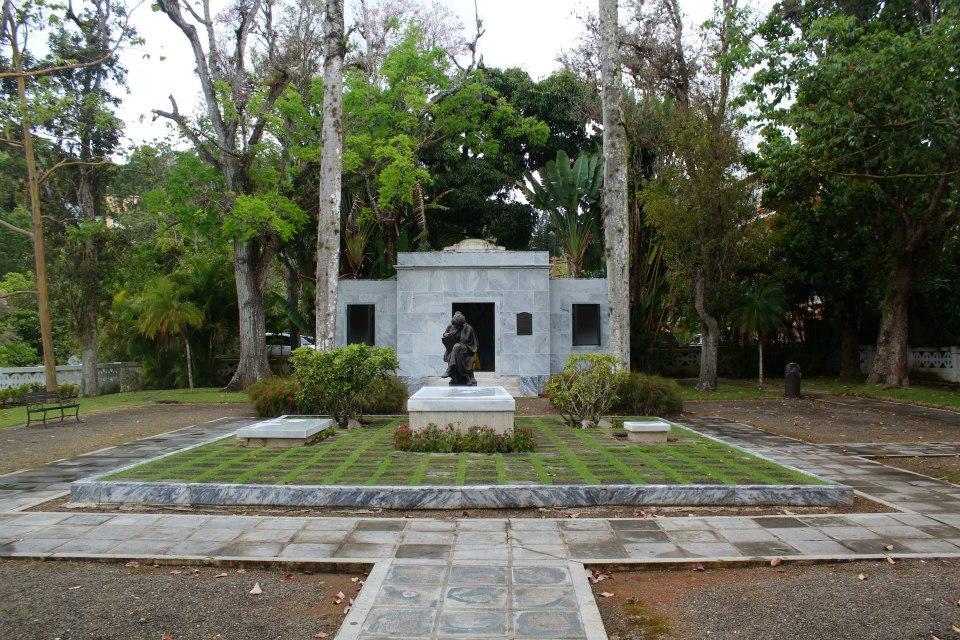
Mausoleum and gardens.

The Muñoz Rivera Family Mausoleum (Spanish: Mausoleo de la Familia Muñoz Rivera), colloquially known as the Muñoz Mausoleum (Mausoleo Muñoz), is a monument and mausoleum located in Barranquitas, Puerto Rico. The mausoleum is the burial site of Luis Muñoz Rivera, former Resident Commissioner and an important figure in the political history of Puerto Rico. His parents were also buried there and, since 1980, so are his wife, Amalia Marín Castilla, and son, Luis Muñoz Marín, who was the first democratically elected Governor of Puerto Rico.

The mausoleum today also houses a memorial, a mural and a small museum dedicated to the history of the Muñoz family.

== See also ==
- Casa Natal de Luis Muñoz Rivera
