= Aníbal Colón Rosado =

Puerto Rican writer (born 1946)

Aníbal Colón Rosado, also known by the pen name Aníbal Colón de la Vega (born June 15, 1946 and registered on 17, 1946, in Barranquitas, Puerto Rico) is a writer and educator. He has published works in multiple genres, including essays, poetry, narrative prose, and theology and philosophy.

== Education ==
In 1996, Colón Rosado received a Doctorate Honors Causa in journalism from the Pontifical Catholic University of Puerto Rico in Ponce.

== Career ==
From 1984-1999, he directed the El Visitante, the weekly newspaper from the Catholic Church in Puerto Rico, and started the accompanying monthly Revista 'Familia y Escuela' .

During this time, he wrote and published profusely, founding in 1997 the publishing house Editorial Poemar

== Writing ==
Colón Rosado is the author of numerous books published over several decades. His work includes poetry, essays, prose, and philosophical texts, often addressing themes related to philosophy, cultural identity, and existential questions.

Selected works include:

- El credo del coquí (1979)
- Filosofía de la técnica (1992)
- El libro de los epitafios (1997)
- Historia de una pasión (2007)
- Letras en el tiempo (2011), a compilation of his journalistic writings
- Vino añejo (2014)
- La mirada de Beatriz (2015)
- Periscopio (2017)
- Una carta profética (2022)

- Colon-Rosado, Anibal (2013). Filosofia e imaginacion (in Spanish) (1st ed.). Editoral Poemar (published June 26, 2013).
- Colon-Rosado, Anibal (2006). EL CIRCULO DE LOS MESES FILOSOFIA DE LO (in Spanish). Editoral Poemar.
- Colon de La Vega, Anibal (2012). Madeja (in Spanish). CreateSpace Independent Publishing Platform (published December 18, 2012). ISBN 978-1481291095.
- Colón de la Vega, Anibal (2005). Breviario íntimo (in Spanish). Editorial Poemar.
- Colon de La Vega, Anibal (2013). Historia de una pasion (in Spanish). CreateSpace Independent Publishing Platform (published April 14, 2013). ISBN 978-1484124611.
- Colón Rosado, Aníbal (2012). Logofanías (in Spanish). Puerto Rico: CreateSpace Independent Publishing Platform (published December 22, 2012).
