= Barranquitas, Puerto Rico =

Town and municipality in Puerto Rico

Barranquitas Municipio Autónomo de Barranquitas
- Town and Municipality
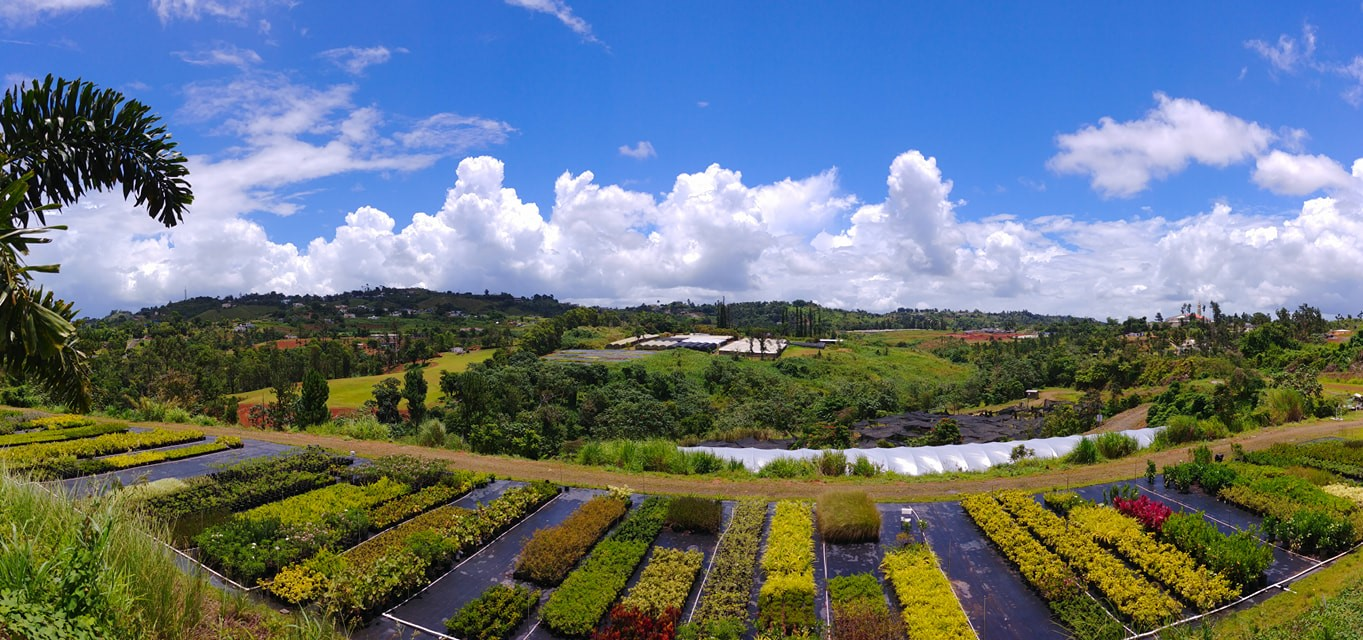
- Agricultural landscape in Quebradillas

- Flag Coat of arms
- Nicknames: "La Cuna de Próceres", "Cuna Feria de Artesanías", "El Altar de la Patria", "El Pueblo de Luis Muñoz Rivera"
- Anthem: "Aquí en el centro de nuestra tierra"
- Map of Puerto Rico highlighting Barranquitas Municipality
- Coordinates: 18°11′12″N 66°18′23″W
- Sovereign state: United States
- Commonwealth: Puerto Rico
- Settled: early 19th century
- Founded: June 3, 1803
- Founder: Antonio Aponte Ramos
- Barrios: 8 barrios: Barrancas; Barranquitas barrio-pueblo; Cañabón; Helechal; Honduras; Palo Hincado; Quebrada Grande; Quebradillas

Government
  - Mayor: Elliot Colón Blanco (PNP)
  - Senatorial dist.: 6 - Guayama
  - Representative dist.: 26 and 28

Area
  - Total: 33.21 sq mi (86.01 km^{2})
  - Land: 33 sq mi (86 km^{2})
  - Water: 0.0039 sq mi (.01 km^{2})

Population (2020)
  - Total: 28,983
  - Estimate (2025): 29,509 ▲
  - Rank: 42nd in Puerto Rico
  - Density: 870/sq mi (340/km^{2})
- Demonym: Barranquiteños
- Time zone: UTC-4 (AST)
- ZIP Code: 00794
- Area code: 787/939
- Website: http://barranquitaspr.net/pueblo/

Barranquitas (Spanish pronunciation: [baraŋˈkitas], locally [baraŋˈkitaʔ]) is a small mountain town and municipality located in the Cordillera Central region of Puerto Rico, south of Corozal and Naranjito; north of Coamo and Aibonito; west of Comerío and Cidra; and east of Orocovis. Barranquitas is spread over 6 barrios and Barranquitas Pueblo (the downtown area and the administrative center of the city). It is part of the San Juan-Caguas-Guaynabo Metropolitan Statistical Area.

Barranquitas is about one hour by winding roads from San Juan, the capital. It is nestled amid hills and mountains, and nearby, between Barranquitas and Aibonito, is the San Cristóbal Canyon; one of the deepest canyons in the West Indies. For years, the overlook was used as a municipal garbage; in the last decade, the refuse was removed and the site restored.

== History ==
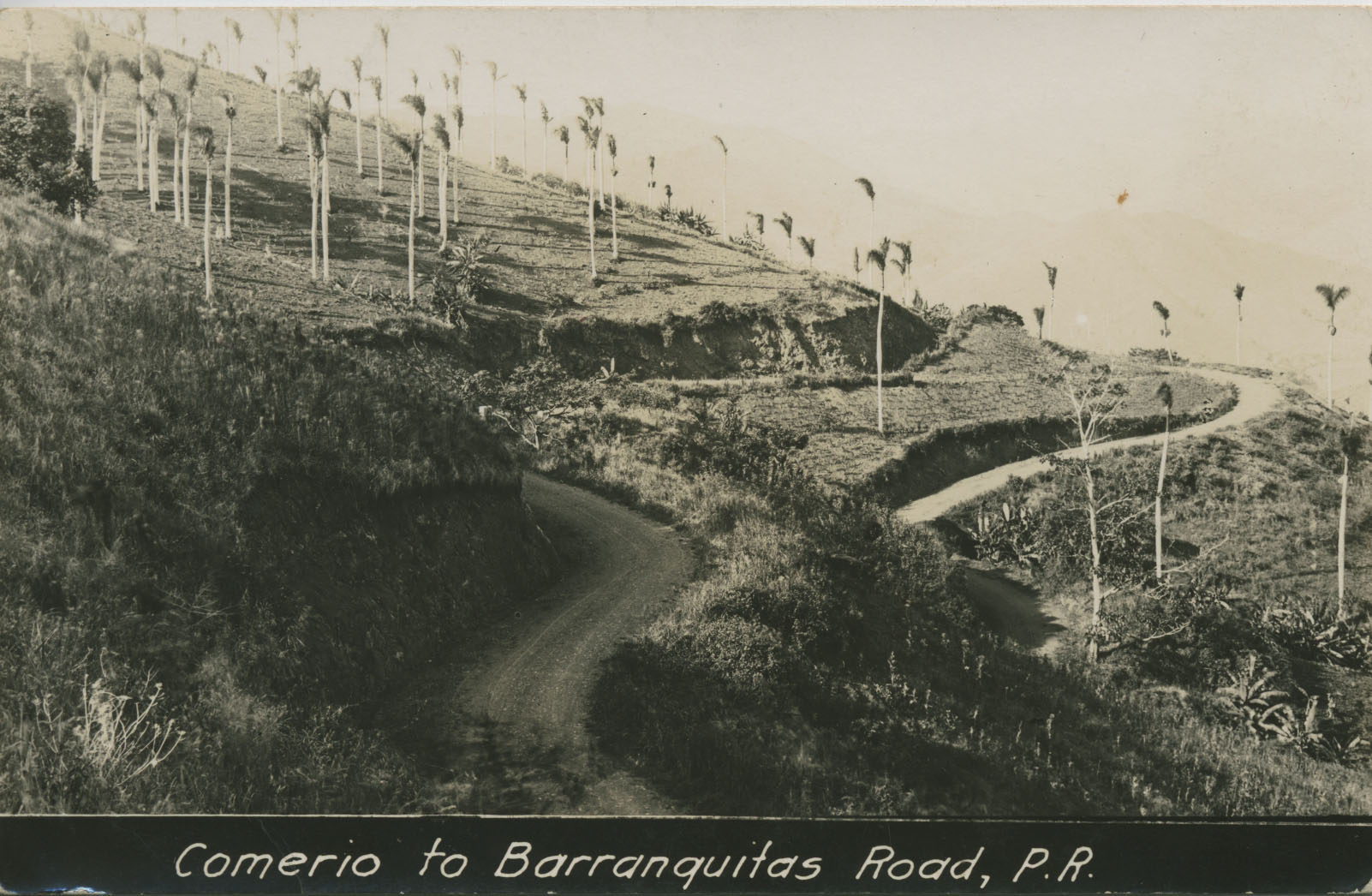
Comerío to Barranquitas Road c. 1900-1917

Barranquitas's local Taino Cacique was called Orocobix.

The town was founded in 1803 by Antonio Aponte Ramos. Early in the 20th century, Barranquitas residents, known as Barranquiteños, had a short but legendary territory war with residents of the city of Comerío.

In 1899, the United States Department of War conducted a census of Puerto Rico finding that the population of Barranquitas was 8,103.

Hurricane Maria on September 20, 2017, triggered numerous landslides in Barranquitas with its significant amount of rainfall and its nearly category 5 winds. Many residents did not receive help for weeks after the hurricane made landfall as entry into the municipality was hampered by downed trees and telephone poles, landslides, and highways that had split in two.

In Barranquitas, up to 1000 homes, and its highways were destroyed by landslides. Forty days after the hurricane, none of Barranquitas' 29,000 residents had their electrical power restored. Barranquitas' agriculture industry was decimated with one farmer saying he'd lost his five thousand plantain trees, apio, and other minor crops.

Scenes around Barranquitas after Hurricane María:

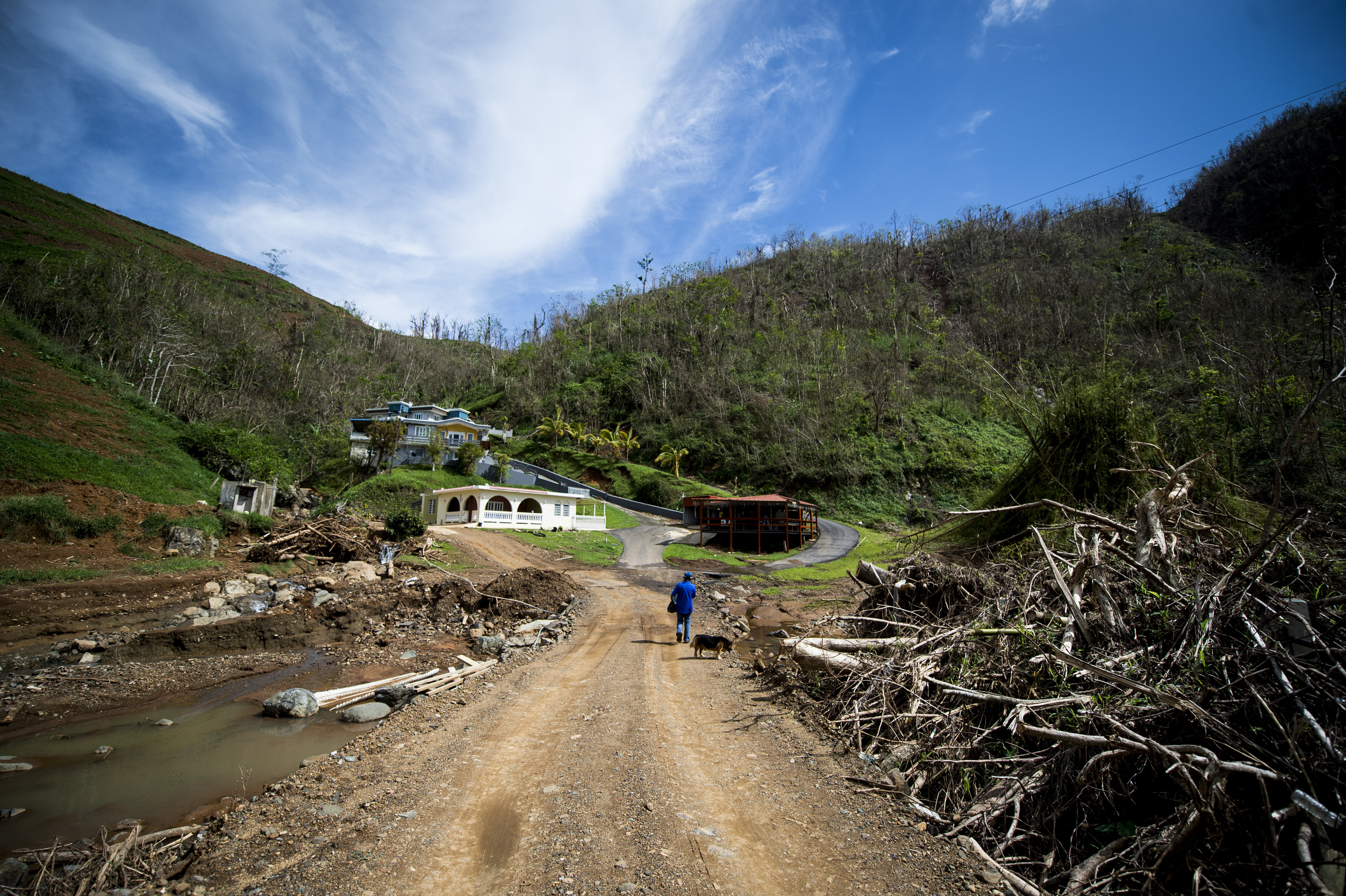
Returning home with water and food provided by FEMA on Oct. 17, 2017

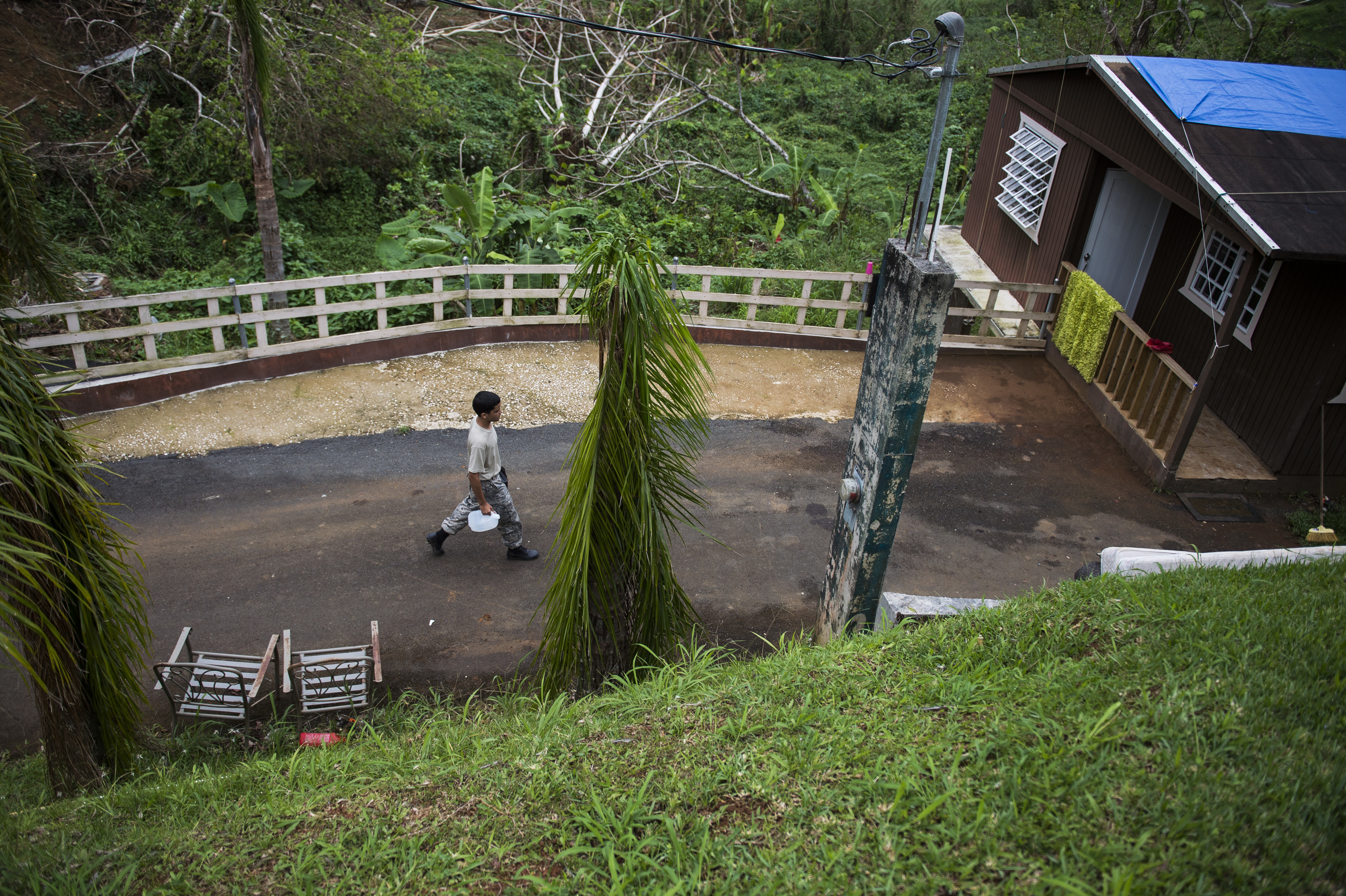
Returning home with water

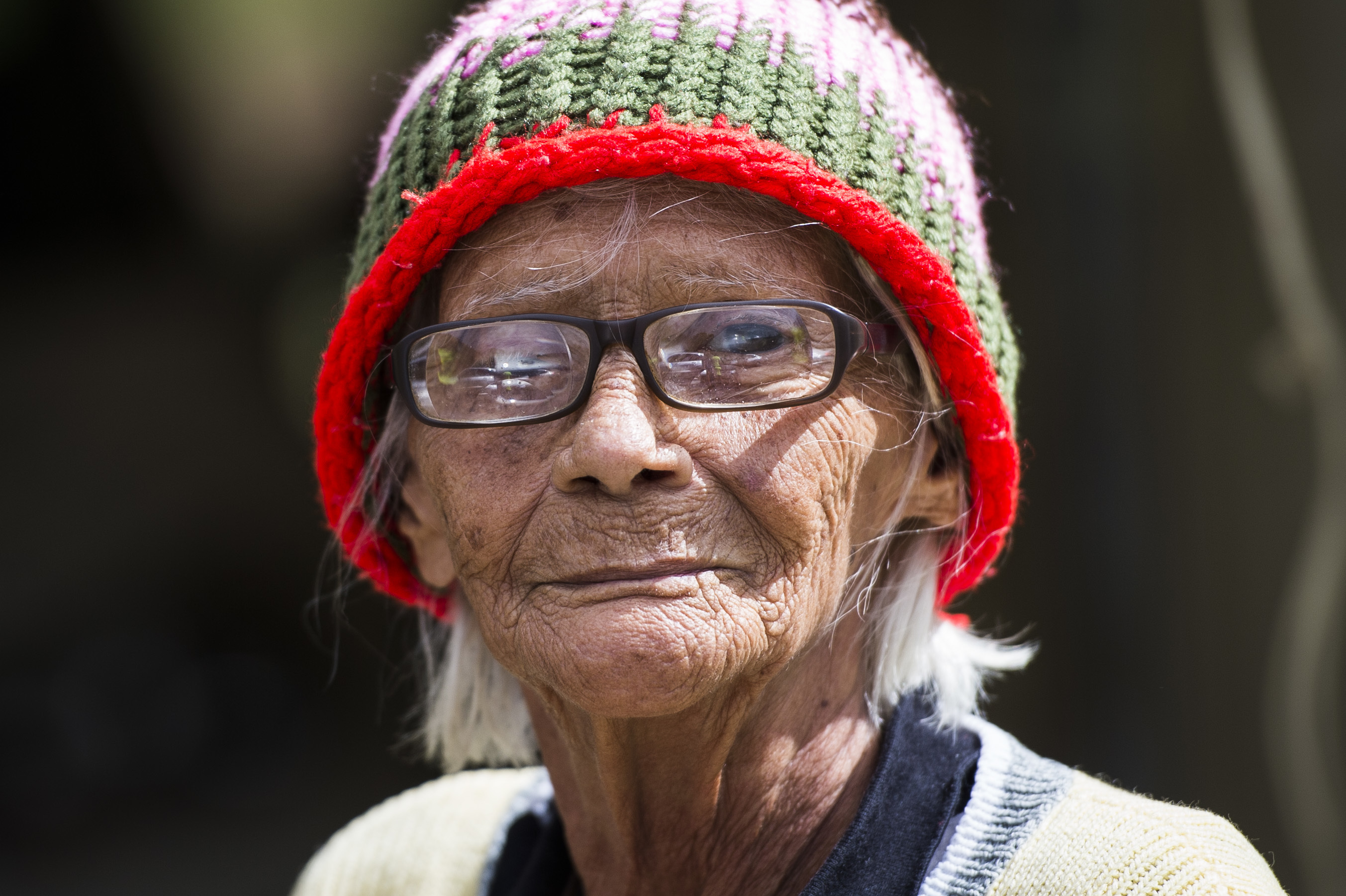
Elderly were especially vulnerable after Hurricane Maria

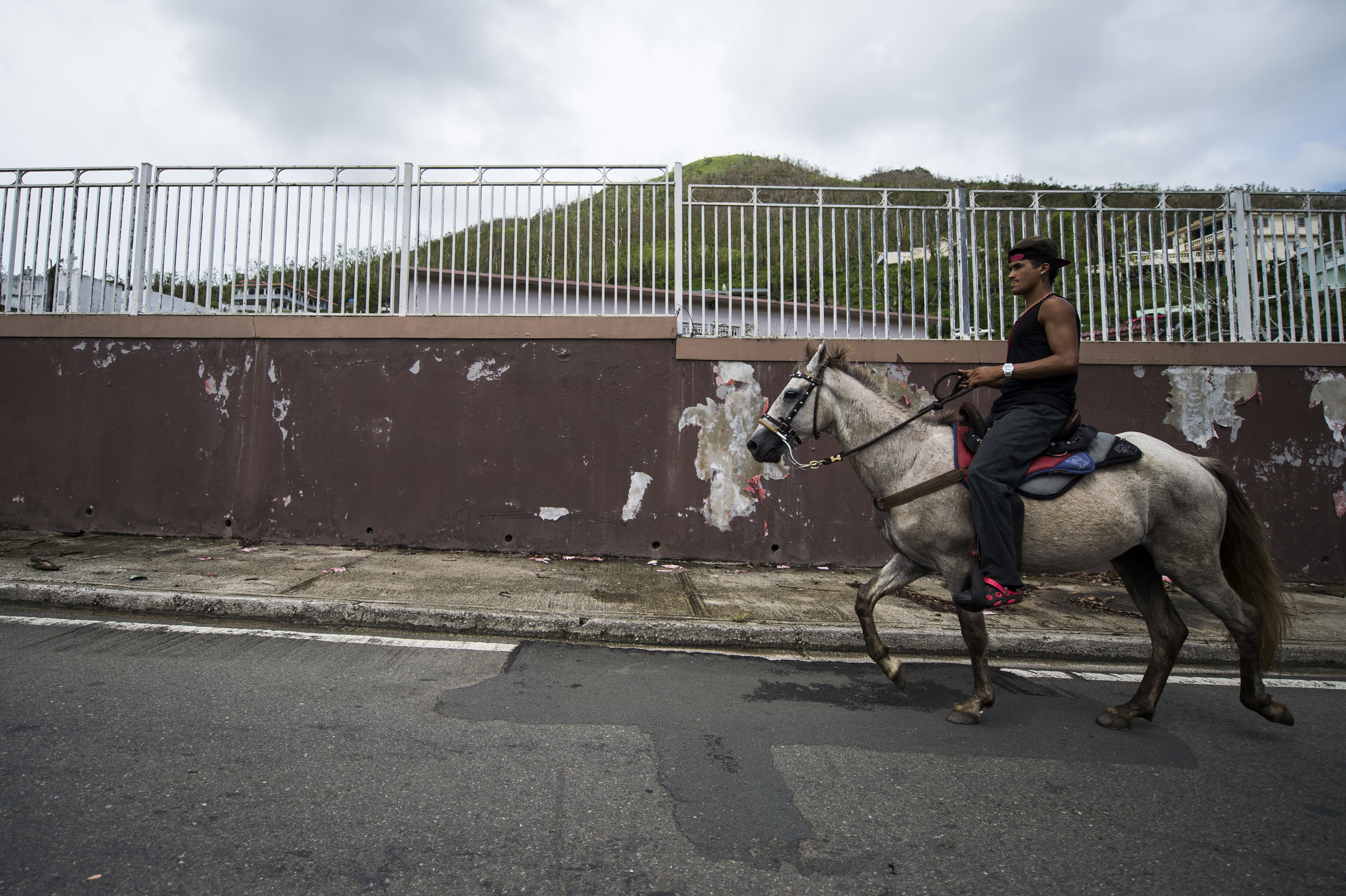
A resident on a horse after the hurricane

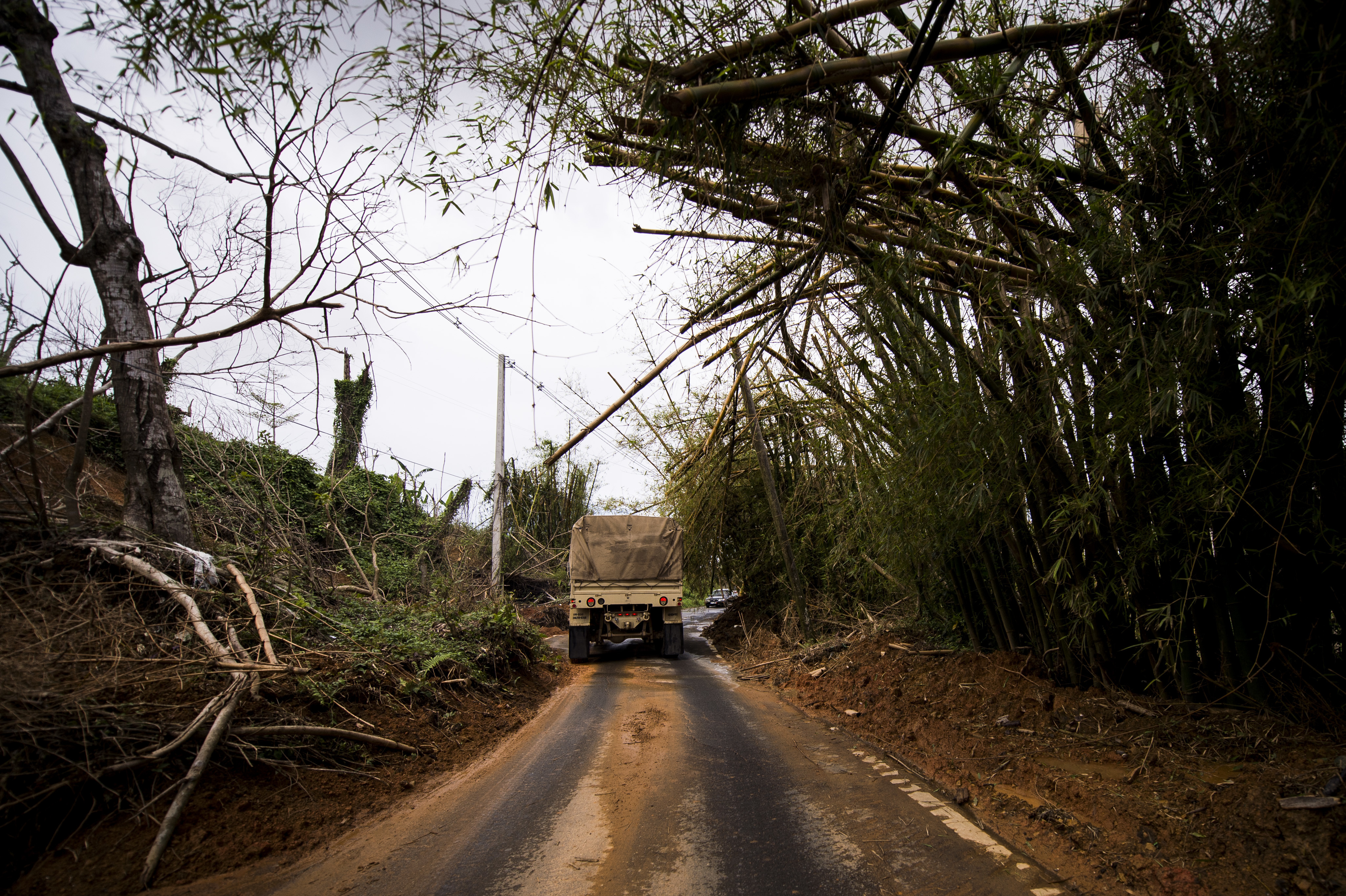
US Army transport vehicle carrying food and water provided by FEMA on Oct. 17, 2017

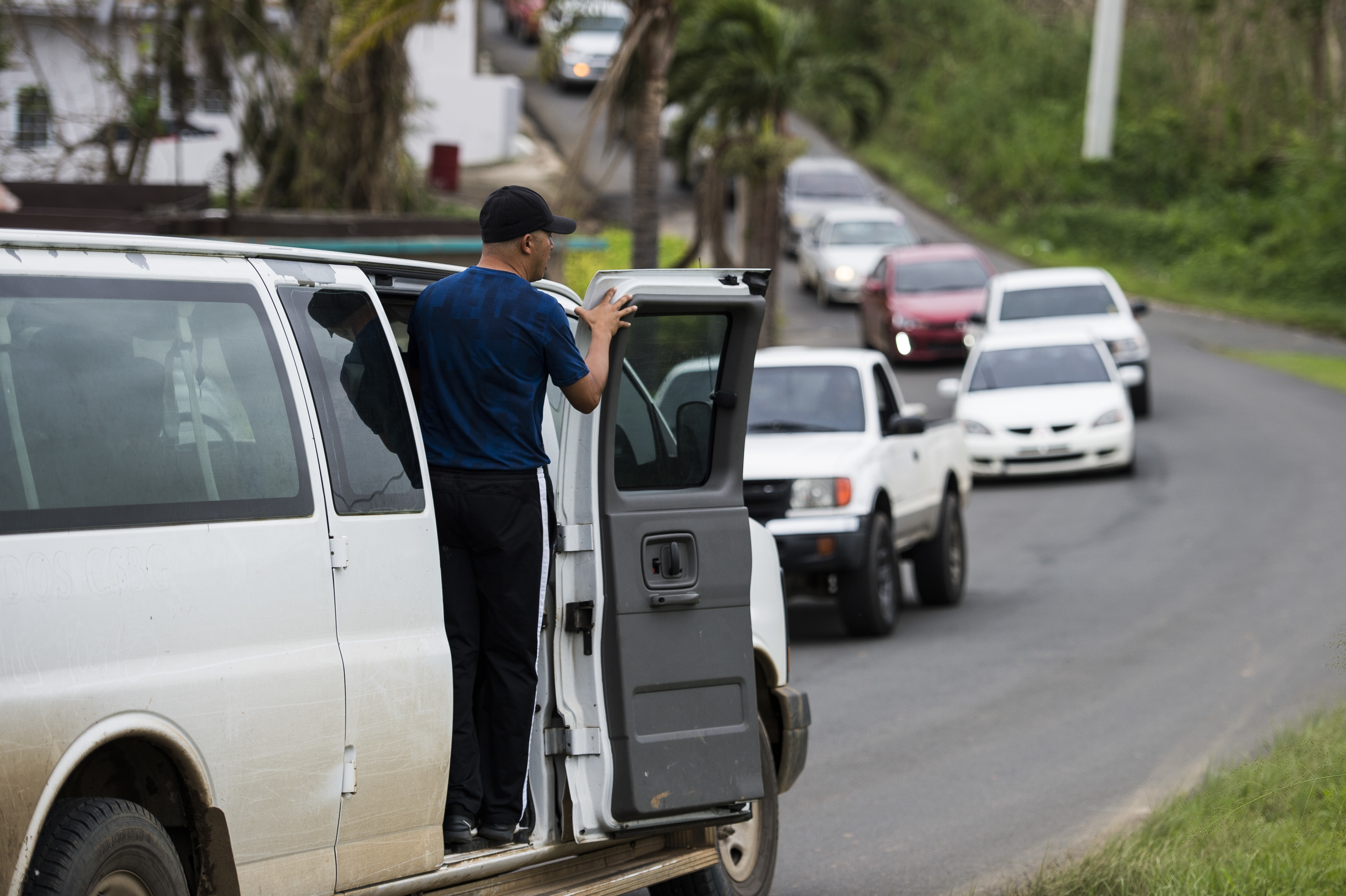
Volunteer distributing water after Hurricane Maria on Oct. 18, 2017

== Geography ==
Barranquitas is a landlocked municipality in the middle of the Cordillera Central of Puerto Rico, the main mountain range that crosses the island from west to east. It is bordered by the municipalities of Corozal, Naranjito, Coamo, Aibonito, Orocovis, and Comerío. Barranquitas has a surface area of 34 square miles (88.4 km^{2}).

The terrain is mostly mountainous. Some of the peaks found in the municipality are La Torrecilla and Farallón. Barranquitas is also the site of the San Cristóbal Canyon and Las Bocas Canyon.

=== Water features ===
Rivers of Barranquitas include the Río de Barranquitas, Río Grande de Manatí, Piñonas, Río Hondo, and Río Usabón.

There are 14 bridges in Barranquitas.

=== Barrios ===
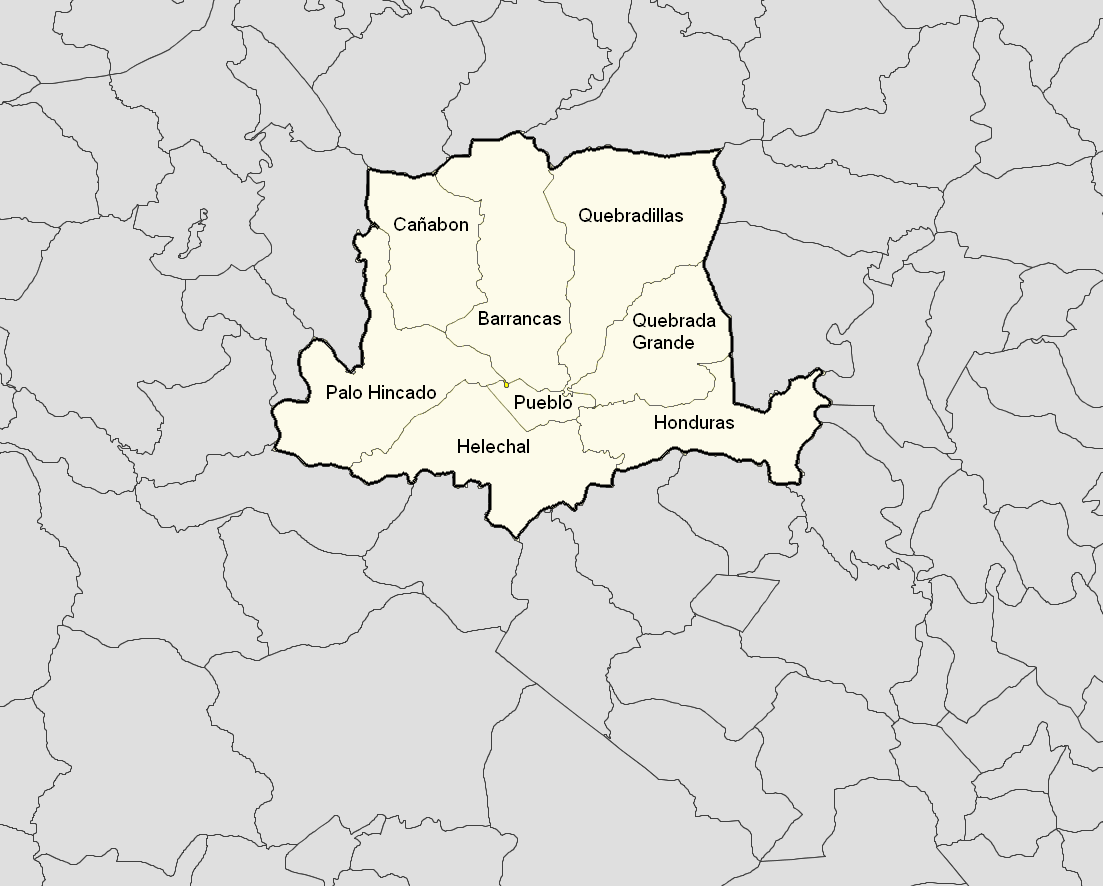
Subdivisions of Barranquitas.

Like all municipalities of Puerto Rico, Barranquitas is subdivided into barrios. The municipal buildings, central square and large Catholic church are located in a small barrio referred to as "el pueblo", near the center of the municipality.

1. Barrancas
2. Barranquitas barrio-pueblo
3. Cañabón
4. Helechal
5. Honduras
6. Palo Hincado
7. Quebrada Grande
8. Quebradillas

=== Sectors ===
Barrios (which are like minor civil divisions) and subbarrios, are further subdivided into smaller areas called sectores (sectors in English). The types of sectores may vary, from normally sector to urbanización to reparto to barriada to residencial, among others.

=== Special Communities ===
Comunidades Especiales de Puerto Rico (Special Communities of Puerto Rico) are marginalized communities whose citizens are experiencing a certain amount of social exclusion. A map shows these communities occur in nearly every municipality of the commonwealth. Of the 742 places that were on the list in 2014, the following barrios, communities, sectors, or neighborhoods were in Barranquitas: El Amparo neighborhood, Cañabón barrio, La Vega neighborhood, Calle Abajo (Calle Melitón Pérez), La Loma, La Torre, Los Pinos, Quebrada Grande barrio, and Tres Caminos.

== Energy consortium ==
An Energy Consortium was signed in late February 2019, by Villalba, Orocovis, Morovis, Ciales and Barranquitas municipalities. The consortium is the first of its kind on the commonwealth and intends to have these municipalities work together, to safeguard their communities, in the event of a catastrophe, by creating resilient, and efficient energy networks with backups.

== Tourism ==
=== Landmarks ===
Barranquitas is the burial place of two prominent Puerto Rican politicians; Luis Muñoz Rivera (who was born in the town) and his son, Governor Luis Muñoz Marín (who was born in San Juan). This has made Barranquitas a popular tourist attraction among Puerto Ricans. The birthplace of Muñoz Rivera has been converted into a museum. The mausoleum of the Muñoz Rivera family is a place of interest. Among those buried there are Muñoz Rivera and his son and daughter-in-law, Luis Muñoz Marín, and his second wife Inés Mendoza de Muñoz.

Other known places of interest in Barranquitas are the San Cristóbal Canyon, Las Bocas Canyon, and the ruins of Hacienda Margarita. El Cortijo Castle is an old, historical structure, which is currently a museum. Camp Morton (Campamento Morton) is a popular spot for activities and retreats.

To stimulate local tourism during the COVID-19 pandemic in Puerto Rico, the Puerto Rico Tourism Company launched the Voy Turistiendo (I'm Touring) campaign in 2021. The campaign featured a passport book with a page for each municipality. The Voy Turisteando Barranquitas passport page lists Cañon de San Cristobal, Plaza Bicentenaria, Museo de la Familia Muñoz Rivera, and the Feria de Artesanías, as places of interest.

== Culture ==
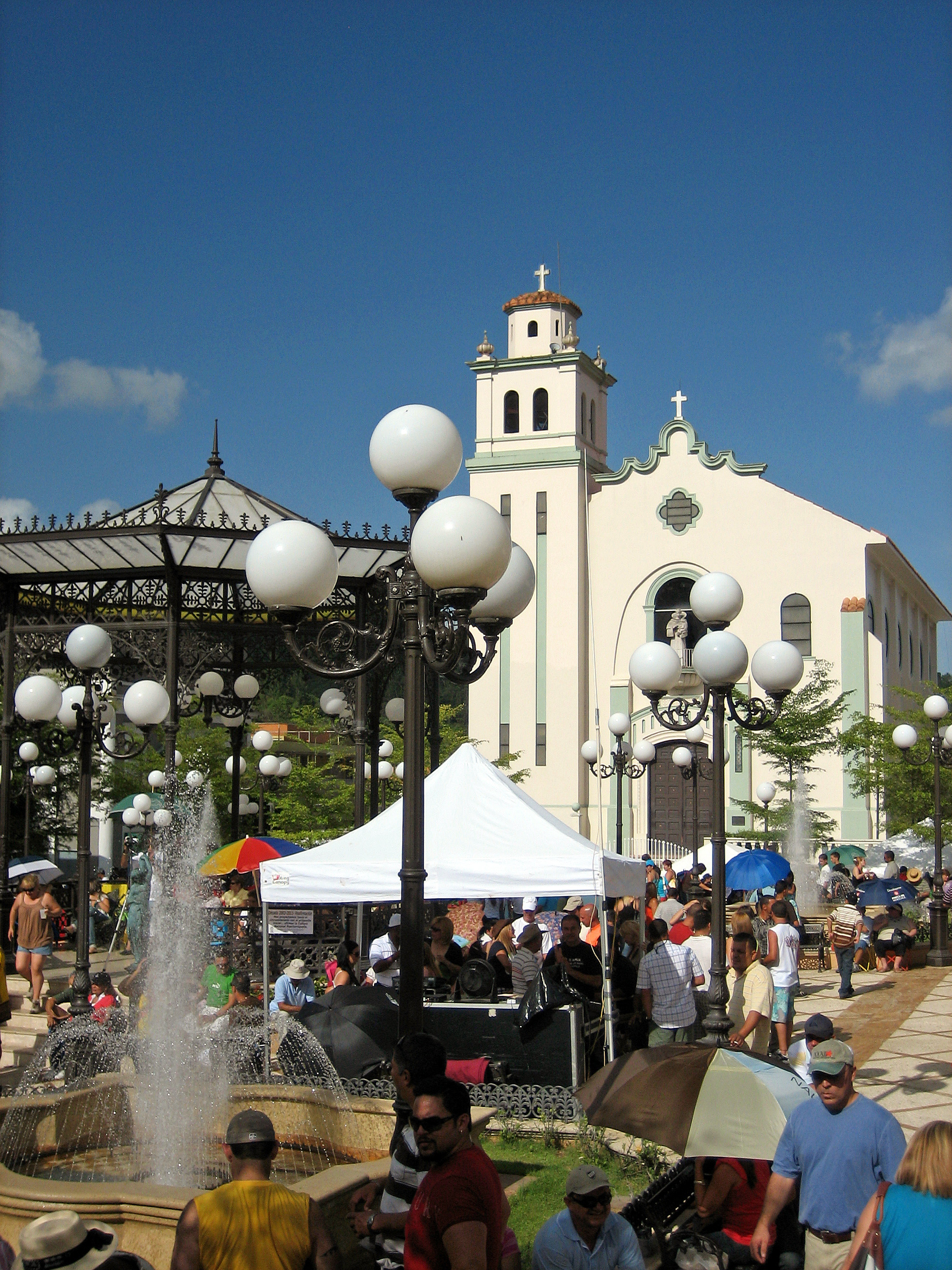
National Artisans Fair in the town's plaza in 2008

=== Festivals and events ===
Barranquitas celebrates its patron saint festival in June. The Fiestas Patronales de San Antonio de Padua is a religious and cultural celebration that generally features parades, games, artisans, amusement rides, regional food, and live entertainment.

Other festivals and events celebrated in Barranquitas include:

- Apio Festival or Festival del Apio – April/May
- National Crafts Fair of Barranquitas – July and has been celebrated for over 50 years
- Viva Mi Calle Festival – November
- Lighting of Christmas Tree – December

=== Sports ===
Barranquitas doesn't have professional sports teams, but there are some amateur sports teams based in the city. The most popular amateur sport is baseball. The team of Barranquitas is known as the "Proceres" (is an adjective for an important person in history) due to the fact that the town has been the birthplace for many historical figures. The other popular sport is volleyball.

== Economy ==
=== Agriculture ===
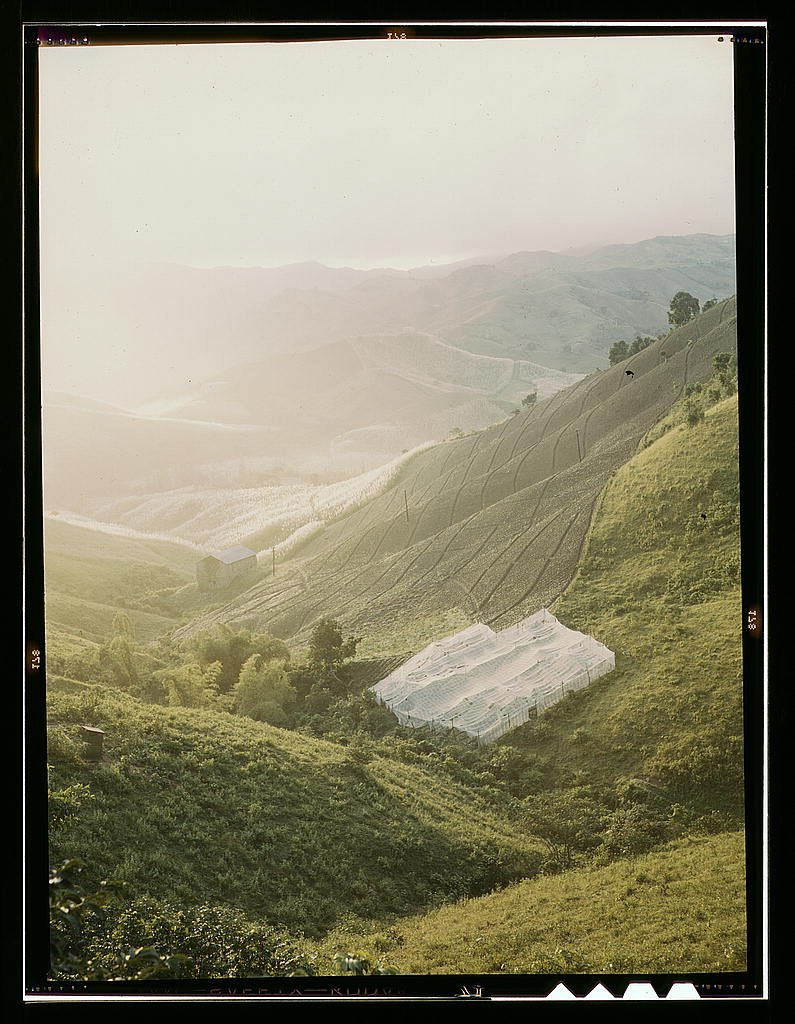
Tobacco growing in vicinity of Barranquitas, Puerto Rico (1941)

Some of the crops grown in Barranquitas include plantain, coffee, lemon, ají dulce, yam, and other fruits and vegetables. The main crop in Barranquitas is the apio. The apio is a root vegetable (from the legume Apios tuberosa / Apios Americana), and it is eaten like potatoes (not to be confused with celeriac).

=== Industry ===
Footwear and clothing is manufactured in Barranquitas.

== Demographics ==
Historical population
Census	Pop.	Note	%±
1900	8,103		—
1910	10,503		29.6%
1920	11,600		10.4%
1930	14,901		28.5%
1940	17,096		14.7%
1950	17,605		3.0%
1960	18,978		7.8%
1970	20,118		6.0%
1980	21,639		7.6%
1990	25,605		18.3%
2000	28,909		12.9%
2010	30,318		4.9%
2020	28,983		−4.4%
2025 (est.)	29,509	▲	1.8%
U.S. Decennial Census; 1899 (shown as 1900) 1910-1930; 1930-1950 1960-2000 2010 2020

In 2020, the population of Barranquitas was 28,983 with 99.9% self-identifying as Hispanic or Latino, the highest of all Puerto Rico's municipalities.

Many of the Puerto Ricans born in the town are known to have light-colored eyes and have strong European features. Some also have a mestizo look. The Taíno and European immigrants intermarried and created what is called mestizo. The reason for this was the migration of many Taíno Indians during the Spanish colonization. Taínos often fled to the mountainous region to escape slavery. Many Spanish and other European immigrants moved to this region and settled as coffee growers.

== Government ==
All municipalities in Puerto Rico are administered by a mayor, elected every four years. The current mayor of Barranquitas is Elliot Colón Blanco, of the New Progressive Party (PNP). He was first elected during a special election held on November 10, 2019, and has since been re-elected twice, most recently at the 2020 general elections.

The city belongs to the Puerto Rico Senatorial district VI, which is represented by two Senators. In 2024, Rafael Santos Ortiz and Wilmer Reyes Berríos were elected as District Senators.

== Symbols ==
The municipio has an official flag and coat of arms.

=== Flag ===
The flag of the municipality consists of three horizontal stripes; white on the upper edge representing the silver enamel of the town's shield, green in the center representing the vegetation and yellow on the lower edge representing the gold enamel of the ravines of the San Cristóbal Canyon.

=== Coat of arms ===
The coat of arms of Barranquitas has silver, a canyon, two ravines, gold slopes, a tree, gold leaves, a bell and a crown. The ravines are reminders of the San Cristóbal Canyon, located in the territorial boundary of Barranquitas and Aibonito, a neighboring municipality. The yagrumo trees are characteristic of the high mountainous areas of Puerto Rico and symbolize the elevation of Barranquitas.

== Education ==
The Interamerican University of Puerto Rico has a campus in Barranquitas.

All public schools in Puerto Rico are administered by the Puerto Rico Department of Education. The schools located in Barranquitas are the following: Many of the schools in Barranquitas educate children on agriculture and cultivating crops.

School	Level	Barrio	Public	Location(s)	Coords
Escuela La Torre	K-6	Cañabón	Yes	Carr 770 km 2 (mile marker 1.2) Hm 1 (yard marker 110) Sector La Torre	18.207048°N 66.338311°W
Escuela Cañabón Abajo	K-6	Barrancas	Yes	Carr 172	
Escuela Mana Abajo	K-6	Barrancas	Yes	Carr 771 km 9 (mile marker 5.6) Hm 2 (yard marker 220) Sector Mana Abajo	18.235955°N 66.306095°W
Escuela El Portón	K-6	Honduras	Yes	Carr 156 km 17 (mile marker 11) Hm 7 (yard marker 770) Sector El Portón	18.191368°N 66.306278°W
Escuela El Farallón	K-6	Quebradillas	Yes	Carr 152 km 7 (mile marker 4.3) Hm 6 (yard marker 660)	18.237845°N 66.293371°W
Escuela Sinforoso Aponte	K-6	Quebradillas	Yes	Carr 152 km 7 (mile marker 4.3) Hm 6 (yard marker 660)	18.212475°N 66.290946°W
Escuela Petroamérica Pagán	K-6	Pueblo	Yes	Calle Muñoz Rivera #14	18.186292°N 66.307554°W
Escuela La Vega (Stephen S. Huse)	K-6	Pueblo	Yes	Carr 771 km 0 (mile marker 0) Hm 3 (yard marker 330) Bda La Vega	18.190083°N 66.315011°W
Escuela S.U. Palo Hincado (Federico Degetau)	K-9	Palo Hincado	Yes	Carr 156 km 11 (mile marker 6.8) Hm 4 (yard marker 440)	18.189742°N 66.342675°W
Escuela S.U. La Loma (Antonio Vázquez Ramos)	K-9	Quebrada Grande	Yes	Carr 156 km 20 (mile marker 12) Hm 1 (yard marker 110)	18.184485°N 66.277771°W
Escuela S.U. Helechal	K-9	Helechal	Yes	Carr 162 km 7 (mile marker 4.3) Hm 4 (yard marker 440)	18.169233°N 66.314842°W
Escuela S.U. Lajitas (Ramon T Rivera)	K-9	Barrancas	Yes	Carr 771 km 5 (mile marker 3.1) Hm 4 (yard marker 440)	18.223767°N 66.31327°W
Escuela Pedro Laboy	7-9	Quebradillas	Yes	Carr 152 km 6 (mile marker 3.7) Hm 5 (yard marker 550)	18.23034°N 66.284873°W
Escuela José Berríos Berdecia	7-9	Pueblo	Yes	Calle Melitón Pereles	18.187759°N 66.309088°W
Escuela Pablo Colón Berdecia (Superior Vocational)	10-12	Pueblo	Yes	Calle Barcelo Final	18.186302°N 66.301289°W
Escuela Luis Muñoz Marín (Superior Commerce)	10-12	Quebradillas	Yes	Calle A Sector Nuevo	18.191551°N 66.307908°W
San Francisco de Asís School	K-9	Helechal	No	Carr 719 km 2 (mile marker 1.2) Hm 5 (yard marker 550) Sector Hoya Honda	18.168068°N 66.30937°W

== See also ==
- List of Puerto Ricans
- History of Puerto Rico
