= Luis Muñoz Rivera =

Puerto Rican politician

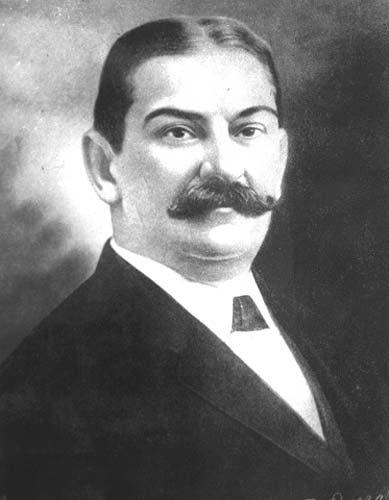

Resident Commissioner of Puerto Rico
- In office March 4, 1911 – November 15, 1916
- Preceded by: Tulio Larrínaga
- Succeeded by: Félix Córdova Dávila

Personal details
- Born: July 17, 1859 Barranquitas, Captaincy General of Puerto Rico
- Died: November 15, 1916 (aged 57) San Juan, Puerto Rico
- Resting place: Muñoz Rivera Family Mausoleum in Barranquitas, Puerto Rico
- Party: Liberal Reformist (Before 1904); Unionist (1904–1916)
- Spouse: Amalia Marín Castilla
- Children: Luis Muñoz Marín

Luis Muñoz Rivera (July 17, 1859 – November 15, 1916) was a Puerto Rican poet, journalist and politician. He was a major figure in the struggle for political autonomy of Puerto Rico in union with Spain.

In 1887, Muñoz Rivera became part of the leadership of a newly formed Autonomist Party. In 1889, he successfully ran a campaign for the position of delegate in the district of Caguas. Subsequently, Muñoz Rivera was a member of a group organized by the party to discuss proposals of autonomy with Práxedes Mateo Sagasta, who would grant Puerto Rico an autonomous government following his election. He served as Chief of the Cabinet of this government.

On August 13, 1898, the Treaty of Paris transferred possession of Puerto Rico from Spain to the United States and a military government was established. In 1899, Muñoz Rivera resigned his position within the cabinet and remained inactive in politics for some time. In 1909, he was elected as Resident Commissioner of Puerto Rico and participated in the creation of the Jones-Shafroth Act, proposing amendments before its final approval. Shortly after, Muñoz Rivera contracted an infection and traveled to Puerto Rico, where he died on November 15, 1916. His son, Luis Muñoz Marín would subsequently become involved in politics, becoming the first democratically elected Governor of Puerto Rico.

== Early life ==
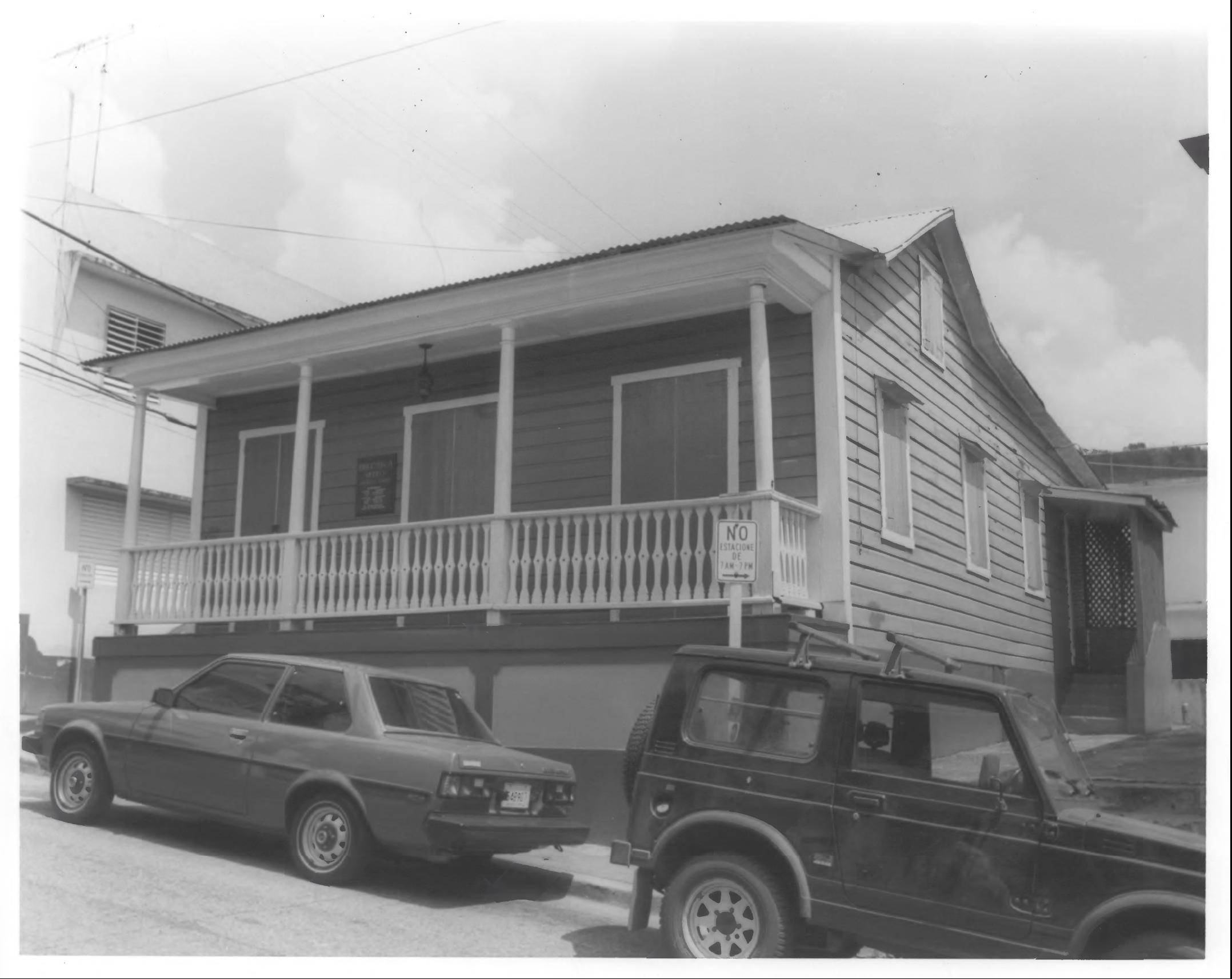
Birthplace of Luis Muñoz Rivera, National Register of Historic Places

Luis Muñoz Rivera was born in Barranquitas, Puerto Rico, to Luis Muñoz Barrios and Monserrate Rivera Vazquez. He was the couple's first child and a banquet was offered in celebration. He came from a middle-class family and was not part of Puerto Rico's elite. His father came from one of the first patriarchal lines in Puerto Rico's politics.

His paternal grandfather Luis Muñoz Iglesias was from Castile in central Spain who decided to make his career in the army and received several recognitions after participating against Simón Bolívar during the Admirable Campaign, and followed his commanding officer Miguel de la Torre to Puerto Rico. He settled in a 400-acre (1.6 km^{2}) farm in Cidra, Puerto Rico, married María Escolástica Barrios and fathered twelve children. He became the town's first mayor from 1818 to 1820 and again in 1840 to 1850.

During Muñoz Rivera's childhood, Barranquitas was a small rural town. The family's house was moderately large for the time; it was built with wood and its roof was made with zinc. When he was four, his mother home-schooled him with books from a private library owned by his father. By the age of ten, Muñoz Rivera completed the education offered in the town's school, and finished first in his class. He was educated in Spanish and French, and took music classes with Jorge Colombani. His father hired private tutors to continue his instruction. Muñoz Rivera was a serious student with a strong interest in Miguel de Cervantes' works, in particular Don Quixote. Other authors that he studied include Fernando de Herrera, Tirso de Molina, Luis de Góngora, and Lope de Vega.

When Muñoz Rivera was twelve years old, his mother fell ill and died. By this time, the family had grown to include nine more siblings, whom he taught. By the age of fourteen, Muñoz Rivera was managing legal documents, working with the local church clergy, and helping in his father's store. There were no institutions of higher learning on the island at that time, and most families sent their children to Cuba (University of la Habana, founded in 1728), Spain or North America to complete their university education. Muñoz Rivera wanted to travel to Spain and study law, but his father wanted him to take care of the family's business.

== Political career ==
=== Early involvement in politics and poetry ===
Early in his life, Muñoz Rivera began writing poetry. However, he did not publish any of his work until he was 23 years old. In 1882, Mario Braschi, an editor working for a newspaper named El Pueblo, accepted to publish a poem titled ¡Adelante!. Braschi advised Muñoz Rivera to continue writing, urging him to concentrate on science and politics, instead of authoring love poems. Muñoz Rivera then began writing about Puerto Rico's political status, promoting the necessity of an autonomous government.

Even though his father was a member of the Conservative Party, Muñoz Rivera decided to follow his uncle, Vicente Muñoz Barrios ideals and in 1883 joined the Liberal Party. While working within the organization, Muñoz Rivera established a store along Quintín Negrón Sanjurjo, which had limited success. He gained the confidence of the Liberal Party and was named president of Barranquitas' committee and became a member of the municipal council. In 1885, Muñoz Rivera ran for a position in the Juana Diaz district's representation in the Provincial Assembly, but he was not elected. That same year, he began publishing his writings in newspapers and magazines, including El Clamor del Pueblo, La Revista de Puerto Rico and El Pueblo. Other poems published by Muñoz Rivera were: Retamas, Tropicales, Horas de Fiebre, El paso del déspota, Minha terra, Cuba rebelde, A cualquier compatriota, Las campanas, Turba multa, Alea jacta est, Judas, El general, Abismos, Patriota, Himno, Parias and Poemas Liricos.

=== Establishing an autonomous government ===
In January 1887, members of the Liberal Party organized a convention in Coamo where they discussed the reorganization of the party. In this activity he met Román Baldorioty de Castro, who became his mentor, regarding Muñoz Rivera as a "disciple". A new party called the Autonomist Party was created following this reunion, which also included José Celso Barbosa and José de Diego. The organization's ideology pursued the creation of a separate government for Puerto Rico, while keeping some relationship with Spain.

The Autonomist Party's base grew rapidly, in part due to Muñoz Rivera's writings and speeches directed toward the jíbaro population. The Conservative Party considered this a threat and closed the newspapers where he published his work, sending part of their staff to jail in Fort San Felipe del Morro. After Francisco Cepeda Taborcias, editor of La Revista de Puerto Rico's was jailed, the position was offered to Muñoz Rivera, who accepted it. After being released from prison, Cepeda criticized Baldorioty de Castro's policies. Cepeda was elected secretary of the party and Baldorioty de Castro was named honorary president. This action angered Muñoz Rivera, who challenged him to a duel. Cepeda originally accepted the challenge, but later declined the same once the preparations were underway, losing his position within the party's hierarchy.

As 1887 progressed, the conflicts between liberals and conservatives worsened, with governor Palacio ordering the arrest of more than a hundred liberals. The political tension increased and the year became known as "The Terrible Year". Palavio also prohibited any person from leaving Puerto Rico with the intention of preventing any actions from Spain. However, the liberals were able to send Juan Arrillaga Roque to Madrid, where he made the situation public. Upon learning of this, Alfonso XII replaced Palacio with Juan Contreras Martinez. In 1889, Muñoz Rivera was nominated as the Liberal Party's delegate for the district of Juana Diaz. However, his father was nominated for the same position by the Conservative Party and he moved his nomination to the district of Caguas out of respect. He won the election, which was admitted with the conservatives' opposition.

On July 1, 1890, he founded the party's newspaper, La Democracía, in Ponce, Puerto Rico. The publication was mostly directed towards politics, but it also included poetry and stories published by Puerto Rican artists. The newspaper brought immediate controversy, which eventually led to Muñoz Rivera's arrest. Protest were organized throughout Puerto Rico and he was released after his father paid 15,000 pesetas as bond. Muñoz Rivera sold his half of the store, in order to raise funds for the publication's establishment.

In 1893, he married Amalia Marín in a ceremony that took place in Ponce Cathedral. Later that year, he traveled to Spain to learn about its political system. There he realized that Práxedes Mateo Sagasta, president of the Fusion Party, was the better option to help in this task. While in Spain, Muñoz Rivera received notice that his father had died, which heavily affected him. Upon returning to Puerto Rico, he published an article about his father in La Democracia. He subsequently noticed that his travel had caused controversy within the Autonomist Party, which became divided between followers of Barbosa and Muñoz Rivera, with the two factions becoming known as Muñocistas and Barbosistas.

Barbosa's group opposed allying with Sagasta, claiming that he was a monarchist while they were supporting the establishment of a republic. Meanwhile, Muñoz Rivera participated in the writing of the Plan de Ponce which proposed administrative autonomy for the island. After several debates, the Autonomist Party agreed to send four men to reunite with Libera Fusion Party in the organization's behalf, including Muñoz Rivera. Sagasta proposed that if he won the premiership of Spain, Puerto Rico would receive a Chapter of Autonomy which would give it the same degree of sovereignty that the Spanish provinces had. Upon learning of this, most of the Barbosistas resigned, forming a new institution named the Orthodox Autonomist Party. Sagasta became Spain's prime minister following the power vacuum that occurred after the assassination of Antonio Cánovas del Castillo, and in December 1897 he granted the promised autonomous government. Muñoz Rivera changed the party's name to Liberal Party of Puerto Rico and served as Secretary of Grace, Justice and Government and Chief of the Cabinet for the independent government of Puerto Rico.

=== American invasion and military government ===
On February 18, 1898, Muñoz Rivera's son, Luis Muñoz Marín, was born. By this time the family had moved to Old San Juan, where Luis was born. On February 16, 1898, Barbosa rushed to Muñoz Rivera's home. He had just learned that the American vessel USS Maine had sunk off the coast of Cuba, which would most likely spark a war between Spain and the United States. Barbosa expected the American government to grant Puerto Rico autonomy if they gained control. However, Muñoz Rivera was saddened by the news, knowing that the United States was planning to build a canal in Panama, and that Puerto Rico would be a strategic location to protect the structure. Barbosa insisted that this would not happen, continuing his support towards a military operation.

On May 12, 1898, the United States Navy bombarded San Juan, initiating the Puerto Rican Campaign. Initially, the Liberal Party supported the Spanish government, although several members agreed with Barbosa. Muñoz Rivera took possession of Chief of the Cabinet's position for the Autonomous Government on July 21. Four days later, on July 25, the United States Army landed in Guánica led by Nelson A. Miles, beginning the land offensive. On August 13, the signing of the Treaty of Paris was made public, bringing a halt to all military offensives in Puerto Rico. As part of this amnesty, Spain ceded Cuba and Puerto Rico, converting the archipelago into a possession of the United States under military governorship. The Barbosistas welcomed the American government, but Muñoz Rivera expected them to keep Puerto Rico as a possession. He refused to cooperate with the military government and returned to Barranquitas, where he wrote a poem titled Sísifo, comparing Puerto Rico's political situation to Sisyphus' punishment. He subsequently returned to San Juan, accepting a request made by John R. Brooke to continue in his office within the new cabinet. Muñoz Rivera assisted in establishing an insular police. Brooke was replaced by Guy Vernon Henry as military governor. Following this change, both men began having violent discussions, with each one trying to push their positions. Muñoz Rivera would vocally debate several of Brooke's decisions, with both communicating via an interpreter.

On February 4, 1899, he resigned from the position of president of the Council of Secretaries. Puerto Rico was experiencing a serious economic crisis, many problems arising from the population's inability to communicate with the Americans. Universal election suffrage was canceled, reducing the voting population by more than 85%. Henry eventually dissolved the Cabinet, removing the final remnants of recognition of the autonomous government established under Spanish rule. Muñoz Rivera opposed the military structure and promoted autonomy. Later that year, he founded the newspaper El Territorio, which voiced the concerns of landowners that were being affected by a blockade imposed by the United States. On April 12, 1900, William McKinley signed the Foraker Act, which proposed the end of the military government and the establishment of a civil government. A Supreme Court was created with five members, all of which were American functionaries appointed by the United States President. The position of Resident Commissioner of Puerto Rico was also enacted. The Barbosistas considered this law an advance, eventually creating a new institution named the Republican Party of Puerto Rico. Muñoz Rivera published heavy criticism towards them in El Diario, which angered the members of the new organization. Rumors of an assassination attempt became widespread, and several of his friends visited his house armed. A discussion between both sides concluded with gunfire, leaving no one injured, some of the perpetrators escaped. Muñoz Rivera and those present were arrested and charged with "armed assault", but the charge was dropped when he established that he acted in self-defense. The Foraker act failed to prevent the monopolization of land, and allowed four American corporations to control of most of Puerto Rico's agricultural terrains.

== Last years and death ==
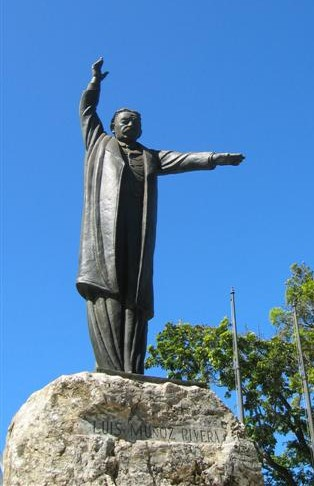
Statue of Luis Muñoz Rivera, located at a park which bears his name.

The United States eventually designed a program to "Americanize" Puerto Rico. One day while working for an article in El Diario, a friend of Muñoz Rivera brought a newspaper informing that all education in Puerto Rican public schools would be taught in English. He was surprised by the announcement, expressing that the plan would fail due to lack of teachers with knowledge in the language. Muñoz Rivera began publishing articles directed towards the jíbaro population, in which he promoted self-government for Puerto Rico.

In 1901, a group of statehood supporters broke into the El Diario's building, vandalizing most of the equipment. Following this incident, the family moved to Caguas where he reopened La Democracia. After receiving further threats from the statehood movements, Muñoz Rivera decided to move to New York City, not before leaving the paper's editing in charge of one of his followers. There he founded the bilingual newspaper Puerto Rico Herald, in which he heavily criticized the United States' stance on Puerto Rico. During the following years, the family constantly traveled between both locations. Muñoz Rivera, together with Rosendo Matienzo Cintrón, Antonio R. Barceló, José de Diego and Juan Vías Ochoteco founded the Union of Puerto Rico party, which won the election in 1904. Following the party's victory, he was selected as a member the House of Delegates.

In 1910, Muñoz Rivera ran for Resident Commissioner in the United States House of Representatives representing the Union of Puerto Rico party, and served from 1911 to 1916. After spending nearly a year perfecting his English, Muñoz Rivera began forming friendships with some congressmen. Among these were Henry L. Stimpson and Felix Frankfurter. In 1915 Muñoz Rivera proposed granting Puerto Rico greater autonomy without requesting independence from the United States, and equal rights without becoming a state. His proposal was greeted by opposition from many members of his party including José de Diego. Still in the end, his party agreed on his proposal.

On March 2, 1917, the Jones-Shafroth Act was signed, granting United States citizenship to Puerto Ricans and creating a bicameral Legislative Assembly. Still, he was not pleased with the Jones Act since the judicial and executive branches were still controlled by the United States. On March 16, 1916, he gave a speech in the house floor that seemed to argue in favor and against American citizenship. He declared that if the earth were to swallow the island, Puerto Ricans would prefer American citizenship to any citizenship in the world. But as long as the island existed, the residents preferred Puerto Rican citizenship.

Shortly afterwards, he became ill and returned to Puerto Rico to recuperate. In late 1916, Eduardo Georgetti, a friend of the family, summoned his wife and son to Puerto Rico and informed them that he was suffering from an infection that had begun in the galbladder, before expanding throughout his body. Luis Muñoz Rivera died on November 15, 1916, in the town of San Juan, before the Jones Act was enacted into law. When he died, the town's bells were tolled and La Borinqueña was sung by those present. The funeral procession began five days after his death It traveled throughout Puerto Rico and was attended by thousands of people along the way. Some Jíbaros traveled between municipalities to attend more than one part of the activity. Muñoz' remains were buried at the Muñoz Rivera Family Mausoleum in Barranquitas, Puerto Rico.

== Legacy and honors ==
- Muñoz Rivera's son, Luis Muñoz Marín, also became an important figure in politics, taking part in the founding of the Popular Democratic Party of Puerto Rico. He was elected in 1948 as the first democratically elected Governor of Puerto Rico.
- In 1923, the municipality of Ponce erected a statue in honor of Munoz Rivera and renamed the northern plaza of the city's main square Plaza Muñoz Rivera for him.
- Sixteen Puerto Rican schools were named for Muñoz.

== See also ==
- History of Puerto Rico
- List of Puerto Ricans
- Luis Muñoz Rivera Park
- Politics of Puerto Rico
- List of Hispanic Americans in the United States Congress
- List of members of the United States Congress who died in office (1900–1949)
- Luis Muñoz Rivera (Ponce statue)

U.S. House of Representatives
Preceded by Tulio Larrínaga	Resident Commissioner of Puerto Rico; 1911–1916	Succeeded by Félix Córdova Dávila
