= Barrancas, Barranquitas, Puerto Rico =

Barrio of Puerto Rico

Barrancas
- Barrio
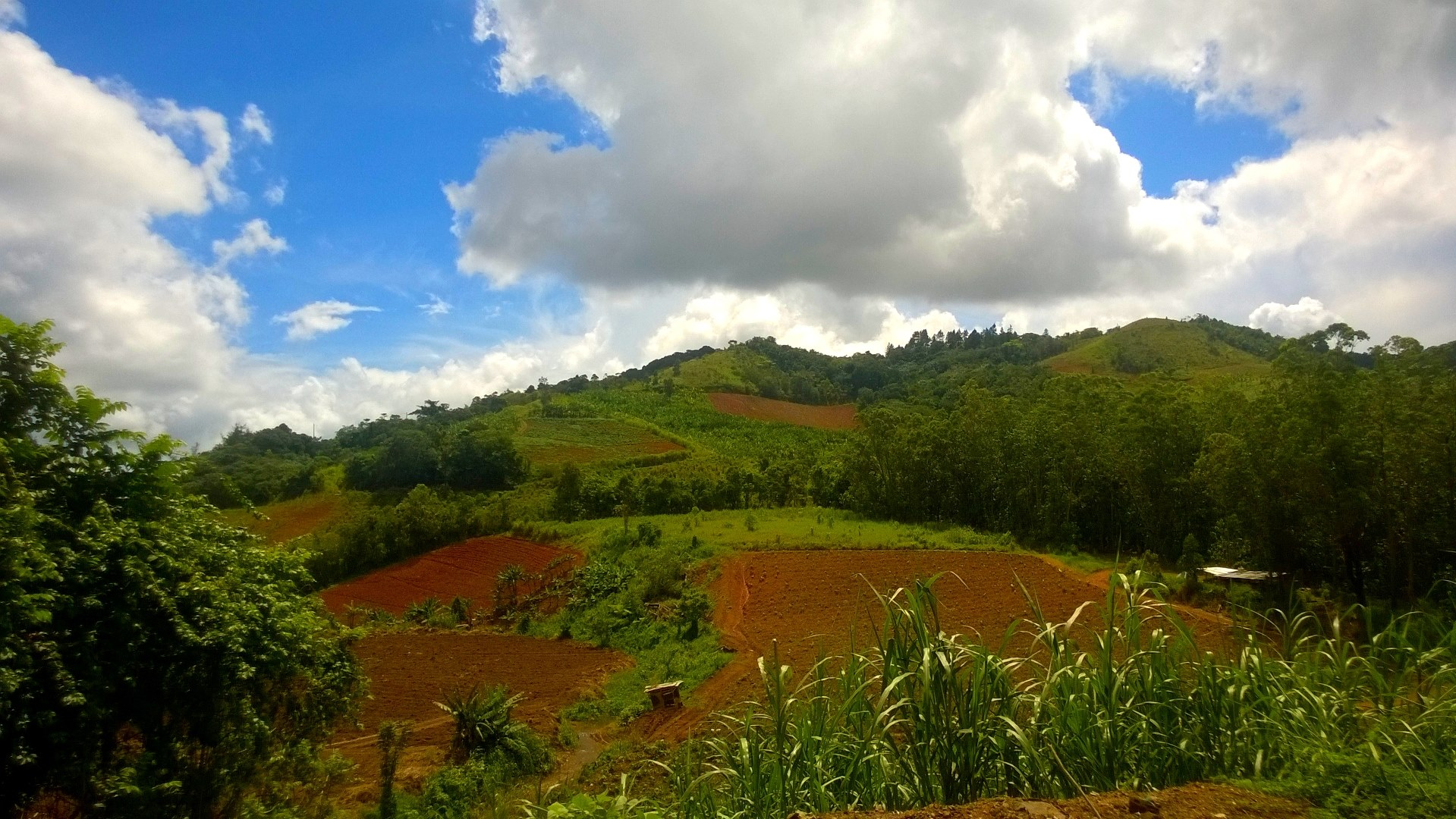
- Mountains in Barrancas

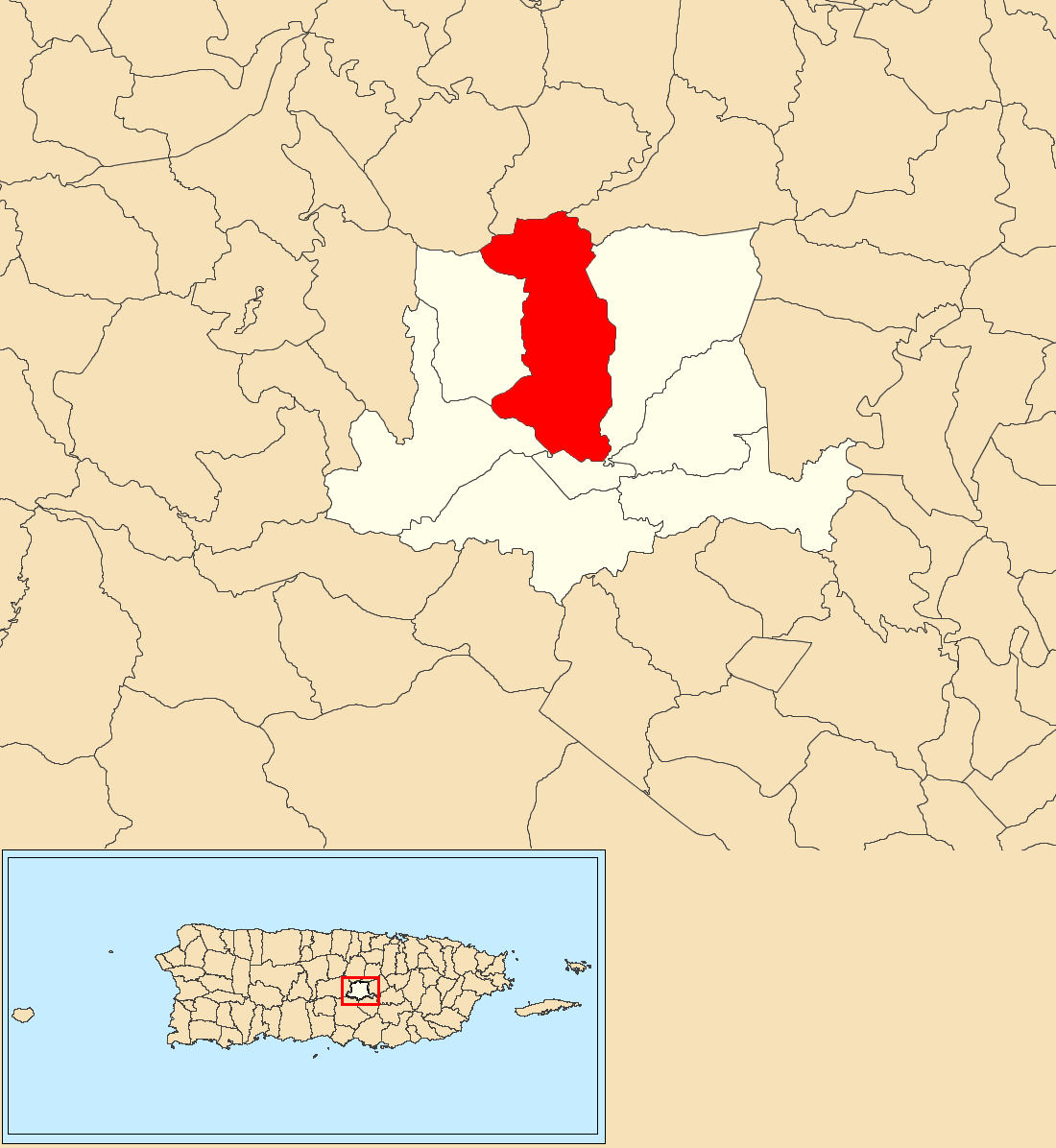
- Location of Barrancas within the municipality of Barranquitas shown in red

- Location of Puerto Rico
- Coordinates: 18°13′08″N 66°18′57″W
- Commonwealth: Puerto Rico
- Municipality: Barranquitas

Area
  - Total: 5.73 sq mi (14.8 km^{2})
  - Land: 5.73 sq mi (14.8 km^{2})
  - Water: 0.00 sq mi (0 km^{2})
- Elevation: 2,155 ft (657 m)

Population (2010)
  - Total: 5,234
  - Density: 334.7/sq mi (129.2/km^{2})
- Source: 2010 Census
- Time zone: UTC−4 (AST)
- ZIP Code: 00794
- Area code: 787/939

Barrancas is a barrio in the municipality of Barranquitas, Puerto Rico. Its population in 2010 was 5,234.

== History ==
Barrancas was in Spain's gazetteers until Puerto Rico was ceded by Spain in the aftermath of the Spanish–American War under the terms of the Treaty of Paris of 1898 and became an unincorporated territory of the United States. In 1899, the United States Department of War conducted a census of Puerto Rico finding that the population of Barrancas barrio was 692.

Historical population
Census	Pop.	Note	%±
1900	692		—
1910	1,462		111.3%
1920	1,512		3.4%
1930	1,740		15.1%
1940	2,654		52.5%
1950	2,012		−24.2%
1960	2,514		25.0%
1970	2,319		−7.8%
1980	3,084		33.0%
1990	4,307		39.7%
2000	5,083		18.0%
2010	5,234		3.0%
U.S. Decennial Census; 1899 (shown as 1900) 1910-1930; 1930-1950 1980-2000 2010

== See also ==
- List of communities in Puerto Rico
