= Honduras, Barranquitas, Puerto Rico =

Barrio of Puerto Rico

Honduras
- Barrio
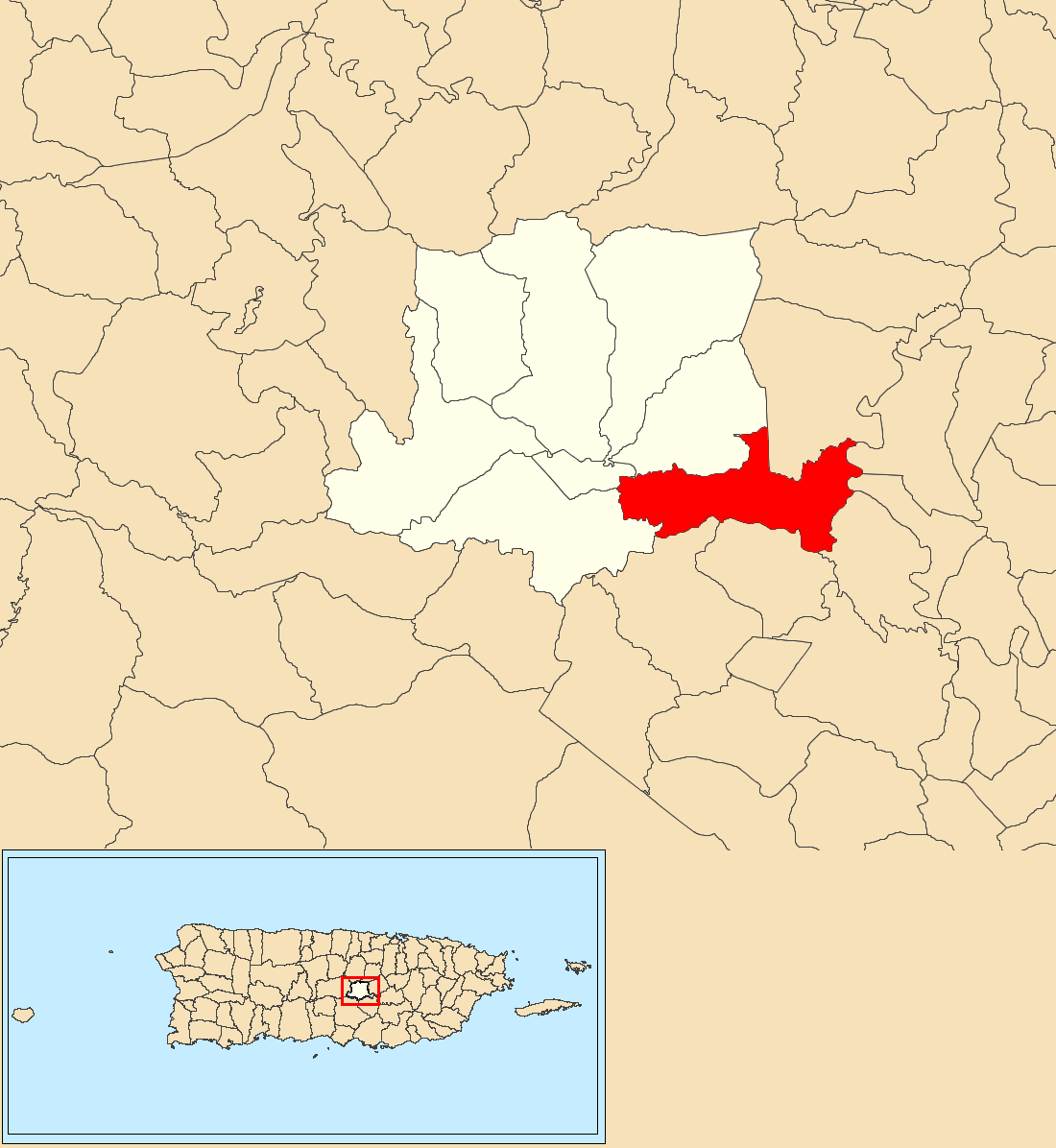
- Location of Honduras within the municipality of Barranquitas shown in red

- Location of Puerto Rico
- Coordinates: 18°10′46″N 66°15′44″W
- Commonwealth: Puerto Rico
- Municipality: Barranquitas

Area
  - Total: 4.00 sq mi (10.4 km^{2})
  - Land: 3.97 sq mi (10.3 km^{2})
  - Water: 0.03 sq mi (0.078 km^{2})
- Elevation: 1,627 ft (496 m)

Population (2010)
  - Total: 1,823
  - Density: 177.8/sq mi (68.6/km^{2})
- Source: 2010 Census
- Time zone: UTC−4 (AST)
- ZIP Code: 00794
- Area code: 787/939

Honduras is a barrio in the municipality of Barranquitas, Puerto Rico. Its population in 2010 was 1,823.

== History ==
Honduras was in Spain's gazetteers until Puerto Rico was ceded by Spain in the aftermath of the Spanish–American War under the terms of the Treaty of Paris of 1898 and became an unincorporated territory of the United States. In 1899, the United States Department of War conducted a census of Puerto Rico finding that the population of Honduras barrio was 862.

Historical population
Census	Pop.	Note	%±
1900	862		—
1910	1,304		51.3%
1920	1,602		22.9%
1930	2,057		28.4%
1940	1,651		−19.7%
1950	1,445		−12.5%
1960	1,134		−21.5%
1970	1,256		10.8%
1980	1,139		−9.3%
1990	2,191		92.4%
2000	2,155		−1.6%
2010	1,823		−15.4%
U.S. Decennial Census; 1899 (shown as 1900) 1910-1930; 1930-1950 1980-2000 2010

== See also ==
- List of communities in Puerto Rico
