= Palo Hincado, Barranquitas, Puerto Rico =

Barrio of Puerto Rico

Palo Hincado
- Barrio
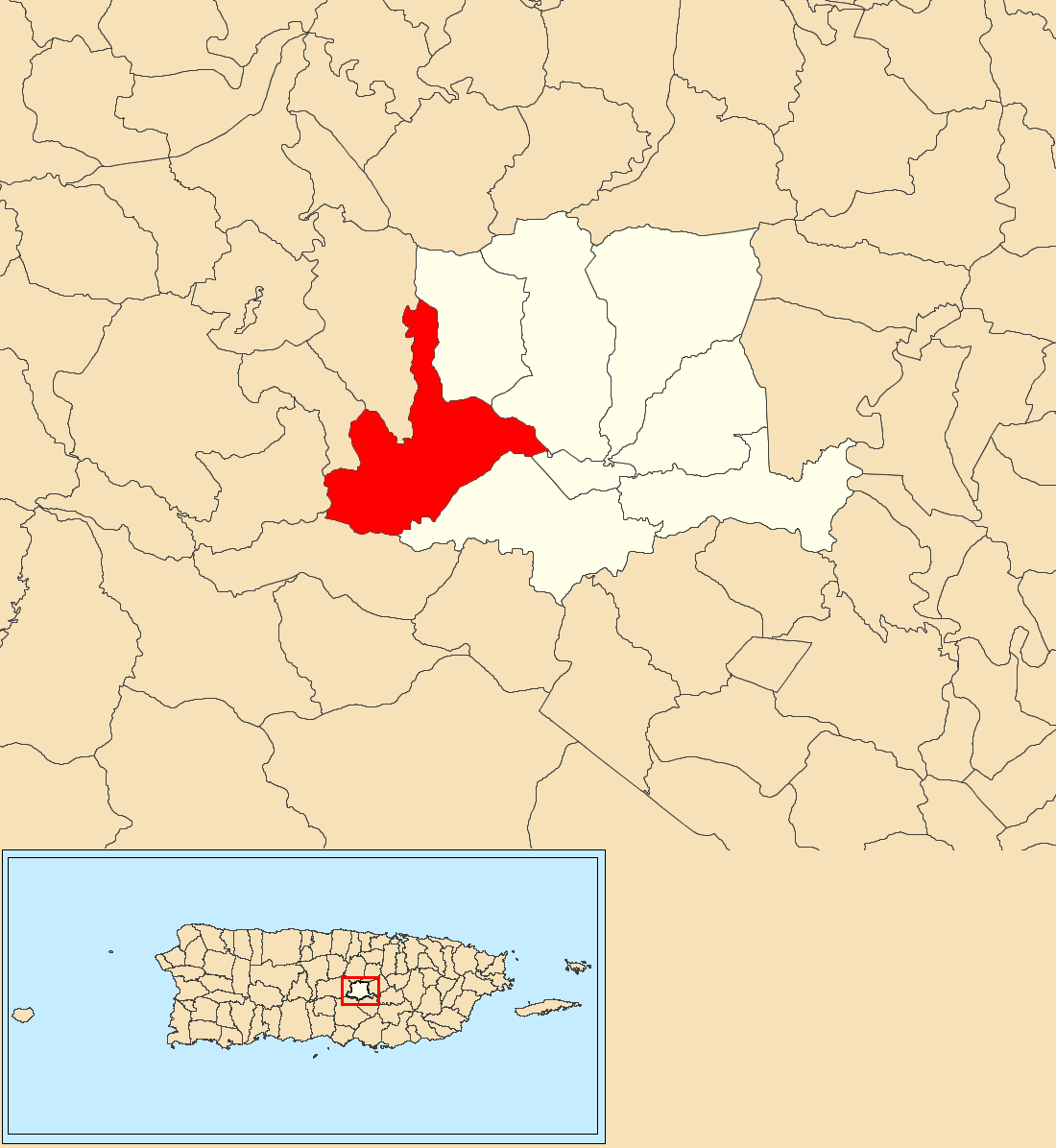
- Location of Palo Hincado within the municipality of Barranquitas shown in red

- Location of Puerto Rico
- Coordinates: 18°11′27″N 66°20′59″W
- Commonwealth: Puerto Rico
- Municipality: Barranquitas

Area
  - Total: 5.44 sq mi (14.1 km^{2})
  - Land: 5.44 sq mi (14.1 km^{2})
  - Water: 0.00 sq mi (0 km^{2})
- Elevation: 2,123 ft (647 m)

Population (2010)
  - Total: 4,587
  - Density: 323.7/sq mi (125.0/km^{2})
- Source: 2010 Census
- Time zone: UTC−4 (AST)
- ZIP Code: 00794
- Area code: 787/939

Palo Hincado is a barrio in the municipality of Barranquitas, Puerto Rico. Its population in 2010 was 4,587.

== History ==
Palo Hincado was in Spain's gazetteers until Puerto Rico was ceded by Spain in the aftermath of the Spanish–American War under the terms of the Treaty of Paris of 1898 and became an unincorporated territory of the United States. In 1899, the United States Department of War conducted a census of Puerto Rico finding that the population of Palo Hincado barrio was 1,299.

Palo Hincado may have been the home of Taíno chief Orocobix in the early 16th century.

Historical population
Census	Pop.	Note	%±
1900	1,299		—
1910	1,530		17.8%
1920	1,585		3.6%
1930	1,922		21.3%
1940	2,843		47.9%
1950	2,911		2.4%
1960	2,696		−7.4%
1970	2,991		10.9%
1980	3,229		8.0%
1990	3,669		13.6%
2000	3,963		8.0%
2010	4,587		15.7%
U.S. Decennial Census; 1899 (shown as 1900) 1910-1930; 1930-1950 1980-2000 2010

== See also ==
- List of communities in Puerto Rico
