= Yagrumo =

Yagrumo is a South American term for some unrelated rainforest trees with palmate leaves:

- Cecropia (pumpwoods, belonging to the rosids), also called yagrumo hembra ("female yagrumo") or yagrumo
- Didymopanax morototoni (umbrella trees, belonging to the asterids), also called yagrumo macho ("male yagrumo")
