= First government of Luis Muñoz Marín =

First fully autonomous cabinet of the Puerto Rican government

First Government of Luis Muñoz Marín
- 1st Elected and Constitutional Government of Puerto Rico
- 1949-1953
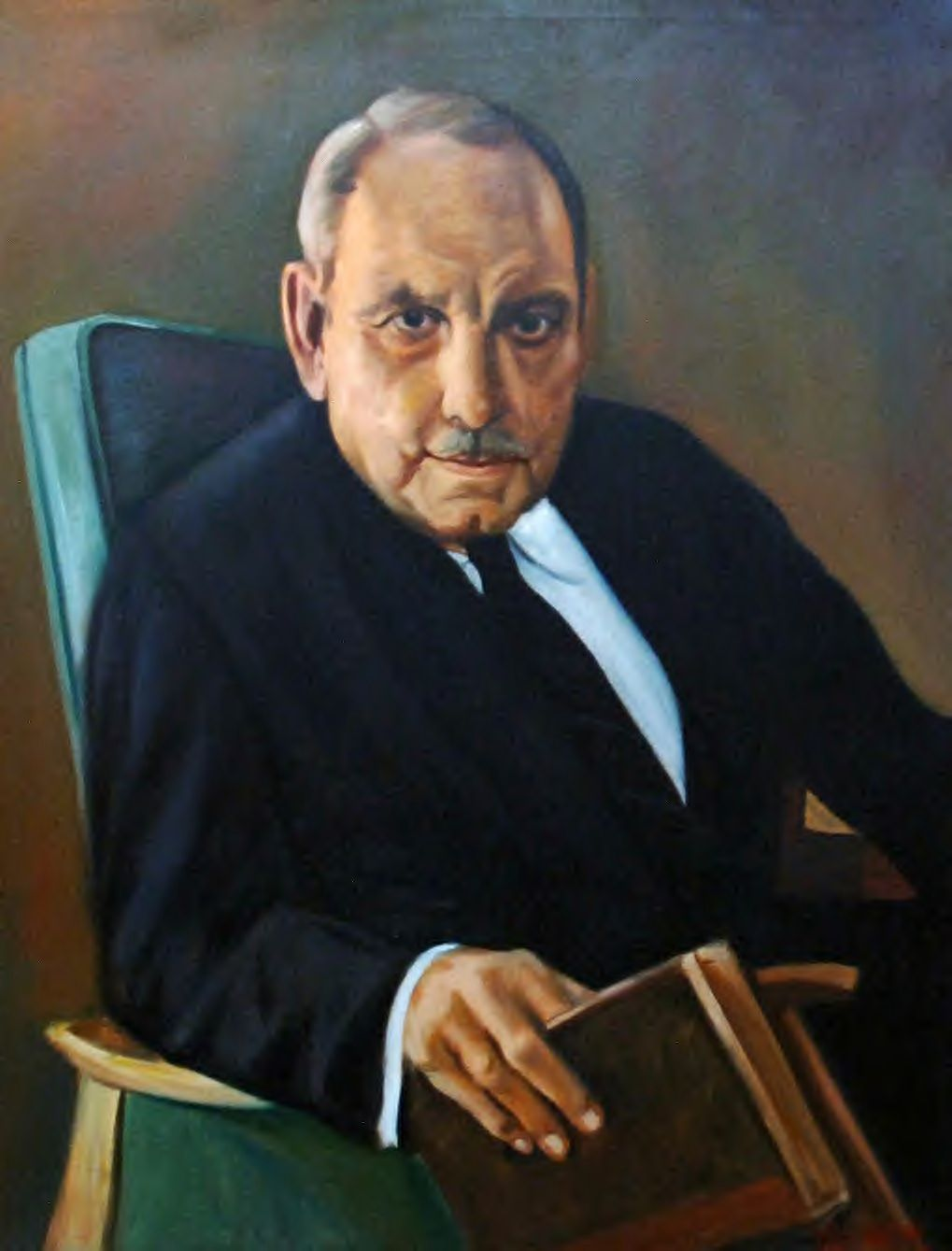
- Governor Muñoz Marín.
- Date formed: 2 January 1949
- Date dissolved: 2 January 1953

People and organisations
- President of the United States of America: Harry S. Truman
- Governor: Luis Muñoz Marín
- Attorney General (until 1952) Secretary of State (1952-present): Vicente Geigel Polanco (Note: Under the Jones-Shaffroth Act as amended, the successor to the governor in this case was the Attorney General as stated in Article 24.) Roberto Sánchez Vilella (from 1952)
- Total no. of members: 7 Secretaries (Note: Does not include the Governor.); 7 Cabinet Members
- Member party: PPD Ind.
- Status in legislature: Supermajority in both chambers Senate 17 / 18 (94%) House of Representatives 38 / 39 (97%)
- Opposition parties: PEP-PRP-PS Coalition; PIP (extra-parliamentary)
- Opposition leaders: Martín Travieso (leader of the Coalition) Gilberto Concepción de Gracia (PIP)

History
- Election: 1948 Puerto Rican general election
- Outgoing election: 1952 Puerto Rican general election
- Legislature term: 1st Legislative Assembly of Puerto Rico
- Budgets: 1949 Puerto Rico Budget; 1950 Puerto Rico Budget; 1951 Puerto Rico Budget; 1952 Puerto Rico Budget
- Advice and consent: Senate of Puerto Rico; House of Representatives of Puerto Rico (Note: The House provides advice and consent for the Secretary of State, as he is first in line in the Puerto Rico governor' order of succession as established in Article IV, Section 5 of the Constitution of Puerto Rico (1952))
- Incoming formation: Elective Governor Act of 1947 and 1948 Puerto Rican general election
- Predecessor: Government of Jesús Piñero Jiménez
- Successor: Second government of Luis Muñoz Marín

The government of Governor of Puerto Rico Luis Muñoz Marín was that of the first elected governor. In addition to that, it was the first whose cabinet did not receive the advice and consent of the United States Senate, but from the Puerto Rico Senate. This all came as part of the 1947 Puerto Rico Elective Governor Act. During this government, the Puerto Rican people addressed via Puerto Rico Federal Relations Act of 1950's mechanism the creation of their own constitution, which was ratified and enacted in the latter months of the Muñoz Marín government, which reconfigured the system of government by creating the Puerto Rico Council of Secretaries and enlarged the Legislative Assembly's chambers. The Commonwealth of Puerto Rico was established, and the 1952 Commonwealth Constitution is, with some amendments, the current constitution of the archipelago.

== Party breakdown ==
Party breakdown of cabinet members, not including the governor:

- Popular Democratic Party
- Independents
4
2

The cabinet was composed of members of the PPD and two independents or technical positions (or people whose membership in a party was not clearly ascertained from any available media).

After the Constitution got adopted in July 1952, this balance changed to:

- Popular Democratic Party
- Independents
5
2

== Members of the Initial Cabinet ==
The Puerto Rican Cabinet was led by the Governor alone in this period. The Cabinet was composed of all the heads of the executive departments of the insular government. A feature of this government is a reshuffle and recomposition of the Cabinet with the introduction of the Constitution of Puerto Rico in July 1952. This involved changing names of offices, and a transition to the fully constitutional government of the Commonwealth.

Office	Name	Party	Term
=== Governor ===
Governor of Puerto Rico; Gobernación de Puerto Rico	Luis Muñoz Marín	Popular Democratic Party	2 January 1949 – 2 January 1965
=== Secretaries and Commissioners ===
Secretary of Agriculture and Commerce; Secretaría de Agricultura y Comercio	Ramón Colón Torres	Popular Democratic Party	2 January 1949 - 24 July 1952
Attorney General; Procuradoría General	Vicente Geigel Polanco	Popular Democratic Party	2 January 1949 - 1 February 1951
Attorney General; Procuradoría General	Víctor Gutiérrez Franqui	Popular Democratic Party	7 February 1951 - 24 July 1952
Secretary of the Treasury; Secretaría de Hacienda	Sol Luis Descartes Andreu	Popular Democratic Party	2 January 1949 - 24 July 1952
Commissioner of Public Instruction; Comisaría de Instrucción Pública	Mariano Villaronga Toro	Ind.	2 January 1949 - 24 July 1952
Commissioner of Health; Comisaría de Salud	Juan A. Pons	Ind.	1946 - 24 July 1952
Commissioner of Labor; Comisaría del Trabajo	Fernando Sierra Berdecía	Popular Democratic Party	1947 - 24 July 1952

== Constitutional Cabinet ==
The new cabinet is a continuation of the old, although positions were changed, split, or reshuffled with the new constitutional order.

Office	Name	Party	Term
=== Governor ===
Governor of Puerto Rico; Gobernación de Puerto Rico	Luis Muñoz Marín	Popular Democratic Party	24 July 1952 – 2 January 1965
=== Council of Secretaries ===
Secretary of State; Secretaría de Estado	Roberto Sánchez Vilella	Popular Democratic Party	25 July 1952 - 2 January 1965
Secretary of Agriculture, Commerce, and Public Works; Secretaría de Agricultura y Comercio y Obras Públicas	Ramón Colón Torres	Popular Democratic Party	25 July 1952 - 1956
Secretary of Justice; Secretaría de Justicia	Víctor Gutiérrez Franqui	Popular Democratic Party	25 July 1952 - 31 October 1952
Secretary of Justice; Secretaría de Justicia	Vacant	Vacant	31 October 1952 - 7 January 1952
Secretary of the Treasury; Secretaría de Hacienda	Sol Luis Descartes Andreu	Popular Democratic Party	25 July 1952 - 24 July 1955
Secretary of Public Instruction; Secretaría de Instrucción Pública	Mariano Villaronga Toro	Ind.	25 July 1952 - 2 January 1957
Secretary of Health; Secretaría de Salud	Juan A. Pons	Ind.	25 July 1952 - 1956(?)
Secretary of Labor; Secretaría del Trabajo	Fernando Sierra Berdecía	Popular Democratic Party	25 July 1952 - 1962

== Notes ==
Preceded by Piñero Jiménez (1946-1949)	Government of Puerto Rico; 1949–1953	Succeeded by Muñoz Marín (1953-1957)
