= 1944 Puerto Rican general election =

1944 Puerto Rico elections
- November 7, 1944

General elections were held in Puerto Rico on November 7, 1944. These were the last elections before the introduction of direct elections for governor in 1948; incumbent governor Rexford Tugwell had been appointed by President Franklin D. Roosevelt. Suffrage was universal; women and men over the age of 21 were eligible to vote.

The Republican Union joined forces with the remnants of the Tripartite Puerto Rican Unification movement, now called the Puerto Rican Progressive Party in the Partido Unión Republicana Progresista (PURP). The PURP and the Socialist Party formed a united front against the Popular Democratic Party (PPD).

Jesús T. Piñero of the PPD was elected Resident Commissioner with 65% of the vote. However, he would later be appointed Governor by President Harry S. Truman in 1946, becoming the only Puerto Rican-born person appointed to the position. He served as governor until Luis Muñoz Marín was elected governor in 1948.

== Results ==
=== Resident commissioner ===
Candidate	Party	Votes	%
Jesús T. Piñero	Popular Democratic Party	383,280	64.75
Manuel Font	PURP–PS–PL	208,516	35.22
Agustín Fernández	Authentic Party	159	0.03
Francisco Grovas	Proletarian Party	23	0.00
Total		591,978	100.00
Registered voters/turnout		719,159	–
Source: Nolla, Nohlen

=== Senate ===
==== At-large senators ====
Candidate	Party	Votes	%	Notes
Luis Muñoz Marín	Popular Democratic Party	148,028	24.99	Elected
Rafael Arjona Siaca	Popular Democratic Party	131,067	22.13	Elected
Vicente Geigel Polanco	Popular Democratic Party	104,104	17.58	Elected
Bolívar Pagán	Socialist Party	67,973	11.48	Elected
Leopoldo Figueroa	Partido Unión Republicana Progresista	53,131	8.97	Elected
José A. Balseiro	Partido Unión Republicana Progresista	48,405	8.17	
Josefina Barceló Bird de Romero	Liberal Party of Puerto Rico	38,643	6.52	
Luis Rojas	Authentic Party	242	0.04	
Victor M. Morales	Proletarian Party	102	0.02	
Independents		618	0.10	
Total		592,313	100.00	
Source: Nolla

==== District senators ====
Party	Class 1			Class 2			Total seats
Party	Votes	%	Seats	Votes	%	Seats	Total seats
Popular Democratic Party	383,293	64.78	7	383,303	64.78	7	14
PURP–PS–PL	208,226	35.19	0	208,219	35.19	0	0
Authentic Party	116	0.02	0	142	0.02	0	0
Proletarian Party	20	0.00	0	20	0.00	0	0
Total	591,655	100.00	7	591,684	100.00	7	14
Source: Nolla

=== House of Representatives ===
==== At-large representatives ====
Candidate	Party	Votes	%	Notes
Ernesto Ramos Antonini	Popular Democratic Party	141,784	23.94	Elected
Samuel R. Quiñones	Popular Democratic Party	128,645	21.72	Elected
Benjamín Ortiz	Popular Democratic Party	112,722	19.03	Elected
Celestino Iriarte Miró	Partido Unión Republicana Progresista	101,536	17.15	Elected
Lino Padrón Rivera	Socialist Party	67,953	11.47	
Rafael Rodríguez Pacheco	Liberal Party of Puerto Rico	38,581	6.52	
Osvaldo Albarrán	Authentic Party	242	0.04	
Tomás de Jesús Castro	Proletarian Party	100	0.02	
Independents		624	0.11	
Total		592,187	100.00	
Source: Nolla

==== District representatives ====
Party	Votes	%	Seats
Popular Democratic Party	383,324	64.72	34
PURP–PS–PL	208,824	35.26	1
Authentic Party	141	0.02	0
Proletarian Party	15	0.00	0
Total	592,304	100.00	35
Source: Nolla

== See also ==
- 1940 Puerto Rican general election
- 1948 Puerto Rican general election
