= Second government of Luis Muñoz Marín =

Second cabinet of the Puerto Rican government

Second Government of Luis Muñoz Marín
- 2nd Constitutional Government of Puerto Rico
- 1953-1957
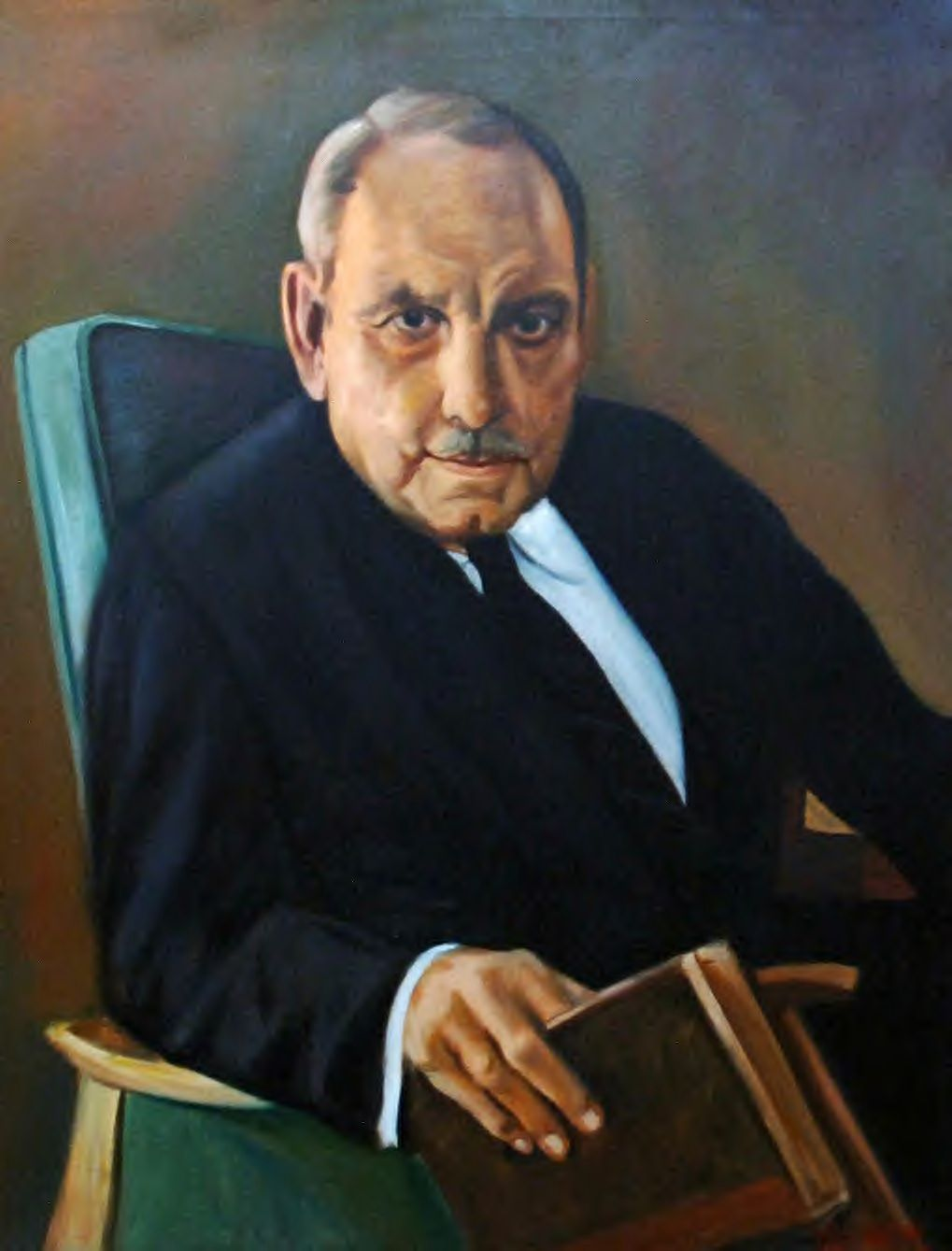
- Governor Muñoz Marín.
- Date formed: 2 January 1953
- Date dissolved: 2 January 1957

People and organisations
- President of the United States of America: Harry S. Truman; Dwight D. Eisenhower
- Governor: Luis Muñoz Marín
- Secretary of State: Roberto Sánchez Vilella
- Total no. of members: 7 Secretaries (Note: Does not include the Governor.); 7 Cabinet Members
- Member party: PPD Ind.
- Status in legislature: Supermajority in both chambers Senate 23 / 32 (72%) House of Representatives 47 / 64 (73%)
- Opposition parties: PIP; PER
- Opposition leaders: Gilberto Concepción de Gracia (PIP) Miguel A. García Méndez (PER)

History
- Incoming formation: 1952 Puerto Rican general election
- Election: 1952 Puerto Rican general election
- Outgoing election: 1956 Puerto Rican general election
- Legislature term: 2nd Legislative Assembly of Puerto Rico
- Budgets: 1953 Puerto Rico Budget; 1954 Puerto Rico Budget; 1955 Puerto Rico Budget; 1956 Puerto Rico Budget
- Advice and consent: Senate of Puerto Rico; House of Representatives of Puerto Rico (Note: The House provides advice and consent for the Secretary of State, as he is first in line in the Puerto Rico governor' order of succession as established in Article IV, Section 5, Constitution of Puerto Rico, 1952)
- Predecessor: First government of Luis Muñoz Marín
- Successor: Third government of Luis Muñoz Marín

This second government of Governor of Puerto Rico Luis Muñoz Marín followed his reelection after the enactment of the 1952 Commonwealth Constitution. In many ways it was a continuation of the previous government, with some changes in key positions such as the Secretary of Justice, and decreased (but still supermajoritarian) control of the Senate of Puerto Rico and House of Representatives of Puerto Rico by virtue of the expansion of the Legislative Assembly's chambers and the effects of Article III, Section 7, Constitution of Puerto Rico, 1952.

== Party breakdown ==
Party breakdown of cabinet members, not including the governor:

- Popular Democratic Party
- Independents
5
2

The cabinet was composed of members of the PPD and two independents or technical positions (or people whose membership in a party was not clearly ascertained from any available media).

== Members of the Cabinet ==
The Puerto Rican Cabinet was led by the Governor alone in this period. The Cabinet was composed of all the Secretaries of the executive departments of the Commonwealth government, which at this time was limited to a small number of offices as delineated initially in the Constitution.

Office	Name	Party	Term
=== Governor ===
Governor of Puerto Rico; Gobernación de Puerto Rico	Luis Muñoz Marín	Popular Democratic Party	24 July 1952 – 2 January 1965
=== Council of Secretaries ===
Secretary of State; Secretaría de Estado	Roberto Sánchez Vilella	Popular Democratic Party	25 July 1952 - 2 January 1965
Secretary of Agriculture, Commerce, and Public Works; Secretaría de Agricultura y Comercio y Obras Públicas	Ramón Colón Torres	Popular Democratic Party	25 July 1952 - 1956
Secretary of Justice; Secretaría de Justicia	José Trías Monge	Popular Democratic Party	7 January 1953 - 2 January 1957
Secretary of the Treasury; Secretaría de Hacienda	Sol Luis Descartes Andreu	Popular Democratic Party	25 July 1952 - 24 July 1955
Secretary of the Treasury; Secretaría de Hacienda	Rafael Picó Santiago	Popular Democratic Party	31 October 1955 - late 1957/1958
Secretary of Public Instruction; Secretaría de Instrucción Pública	Mariano Villaronga Toro	Ind.	25 July 1952 - 2 January 1957
Secretary of Health; Secretaría de Salud	Juan A. Pons	Ind.	25 July 1952 - 2 January 1957
Secretary of Labor; Secretaría del Trabajo	Fernando Sierra Berdecía	Popular Democratic Party	25 July 1952 - 1962

== Notes ==
Preceded by Muñoz Marín (1949-1953)	Government of Puerto Rico; 1953-1957	Succeeded by Muñoz Marín (1957-1961)
