= Partido Reformista Puertorriqueño =

The Puerto Rican Reformist Party (Spanish: Partido Reformista Puertorriqueño) was a short-lived Puerto Rican political party. The Puerto Rican Reformist Party was founded in 1948 after the Liberal Party decided to rename themselves.

== Founding ==
After losing the 1944 resident commissioner election, the Liberal Party was on its last leg. In a final attempt to survive, the party met in a general assembly, on August 8, 1948 in Mayagüez, under the presidency of Santiago Iglesias Silva, discussed the political situation of the Island and the next elections to be celebrated, the 1948 general election.

During the assembly, among other resolutions, the party approved a resolution to rename the party and change its insignia. They ended up choosing the name Puerto Rican Reformist Party and a yellow flag with a rooster in the middle as their new insignia.

== 1948 election and demise ==
For the 1948 election, they joined the Puerto Rican Statehood Party and the Socialist Party in nominating Martín Travieso as their candidate for governor, going against PPDs Luis Muñoz Marín and PIPs Francisco Susoni. In the end, Travieso received 182,977 votes, with 29,140 of these under the PRPs insignia. After this election, the party disbanded.
