= 1940 Puerto Rican general election =

1940 Puerto Rico elections
- November 5, 1940

General elections were held in Puerto Rico on 5 November 1940. Bolívar Pagán of the Republican Union–Socialist Party Coalition was elected Resident Commissioner with 39% of the vote.

== Results ==
=== Resident commissioner ===
Candidate	Party	Votes	%
Bolívar Pagán	Coalition (UR–PS)	222,423	39.10
Antonio Fernós-Isern	Popular Democratic Party	214,857	37.77
Miguel A. García Méndez	UPT–PFP	131,571	23.13
Total		568,851	100.00
Registered voters/turnout		714,960	–
Source: Nolla Nohlen

=== Senate ===
==== At-large senators ====
Candidate	Party	Votes	%	Notes
Luis Muñoz Marín	Popular Democratic Party	111,781	19.64	Elected
Vicente Geigel Polanco	Popular Democratic Party	103,054	18.10	Elected
Lino Padrón Rivera	Socialist Party	87,737	15.41	Elected
Rafael Martínez Nadal	Republican Union	69,709	12.25	Elected
José del Río	Republican Union	65,639	11.53	Elected
José Ramírez Santibáñez	UPT–PFP	64,042	11.25	
Rafael Padró Parés	UPT–PFP	34,065	5.98	
Alfonso Lastra Chárriez	UPT–PFP	33,186	5.83	
Independents		12	0.00	
Total		569,225	100.00	
Source: Nolla

==== District senators ====
Party	Class 1			Class 2			Total seats
Party	Votes	%	Seats	Votes	%	Seats	Total seats
Coalition	216,903	38.55	3	222,624	39.18	3	6
Popular Democratic Party	214,732	38.17	4	214,688	37.78	4	8
UPT–PFP	130,952	23.28	0	130,955	23.04	0	0
Total	562,587	100.00	7	568,267	100.00	7	14
Source: Nolla

=== House of Representatives ===
==== At-large representatives ====
Candidate	Party	Votes	%	Notes
Ernesto Ramos Antonini	Popular Democratic Party	112,005	19.70	Elected
Samuel R. Quiñones	Popular Democratic Party	102,592	18.05	Elected
Jorge Gauthier	Socialist Party	87,222	15.34	Elected
Alfonso Valdés Cobián	Republican Union	68,734	12.09	Elected
Blas C. Herrero	Republican Union	66,522	11.70	
Félix Ochoteco Junior	UPT–PFP	66,207	11.65	
Prudencio Rivera Martínez	UPT–PFP	65,021	11.44	
Independents		139	0.02	
Total		568,442	100.00	
Source: Nolla

==== District representatives ====
Party	Votes	%	Seats
Coalition	222,766	39.18	17
Popular Democratic Party	214,820	37.78	15
UPT–PFP	130,973	23.04	3
Total	568,559	100.00	35
Source: Nolla
