= 1948 Puerto Rican general election =

- November 2, 1948
- Gubernatorial election
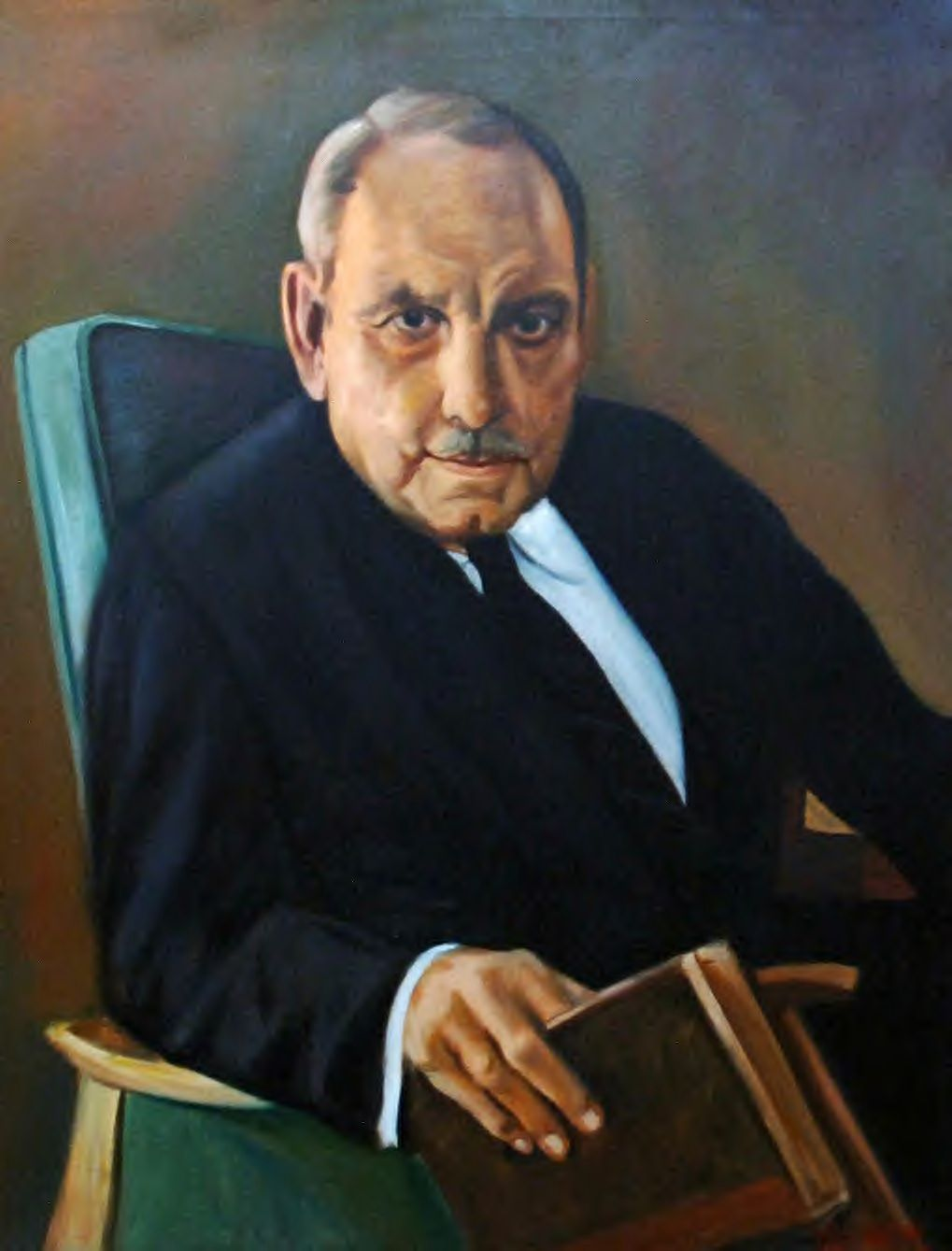

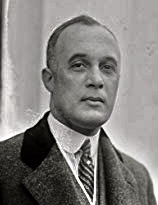

Nominee	Luis Muñoz Marín	Martin Travieso	Francisco Susoni
Party	Popular Democratic	PEP–PS–PRP	Independence
Popular vote	392,386	182,977	65,351
Percentage	61.24%	28.56%	10.20%
- Results by municipality Marín: 40–50% 50–60% 60–70% 70–80% 80–90% Travieso: 50–60%
Governor before election
Jesus T. Piñero
Elected Governor
Luis Muñoz Marín
Popular Democratic
- Resident Commissioner election
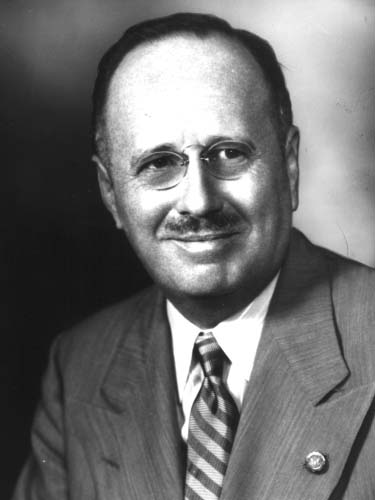

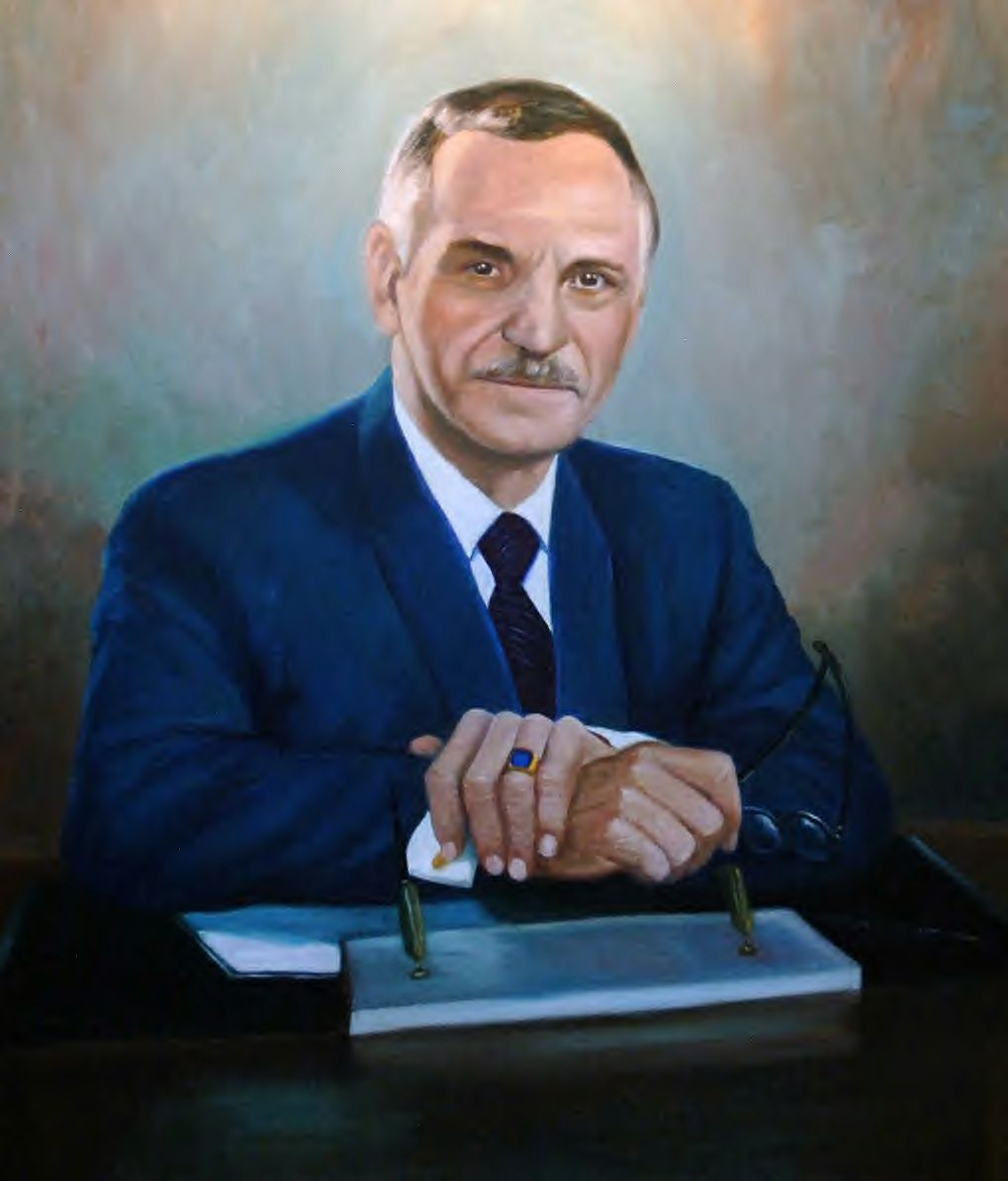

Nominee	Antonio Fernós-Isern	Luis A. Ferré	Rafael Arjona-Siaca
Party	Popular Democratic	PEP–PS–PRP	Independence
Popular vote	392,033	180,513	66,141
Percentage	61.38%	28.26%	10.36%
- Results by municipality Fernós-Isern: 40–50% 50–60% 60–70% 70–80% 80–90%

General elections were held in Puerto Rico on November 2, 1948. Prior to the elections, amendments to the Jones–Shafroth Act of 1917 had made the Governor of Puerto Rico an elected position, the governor having previously been appointed by the President of the United States; outgoing governor Jesús T. Piñero had been appointed by Harry S. Truman.

The Popular Democratic Party (PPD) formally distanced itself from the independence movement in a statement by its gubernatorial candidate Luis Muñoz Marín. The Republican Union Party changed its name to the Statehood Party, the former Liberal Party changed its name to the Reformist Party, and the Socialist Party ran alone in this election. Martín Travieso ran for governor on a coalition ticket for the Statehood, Socialist and Puerto Rican Reformist parties.

Muñoz Marín won the gubernatorial elections with 61% of the vote, becoming the first popularly elected governor of Puerto Rico.

== Results ==
=== Governor ===
Candidate	Party	Votes	%
Luis Muñoz Marín	Popular Democratic Party	392,386	61.24
Martín Travieso	PEP–PS–PRP	182,977	28.56
Francisco Susoni	Puerto Rican Independence Party	65,351	10.20
Total		640,714	100.00
Registered voters/turnout		873,085	–
Source: Nohlen

=== Resident Commissioner ===
Candidate	Party	Votes	%
Antonio Fernós-Isern	Popular Democratic Party	392,033	61.38
Luis A. Ferré	PEP–PS–PRP	180,513	28.26
Rafael Arjona-Siaca	Puerto Rican Independence Party	66,141	10.36
Total		638,687	100.00
Registered voters/turnout		873,085	–
Source: Nolla-Acosta

=== Senate ===
==== At-large senators ====
Candidate	Party	Votes	%	Notes
Samuel R. Quiñones	Popular Democratic Party	132,381	20.75	Elected
Víctor Gutiérrez Franqui	Popular Democratic Party	131,073	20.55	Elected
Ramón Barreto Pérez	Popular Democratic Party	128,600	20.16	Elected
Bolívar Pagán	PS–PRP	91,859	14.40	Elected
Celestino Iriarte Miró	Partido Estadista Puertorriqueño	87,758	13.76	Elected
Gilberto Concepción de Gracia	Puerto Rican Independence Party	37,952	5.95	
José Luis Feliú Pesquera	Puerto Rican Independence Party	28,219	4.42	
Total		637,842	100.00	
Source: Nolla-Acosta

==== District senators ====
Party	Class 1			Class 2			Total seats
Party	Votes	%	Seats	Votes	%	Seats	Total seats
Popular Democratic Party	392,111	61.46	7	392,275	61.48	7	14
PEP–PS–PRP	179,744	28.17	0	179,713	28.17	0	0
Puerto Rican Independence Party	66,106	10.36	0	66,065	10.35	0	0
Total	637,961	100.00	7	638,053	100.00	7	14
Source: Nolla-Acosta

=== House of Representatives ===
==== At-large representatives ====
Candidate	Party	Votes	%	Notes
Benjamín Ortiz	Popular Democratic Party	132,392	20.76	Elected
Pedro Vega Berrios	Popular Democratic Party	131,005	20.54	Elected
Ernesto Ramos Antonini	Popular Democratic Party	128,644	20.17	Elected
Leopoldo Figueroa	PEP–PRP	115,511	18.11	Elected
Antonio Reyes Delgado	Socialist Party	64,152	10.06	
Baltazar Quiñones Elías	Puerto Rican Independence Party	37,549	5.89	
Fernando Milán Jr.	Puerto Rican Independence Party	28,606	4.48	
Total		637,859	100.00	
Source: Nolla-Acosta

==== District representatives ====
Party	Votes	%	Seats
Popular Democratic Party	389,127	60.70	35
PEP–PS–PRP	179,617	28.02	0
Puerto Rican Independence Party	67,461	10.52	0
Criollo Party	4,885	0.76	0
Total	641,090	100.00	35
Source: Nolla-Acosta
