= Unificación Puertorriqueña Tripartita =

Unificación Puertorriqueña Tripartita (Tripartite Puerto Rican Unification) was a political party in Puerto Rico founded on July 14, 1940. It resulted from the merger of three political parties: Partido Liberal Puertorriqueño, Partido Unión Republicana Progresista and Partido Laborista Puro. It supported statehood for Puerto Rico as its major tenet.

== Sources ==
- Coaliciones, alianzas, y uniones entre las colectividades (1896-1945) by CECANGPR
- Entre 1920 y 1924 on Pomarrosas
