= 1952 Puerto Rican general election =

- November 4, 1952
- Gubernatorial election
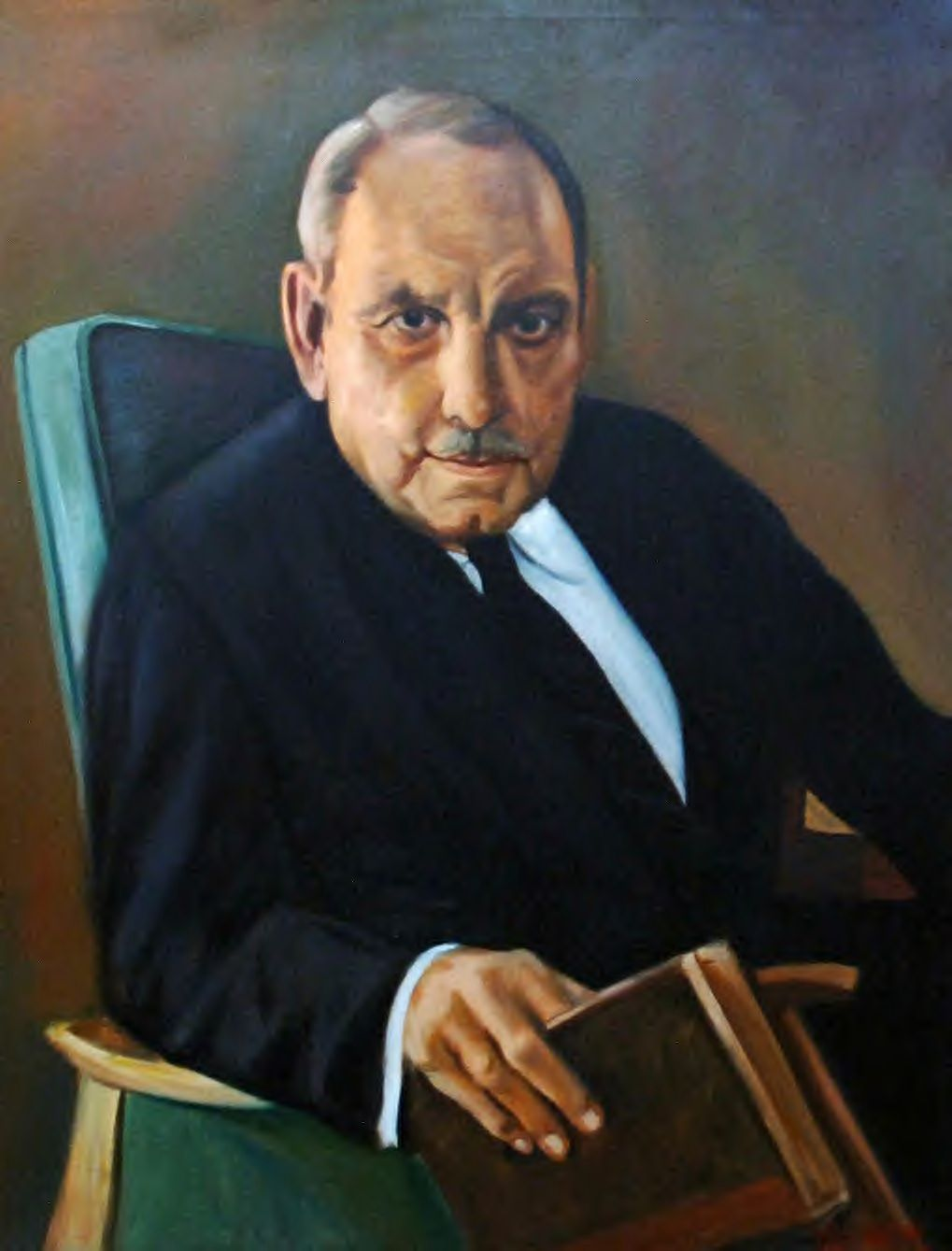

Nominee	Luis Muñoz Marín	Fernando Milán Suárez	Francisco López Domínguez
Party	Popular Democratic	Independence	PEP
Popular vote	431,409	126,228	85,591
Percentage	64.88%	18.98%	12.87%
- Results by municipality Marín: 50–60% 60–70% 70–80% 80–90%
Governor before election
Luis Muñoz Marín
Popular Democratic
Elected Governor
Luis Muñoz Marín
Popular Democratic
- Resident Commissioner election
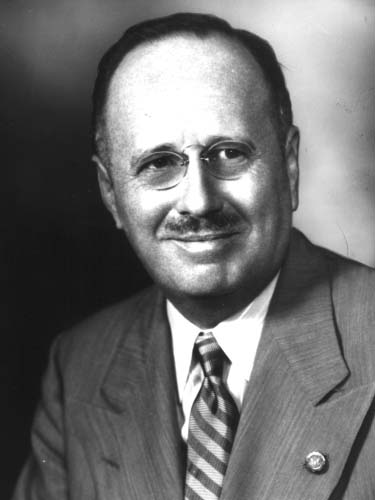

Nominee	Antonio Fernós-Isern	Carmen Rivera De Alvarado	Juan B. Soto
Party	Popular Democratic	Independence	PEP
Popular vote	430,296	126,208	85,788
Percentage	64.80%	19.01%	12.92%

General elections were held in Puerto Rico on November 4, 1952. They were the second direct gubernatorial elections and the first after the ratification of the 1952 constitution.

Luis Muñoz Marín of the Popular Democratic Party (PPD) was re-elected as governor with 65% of the vote, whilst the PPD also won a majority of seats in the Senate and House of Representatives elections.

== Results ==
=== Governor ===
Candidate	Party	Votes	%
Luis Muñoz Marín	Popular Democratic Party	431,409	64.88
Fernando Milán Suárez	Puerto Rican Independence Party	126,228	18.98
Francisco López Domínguez	Partido Estadista Puertorriqueño	85,591	12.87
Luis Moczó	Socialist Party	21,719	3.27
Total		664,947	100.00
Registered voters/turnout		883,219	–
Source: Nohlen

=== Resident Commissioner ===
Candidate	Party	Votes	%
Antonio Fernós-Isern	Popular Democratic Party	430,296	64.80
Carmen Rivera de Alvarado	Puerto Rican Independence Party	126,208	19.01
Juan B. Soto	Partido Estadista Puertorriqueño	85,788	12.92
Angel Fernández Sánchez	Socialist Party	21,719	3.27
Total		664,011	100.00
Source: Nolla-Acosta

=== Senate ===
Party	District class I			District class II			At-large			Total seats
Party	Votes	%	Seats	Votes	%	Seats	Votes	%	Seats	Total seats
Popular Democratic Party	430,158	64.81	8	430,200	73.29	8	429,812	64.78	7	23
Puerto Rican Independence Party	126,149	19.01	0	126,132	21.49	0	126,218	19.02	3	3
Partido Estadista Puertorriqueño	85,639	12.90	0	8,869	1.51	0	85,704	12.92	1	1
Socialist Party	21,730	3.27	0	21,756	3.71	0	21,782	3.28	0	0
Total	663,676	100.00	8	586,957	100.00	8	663,516	100.00	11	27
Source: Nolla-Acosta

=== House of Representatives ===
Party	District			At-large			Total seats
Party	Votes	%	Seats	Votes	%	Seats	Total seats
Popular Democratic Party	429,587	64.37	40	429,631	64.74	7	47
Puerto Rican Independence Party	126,089	18.89	0	126,076	19.00	2	2
Partido Estadista Puertorriqueño	89,905	13.47	0	86,165	12.98	2	2
Socialist Party	21,821	3.27	0	21,719	3.27	0	0
Total	667,402	100.00	40	663,591	100.00	11	51
Source: Nolla-Acosta
