= Víctor Gutiérrez Franqui =

Puerto Rican politician (1908–1963)

Member of the Puerto Rico Senate from the at-large district
- In office 1949–1960

Majority Leader of the Puerto Rico Senate
- In office 1941–1953

Attorney General of Puerto Rico
- In office 1951–1952

Personal details
- Born: July 8, 1908 Caguas, Puerto Rico
- Died: January 20, 1963 (aged 54) San Juan, Puerto Rico
- Party: Popular Democratic Party
- Other political affiliations: Democratic Party
- Education: College of the Holy Cross (BA); University of Puerto Rico School of Law (JD)

Víctor Gutiérrez Franqui (July 8, 1908 – January 20, 1963) was a lawyer, politician and a former attorney general of Puerto Rico.

== Early life and education ==
Franqui was born in Caguas, Puerto Rico, on July 8, 1908, the son of Víctor Gutiérrez and Carolina Franqui Skerret. He completed secondary school at Colegio San Agustín in San Juan. After high school, he attended the College of the Holy Cross in Worcester, Massachusetts, where he graduated with a Bachelor of Arts in 1930. After returning to Puerto Rico, he entered the University of Puerto Rico School of Law, earning his law degree in 1933.

== Politics ==
He practiced as a criminal lawyer and together with Ernesto Ramos Antonini the achieved the acquittal of 20 young nationalists accused for their participation in the Ponce Massacre. In 1944, Luis Muñoz Marín, then President of the Senate, appointed him assistant special resident commissioner in Washington Jesús T. Piñero. He was elected to the Puerto Rico Senate as senator at-large for Popular Democratic Party. He was majority leader of the Puerto Rico Senate for his delegation. Was appointed as Attorney General of Puerto Rico in 1951. Under the Constitution of the Commonwealth of Puerto Rico, adopted in 1952, the office of attorney general was renamed to secretary of justice.

== Death ==
Víctor Gutiérrez Franqui died on January 20, 1963, in San Juan, Puerto Rico at age 54.

Senate of Puerto Rico
Preceded by Vicente Geigel Polanco	Majority Leader of the Puerto Rico Senate; 1941–1953	Succeeded by Luis Negrón López
Legal offices
Preceded by Vicente Geigel Polanco	Attorney General of Puerto Rico; 1951–1952	Succeeded by José Trías Monge
