= Partido Unión Republicana Progresista =

Former political party in Puerto Rico

Partido Unión Republicana Progresista (Republican Progressive Union Party) was a political party in Puerto Rico that ran in the 1944 elections. Founded in 1940, it resulted from Partido Unión Republicana. Its president was Celestino Iriarte. It ceased to exist in 1948, when it changed its name to Partido Estadista Puertorriqueño (Puerto Rican Statehood Party).

== See also ==
- Socialist Party (Puerto Rico)
- Partido Republicano Puro
- Partido Unión Republicana
