= Vicente Geigel Polanco =

Puerto Rican politician

Member of the Puerto Rico Senate from the at-large district
- In office 1941–1948

Attorney General of Puerto Rico
- In office 1949–1951
- Governor: Luis Muñoz Marín
- Preceded by: Luis Negrón Fernández
- Succeeded by: Víctor Gutiérrez Franqui

Personal details
- Born: May 1, 1904 Isabela, Puerto Rico
- Died: April 30, 1979 (aged 74) San Juan, Puerto Rico
- Party: Popular Democratic Party
- Education: University of Puerto Rico School of Law (JD)
- Profession: Politician, Lawyer

Vicente Geigel Polanco (May 1, 1904 – April 30, 1979) was a lawyer, writer and a former Attorney General of Puerto Rico.

== Early life and education ==
Vicente Géigel Polanco was born on May 1, 1904, in Isabela, Puerto Rico, he studied at the school Isabela Primary School, secondary school at Colegio José de Diego and high school at Central High School in Santurce, Puerto Rico. Did his studies in law were carried out in the University of Puerto Rico School of Law where he earned a juris doctor.

== Career ==
By 1929, he held the position of secretary of the Ateneo Puertorriqueño. In the 1930s, he became part of the top leadership of the Popular Democratic Party, in addition to serving as a professor of Law and in the Faculty of Social Sciences of the University of Puerto Rico.

In 1934, he helped found the Puerto Rican Academy of History.

In the 1940 elections, Géigel Polanco was one of the candidates for senator at-large of the Popular Party, and he was elected, and the new popular majority selected him to serve as the majority leader in the Senate of Puerto Rico. He also held the presidency of the Committee on Education from 1941 to 1948. Additionally, during his tenure in the Senate, he was vice president of the Finance and Development; Legal; Labor; Agriculture, Industry and Commerce; and Internal Government, Rules, and Special Affairs committees.

== Death ==
Vicente Géigel Polanco died on April 30, 1979, at the age of 74 in San Juan, Puerto Rico. He was buried at Puerto Rico Memorial Cemetery in Carolina, Puerto Rico.

Senate of Puerto Rico
Preceded by First Majority Leader of the PPD	Majority Leader of the Puerto Rico Senate; 1941–1945	Succeeded by Víctor Gutiérrez Franqui
Legal offices
Preceded by Luis Negrón Fernández	Attorney General of Puerto Rico; 1949-1951	Succeeded by Víctor Gutiérrez Franqui
