= Partido Estadista Puertorriqueño =

Former political party in Puerto Rico

Puerto Rican Statehood Party Partido Estadista Puertorriqueño
- Abbreviation: PEPR
- Founded: 1948
- Dissolved: 1952; 73 years ago
- Succeeded by: Partido Estadista Republicano
- Headquarters: San Juan, Puerto Rico
- Ideology: Statehood; Conservatism
- Political position: Right-wing

Partido Estadista Puertorriqueño (English: Puerto Rican Statehood Party) [1948 - 1952] was a political party in Puerto Rico that existed from 1948 to 1952. The party resulted when Partido Unión Republicana Progresista ceased to exist in 1948, renaming itself as "Partido Estadista Puertorriqueño." Its president was Celestino Iriarte. Partido Estadista Puertorriqueño dissolved in 1952 when, once again, it changed names "to return to its roots" and renamed itself as Partido Estadista Republicano, the party founded by Jose Celso Barbosa in 1899.

== See also ==
- Socialist Party (Puerto Rico)
- Partido Republicano Puro
- Partido Unión Republicana
