= Puerto Rico Highway 178 =

Highway in Puerto Rico

Highway 178
- Ruta 178
- Carretera Monseñor José Antonio Colón Ferrer

Route information
- Maintained by Puerto Rico DTPW
- Length: 3.2 km (2.0 mi)
- Existed: 1953–present

Major junctions
- CCW end: PR-3 in Guásimas
- CW end: PR-3 / PR-753 in Arroyo barrio-pueblo–Palmas–Pitahaya

Location
- Country: United States
- Territory: Puerto Rico
- Municipalities: Arroyo

Highway system
- Roads in Puerto Rico; List
← PR-177	→ PR-179

Puerto Rico Highway 178 (PR-178) is the main access to downtown Arroyo, Puerto Rico. This road extends from PR-3 in Guásimas to returning again to PR-3 at its junction with PR-753 between downtown, Pitahaya and Palmas barrios.

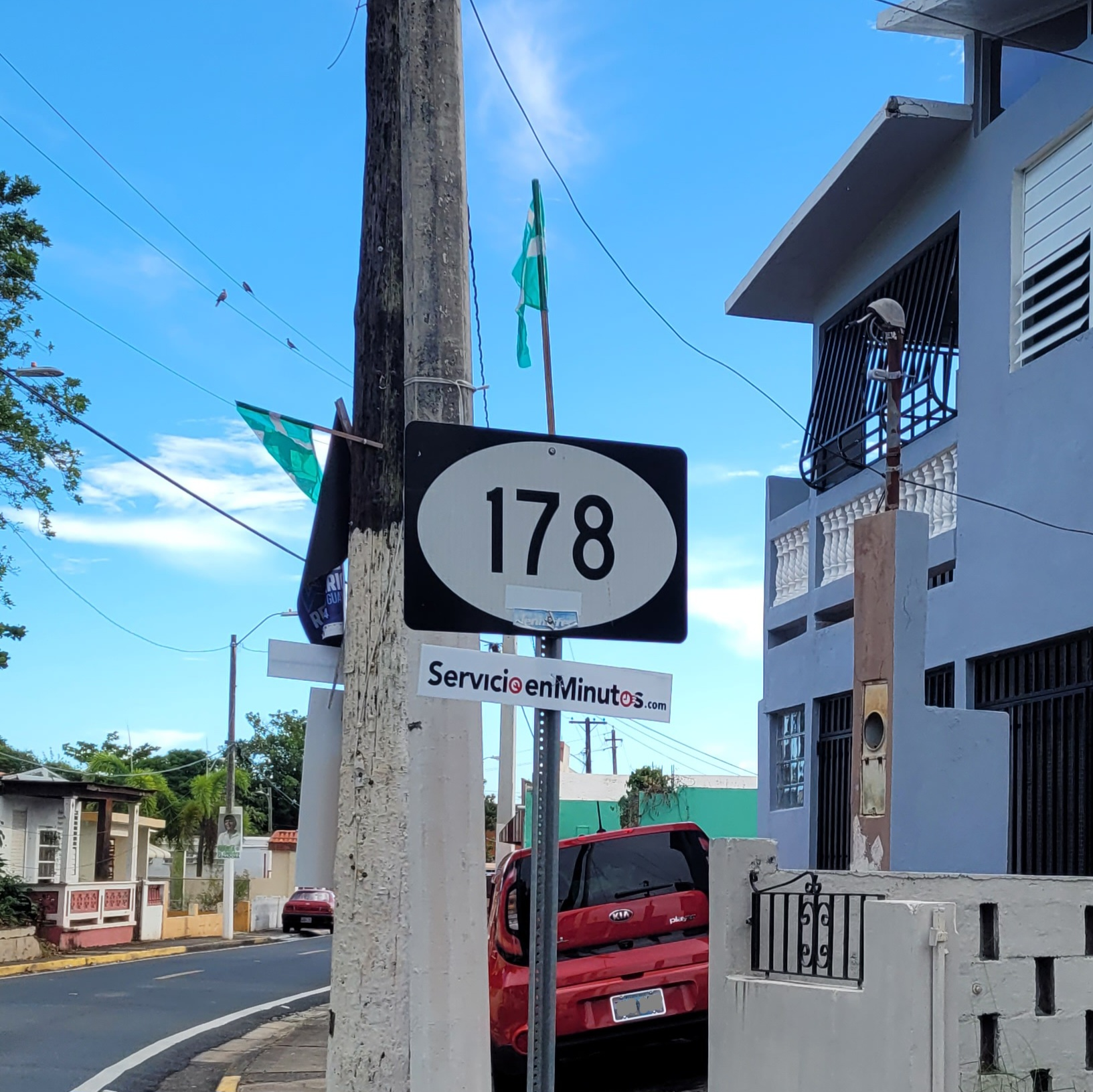
Sign for PR-178, entering downtown Arroyo

== Major intersections ==
The entire route is located in Arroyo.

Location	km	mi	Destinations	Notes
Guásimas	3.2	2.0	PR-3 – Guayama	Counterclockwise terminus of PR-178
Arroyo barrio-pueblo–Palmas– Pitahaya tripoint	0.0	0.0	PR-3 – Patillas	Clockwise terminus of PR-178 and southern terminus of PR-753
Arroyo barrio-pueblo–Palmas– Pitahaya tripoint	0.0	0.0	PR-753	Continuation beyond PR-3
1.000 mi = 1.609 km; 1.000 km = 0.621 mi

== See also ==
- 1953 Puerto Rico highway renumbering
