= Juan Bernardo Huyke =

Governor of Puerto Rico

Juan Huyke
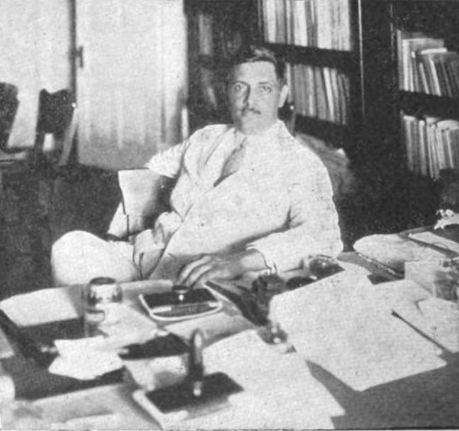
- Huyke, c. 1921

Acting Governor of Puerto Rico
- In office February 16, 1923 – April 6, 1923
- Preceded by: Emmet Montgomery Reily
- Succeeded by: Horace Mann Towner

Secretary of Education of Puerto Rico
- In office 1921–1930
- Governor: Arthur Yager; José E. Benedicto (Acting); Emmet Montgomery Reily; Horace Mann Towner; James R. Beverley; Theodore Roosevelt Jr.
- Preceded by: Paul G. Miller
- Succeeded by: José Padín

Speaker of the Puerto Rico House of Representatives
- In office 1918–1921
- Preceded by: José de Diego
- Succeeded by: Cayetano Coll y Cuchí

Speaker pro tempore of the Puerto Rico House of Representatives
- In office 1907–1918
- Preceded by: Position established
- Succeeded by: Miguel Guerra Mondragón

Personal details
- Born: Juan Bernardo Huyke Bocello; June 11, 1880 Arroyo, Captaincy General of Puerto Rico
- Died: December 17, 1961 (aged 81) San Juan, Puerto Rico
- Party: Unionist
- Other political affiliations: Republican

Juan Bernardo Huyke Bozello (June 11, 1880 – December 17, 1961) served as acting governor of Puerto Rico several months in 1923.

== Background ==
Huyke was born in Arroyo, Puerto Rico, on June 11, 1880. He was the son of Don Enrique Huyke and Doña Carmen Bozello y Guzmán, a playwright and writer. His father, a principal of a school in Arroyo, named him Huyke after his grandfather (Bernardo H. Huyke), who lived with his family on the island of Curaçao in 1891. He studied at the Normal School of the University of Puerto Rico. At the age of 21 Juan Bernardo Huyke began his career as an English teacher at a school in Arroyo.

He was an attorney, writer, publisher, educator, and statesman. He served as Puerto Rico's Superintendent of Schools from 1908 until 1910. As superintendent, he was among the first to promote bilingual education.

Appointed by U.S. President Warren G. Harding, Huyke led the insular Department of Education for nearly a decade. A firm proponent of bilingual education and close political and civic ties with the United States, he implemented curricula that promoted English proficiency alongside Spanish—a focal point of debate in early 20th-century Puerto Rican educational policy.

Huyke Bozello was president of the American Red Cross in Puerto Rico. He served in the Puerto Rico House of Representatives from 1912 to 1920, and became Commissioner of Public Instruction in 1921 until 1930.

== Interim Governor of Puerto Rico ==
Between the resignation of Governor Emmet Montgomery Reily and the inauguration of Horace Mann Towner, Huyke served as interim Governor of Puerto Rico from February to April 1923. He was the first native Puerto Rican to serve as chief executive of the territory under U.S. civil rule.

== Civil Service Leadership ==
From 1935 to 1945, Huyke served as Chairman of the Puerto Rico Civil Service Commission; later, in 1950, Huyke returned to regional educational leadership as superintendent of the Bayamón school district.

Huyke passed away on December 17, 1961, in San Juan. Today, his legacy in Puerto Rican civic life and public education is commemorated through schools and public streets bearing his name across the island.

Huyke was the father of famed Puerto Rican sports journalist Emilio Huyke. Huyke was the grandfather of Major League Baseball Player and coach Woody Huyke.

== Publications ==
In 1932, Huyke published El Pais (The Country) a pro-statehood newspaper that represented many conservative views.

Huyke wrote and published several books, among his popular sellers were Children and Schools Niños y Escuelas, Advice Our Youth, Stories of Puerto Rico, If I Were 21 Years old, Verse of Hector, The Small Cause, The Antillean Agony, and How I Educated My Son.

House of Representatives of Puerto Rico
New office	Speaker pro tempore of the Puerto Rico House of Representatives; 1907–1918	Succeeded by Miguel Guerra Mondragón
Political offices
Preceded by José de Diego	Speaker of the Puerto Rico House of Representatives; 1918–1921	Succeeded by Cayetano Coll y Cuchí
Preceded by Paul G. Miller	Secretary of Education of Puerto Rico; 1921–1930	Succeeded by José Padín
Preceded by Emmet Montgomery Reily	Governor of Puerto Rico; Acting; March 1923 - April 6, 1923	Succeeded by Horace Mann Towner
