= Basilio Figueroa =

Puerto Rican politician (born 1951)

Mayor of Arroyo
- In office 2003 – January 13, 2013
- Preceded by: Reinaldo Pirela
- Succeeded by: Eric Bachier Román

Member of the Municipal Assembly of Arroyo, Puerto Rico
- In office 2000-2003

Personal details
- Born: December 10, 1951 (age 74) Arroyo, Puerto Rico
- Party: New Progressive Party (PNP)

Basilio Figueroa de Jesús (born December 10, 1951) is a Puerto Rican politician and former mayor of Arroyo. Figueroa is affiliated with the New Progressive Party (PNP) and served as mayor from 2003 to 2013.
