= Eric Bachier Román =

Puerto Rican politician

Mayor of Arroyo, Puerto Rico
- Incumbent
- Assumed office January 14, 2013
- Preceded by: Basilio Figueroa

Personal details
- Born: Eric Enrique Bachier Román; August 21, 1976 (age 50) Salinas, Puerto Rico
- Party: Popular Democratic Party (PPD)
- Spouse: Glorimar Rodríguez
- Children: Perla del Mar; Ambar
- Education: University of Puerto Rico at Humacao (AS)

Eric Enrique Bachier Román (born August 21, 1976) is a Puerto Rican politician and the current mayor of Arroyo, Puerto Rico. Bachier is affiliated with the Popular Democratic Party (PPD) and has served as mayor since 2013.

== Early life and education ==
Eric Enrique Bachier Román was born in the municipality of Salinas, Puerto Rico. He is the youngest son of Jesús Bachier and Carmen Román. Bachier began his primary education in the Dolores Huyke Enrique Gonzalez School, located in the Urb. Jardines de Arroyo. After that, he continued his studies at the José de Choudens and Carmen Bozello de Huyke School where he received his school diploma. Bachier completed an associate degree in Chemical Technology from the University of Puerto Rico at Humacao. During his professional career, Bachier worked in various positions in the private industry, including manager of a Kmart store for 15 years.

== Sports career ==
Bachier showed interest in sports since childhood, particularly baseball. As he grew up, he played Class A and Double-A baseball. Bachier was also a member of the National Junior Team of Puerto Rico. He was also a gold and silver medalist at the Intercollegiate Games (Justas LAI).

== Political career ==
Bachier is affiliated with the Popular Democratic Party (PPD) of Puerto Rico. He started his political career in 2012, when he ran for mayor of the municipality of Arroyo. At the 2012 general election, Bachier defeated the incumbent mayor, Basilio Figueroa. He was reelected at the 2016 general election.

== Personal life ==
Bachier is married to Glorimar Rodríguez. They have two daughters, Perla del Mar and Ambar.
