= Yaurel, Arroyo, Puerto Rico =

Barrio of Puerto Rico

Yaurel
- Barrio
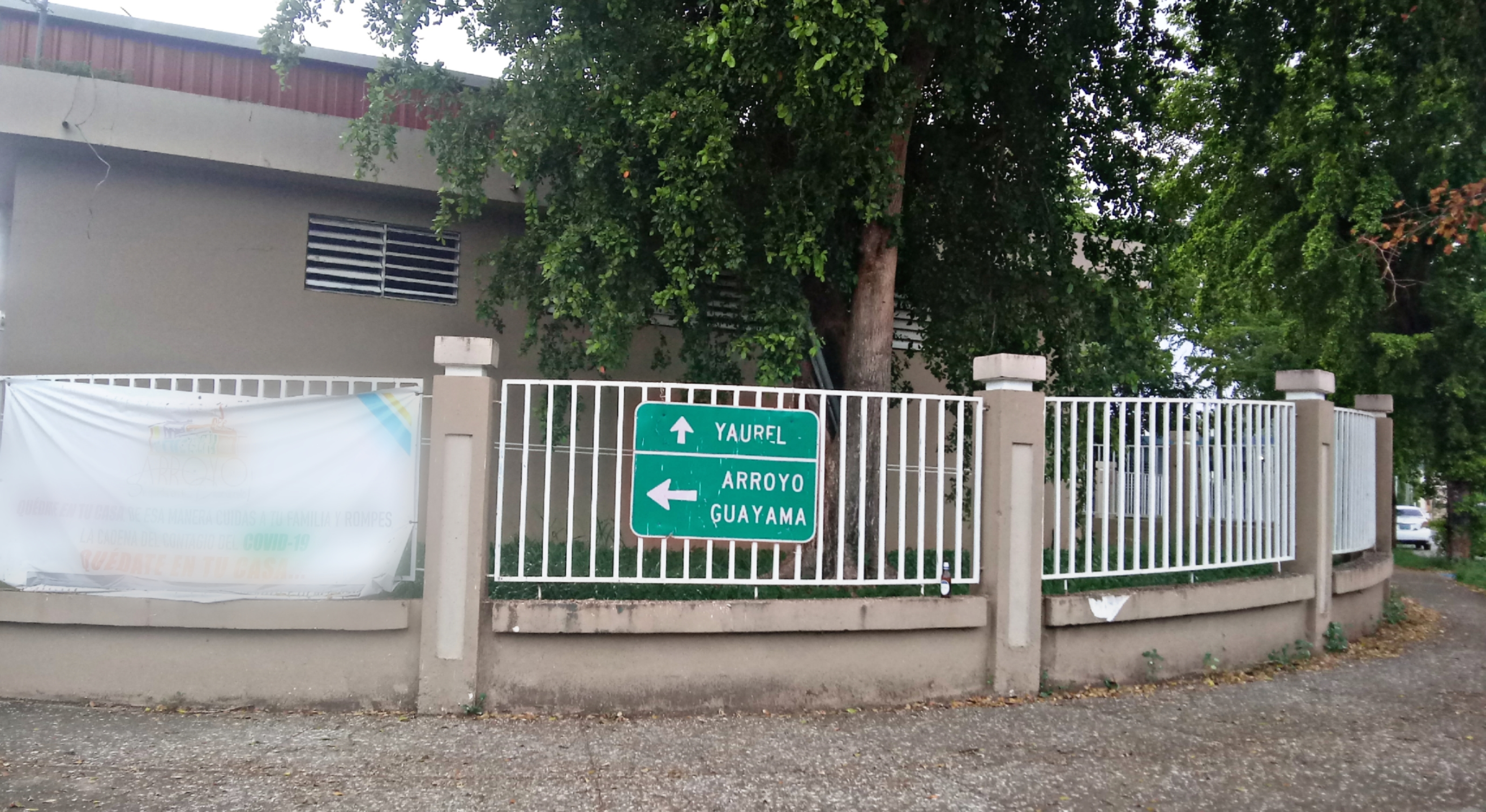
- Sign for Yaurel and faded COVID-19 Quedate en tu casa (stay home) public health sign

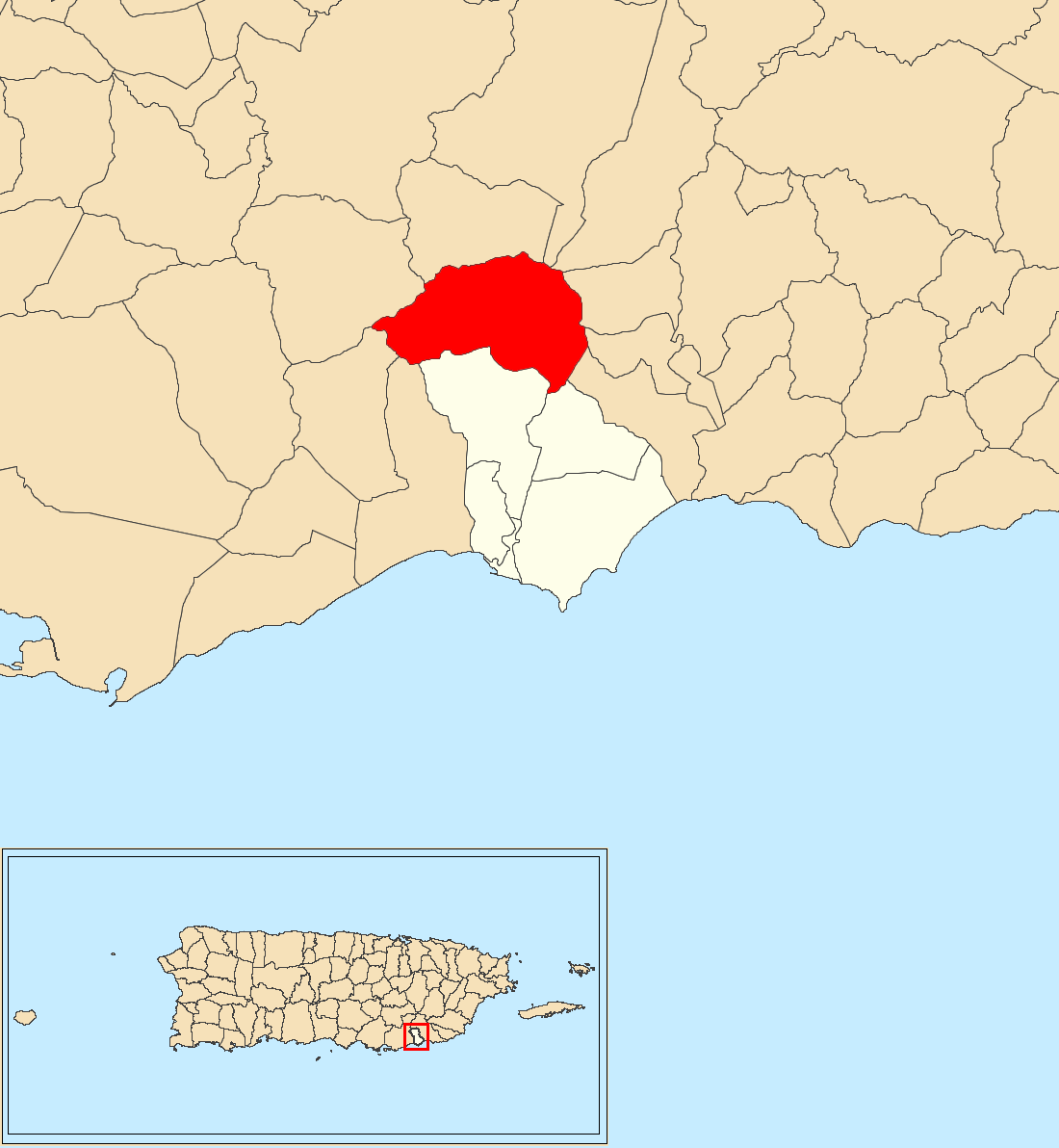
- Location of Yaurel within the municipality of Arroyo shown in red

- Location of Puerto Rico
- Coordinates: 18°01′42″N 66°04′08″W
- Commonwealth: Puerto Rico
- Municipality: Arroyo

Area
  - Total: 4.77 sq mi (12.4 km^{2})
  - Land: 4.77 sq mi (12.4 km^{2})
  - Water: 0.00 sq mi (0 km^{2})
- Elevation: 873 ft (266 m)

Population (2010)
  - Total: 1,589
  - Density: 163.7/sq mi (63.2/km^{2})
- Source: 2010 Census
- Time zone: UTC−4 (AST)

Yaurel (Barrio Yaurel) is a barrio in the municipality of Arroyo, Puerto Rico. Its population in 2010 was 1,589.

== History ==
Yaurel was in Spain's gazetteers until Puerto Rico was ceded by Spain in the aftermath of the Spanish–American War under the terms of the Treaty of Paris of 1898 and became an unincorporated territory of the United States. In 1899, the United States Department of War conducted a census of Puerto Rico finding that the population of Yaurel barrio was 1,333.

Historical population
Census	Pop.	Note	%±
1900	1,333		—
1910	1,634		22.6%
1920	1,600		−2.1%
1930	1,820		13.8%
1940	1,912		5.1%
1950	1,900		−0.6%
1960	2,062		8.5%
1970	1,948		−5.5%
1980	2,202		13.0%
1990	2,046		−7.1%
2000	1,926		−5.9%
2010	1,589		−17.5%
U.S. Decennial Census; 1899 (shown as 1900) 1910-1930; 1930-1950 1980-2000 2010

== Special community ==
Since 2001 when law 1-2001 was passed, measures have been taken to identify and address the high levels of poverty and the lack of resources and opportunities affecting specific communities in Puerto Rico. Initially there were 686 places that made the list. By 2008, there were 742 places on the list of Comunidades especiales de Puerto Rico. The places on the list are barrios, communities, sectors, or neighborhoods and in 2004, Yaurel barrio made the list.

== See also ==
- List of communities in Puerto Rico
