= Arthur Yager =

American politician

- Arthur Yager as Governor of Puerto Rico circa 1914

Governor of Puerto Rico
- In office November 5, 1913 – May 15, 1921
- President: Woodrow Wilson
- Preceded by: George Radcliffe Colton
- Succeeded by: José E. Benedicto (acting)

Personal details
- Born: October 29, 1858 Henry County, Kentucky
- Died: December 24, 1941 (aged 83) Pewee Valley, Kentucky
- Party: Democratic Party
- Profession: Economics

Arthur Yager (October 29, 1858 – December 24, 1941) was an American academic and politician who served as the governor of Puerto Rico from 1913 to 1921. He was a professor at Georgetown College from 1884 to 1913, and president from 1908 to 1913.

== Early life and education ==
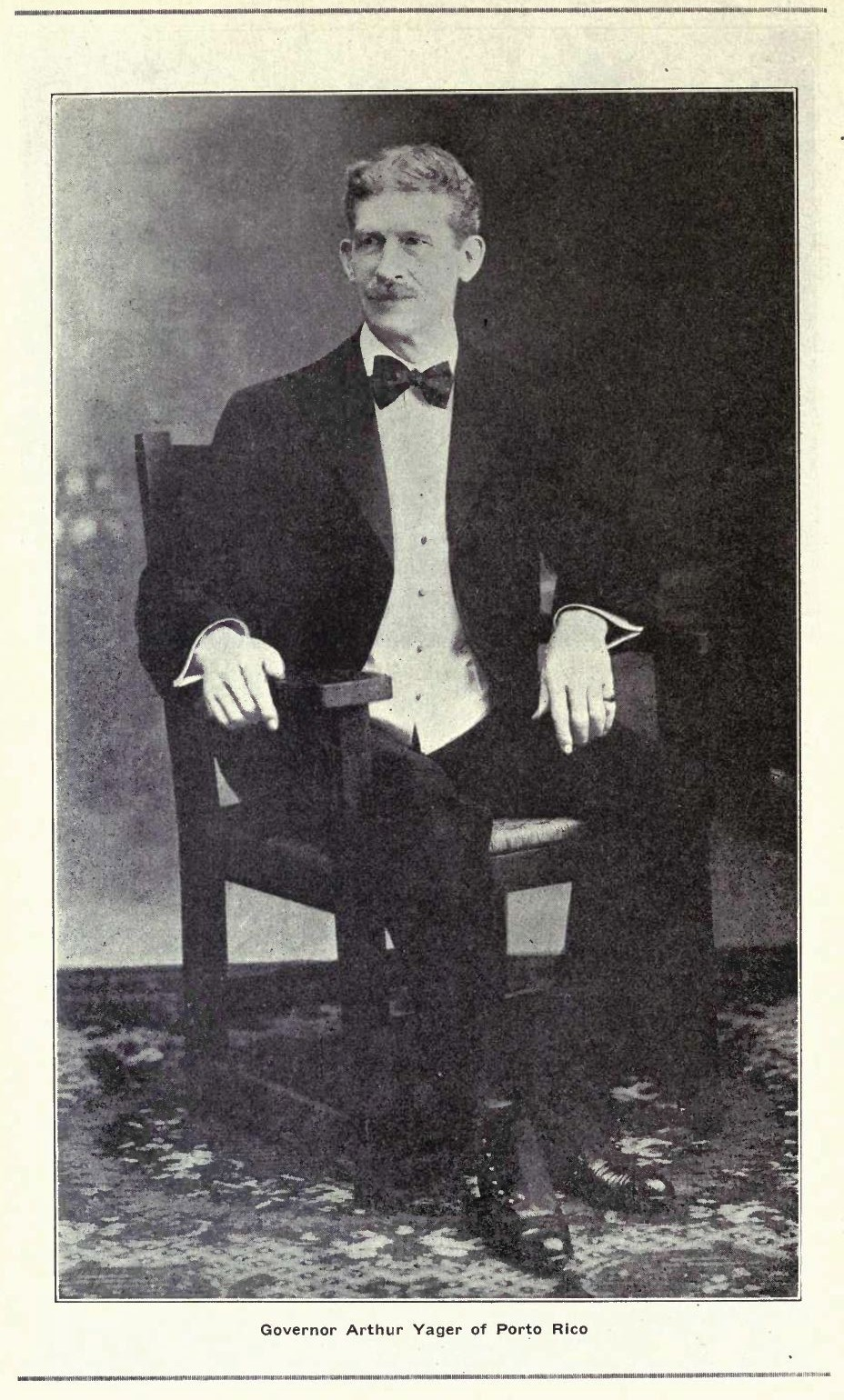
Portrait of Arthur Yager, Governor of Porto Rico from April 1919 edition of Overland Monthly

Arthur Yager was born in Henry County, Kentucky, on October 29, 1858, to Franklin Jackson Yager and Diana Smith. He graduated from Georgetown College with a bachelor's degree in 1879, and a master's degree in 1882. He graduated from Johns Hopkins University with a doctorate in 1884. He met future U.S. President Woodrow Wilson at Johns Hopkins University as both were majoring in political science and sang in the glee club.

Before 1913 Yager was rarely aware from Georgetown College except for the two years he spent at Johns Hopkins University. He was a professor of history, economics, and political science at Georgetown from 1884 to 1913, and the president from 1908 to 1913. Doctor of Laws degrees were awarded to Yager by Howard College in 1905, University of Puerto Rico in 1917, and Georgetown in 1921.

== Governor ==
Wilson appointed Yager as governor of Puerto Rico in 1913.

Yager, who supported self-government by Puerto Ricans, pushed for the passage of the Jones–Shafroth Act in 1917. This act granted American citizenship to Puerto Ricans.

The Puerto Rican legislature passed a resolution asking President Warren G. Harding to keep Yager as governor, but Harding appointed Emmet Montgomery Reily. At the end of his tenure Yager was the longest serving governor of Puerto Rico at that point.

== Later life ==
Yager returned to Louisville in 1921, and worked as a visiting lecturer. He ran for a seat in the United States House of Representatives from Kentucky's 5th congressional district in 1928, but lost. He supported Al Smith during the 1928 presidential election.

== Personal life ==
Yager married Estell Lewis, with whom he had four children. He died in Pewee Valley, Kentucky, on December 24, 1941.

== Works cited ==
=== Journals ===
- Huffman, Noah. "Arthur Yager". The Filson. 6 (3). The Filson Historical Society. Archived from the original on 2026-05-31.

=== News ===
- "Dr. Arthur Yager Dies At 87 After Illness". Courier Journal. December 25, 1941. p. 1 – via Newspapers.com.

=== Web ===
- "Papers of Governor Yager". Rutgers University. Archived from the original on May 31, 2026.

Preceded by George Radcliffe Colton	Governor of Puerto Rico; 1913-1921	Succeeded by José E. Benedicto (Acting)
