= Palmas, Arroyo, Puerto Rico =

Barrio of Puerto Rico

Palmas
- Barrio
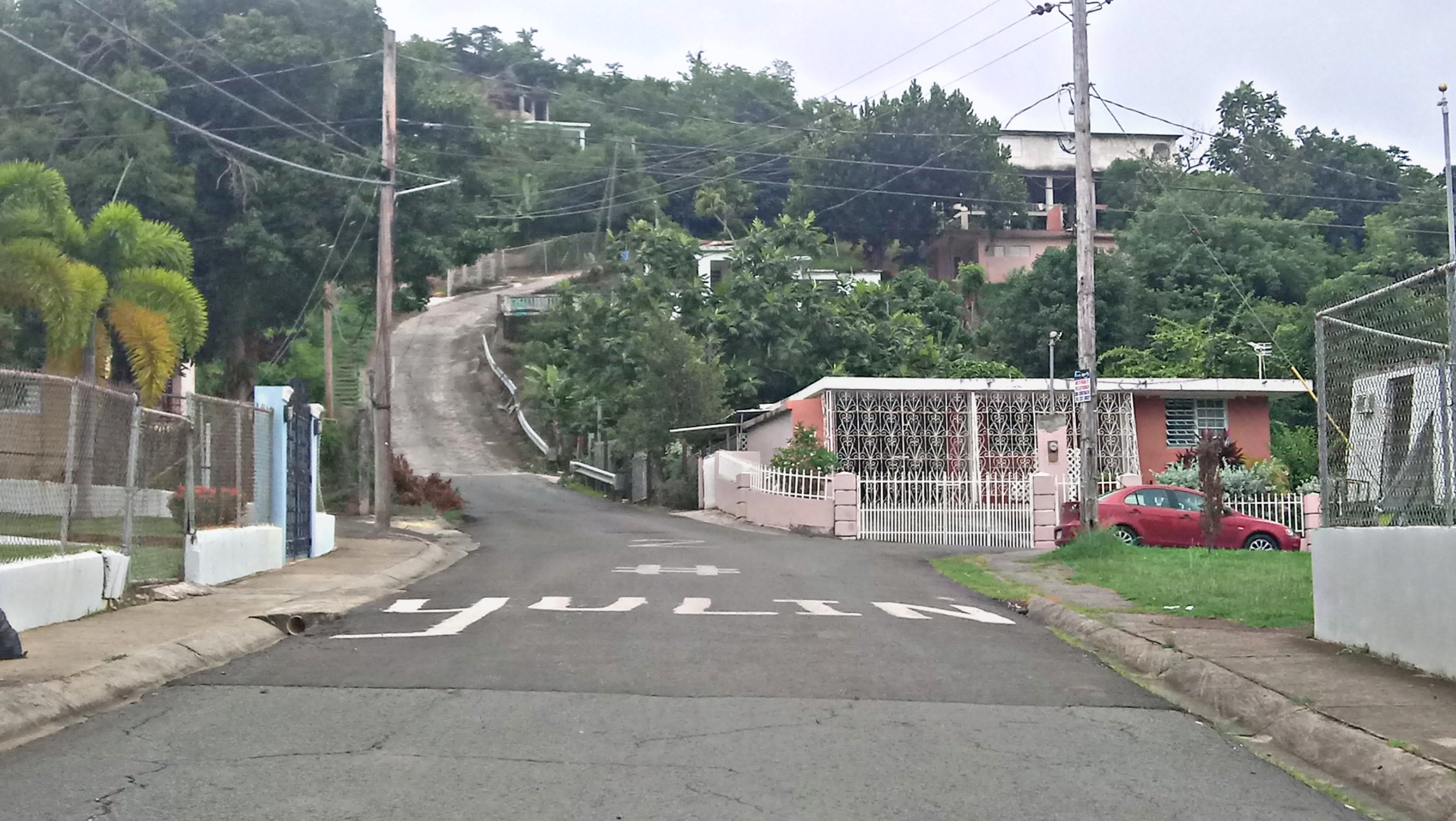
- Street in Palmas

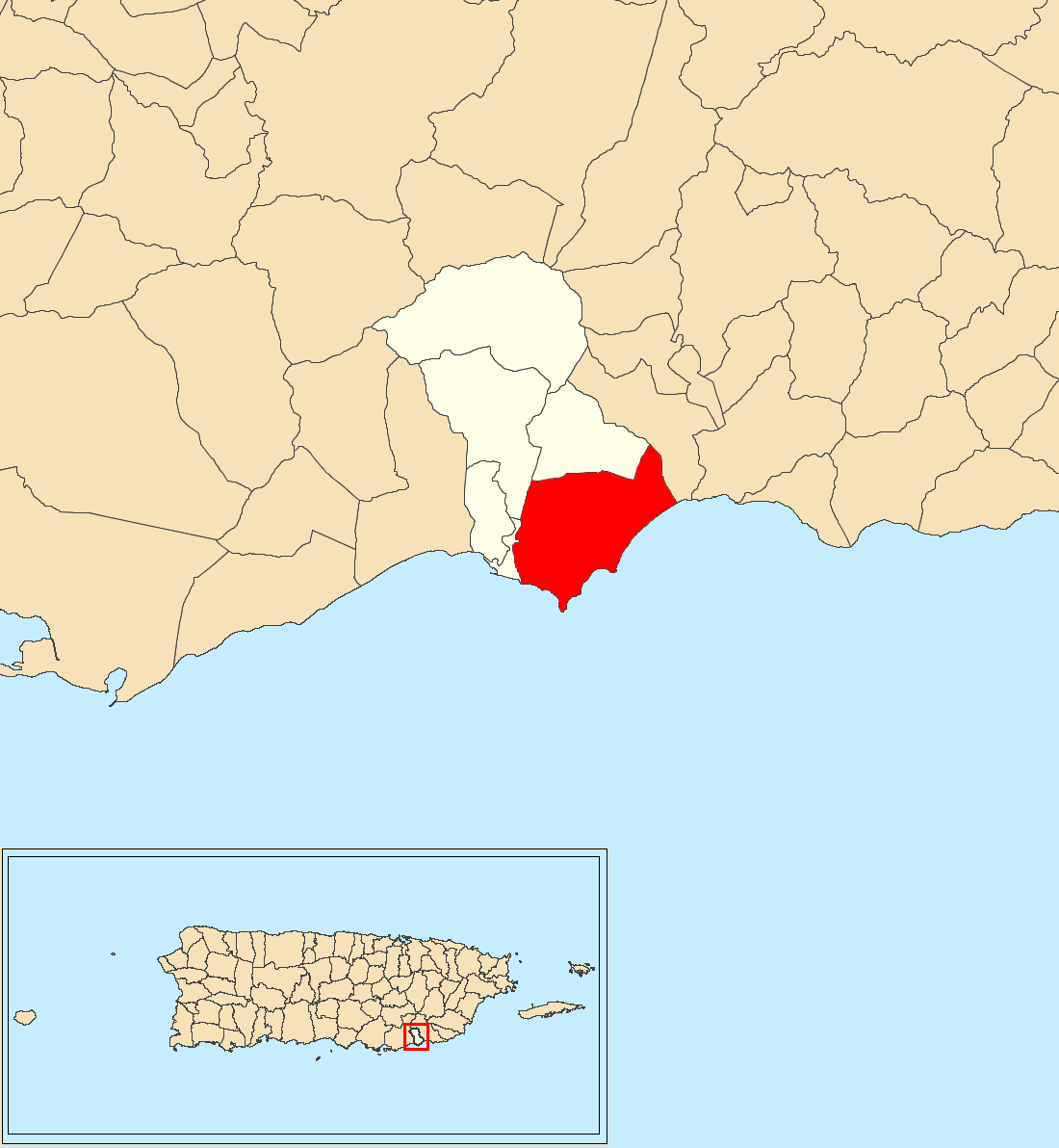
- Location of Palmas within the municipality of Arroyo shown in red

- Location of Puerto Rico
- Coordinates: 17°58′19″N 66°02′31″W
- Commonwealth: Puerto Rico
- Municipality: Arroyo

Area
  - Total: 4.74 sq mi (12.3 km^{2})
  - Land: 3.86 sq mi (10.0 km^{2})
  - Water: 0.88 sq mi (2.3 km^{2})
- Elevation: 10 ft (3.0 m)

Population (2010)
  - Total: 3,789
  - Density: 471.2/sq mi (181.9/km^{2})
- Source: 2010 Census
- Time zone: UTC−4 (AST)

Palmas is a barrio in the municipality of Arroyo, Puerto Rico. Its population in 2010 was 3,789.

== History ==
Palmas was in Spain's gazetteers until Puerto Rico was ceded by Spain in the aftermath of the Spanish–American War under the terms of the Treaty of Paris of 1898 and became an unincorporated territory of the United States. In 1899, the United States Department of War conducted a census of Puerto Rico finding that combined the population of Palmas, Ancones and Guásimas barrios was 596.

Historical population
| Census | Pop. | Note | %± |
|---|---|---|---|
| 1910 | 481 | | — |
| 1920 | 580 | | 20.6% |
| 1930 | 656 | | 13.1% |
| 1940 | 1,247 | | 90.1% |
| 1950 | 1,398 | | 12.1% |
| 1960 | 1,780 | | 27.3% |
| 1970 | 1,289 | | −27.6% |
| 1980 | 2,361 | | 83.2% |
| 1990 | 3,167 | | 34.1% |
| 2000 | 4,090 | | 29.1% |
| 2010 | 3,789 | | −7.4% |
U.S. Decennial Census; 1900 (N/A) 1910-1930; 1930-1950 1980-2000 2010

== Special Community ==
Since 2001 when law 1-2001 was passed, measures have been taken to identify and address the high levels of poverty and the lack of resources and opportunities affecting specific communities in Puerto Rico. By 2008, there were 742 places on the list of Comunidades especiales de Puerto Rico of barrios, communities, sectors, or neighborhoods and in 2004, Palmas barrio made the list.

== Gallery ==
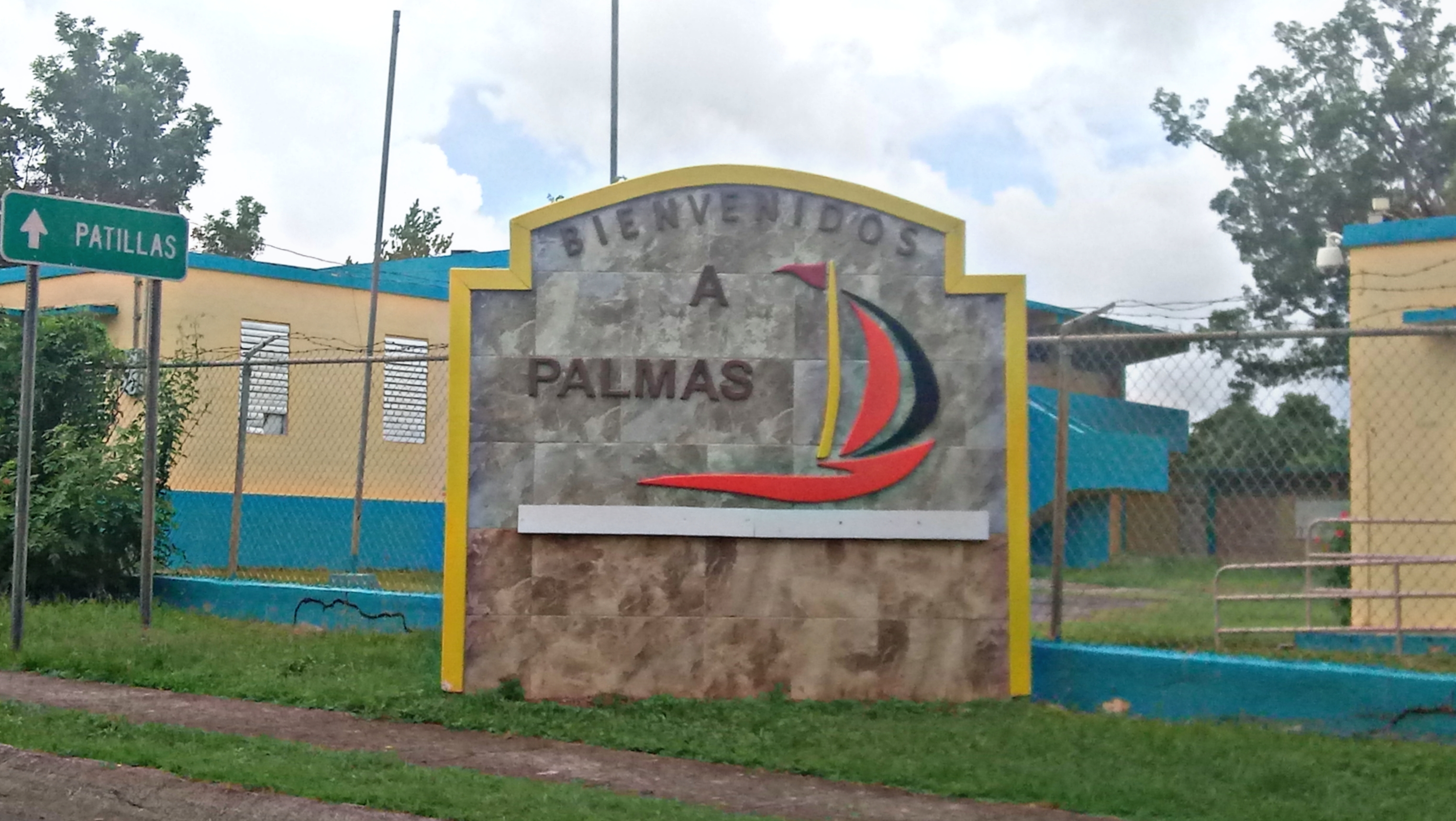
Welcome to Palmas sign

== See also ==
- List of communities in Puerto Rico
