= Regis Henri Post =

American politician (1870–1944)

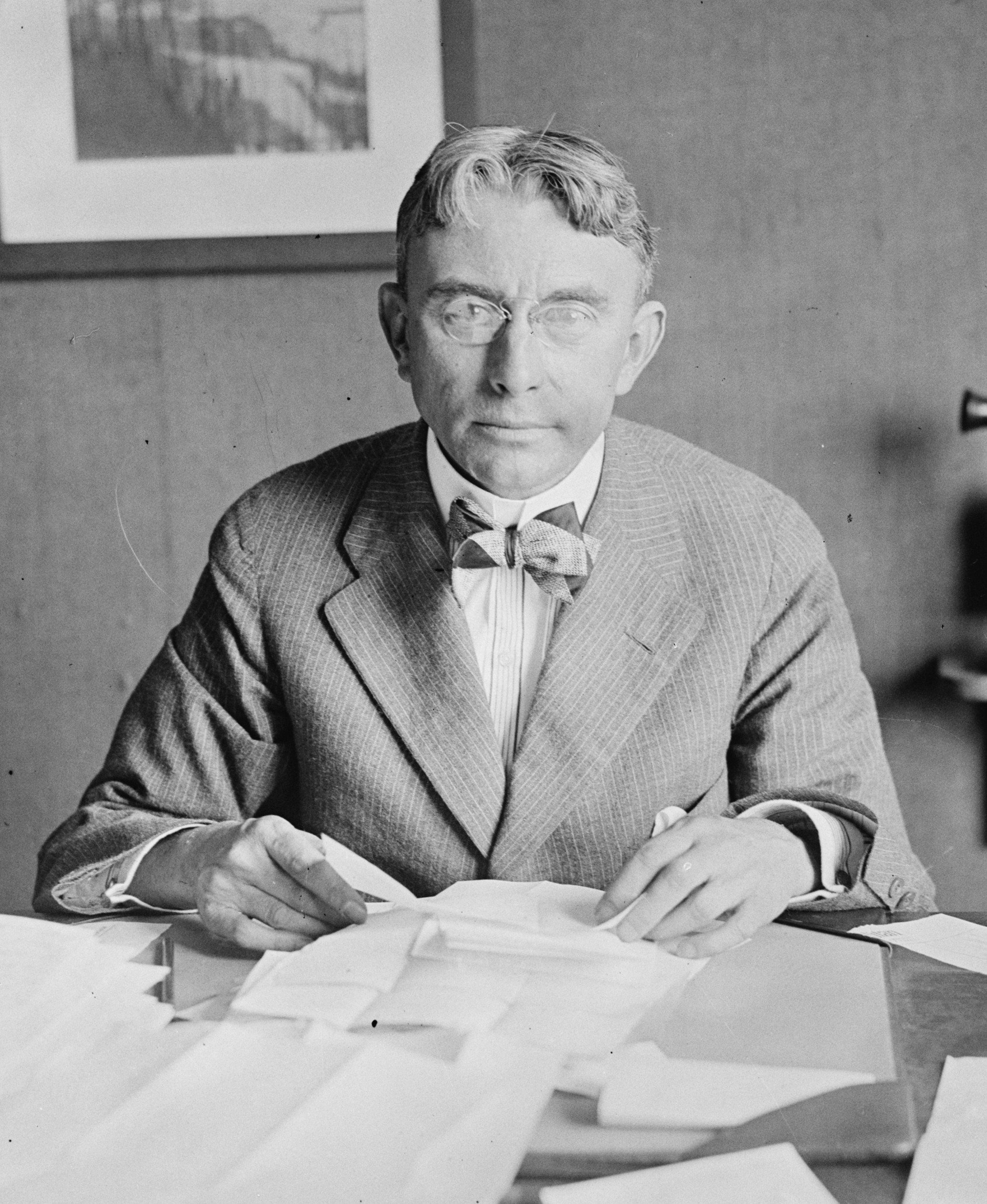
Post, c. 1915–1920

Regis Henri Post (January 28, 1870 – October 5, 1944) was a New York politician and the governor of Puerto Rico from April 17, 1907, to November 6, 1909. He was born in Suffolk County, New York.

== Life ==
Post was born in Bayport, New York, the son of Albert Kintzing Post (1843-1872) and Marie Post (née de Trobriand, 1845-1926). His maternal grandfather was Régis de Trobriand. He had an older sister, Lina Post Webster, and an older brother, Waldron Kintzing Post Sr. His father drowned at the age of 29 on Long Island when Regis was only two. His mother remarried to his father's 2nd cousin once removed, Charles Alfred Post (1844-1921). Regis had two step-sisters from this union, Beatrice Post Candler and Edith Post Gallatin. Post graduated from Harvard University in 1891 where he was a member of The Delphic Club.

He was a member of the New York State Assembly (Suffolk Co., 2nd D.) in 1899 and 1900.

He was appointed by President Theodore Roosevelt as Auditor of Puerto Rico in 1903, as Secretary of Puerto Rico in 1904, and as governor in 1907. Post held the office of governor from April 18, 1907, to November 5, 1909. His governorship was extremely controversial, as his frequent disagreements with the Puerto Rico Legislature led to the Legislature's failure to pass any budget in 1909, resulting in a political crisis on the island and passage of the Olmsted Amendment at the request of President William Howard Taft.

Following Post's time in Puerto Rico, he worked with the American Ambulance Corps in France from 1913 to 1914. He joined the American Red Cross in 1917.

== Personal life ==
He married Carolyn Beatrice Post, daughter of Colonel Henry A. V. Post and his 2nd cousin once removed, on March 6, 1895. They had a son, Regis Henri Post Jr.(February 17, 1897). In 1916, Post was discovered by his wife having an affair and they separated. She filed for divorce in 1922. He married Leila Ellis in 1925. She died in 1931. Post married thirdly Marguerite Denis de Lagarde on April 5, 1933. She was his distant cousin. Marguerite's great-niece through her sister was Mimi Lee.

Regis H. Post served as The Sayville Yacht Club’s 3rd Commodore 1911-1912 following John E. Roosevelt 1901-1907 and John R. Suydam 1908-1910.

== Death ==
Post died October 5, 1944, in Nantucket, Massachusetts, at the age of 74. He left behind his wife, Marguertie, and his son, Regis H. Post, Jr.

== Relations ==
Regis was part of the Post political family. His great-great-grandfather was Jotham Post, Jr., a United States Representative from New York and an assemblyman. His nephew was New York State assemblyman Langdon W. Post, and his distant cousin was New York State assemblyman Erastus F. Post. His sister, Lina Post Webster, married Hamilton Fish Webster, a grandson of Hamilton Fish. His step-sister, Edith Post Gallatin, married Goelet Gallatin, a great-grandson of Albert Gallatin, great-grandson of Elbridge Gerry, and first cousin of Peter Goelet Gerry.

== Sources ==
- SPOUSE SUES EX-GOVERNOR.; Says He Was Too Fond of Pretty Domestics; Forgiveness Oft Given for Twenty-seven Years; Gubernatorial Laundress is Mentioned in Suit. The Los Angeles Times . Los Angeles, Calif.: Feb 13, 1922. pg. II1, 1 pgs

New York State Assembly
Preceded by Carll S. Burr Jr.	New York State Assembly; Suffolk County, 2nd District; 1899—1900	Succeeded by George A. Robinson
Political offices
Preceded by Beekman Winthrop	Governor of Puerto Rico; April 17, 1907 – November 6, 1909	Succeeded by George Radcliffe Colton
