= George Radcliffe Colton =

American politician (1865–1916)

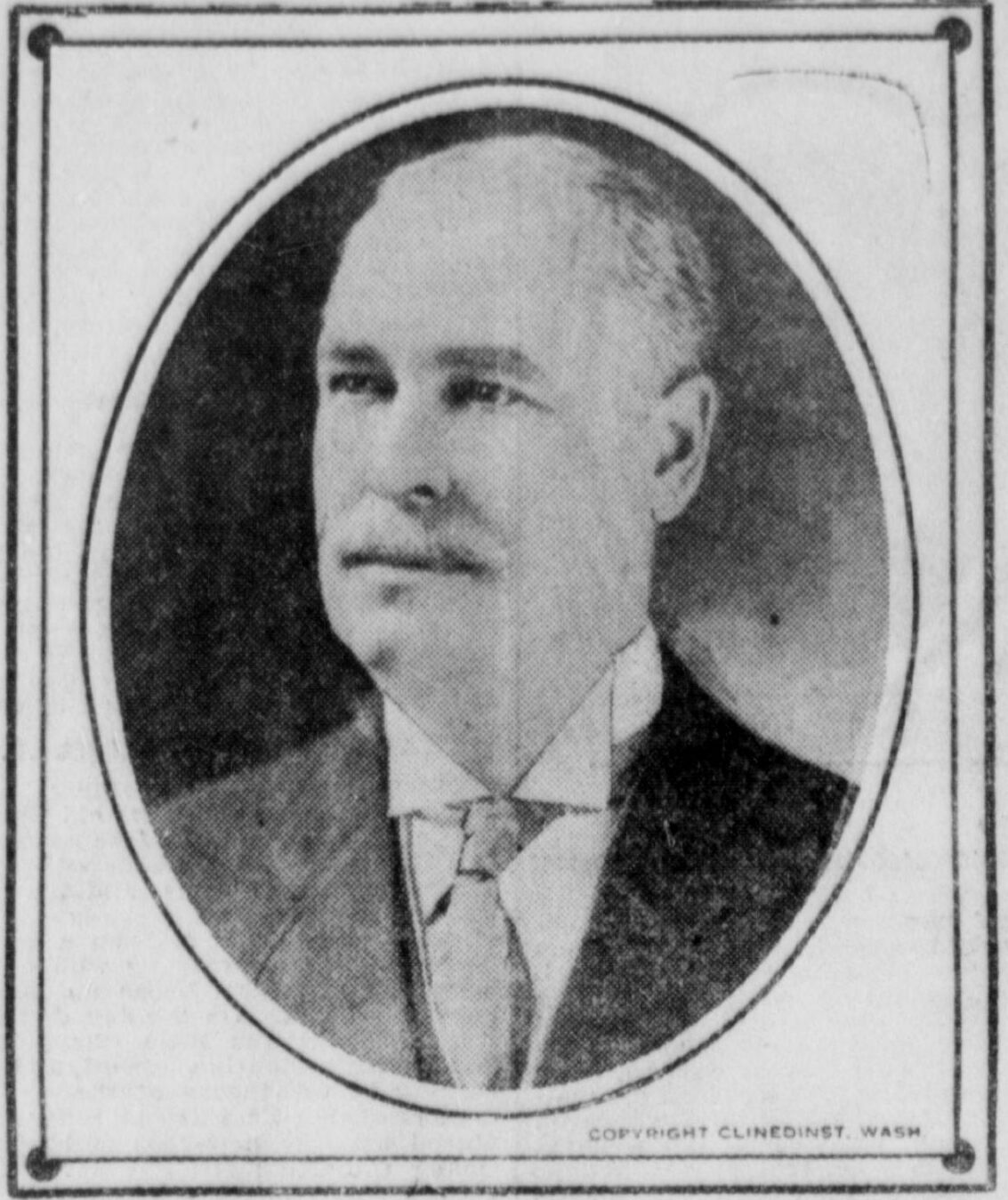

Governor of Puerto Rico
- In office November 6, 1909 – November 15, 1913
- Preceded by: Regis Henri Post
- Succeeded by: Arthur Yager

Personal details
- Born: April 10, 1865 Galesburg, Illinois, U.S.
- Died: April 6, 1916 (aged 50) Washington, D.C., U.S.
- Resting place: Oak Hill Cemetery
- Spouse: Jessie T. McLeod (died)
- Children: 2
- Education: Knox College
- Occupation: Politician; banker; civil servant

George Radcliffe Colton (April 10, 1865 – April 6, 1916) was an American politician and civil servant. He served in the Nebraska House of Representatives and as governor of Puerto Rico from November 6, 1909, to November 15, 1913, a position to which he was appointed by President William Howard Taft.

== Early life ==
George Radcliffe Colton was born on April 10, 1865, in Galesburg, Illinois, to Francis Colton. His father was a bank president, diplomat and railroad financier. He attended Knox College.

== Career ==
In the 1880s he was a rancher in New Territory. Colton organized the Central Nebraska National Bank in David City, Nebraska, in 1887. He served as vice president of the bank from its organization until January 1, 1889, when he became cashier. He remained cashier until his resignation on February 15, 1898. He then worked as national bank examiner for a few months. He served in the Nebraska House of Representatives from 1889 to 1890. He served as a colonel in the National Guard. He served as a lieutenant colonel of the First Regiment of the Nebraska Volunteers of the United States Army in the Philippine–American War from May 1898 to 1899.

In August 1899, he joined the customs service in the Philippines as a deputy collector. He later became a collector of customs in Iloilo. In 1905, he was chosen to organize the Dominican customs service and served in the Dominican Republic as a U.S. receiver. In 1907, he was appointed as collector of customs in Manila. In 1909, he returned to the United States to help in the revision of tariff laws with the Philippines. Colton was appointed as governor of Puerto Rico in December 1909. He held the office until his resignation on November 5, 1913. After his retirement, he focused on his property interests in South America and returned to the United States to work in business.

== Personal life ==
Colton married Jessie T. McLeod on October 16, 1889. They had two sons, Francis and George. His wife predeceased him.

According to the 1910 U.S. Census of Puerto Rico, Colton lived in barrio Catedral on Allen Street (Calle de Allen). He lived there with his sister Margarite Colton and three servants. He later lived in Connecticut and by the time of his death, he had moved in with his sister in Washington, D.C.

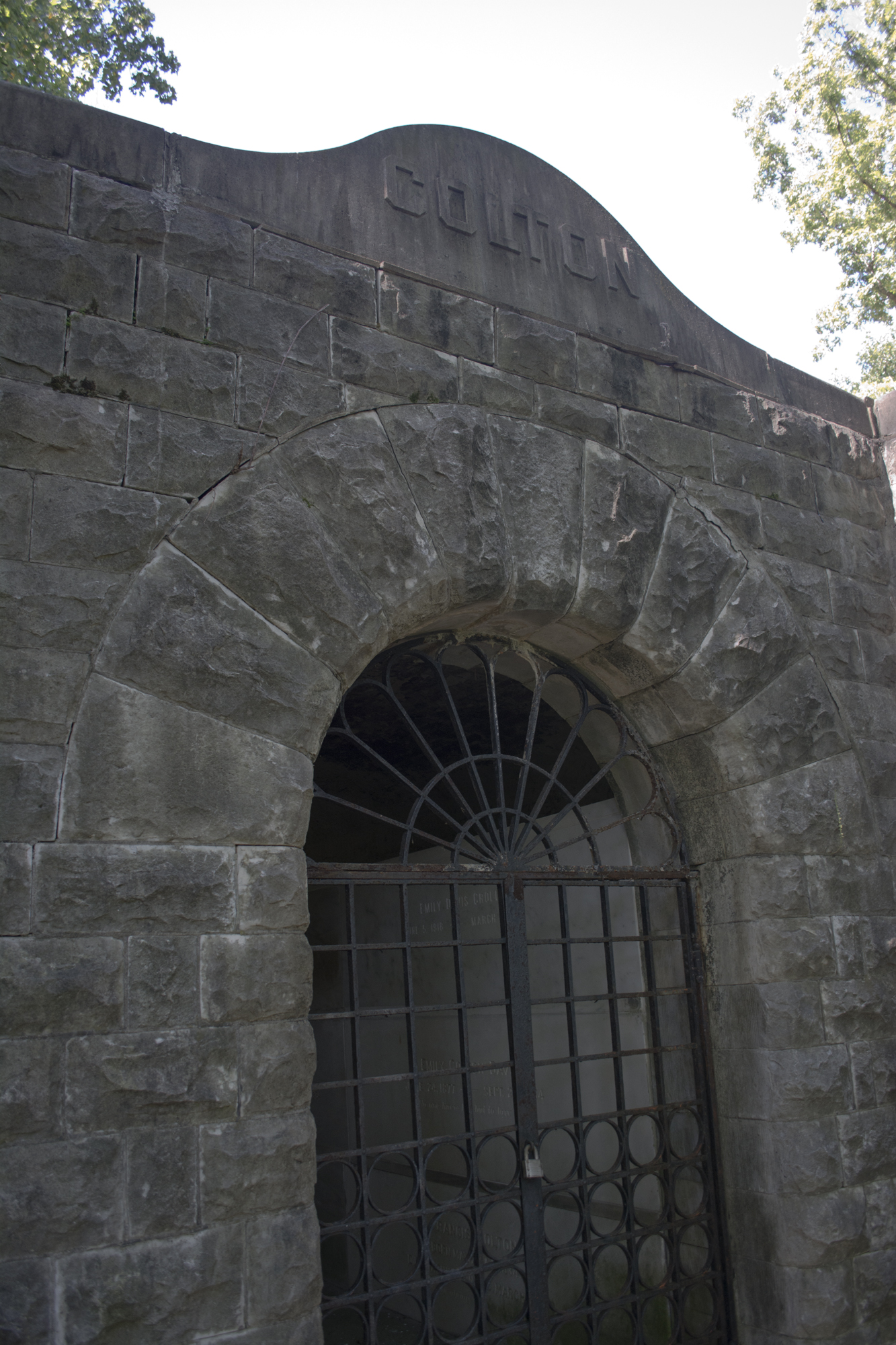
Mausoleum in Oak Hill Cemetery holding the remains of Colton

Colton died on April 6, 1916, at Walter Reed Army Medical Center in Washington, D.C. He was buried in Oak Hill Cemetery.

== See also ==
- LAST MOST BRILLIANT; Army and Navy Reception at the White House. THREE THOUSAND INVITATIONS Larger Number of Guests Than Were Present on Previous Occasions This Season—President and Mrs. Roosevelt Assisted by Members of the Cabinet and Ladies of Their Households. The Washington Post. Washington, D.C.: Feb 17, 1905. pg. 9, 1 pgs

== Notes ==
Preceded by Regis Henri Post	Governor of Puerto Rico; November 6, 1909 – November 5, 1913	Succeeded by Arthur Yager
