= Olmsted Amendment =

Modification to the Foraker Act of 1900

The Olmsted Amendment was a modification to the Foraker Act of 1900, and became law on July 16, 1909. The law was designed to modify several perceived weaknesses in Puerto Rico's government at the request of President William Howard Taft and Governor Regis Henri Post.

It was the Foraker Act that established the United States controlled civilian government on the island of Puerto Rico after the Spanish–American War. The act also regulated the political and economic relationship between Puerto Rico and the U.S. Nevertheless, the Olmsted Amendment was passed by both houses of U.S. Congress in response to a governmental crisis in Puerto Rico in early 1909, as a result of which the Legislature of Puerto Rico failed to pass a budget.

The amendment stated that whenever the Puerto Rican legislature adjourned without consensus about appropriations for the support of the government, the sums appropriated from the previous year would be considered appropriate. The act also placed the supervision of Puerto Rican affairs in the jurisdiction of an executive department to be designated by the president. The discussions of the bill provoked the first Congressional debate on the island's form of government since 1900.

Although the Amendment's supporters in the Administration and Congress perceived it as a pragmatic step to deal with the failure to adopt a budget for Puerto Rico, many Puerto Rican political leaders considered it a retrograde step in the island's struggle toward greater self-government.

== Resources ==
- Olmsted Amendment
