= Guásimas, Arroyo, Puerto Rico =

Barrio of Puerto Rico

Guásimas
- Barrio
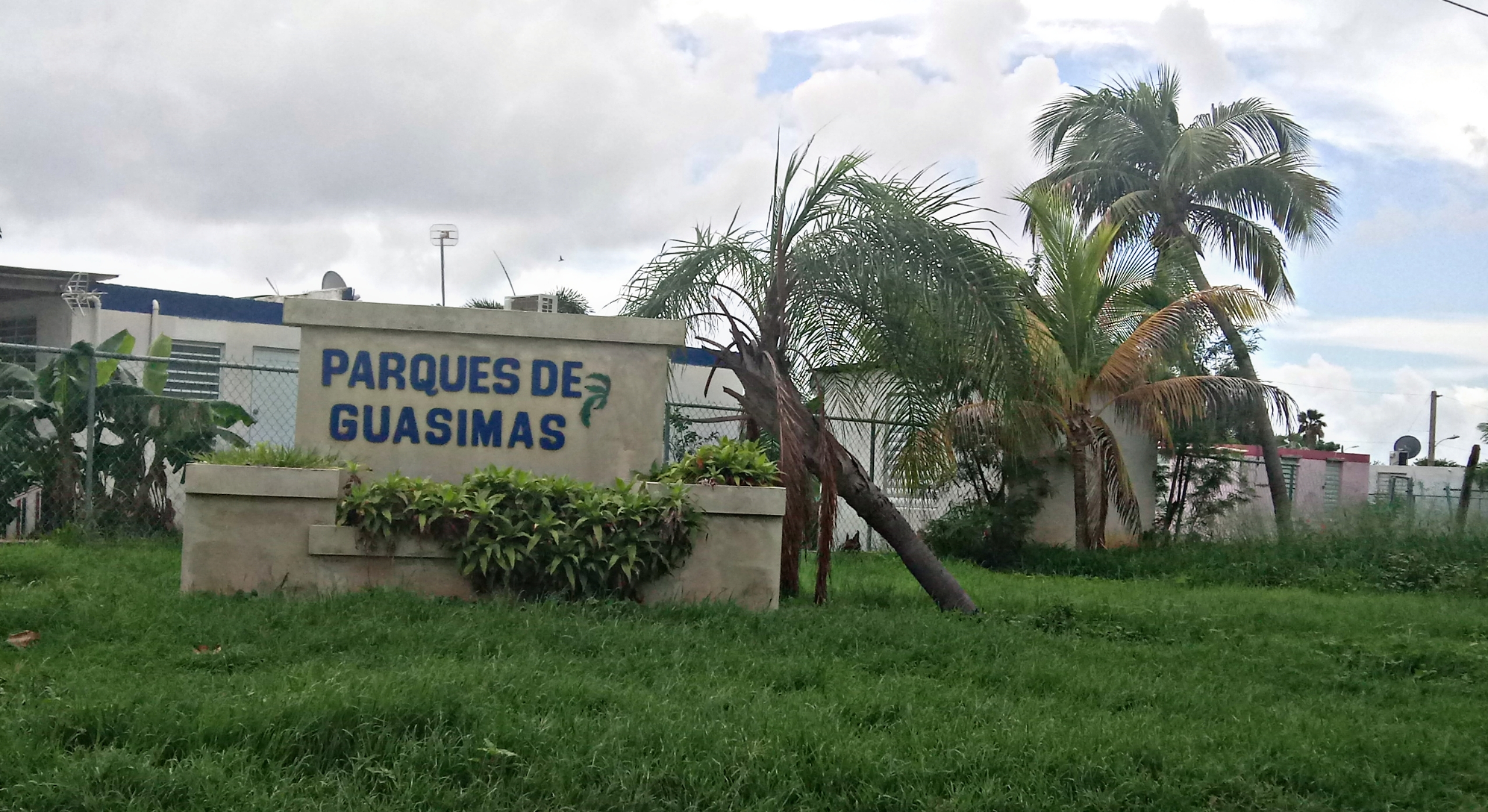
- Urbanización Parques de Guásimas in Guásimas

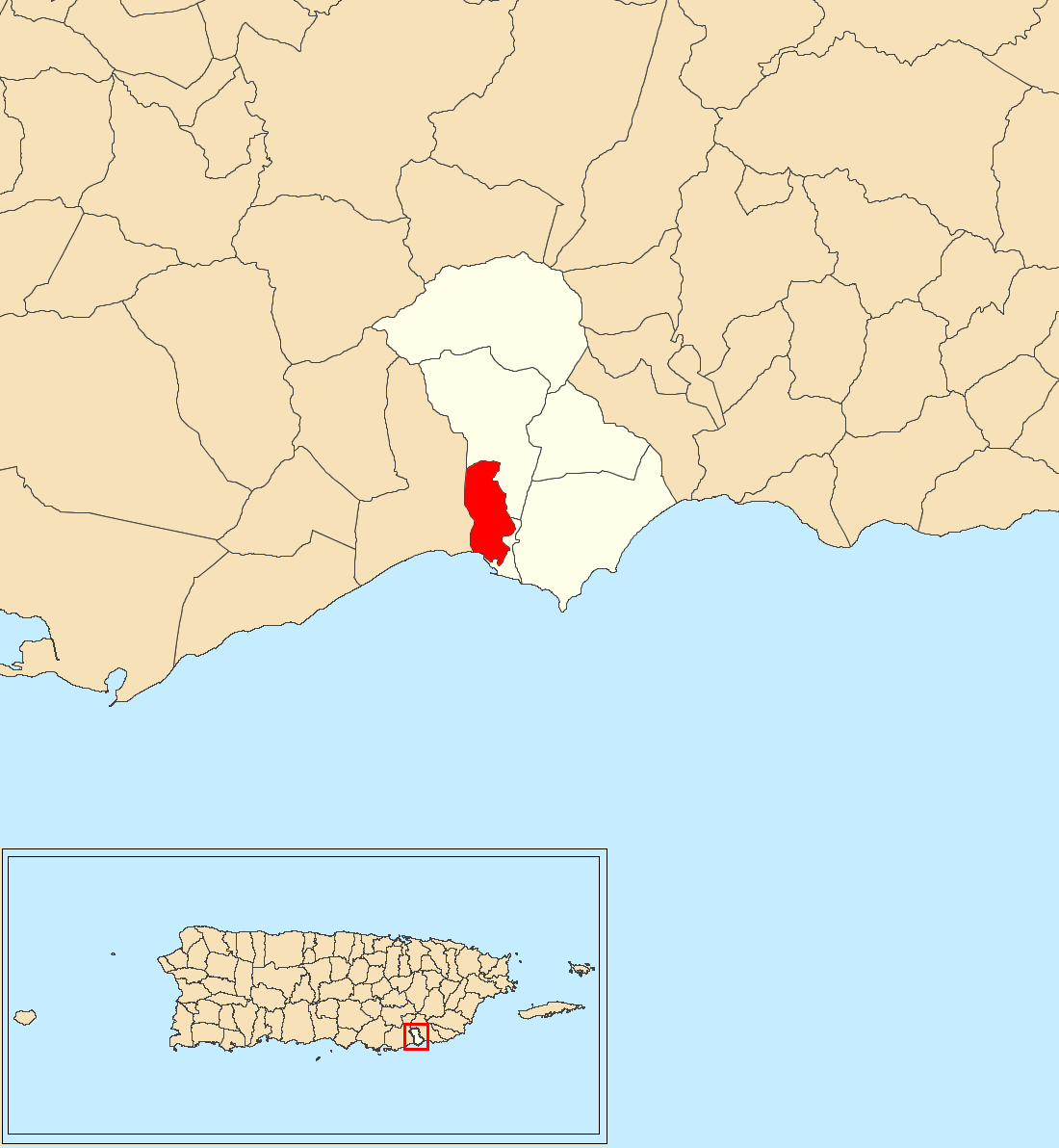
- Location of Guásimas within the municipality of Arroyo shown in red

- Location of Puerto Rico
- Coordinates: 17°58′34″N 66°04′01″W
- Commonwealth: Puerto Rico
- Municipality: Arroyo

Area
  - Total: 0.97 sq mi (2.5 km^{2})
  - Land: 0.95 sq mi (2.5 km^{2})
  - Water: 0.02 sq mi (0.052 km^{2})
- Elevation: 52 ft (16 m)

Population (2010)
  - Total: 4,030
  - Density: 1,854.7/sq mi (716.1/km^{2})
- Source: 2010 Census
- Time zone: UTC−4 (AST)

Guásimas is a barrio in the municipality of Arroyo, Puerto Rico. Its population in 2010 was 4,030.

== History ==
Guásimas was in Spain's gazetteers until Puerto Rico was ceded by Spain in the aftermath of the Spanish–American War under the terms of the Treaty of Paris of 1898 and became an unincorporated territory of the United States. In 1899, the United States Department of War conducted a census of Puerto Rico finding that the combined population of Guásimas, Palmas, and Ancones barrios was 596.

Historical population
Census	Pop.	Note	%±
1910	319		—
1920	426		33.5%
1930	451		5.9%
1940	527		16.9%
1950	489		−7.2%
1960	1,161		137.4%
1970	0		−100.0%
1980	4,759		—
1990	4,607		−3.2%
2000	3,747		−18.7%
2010	4,030		7.6%
U.S. Decennial Census; 1900 (N/A) 1910-1930; 1930-1950 1980-2000 2010

== See also ==
- List of communities in Puerto Rico
