= José E. Benedicto =

Puerto Rican politician (1880–1924)

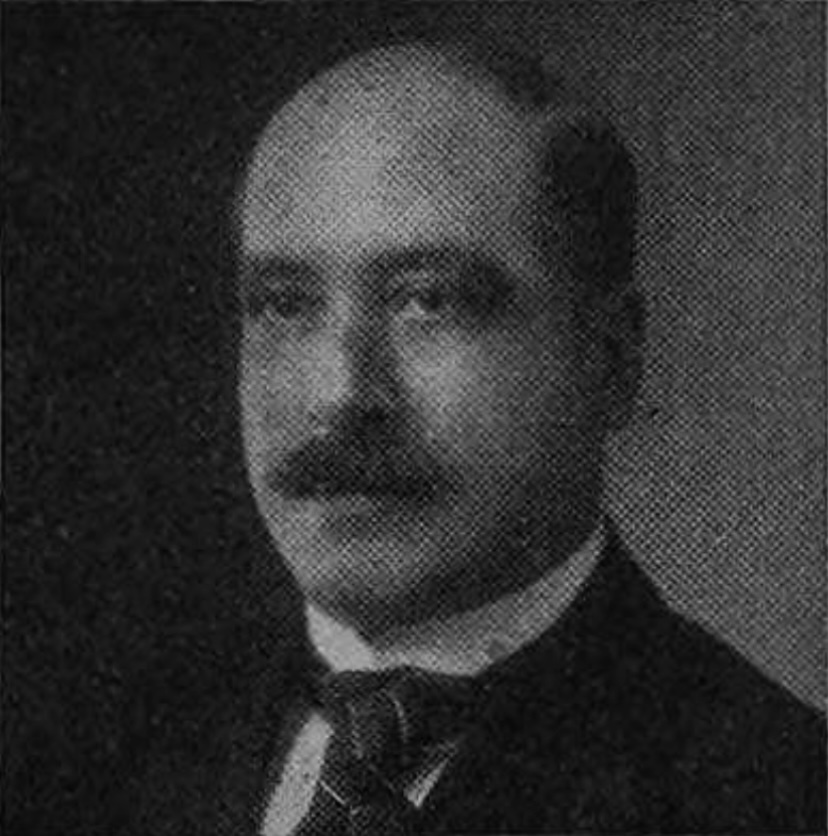
- Benedicto, c. 1923

Acting Governor of Puerto Rico
- In office May 15, 1921 – July 30, 1921
- Preceded by: Arthur Yager
- Succeeded by: E. Mont Reily

Treasurer of Puerto Rico
- In office 1917–1922
- Governor: Arthur Yager; E. Mont Reily
- Preceded by: Position established
- Succeeded by: Ramón Aboy

Dean of the University of Puerto Rico School of Law
- In office 1913–1917

Personal details
- Born: March 21, 1880 San Juan, Puerto Rico
- Died: July 24, 1924 (aged 44) San Juan, Puerto Rico
- Education: University of Madrid (BA); University of Michigan, Ann Arbor (LLB)

José Eladio Benedicto y Geigel (March 21, 1880 – July 24, 1924) was the Treasurer of Puerto Rico, and briefly served as acting governor of Puerto Rico in 1921.

== Biography ==
In his early life, Benedicto attended the University of Madrid, where he received a Bachelor of Arts degree. In 1902, he graduated with a law degree from the University of Michigan Law School and was licensed to practice in Michigan and Puerto Rico. He subsequently was appointed as a district attorney of Arecibo, Puerto Rico. He also worked as a law professor at the University of Puerto Rico.

In 1908, he was appointed as treasurer. During World War I, Benedicto was partly responsible for a campaign to advertise the sale of Liberty Bonds on the island. This plan would ultimately bring in nearly $10 million for the war effort, or approximately $9 per person in the territory. As treasurer, he also fought a legal battle against the Porto Rican American Tobacco Company. This battle eventually made it to the Supreme Court of the United States and they issued an opinion favoring the treasurer in 1924.

Shortly after Emmet Montgomery Reily was appointed as governor, Benedicto was indicted by a grand jury on corruption charges and was removed as treasurer by the governor in 1921. However, he was later acquitted of charges.

Political offices
New office	Treasurer of Puerto Rico; 1917–1922	Succeeded by Ramón Aboy
Preceded by Arthur Yager	Governor of Puerto Rico; Acting; May 15 - July 30, 1921	Succeeded by Mont Reily
Academic offices
New office	Dean of the University of Puerto Rico School of Law; 1913-1917	Succeeded by Rafael Martínez Álvarez
