= Emmet Montgomery Reily =

Governor of Puerto Rico

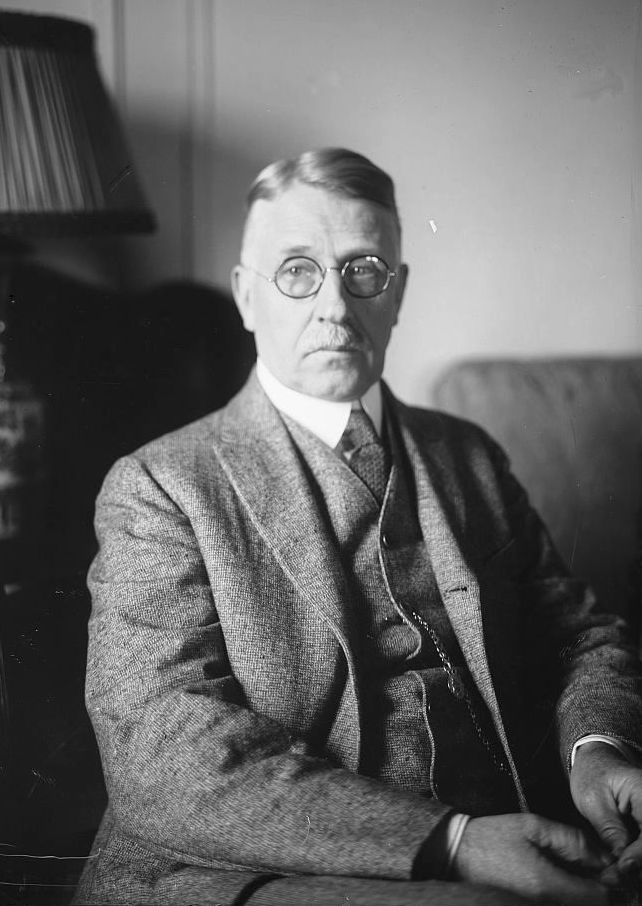
- Hon. E.M. Reily

Governor of Puerto Rico
- In office July 30, 1921 – February 16, 1923
- President: Warren G. Harding
- Preceded by: José E. Benedicto (acting)
- Succeeded by: Juan Bernardo Huyke (acting)

Personal details
- Born: Emmet Montgomery Reily; October 21, 1866 Sedalia, Missouri
- Died: October 31, 1954 (aged 88) Jackson City, Missouri
- Party: Republican
- Profession: businessman

Emmet Montgomery Reily (October 21, 1866 – October 31, 1954), sometimes E. Mont Reily was a Texas and, later, Missouri politician who served a number of local offices, especially in Fort Worth and Kansas City. He was active in the Republican Party. He was later appointed as the governor of Puerto Rico by President Warren G. Harding.

== Missouri/Texas career ==
Reily was born in Sedalia, Missouri, but moved to Fort Worth, Texas, as a teenager, where he worked both in the newspaper and real estate businesses. During this time, he first became active in local politics and was appointed as the chairman of the Republican City Committee (which he served on for eight years) and the Republican County Committee, as well as being twice nominated for County Clerk. (However, he never won that office.)

In 1892, Reily went to Kansas City and was appointed Secretary to the Mayor for two terms. Following that, he returned to private life but was subsequently appointed as Chief Deputy to the County Assessor. In 1902, he was appointed as the assistant postmaster for Kansas City.

In 1901, Reily founded the Roosevelt Club, which had a stated goal of nominating Vice President Theodore Roosevelt for President in the 1904 elections. The group was disbanded when Roosevelt became president after the assassination of William McKinley in September of that year.

As a newspaper editor in Kansas City, Reily was said to be the first prominent figure to endorse Warren G. Harding for the office of President of the United States. When Harding was elected president in 1920, he is said to have sought an appointive office to which he could nominate Reily as a reward for his loyalty without giving him too much power or presence in Washington.

== Puerto Rico ==
On July 30, 1921, President Harding nominated Reily as Governor of Puerto Rico. During his time in office, he was a strong supporter of "Americanism", the introduction of some aspects of mainland United States culture and their advancement over native Puerto Rican culture. During his inauguration address, he insisted that the United States flag ("Old Glory") should be the only flag used over the island. Additionally, he placed several mainland politicians in prominent positions in the Puerto Rican government.

Although Reily was a strong proponent of "Americanism", he reportedly saw Spanish culture—such as that of Texas, Florida, and California—as part of this culture. During his term as governor, Spanish Renaissance Revival became the "official" architectural style of the territory for public buildings, and the new Puerto Rico Capitol Building was erected in that style.

During his time in office, Reily advocated reducing the use of Spanish in schools in favor of teaching exclusively in English.

Reily was an extremely unpopular governor. A common nickname for him, given by the Puerto Rican populace, was "Moncho Reyes", a name closely resembling Reily's and giving the impression ("Moncho" being a common countryside nickname for the name "Ramón") that Reily was an uncivilized hick. He became involved in disputes with numerous political factions in Puerto Rico, some of which called for his removal from office. Reily reported, in a letter to Harding, that he had received death threats. He was also the subject of corruption allegations and an investigation by Puerto Rican local officials.

Under pressure to leave office, and suffering from an illness he had contracted during a return visit to the continental United States, Reily resigned as governor on February 16, 1923. He was succeeded by the U.S. Representative Horace Mann Towner, the Chairman of the House Committee on Insular Affairs, which had jurisdiction over Puerto Rico.

A collection of original correspondence between Reily and President Harding is archived in the Manuscripts Division of the New York Public Library.

Preceded by José E. Benedicto (Acting)	Governor of Puerto Rico; July 30, 1921 – February 16, 1923	Succeeded by Juan Bernardo Huyke (Acting)
