= Carmen Bozello y Guzmán =

Puerto Rican writer

- Born: 1856; Arroyo, Puerto Rico
- Died: February 10, 1885; Arroyo, Puerto Rico
- Citizenship: Puerto Rico Spain
- Occupation: writer

Carmen Bozello y Guzmán (1856 - 1885) was a Puerto Rican writer, best known for her work "Abnegación y sacrificio - comedia en 2 actos y en prosa".

== Biography ==
Cover of Abnegación y Sacrificio

Carmen Bozello y Guzmán was the daughter of the l architect Juan Bozello, who had raised numerous churches across many parts of Puerto Rico. Her spouse - don Enrique Huyke also greatly influenced Carmen. She was born and died in her hometown - Arroyo.

=== Abnegación y sacrificio ===
Abnegación y sacrificio received praise in the year of its publishing in 1876. The majority of the high society in Puerto Rico celebrated Guzman's writing. She received numerous awards during the same year and the year thereafter.

Scholars deem the work of Carmen Bozello y Guzmán culturally important and has been announced to be free to copy and distribute in the name of preservation. Since the current version of Guzmán's work has been reproduced by being based on the original artifact, it has some pages missing.

Carmen Bozello y Guzmán died on February 10, 1885, in Arroyo, Puerto Rico. She was buried at the Arroyo Municipal Cemetery.
