= Pitahaya, Arroyo, Puerto Rico =

Barrio of Puerto Rico

Pitahaya
- Barrio
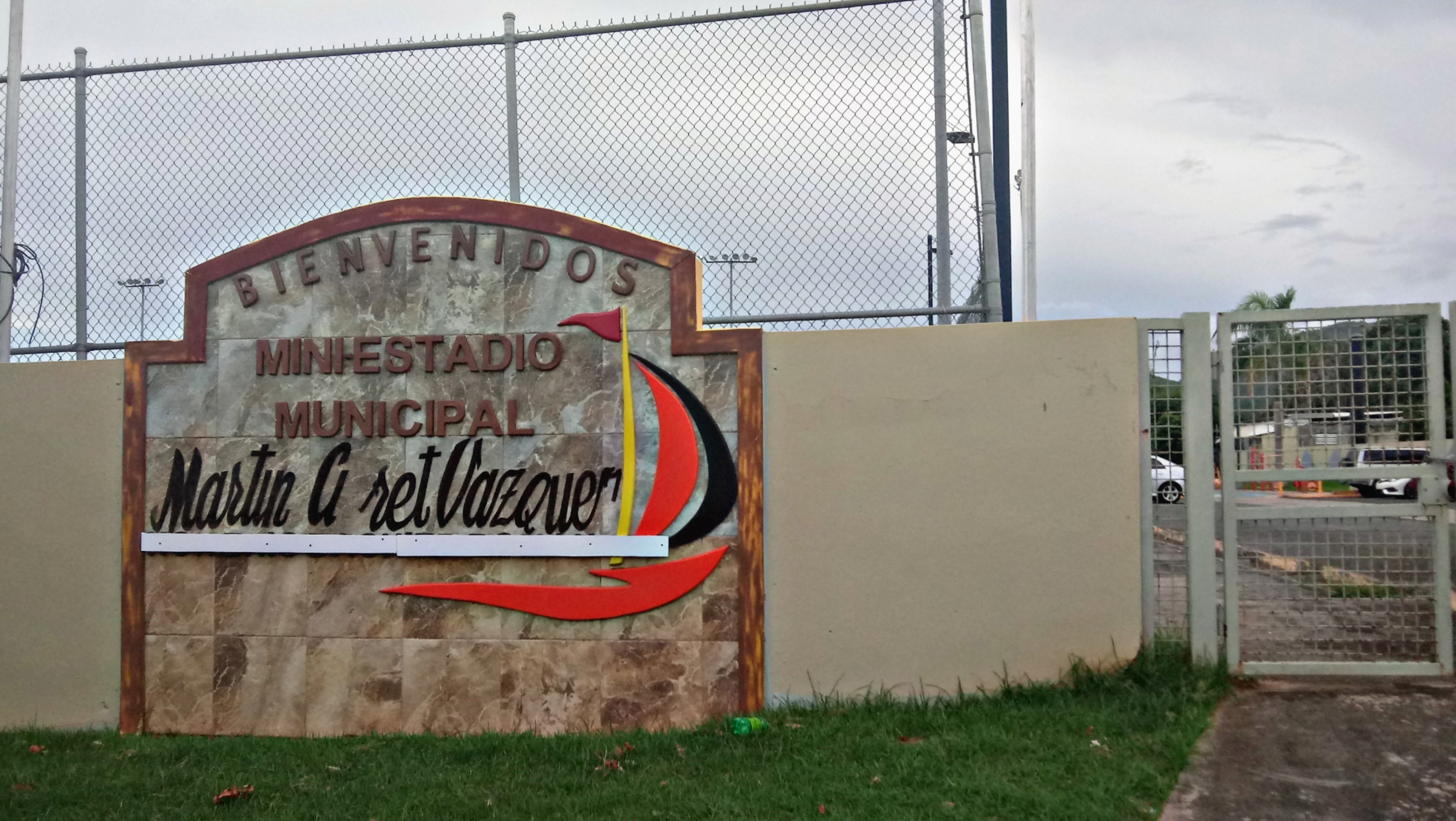
- Small stadium in Pitahaya

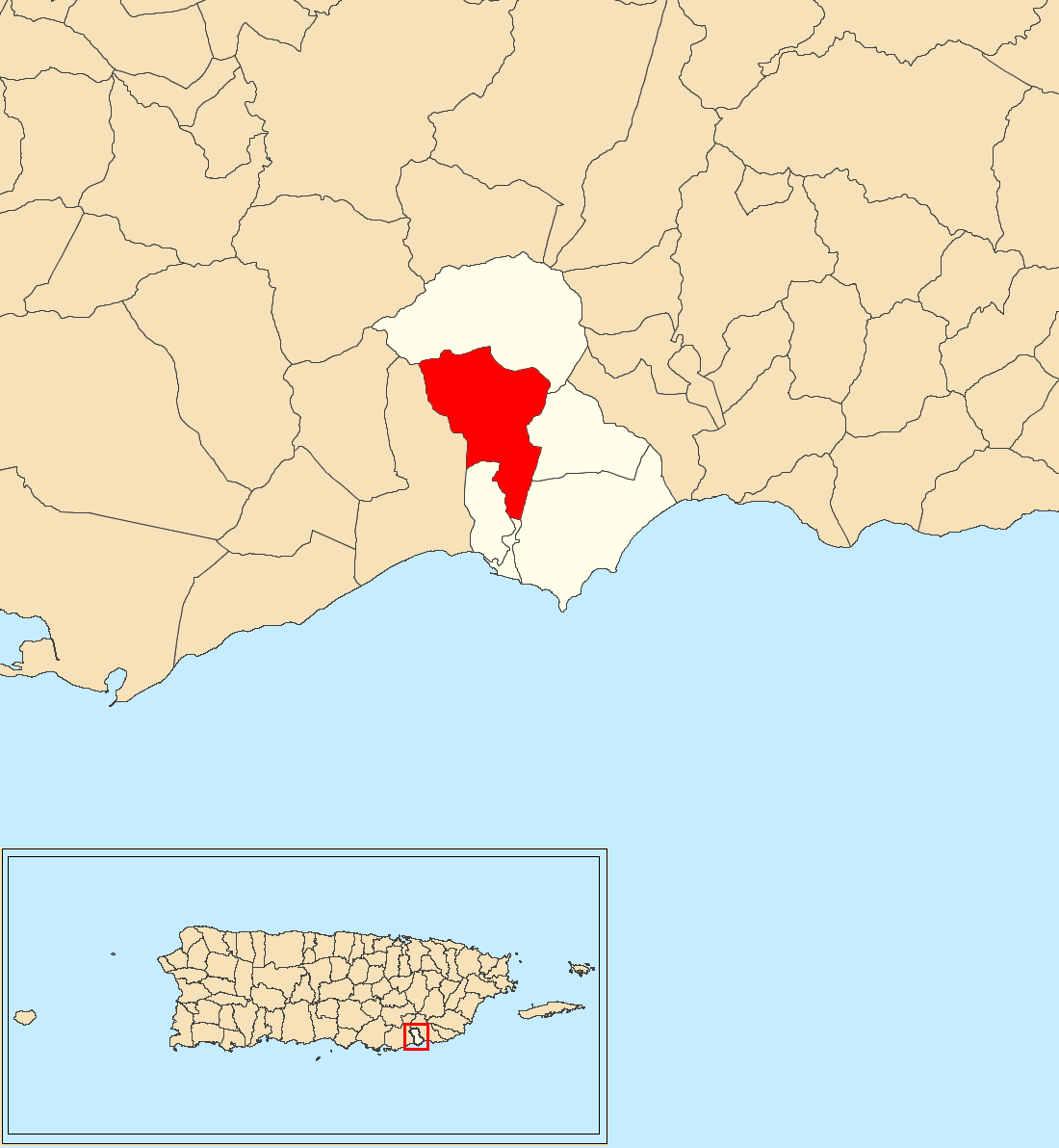
- Location of Pitahaya within the municipality of Arroyo shown in red

- Location of Puerto Rico
- Coordinates: 18°00′14″N 66°04′01″W
- Commonwealth: Puerto Rico
- Municipality: Arroyo

Area
  - Total: 3.19 sq mi (8.3 km^{2})
  - Land: 3.19 sq mi (8.3 km^{2})
  - Water: 0.00 sq mi (0 km^{2})
- Elevation: 328 ft (100 m)

Population (2010)
  - Total: 3,242
  - Density: 451.1/sq mi (174.2/km^{2})
- Source: 2010 Census
- Time zone: UTC−4 (AST)

Pitahaya is a barrio in the municipality of Arroyo, Puerto Rico. Its population in 2010 was 3,242.

== History ==
Pitahaya was in Spain's gazetteers until Puerto Rico was ceded by Spain in the aftermath of the Spanish–American War under the terms of the Treaty of Paris of 1898 and became an unincorporated territory of the United States. In 1899, the United States Department of War conducted a census of Puerto Rico finding that the population of Pitahaya barrio was 801.

Historical population
Census	Pop.	Note	%±
1910	1,044		—
1920	1,061		1.6%
1930	1,599		50.7%
1940	2,158		35.0%
1950	2,815		30.4%
1960	2,343		−16.8%
1970	0		−100.0%
1980	1,934		—
1990	3,414		76.5%
2000	3,981		16.6%
2010	3,242		−18.6%
U.S. Decennial Census; 1899 (shown as 1900) 1910-1930; 1930-1950 1980-2000 2010

== See also ==
- List of communities in Puerto Rico
