= Ancones, Arroyo, Puerto Rico =

Barrio of Puerto Rico

Ancones
- Barrio
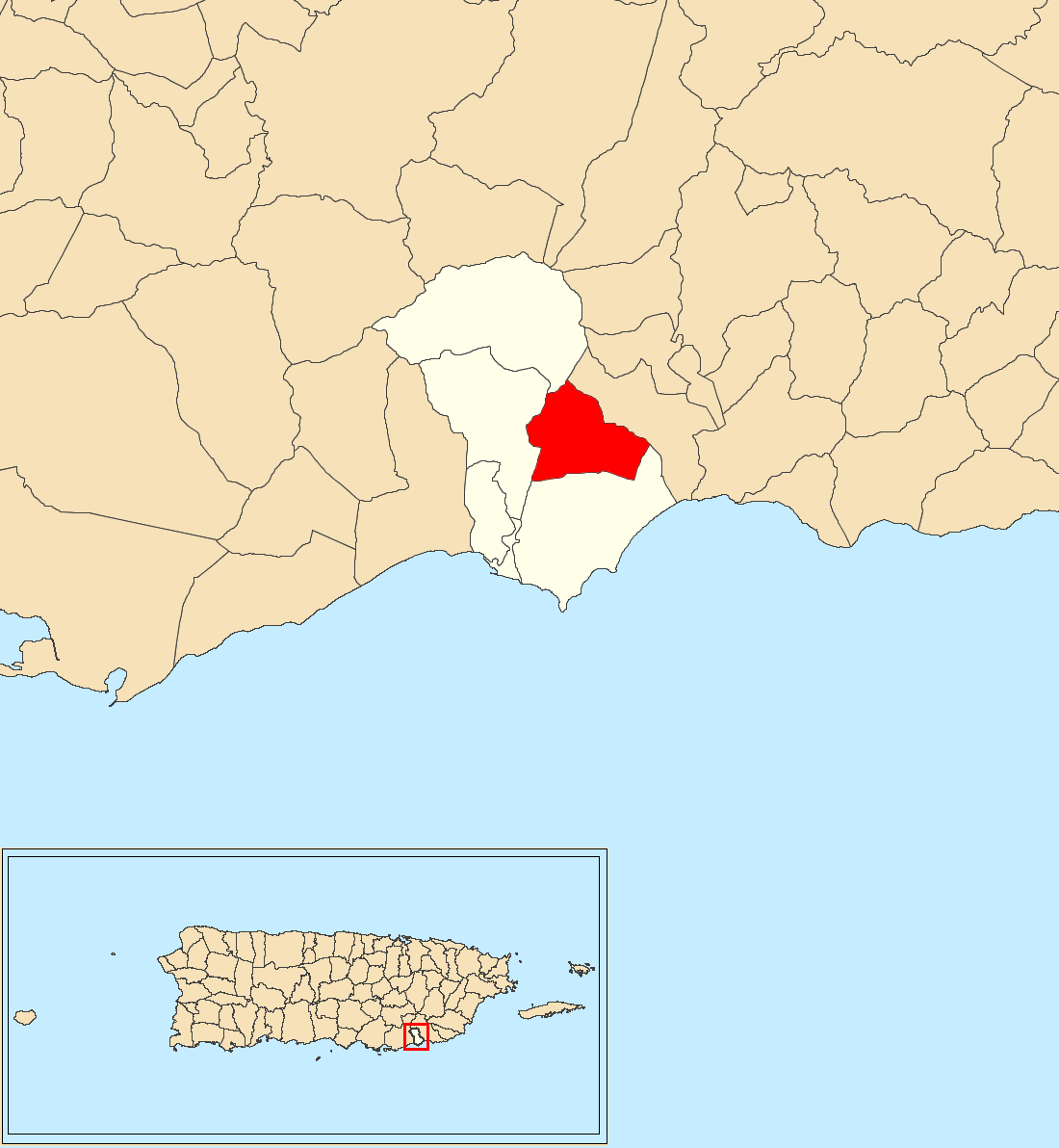
- Location of Ancones within the municipality of Arroyo shown in red

- Location of Puerto Rico
- Coordinates: 17°59′40″N 66°02′39″W
- Commonwealth: Puerto Rico
- Municipality: Arroyo

Area
  - Total: 2.05 sq mi (5.3 km^{2})
  - Land: 2.04 sq mi (5.3 km^{2})
  - Water: 0.01 sq mi (0.026 km^{2})
- Elevation: 161 ft (49 m)

Population (2010)
  - Total: 5,719
  - Density: 2,803.4/sq mi (1,082.4/km^{2})
- Source: 2010 Census
- Time zone: UTC−4 (AST)

Ancones is a barrio in the municipality of Arroyo, Puerto Rico. Its population in 2010 was 5,719.

== History ==
Ancones was in Spain's gazetteers until Puerto Rico was ceded by Spain in the aftermath of the Spanish–American War under the terms of the Treaty of Paris of 1898 and became an unincorporated territory of the United States. In 1899, the United States Department of War conducted a census of Puerto Rico finding that the combined population of Ancones, Palmas and Guásimas barrios was 596.

Historical population
| Census | Pop. | Note | %± |
|---|---|---|---|
| 1910 | 242 | | — |
| 1920 | 307 | | 26.9% |
| 1930 | 365 | | 18.9% |
| 1940 | 612 | | 67.7% |
| 1950 | 1,354 | | 121.2% |
| 1960 | 2,228 | | 64.5% |
| 1970 | 2,453 | | 10.1% |
| 1980 | 3,515 | | 43.3% |
| 1990 | 3,839 | | 9.2% |
| 2000 | 3,870 | | 0.8% |
| 2010 | 5,719 | | 47.8% |
U.S. Decennial Census; 1900 (N/A) 1910-1930; 1930-1950 1980-2000 2010

== See also ==
- List of communities in Puerto Rico
