= Arroyo, Puerto Rico =

Town and municipality in Puerto Rico

Arroyo Municipio Autónomo de Arroyo
- Town and Municipality
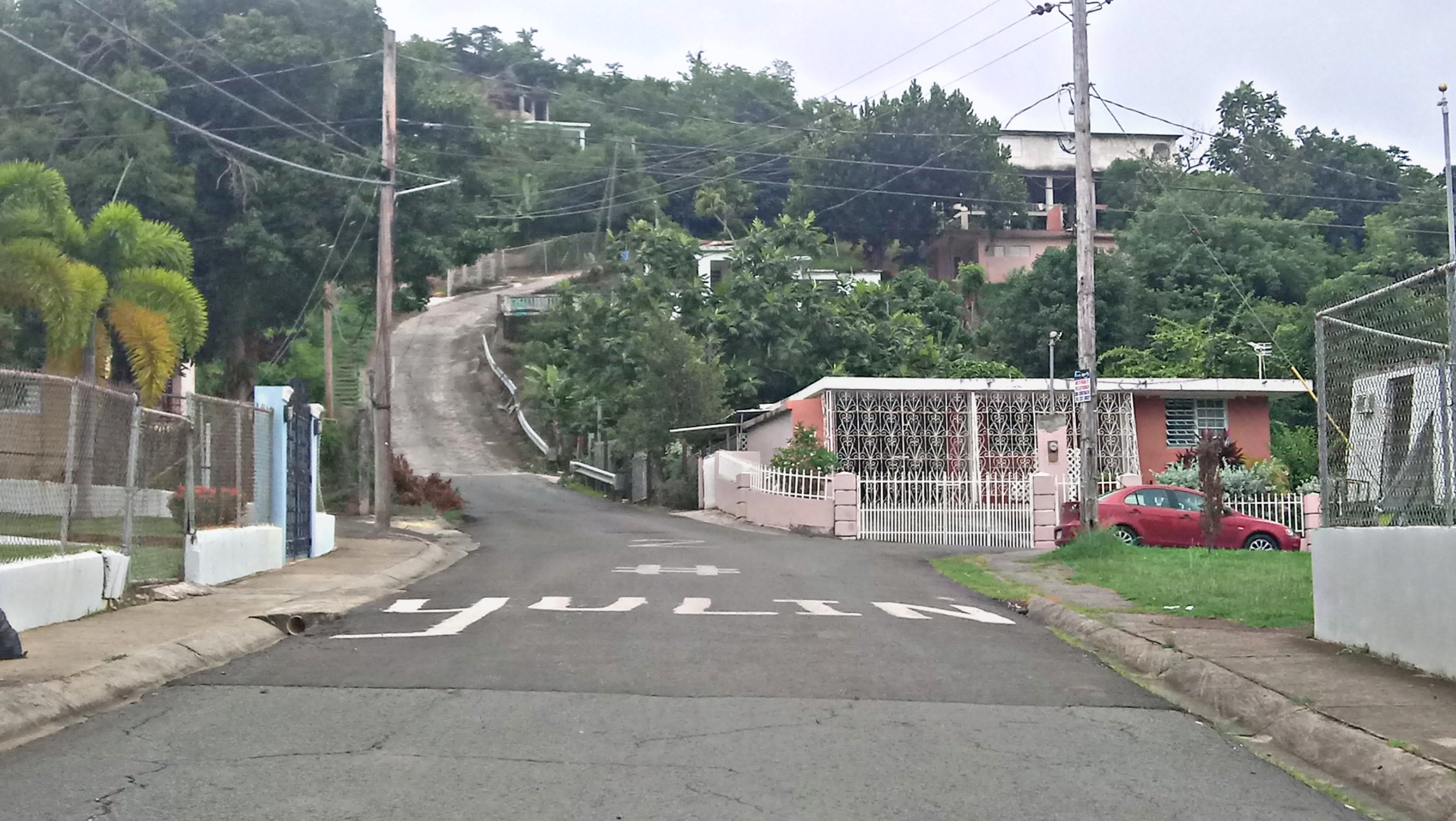
- Street in Barrio Palmas in Arroyo

- Flag Coat of arms
- Nicknames: "Pueblo Grato" "Los Bucaneros"
- Anthem: "Arroyo"
- Map of Puerto Rico highlighting Arroyo Municipality
- Coordinates: 17°57′57″N 66°03′41″W
- Sovereign state: United States
- Commonwealth: Puerto Rico
- Settled: early 19th century
- Founded: December 25, 1855
- Founder: Ignacio de Orbeta
- Barrios: 6 barrios: Ancones; Arroyo barrio-pueblo; Guásimas; Palmas; Pitahaya; Yaurel

Government
  - Mayor: Eric Bachier Román (PDP)
  - Senatorial dist.: 6 - Guayama
  - Representative dist.: 30

Area
  - Total: 23.0 sq mi (59.6 km^{2})
  - Land: 15 sq mi (39 km^{2})
  - Water: 8.0 sq mi (20.6 km^{2})

Population (2020)
  - Total: 15,843
  - Estimate (2025): 14,744 ▼
  - Rank: 67th in Puerto Rico
  - Density: 1,100/sq mi (410/km^{2})
- Demonym: Arroyanos
- Time zone: UTC−4 (AST)
- ZIP Code: 00714
- Area code: 787/939
- Website: www.arroyopr.gov

Arroyo (Spanish pronunciation: [aˈroʝo]) is a town and municipality located along the southern coast of Puerto Rico and bordered by the Caribbean Sea, east of the municipality of Guayama and northwest of the municipality of Patillas. Arroyo is spread over 5 barrios and Arroyo barrio-pueblo (the downtown area and administrative center). It is part of the Guayama Metropolitan Statistical Area.

== Etymology and nicknames ==
It is believed that the name of Arroyo (which means "creek" or "brook" in English) is derived from a small water stream where travelers stopped to freshen up before continuing on their way.

According to legend, one the town's first nicknames, Pueblo Ingrato ("Ungrateful Town"), comes from the locals in the 19th century who either burned or drowned a resident who contracted either cholera or the bubonic plague, even though he was renowned for his generosity. In the last century, however, there has been a push to change the nickname to Pueblo Grato ("Grateful Town") in order to clean the town's modern, laid back and friendly reputation.

Residents of Arroyo are often referred to as Bucaneros ("Buccaneers"), a reference to the region's historic pirate and buccaneer activities. The main sports teams of the municipality, most notably its volleyball team, are also called Los Bucaneros.

== History ==
The town of Arroyo was officially founded on December 25, 1855. However, some historians believe there were previous settlements in the area even previous to the Spanish colonization. There are four different versions about the founding of the town, including that it was formed when a small group of people from the neighbor town of Guayama came to the region looking for a port to export and import merchandise. Still, in 1868, a local newspaper called La Gaceta de Puerto Rico stated that Arroyo was founded in 1852. Between 1859 and 1860, City Hall signed agreements to open streets and build a town square and a sewer system for the town.

In 1858, Samuel Morse introduced wired communication to Latin America when he established a telegraph system in Puerto Rico, then a Spanish Colony. Morse's oldest daughter Susan Walker Morse (1821–1885), would often visit her uncle Charles Pickering Walker who owned the Hacienda Concordia in the town of Guayama. During one of her visits she met and later married Edward Lind, a Danish merchant who worked in the Hacienda La Henriqueta in Arroyo. Lind purchased the Hacienda from his sister when she became a widow. Morse, who often spent his winters at the Hacienda with his daughter and son-in-law, set a two-mile telegraph line connecting his son-in-law's Hacienda to their house in Arroyo. The line was inaugurated on March 1, 1859, in a ceremony flanked by the Spanish and American flags. The first lines transmitted by Samuel Morse that day in Puerto Rico were:

"Puerto Rico, beautiful jewel! When you are linked with the other jewels of the Antilles in the necklace of the world's telegraph, yours will not shine less brilliantly in the crown of your Queen!"

Puerto Rico was ceded by Spain in the aftermath of the Spanish–American War under the terms of the Treaty of Paris of 1898 and became a territory of the United States. In 1899, the United States Department of War conducted a census of Puerto Rico finding that the population of Arroyo was 4,867.

In 1902, Puerto Rico's Legislative Assembly approved a law to consolidate certain municipalities. According to it, Arroyo would be merged with Guayama starting on July 1 of that year. However, the law was revoked in 1905 returning Arroyo to its municipal status.

In early 1999, the U.S. Congressional record documented a commendation of Arroyo, on its 100-year relationship with the U.S., noting that many citizens of Arroyo, such as Virgilio Sánchez and Raul Serrano, have fought and died in wars for the U.S.

On September 20, 2017, Hurricane Maria's wind and rainfall triggered numerous landslides in Arroyo. The hurricane destroyed 1,550 structures in Arroyo. A bridge on PR-725 collapsed leaving 130 families trapped.

== Geography ==
Arroyo is part of the alluvial plains sub-region of Ponce-Patillas known as the Southern Coastal Valley. The area is very dry although its plains are productive thanks to artificial irrigation. At 2,460.4 feet (750 m) the highest point in the municipality of Arroyo is Cerro Tumbado, located on the municipal boundary with Guayama in the Sierra de Cayey range.

=== Barrios ===
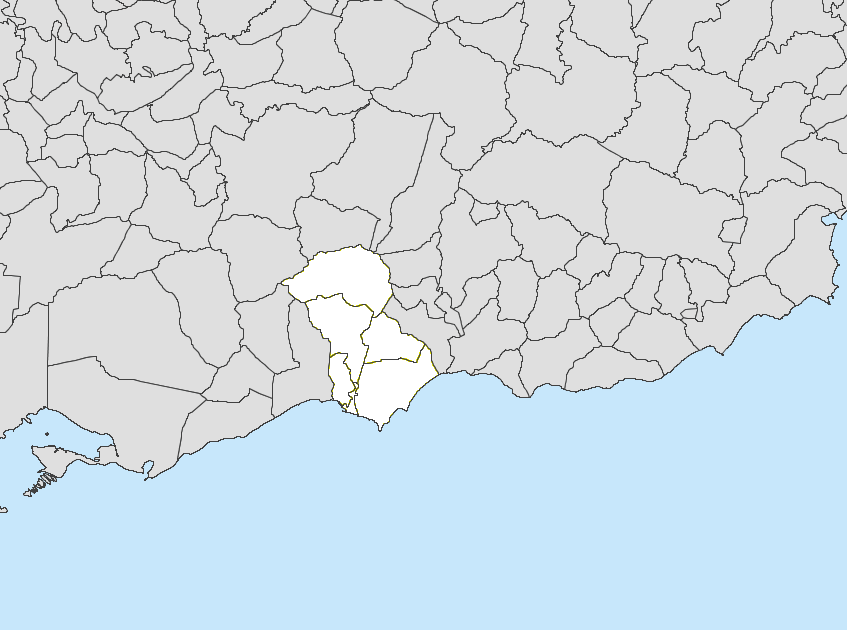
Subdivisions of Arroyo.

Like all municipalities of Puerto Rico, Arroyo is subdivided into barrios. The municipal buildings, central square and large Catholic church are located in a small barrio referred to as "el pueblo", near the center of the municipality.

1. Ancones
2. Arroyo barrio-pueblo
3. Guásimas
4. Palmas
5. Pitahaya
6. Yaurel

=== Sectors ===
Barrios (which are, in contemporary times, roughly comparable to minor civil divisions) and subbarrios, are further subdivided into smaller areas called sectores (sectors in English). The types of sectores may vary, from normally sector to urbanización to reparto to barriada to residencial, among others.

=== Special Communities ===
Comunidades Especiales de Puerto Rico (Special Communities of Puerto Rico) are marginalized communities whose citizens are experiencing a certain amount of social exclusion. A map shows these communities occur in nearly every municipality of the commonwealth. Of the 742 places that were on the list in 2014, the following barrios, communities, sectors, or neighborhoods were in Arroyo: the Marín neighborhood, Palmas barrio, Yaurel barrio, and the San Felipe-Arizona zone.

=== Water features ===
The Nigua River crosses the municipality from north to south. Its hydrographic system is completed by a series of smaller rivers. There is also a mineral water spring in Virella Colony.

== Demographics ==
Historical population
Census	Pop.	Note	%±
1900	4,867		—
1910	6,940		42.6%
1920	7,074		1.9%
1930	8,199		15.9%
1940	10,746		31.1%
1950	12,936		20.4%
1960	13,315		2.9%
1970	13,033		−2.1%
1980	17,014		30.5%
1990	18,910		11.1%
2000	19,117		1.1%
2010	19,575		2.4%
2020	15,843		−19.1%
2025 (est.)	14,744	▼	−6.9%
U.S. Decennial Census; 1899 (shown as 1900) 1910-1930; 1930-1950 1960-2000 2010 2020

== Tourism ==
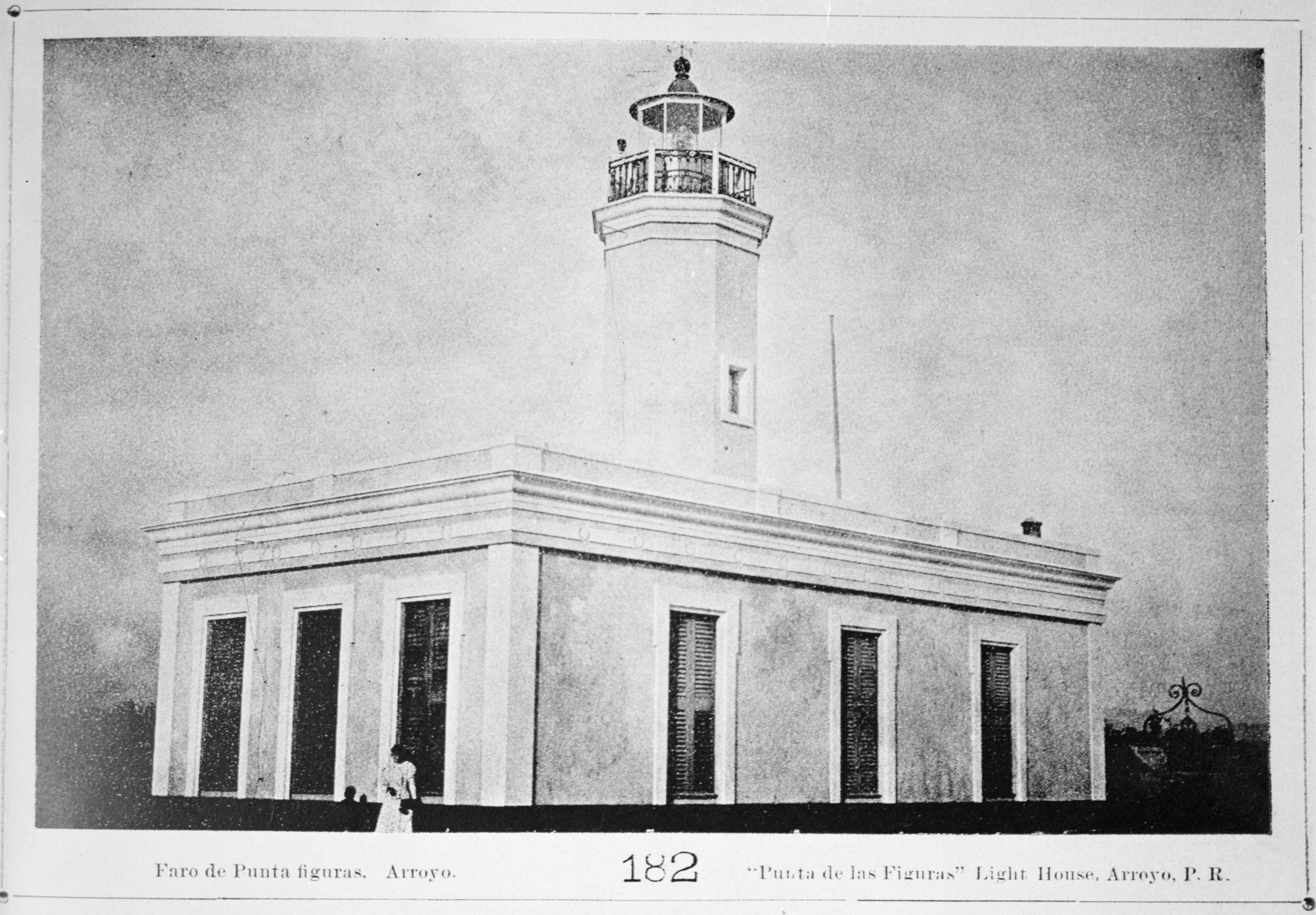
Faro Punta de las Figuras, Arroyo

=== Landmarks and places of interest ===
There are eight beaches in Arroyo.

Among the places of interest in Arroyo are the Enrique Huyke Monument, dedicated to the educator and athlete, and the Samuel Morse Monument, dedicated to the American inventor of the telegraph. Casa de Aduana is a museum located in Arroyo.

Other landmarks are Hacienda La Cora, Las Palmas Beach, Punta Guilarte, Punta de Las Figuras Lighthouse and the Arroyo Sugar Cane Train.

To stimulate local tourism during the COVID-19 pandemic in Puerto Rico, the Puerto Rico Tourism Company launched the Voy Turistiendo (I'm Touring) campaign in 2021. The campaign featured a passport book with a page for each municipality. The Voy Turisteando Arroyo passport page lists Malecón Paseo Las Américas, Centro Vacacional Punta Guilarte, Faro Punta Figuras, and the Arroyo Surfing Park, as places of interest.

== Culture ==
=== Festivals and events ===
Arroyo celebrates its patron saint festival in July. The Fiestas Patronales de Nuestra Sra. del Carmen is a religious and cultural celebration in honor of Our Lady of Mount Carmel that generally features parades, games, artisans, amusement rides, regional food, and live entertainment.

A traditional carnaval is held in the month of February. Fiesta Negra, which celebrates the African heritage of the island, is held in March. The Festival del Pescao is celebrated in November.

=== Sports ===
Although Arroyo doesn't have a professional sports team, it has several amateur teams in Class A category.

=== Cultural/art venues ===
The Museo Antigua Aduana is a historic building that now showcases art by local artists, such as Angel Cora. In 2011, the Cine Renacimiento (Renaissance Cinema), which was founded in 1922, re-opened after a little over a year of construction to transform into a theater space compatible with new uses and now known as Teatro Renacimiento (Renaissance Theater). It is located at Morse St. (PR-178) and Arizona 7 St.

== Economy ==
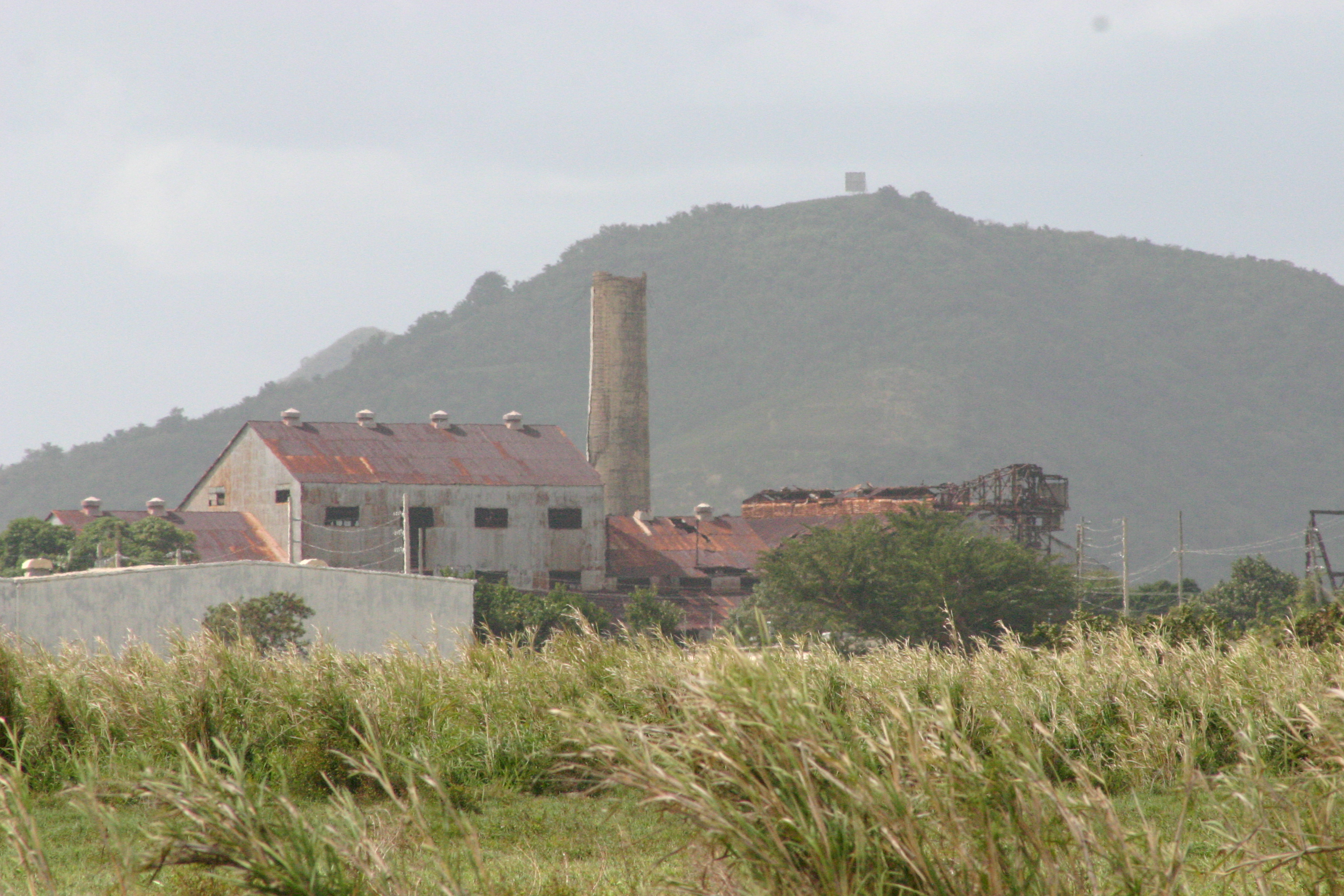
Old sugar mill in Arroyo

During past centuries, Arroyo was known for the production of sugar in the Central Lafayette, a sugar mill.

In recent years, manufacture and pharmaceutical industries have taken control of the economy of Arroyo. Stryker Corporation, a developer of medical implants and other surgical equipment, has a production plant in the town.

== Government ==
All municipalities in Puerto Rico are administered by a mayor, elected every four years. The current mayor is Eric Bachier Román. He was first elected at the 2012 general elections.

The city belongs to the Puerto Rico Senatorial district VI, which is represented by two Senators. In 2024, Rafael Santos Ortiz and Wilmer Reyes Berríos were elected as District Senators.

== Symbols ==
The municipio has an official flag and coat of arms. Arroyo's flag has two horizontal bands of equal size. The upper band is color orange, while the lower one is black. In the middle of the flag lies Arroyo's coat of arms.

The coat of arms is also split in two sections. The upper section features a church in a blue field a church with a rosary to the right and a flower to the left. The lower section features two silver telegraph poles on green hills. At the bottom, waving stripes of blue and silver, with a fish below them. Above the shield, lies a crown of three towers filled in with purple. Below there's a banner with the motto, Arroyo Pueblo Grato.

== Education ==
Education is handled by the Puerto Rico Department of Education. Arroyo has seven elementary schools, three junior high schools, and one high school.

== Transportation ==
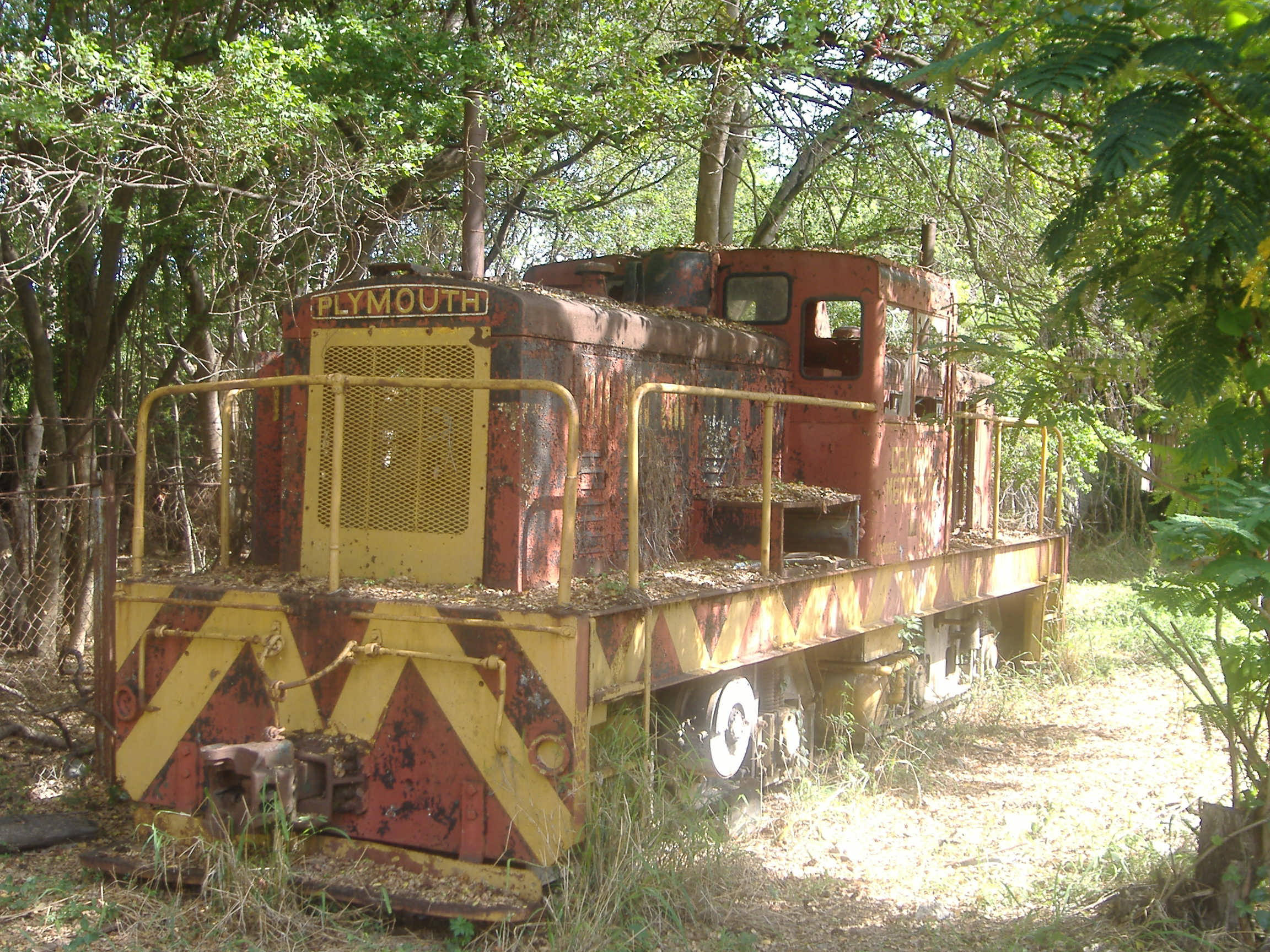
Tren del Sur

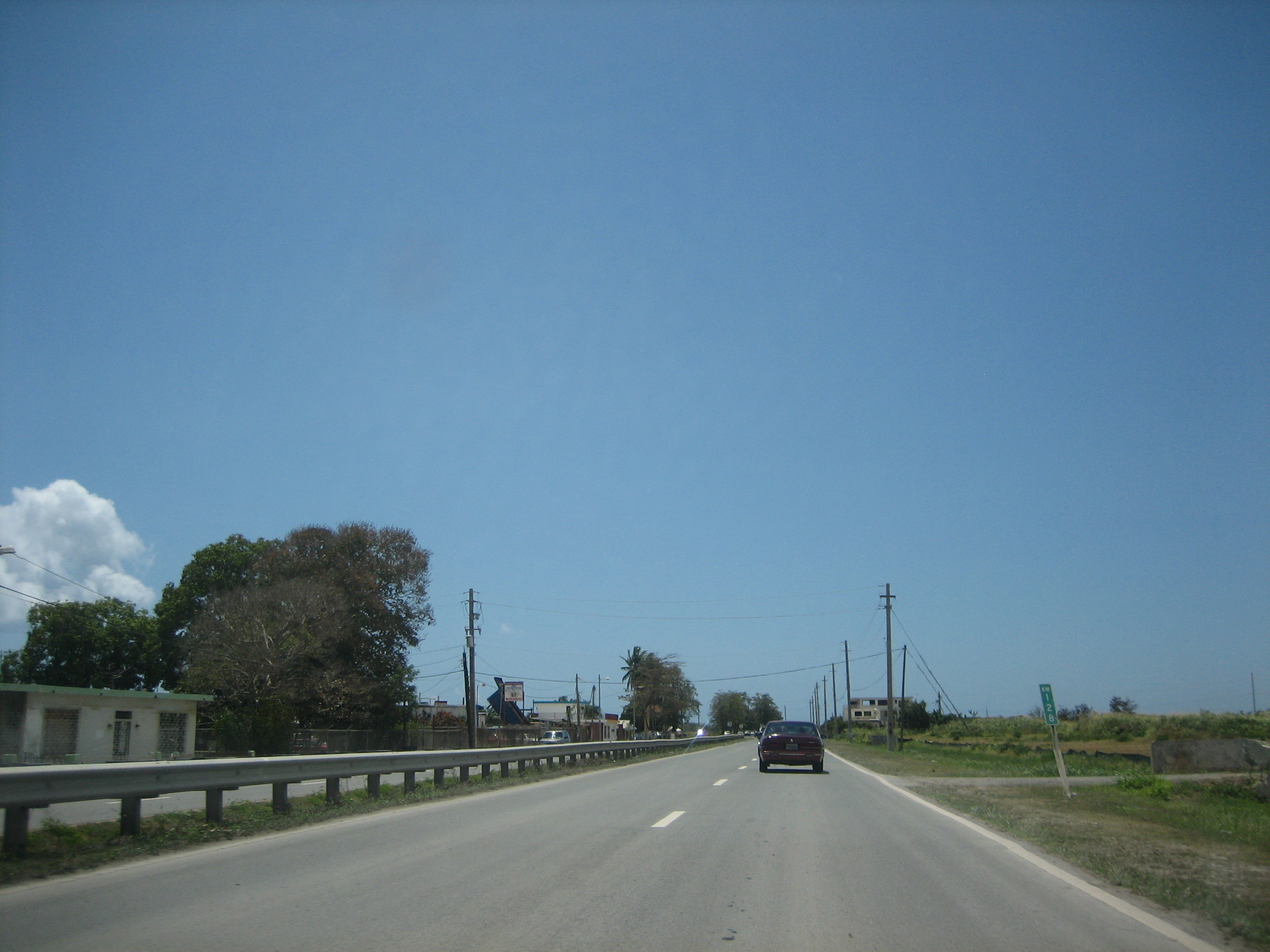
Puerto Rico Highway 3 in Arroyo

During the peak of the sugarcane industry in the island, Arroyo was part of the railroad system of the island, with trains hauling production to other municipalities in the island. A small portion of that train remained in use until recently for tourism purposes, under the name of Tren del Sur.

To reach Arroyo, visitors have to take the Puerto Rico Highway 3. However, there are other rural roads available to reach the municipality.

There are 13 bridges in Arroyo.

== Notable people ==
- Carmen Bozello y Guzmán, one of three known female Puerto Rican nineteenth-century playwrights who wrote a comedy entitled Abnegación y Sacrificio: Comedia en 2 Actos y en Prosa (which premiered on October 15, 1876, in Puerto Rico and was printed by Cayetano Sánchez y Vegas in 1876).
- Juan Bernardo Huyke, former interim Governor of Puerto Rico.
- Alberto A. Nido, former United States Air Force officer.
- José Cruz, baseball player, former player for the Houston Astros.
- Jake Rodríguez, former IBF light welterweight champion.
- Génesis Dávila, beauty pageant, former Miss Mundo Puerto Rico and Miss Florida USA.
- Rafael Román Meléndez, former Secretary of Education of Puerto Rico.
- Celiangely Morales, sprinter, competed at the 2016 Summer Olympics.
- Héctor Soto, known as Picky Soto, professional volleyball player, captain and former member of the Puerto Rico men's national volleyball team.
- Monica Gonzalez Rivera, female boxer

== Gallery ==
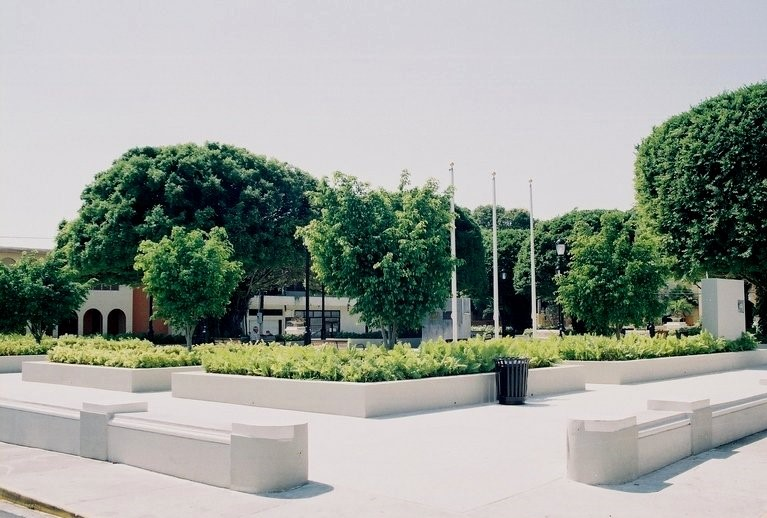
Central plaza in Arroyo barrio-pueblo

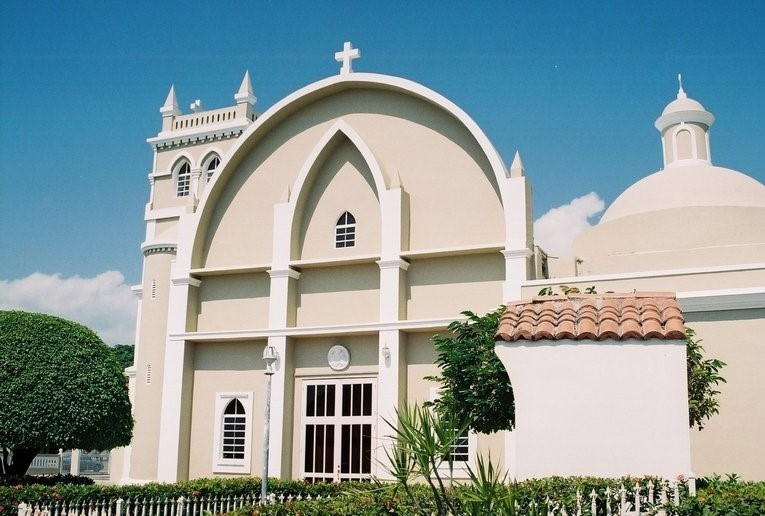
Our Lady of Carmen Parish church

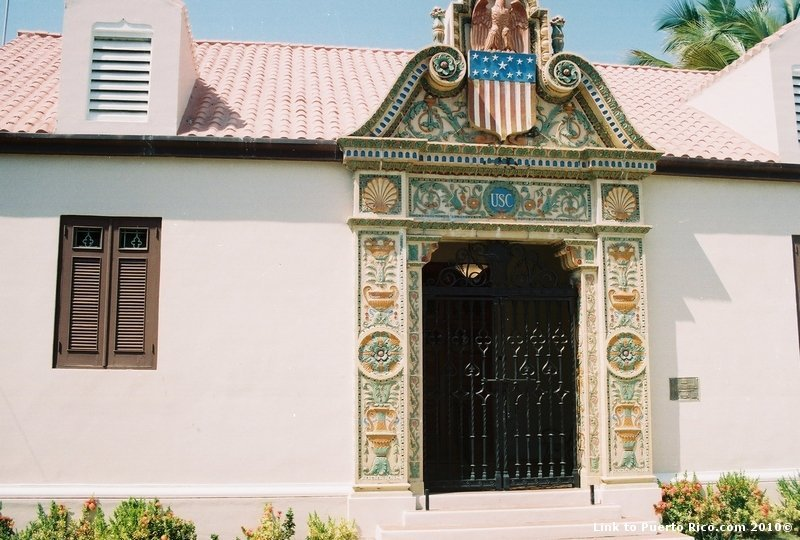
Casa Aduana in Arroyo

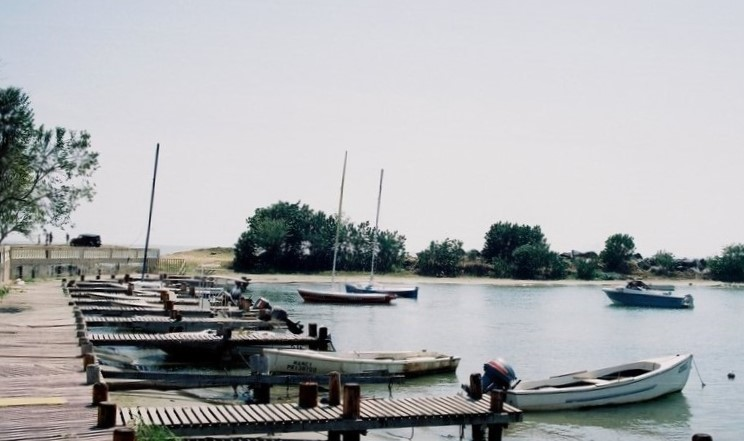
Pier in Arroyo

== See also ==
- List of Puerto Ricans
- History of Puerto Rico
