= List of churches in the Diocese of Ponce =

This is a list of current and former Roman Catholic churches in the Diocese of Ponce, one of the suffragan dioceses of the Archdiocese of San Juan de Puerto Rico. The jurisdiction of this diocese comprises the Puerto Rican municipalities of Adjuntas, Arroyo, Coamo, Guánica, Guayama, Guayanilla, Jayuya, Juana Díaz, Patillas, Peñuelas, Ponce, Salinas, Santa Isabel, Villalba and Yauco.

The mother church of the diocese is the Cathedral of Our Lady of Guadalupe in Ponce.

== Municipality of Adjuntas ==
Church name	Image	Location	Date est.	Description/notes
Nuestra Señora de Fátima		Juan González		
Nuestra Señora del Carmen		Yahuecas		
San Francisco de Asís		Garzas		
San Joaquín y Santa Ana		Adjuntas Pueblo	1815	Main town parish of Adjuntas, located in the Plaza Poeta Arístides Moll Boscana. The current church building dates to 1968.
Santa Ana		Vegas Arriba		
Santa Rosa de Lima		Pellejas		
Santa Teresita del Niño Jesús		Tres de Jayuya		
San Antonio de Padua		Guilarte		
Sagrado Corazón de Jesús		Tanamá		

== Municipality of Arroyo ==
Church name	Image	Location	Date est.	Description/notes
Nuestra Señora de Fátima		Palmas		
Nuestra Señora de la Milagrosa		Ancones		
Nuestra Señora del Carmen		Arroyo Pueblo	1855	Main town parish of Arroyo, located across from the Plaza Samuel F. B. Morse. Served by the Dominican Sisters of Fátima.
Nuestra Señora del Carmen		Pitahaya		
San Francisco de Asís		Yaurel		
San José		Yaurel		
San Martín de Porres		Yaurel		

== Municipality of Coamo ==
Church name	Image	Location	Date est.	Description/notes
Inmaculado Corazón de María		Palmarejo		
Nuestra Señora de Lourdes		San Ildefonso		
Nuestra Señora de Valvanera		Coamo Pueblo	1685	Historic brick masonry chapel, today it forms part of the Colegio Nuestra Señora de Valvanera high school campus.
Nuestra Señora del Carmen		Hayales		
San Antonio de Padua		Los Llanos		
San Blas de Illescas		Coamo Pueblo	1579	Main town parish of Coamo, located in the Plaza Luis Muñoz Rivera. One of the oldest parishes in the island, the current structure was finished in 1661, with additional Baroque ornamentation added in 1784.
San Martín de Porres		San Ildefonso		

== Municipality of Guánica ==
Church name	Image	Location	Date est.	Description/notes
Cristo Rey		Susúa Baja		
Nuestra Señora de Fátima		Susúa Baja	1953	Marian shrine dedicated to Our Lady of Fátima, former sugarcane plantation and manor house, today part of the Convent of the Dominican Sisters of Our Lady of the Rosary of Fátima, owned by the congregation since 1962.
Nuestra Señora de la Monserrate		Ciénaga		Community church of Fuig.
Nuestra Señora del Perpetuo Socorro		Susúa Baja		
Nuestra Señora del Rosario		Montalva		Community church of Guaypao.
Sagrado Corazón de Jesús		Ensenada	1963	Community chapel established in the early 20th century to serve the Catholic communities in the poblado of Ensenada and Central Guánica. The church was elevated to parish in 1963.
San Antonio Abad		Guánica Pueblo	1888	Main town parish of Guánica, located in the Plaza Manuel Jiménez. The first church building was destroyed by the 1928 San Felipe hurricane and rebuilt to its current one in 1953.
San Judas Tadeo		Carenero		Community church of La Luna.

== Municipality of Guayama ==
Church name	Image	Location	Date est.	Description/notes
Cristo Rey		Caimital		Community church of Olimpo.
Nuestra Señora de Fátima		Pozo Hondo		Community church of Cimarrona.
Nuestra Señora de la Candelaria		Algarrobo		
Nuestra Señora del Carmen		Carmen		Community church of the pueblito del Carmen.
Sagrado Corazón de Jesús		Guamaní		
San Antonio de Padua		Guayama Pueblo	1736	Main town parish of Guayama, located in the Plaza Cristóbal Colón. The current church building dates to 1775, and its towers and façade to 1874.
San José Obrero		Algarrobo		Community church of Branderí.
San Martín de Porres		Carite		
Santos Apóstoles Pedro y Pablo		Jobos		

== Municipality of Guayanilla ==
Church name	Image	Location	Date est.	Description/notes
Inmaculada Concepción de María		Guayanilla Pueblo	1840	Main town parish of Guayanilla, located in the Plaza Luis Muñoz Marín. The church was destroyed by the 2020 earthquake and is still under reconstruction.
Nuestra Señora de Fátima		Macaná		
Nuestra Señora de la Monserrate		Consejo		
Nuestra Señora del Carmen		Sierra Baja		
Nuestra Señora del Perpetuo Socorro		Magas		
San Martín de Porres		Macaná		

== Municipality of Jayuya ==
Church name	Image	Location	Date est.	Description/notes
Nuestra Señora de la Monserrate		Jayuya Pueblo	1883	Main town parish of Jayuya, located in the Plaza Nemesio Rosario Canales Rivera. The first 19th-century structure was destroyed by the 1899 San Ciriaco hurricane, and the current church building, designed by Francisco Porrata Doria, dates to the 1930s.
Nuestra Señora de la Providencia		Jayuya Abajo		
San Antonio de Padua		Mameyes Arriba		
San Patricio		Pica		
Cristo Rey		Collores		

== Municipality of Juana Díaz ==
Church name	Image	Location	Date est.	Description/notes
Divina Misericordia		Amuelas		Community church of Piedra Aguzá.
Nuestra Señora de Fátima		Jacaguas		
Nuestra Señora de la Merced		Río Cañas Arriba		
Nuestra Señora de Lourdes		Sabana Llana		
Nuestra Señora del Rosario		Guayabal		
San Judas Tadeo		Río Cañas Abajo		
San Martín de Porres		Capitanejo		Community church of Potala Pastillo.
San Ramón Nonato		Juana Díaz	1798	Main town parish of Juana Díaz, located in the Plaza Román Baldorioty de Castro. The current Baroque-style church building dates to 1807.
Santa Teresita del Niño Jesús		Capitanejo		Community church of Arús.
Schoenstatt		Sabana Llana	1988	Schoenstatt shrine of the Schoenstatt Apostolic Movement.

== Municipality of Patillas ==
Church name	Image	Location	Date est.	Description/notes
Cristo Rey		Bajo		Community church of Lamboglia.
Inmaculado Corazón de María		Patillas Pueblo	1811	Main town parish of Patillas, located in the Plaza Adelina Cintrón. The first permanent stone church was built in 1848 and destroyed in 1928 by the San Felipe Segundo hurricane. The current church, designed by Francisco Porrata Doria, dates to the 1930s.
Nuestra Señora de La Candelaria		Guardarraya		
Nuestra Señora del Perpetuo Socorro		Marín		
San Juan Evangelista		Mulas		
Santa Rosa de Lima		Pollos		

== Municipality of Peñuelas ==
Church name	Image	Location	Date est.	Description/notes
Divino Niño		Tallaboa Alta		
Inmaculado Corazón de María		Tallaboa Poniente		
La Milagrosa		Rucio		
Sagrado Corazón		Encarnación		
San José		Peñuelas Pueblo	1793	Main town parish of Peñuelas, located in the main town square. The current church building was designed by Francisco Porrata Doria and built in 1929, after the original church was heavily damaged by the 1918 earthquake and the 1928 San Felipe Segundo hurricane.
Santa Ana		Tallaboa Alta		
Santa Cruz		Barreal		

== Municipality of Ponce ==
Church name	Image	Location	Date est.	Description/notes
Buen Pastor		Canas	1968	
Corazón de Jesús		Sabanetas	1969	
Corazón de María		Bucaná		
Cristo Rey		Machuelo Abajo	1964	
La Milagrosa		Sexto	1928	Served by the Paulist Fathers.
Nuestra Señora de Fátima		Marueño		
Nuestra Señora de Guadalupe		Segundo	1670	Cathedral and main town church of Ponce, located in the Plaza Las Delicias. Elevated to parish church in 1692 and then to cathedral in 1924. The cathedral is a regional center for the devotion of Our Lady of Guadalupe since 1757 (the oldest outside of Mexico), and Las Mañanitas, an annual celebration dedicated to her, takes place each December there.
Nuestra Señora de la Merced		Cuarto	1928	Elevated to parish in 1929. Served by the Mercedarian Order. Church building designed by Francisco Luis Porrata Doria.
Nuestra Señora del Carmen		Playa	1876	Parish established in 1886, the second oldest in Ponce. Served by the Piarist Fathers.
Nuestra Señora del Carmen		Primero	1883	Historic chapel, originally part of the former Santo Asilo de Damas hospital, today located in the Parque Urbano Dora Colón Clavell.
Nuestra Señora del Carmen		Coto Laurel	1973	
Resurrección		Machuelo Arriba	1967	Served by the Piarist Fathers.
San Conrado		Primero	1948	Served by the Capuchin Friars. It hosts the Colegio San Conrado parochial school.
San José Obrero		Canas	1979	Community church of El Tuque.
Nuestra Señora del Carmen		Carmelita		
San Judas Tadeo		San Antón	1963	Pilgrimage site part of the Santuario Insular San Judas Tadeo, founded by Bishop Jaime E. McManus. Served by the Order of the Blessed Virgin Mary of Mercy.
San Martín de Porres		Real		
Santa Ana		Guaraguao		
Santa María Reina		Canas Urbano	1952	The current Modernist church building, designed by Carl B. Brunner, was erected in 1957 on the grounds of the Pontifical Catholic University of Puerto Rico. Served by the Congregation of St. Paul the Apostle.
Santa Teresita		Segundo	1930	
Santisima Trinidad		Magueyes	1971	
Santísimo Sacramento		Playa	1986	

== Municipality of Salinas ==
Church name	Image	Location	Date est.	Description/notes
Espíritu Santo		Lapa		
Inmaculada Concepción		Río Jueyes		Community church of Las Ochenta.
La Milagrosa		Aguirre		Community church of Playa de Salinas.
Nuestra Señora de la Monserrate		Salinas Pueblo	1854	Main town parish of Salinas, located in the Plaza Las Delicias. A chapel existed at the site of the church since as early as 1690. The current church building was erected in 1913.
Nuestra Señora del Carmen		Palmas		
Sagrado Corazón de Jesús		Aguirre	1946	
San José Obrero		Quebrada Yeguas		
Santa Ana		Lapa		Community church of El Coco.
Virgen de la Milagrosa		Aguirre		Community church of the Aguirre poblado.

== Municipality of Santa Isabel ==
Church name	Image	Location	Date est.	Description/notes
Nuestra Señora de la Monserrate		Descalabrado		
Nuestra Señora del Perpetuo Socorro		Felicia 2		
San Ignacio de Loyola		Jauca 1		
Santiago Apóstol		Santa Isabel Pueblo	1842	Main town parish of Santa Isabel, located in the Plaza de los Fundadores. Designed by state architect Pedro Cobreros and built in stages between 1871 and 1899. The current church building dates to 1965.

== Municipality of Villalba ==
Church name	Image	Location	Date est.	Description/notes
Nuestra Señora del Carmen		Villalba Pueblo	1895	Main town parish of Villalba, located in the main town square. Former community church elevated to parish status in 1917, coinciding with the official foundation of the municipality. The current church building dates to the 1930s after the previous structure was destroyed by the 1928 San Felipe Segundo hurricane.
San Juan Evangelista		Villalba Arriba		
San Pablo		Villalba Arriba		
Santa Clara de Asís		Hato Puerco Abajo		Monastery of Santa Clara de Asís, a convent of the Poor Clares.
Santísimo Sacramento		Hato Puerco Abajo		

== Municipality of Yauco ==
Church name	Image	Location	Date est.	Description/notes
Nuestra Señora de la Monserrate		Susúa Baja		Community church of Río Loco.
Nuestra Señora del Rosario		Yauco Pueblo	1720	Ruins of the first hermitage of Yauco, which was abandoned in the 1750s when the town was relocated north, to its current location.
Nuestra Señora del Rosario		Yauco Pueblo	1755	Main town parish of Yauco, located in the Plaza Fernando de Pacheco y Matos. Elevated to parish status in 1756, coinciding with the foundation of Yauco. The current church building, designed by designed by Francisco Luis Porrata-Doria, dates to 1934.
San Antonio de Padua		Diego Hernández		
San José		Almácigo Bajo		
San Martín de Porres		Almácigo Bajo		
San Martín de Porres		Susúa Baja	1969	
Santa Lucía		Sierra Alta		
Santa Rosa de Lima		Susúa Alta		
Santiago Apóstol		Barina		
Santo Domingo de Guzmán		Susúa Baja	2001	
