= Héctor Luis Colón =

Puerto Rican politician

Mayor of Guayama
- In office January 14, 1985 – January 14, 2008
- Preceded by: Miguel Díaz Tirado
- Succeeded by: Glorimari Jaime

Member of the Municipal Assembly of Guayama, Puerto Rico
- In office 1980–1984

Personal details
- Born: Héctor Luis Colón Mendoza; August 5, 1937 Guayama, Puerto Rico
- Died: September 26, 2018 (aged 81) Guayama, Puerto Rico
- Resting place: Valle del Sur Memorial Park in Guayama, Puerto Rico
- Party: Popular Democratic Party (PPD)
- Spouse: Sonia Rivera
- Education: Pontifical Catholic University of Puerto Rico (BEd)

Military service
- Allegiance: United States of America
- Branch/service: United States Army; Army National Guard
- Rank: Sergeant

Héctor Luis Colón Mendoza (August 5, 1937 – September 26, 2018) was a Puerto Rican politician and a former mayor of Guayama. Colón was affiliated with the Popular Democratic Party (PPD).

== Biography ==
Héctor Luis Colón born in Guayama and raised in Puente Jobos community. His parents Flor Colón and Ramona Mendoza were community and political leaders in Puente Jobos. Héctor Luis Colón served in the United States Army and in the Puerto Rico National Guard until he was honorably discharged with the rank of Sergeant.

Héctor Luis Colón earned bachelor's degree in education with a specialty in mathematics from the Pontifical Catholic University of Puerto Rico.

Started in politics when he ran for member of the Guayama Municipal Assembly in 1980. He ran successfully for Mayor of Guayama in the 1984 elections. He served as Mayor of Guayama for 28 years until 2008.

Héctor Luis Colón died on September 26, 2018, in Guayama, Puerto Rico, after suffering a heart attack. He was 81 years old. He was buried at Valle del Sur Memorial Park in Guayama, Puerto Rico.
