= Ingenio Azucarero Vives =

Historic place in Guayama, Puerto Rico

- U.S. National Register of Historic Places
- Puerto Rico Historic Sites and Zones
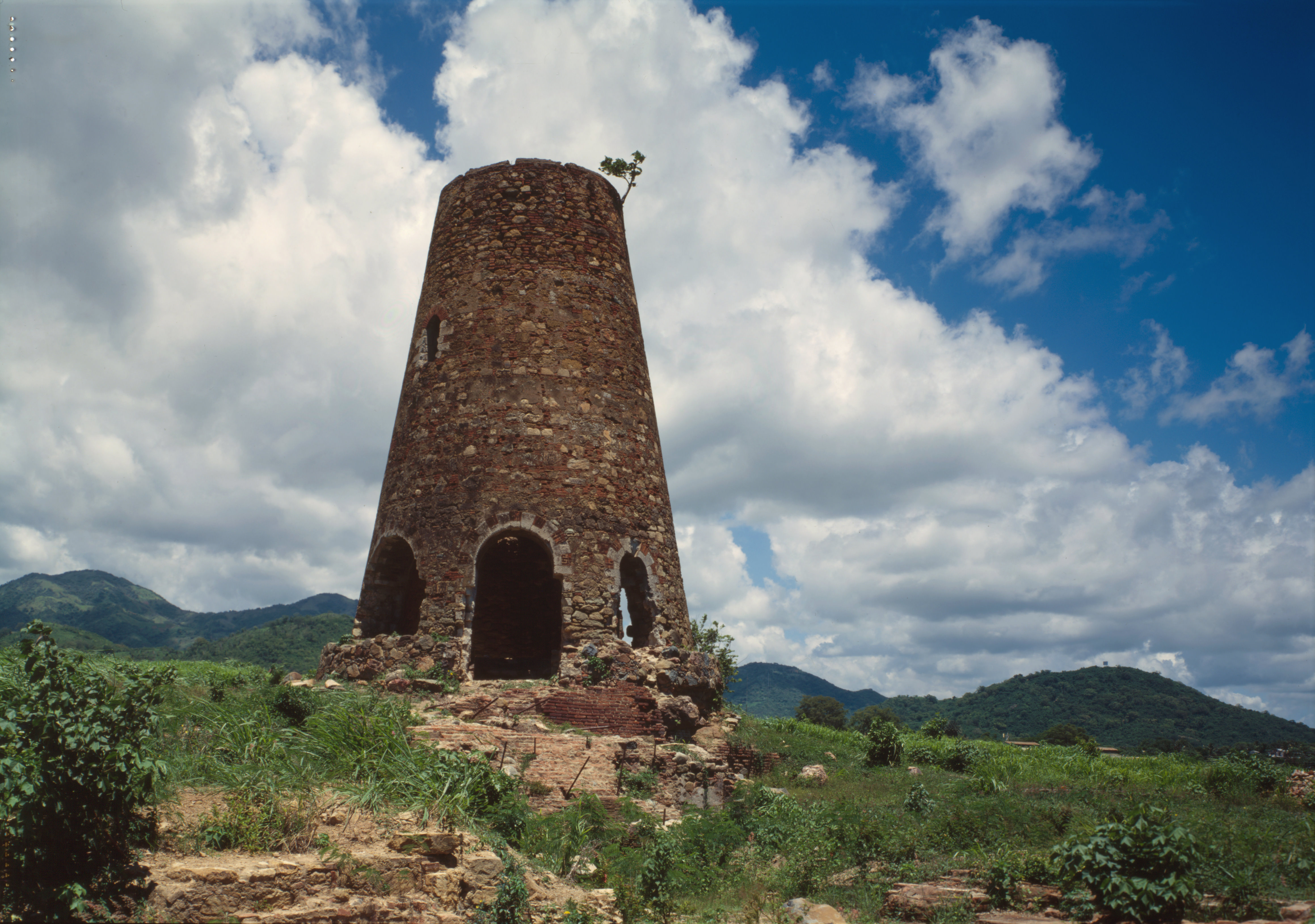

- Location within Puerto Rico
- Location: Avenida Central, Barrio Machete, Guayama, Puerto Rico
- Coordinates: 17°58′45″N 66°7′3″W
- Area: 5.5 acres (2.2 ha)
- NRHP reference No.: 76002249
- RNSZH No.: 2001-(RS)-23-JP-SH

Significant dates
- Added to NRHP: September 1, 1976
- Designated RNSZH: May 16, 2001

The Ingenio Azucarero Vives (English: Vives Sugar Plant), also known as Hacienda Vives, is a historic sugar mill complex with ruins of windmill and a processing building, in Barrio Machete of Guayama, in southern Puerto Rico. Sugarcane was ground by the windmill and the extracted juice was further processed in the processing building, by slaves. A slave uprising occurred here in the early 1800s.

It was listed on the National Register of Historic Places in 1976, and on the Puerto Rico Register of Historic Sites and Zones in 2001.

It is believed to have been constructed by 1828.

In 1976, the site was found to be significant as the only example of early industrial architecture and the only windmill in Puerto Rico.

It was documented by the Historic American Engineering Record program, with photographs by Jack Boucher.

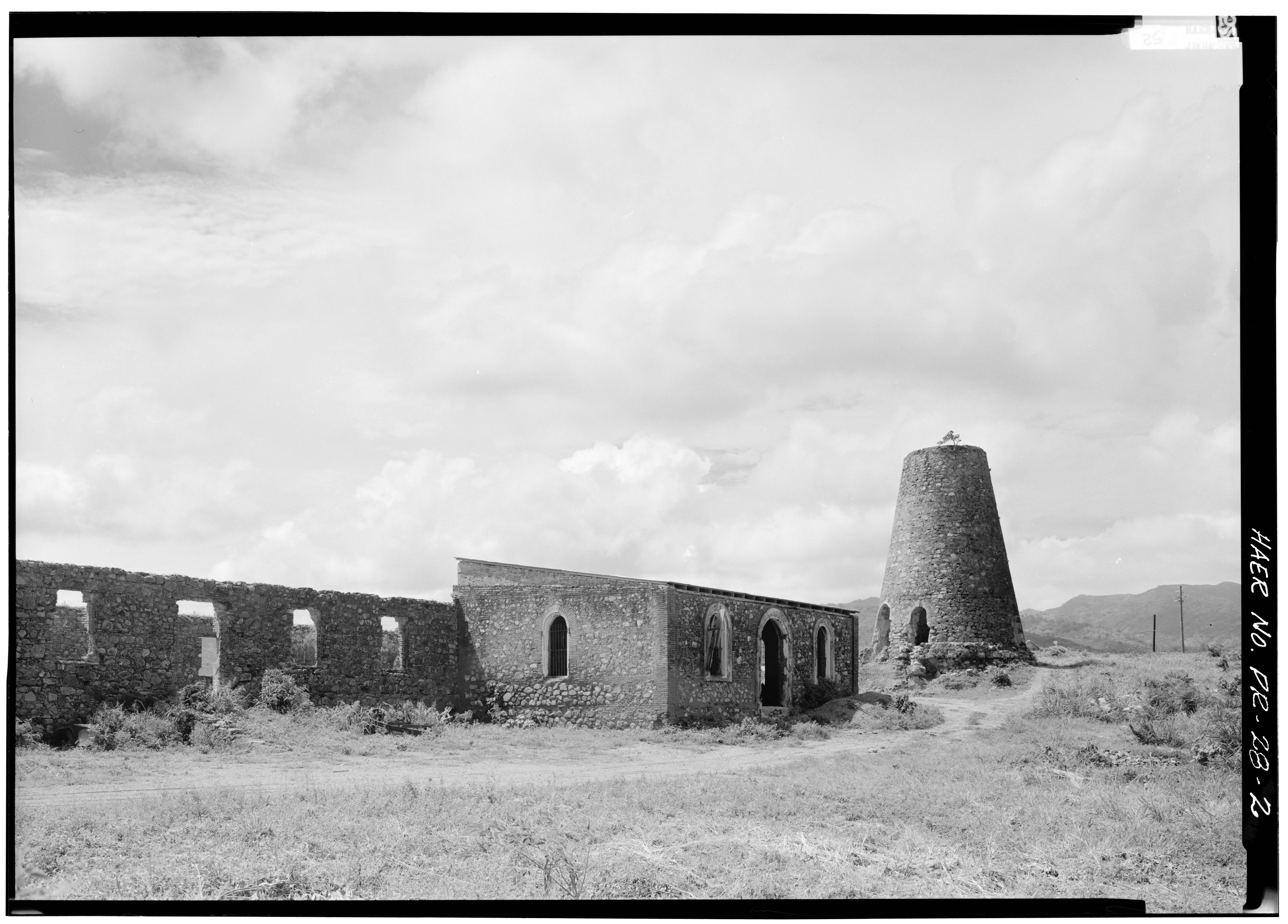
Mill building ruins

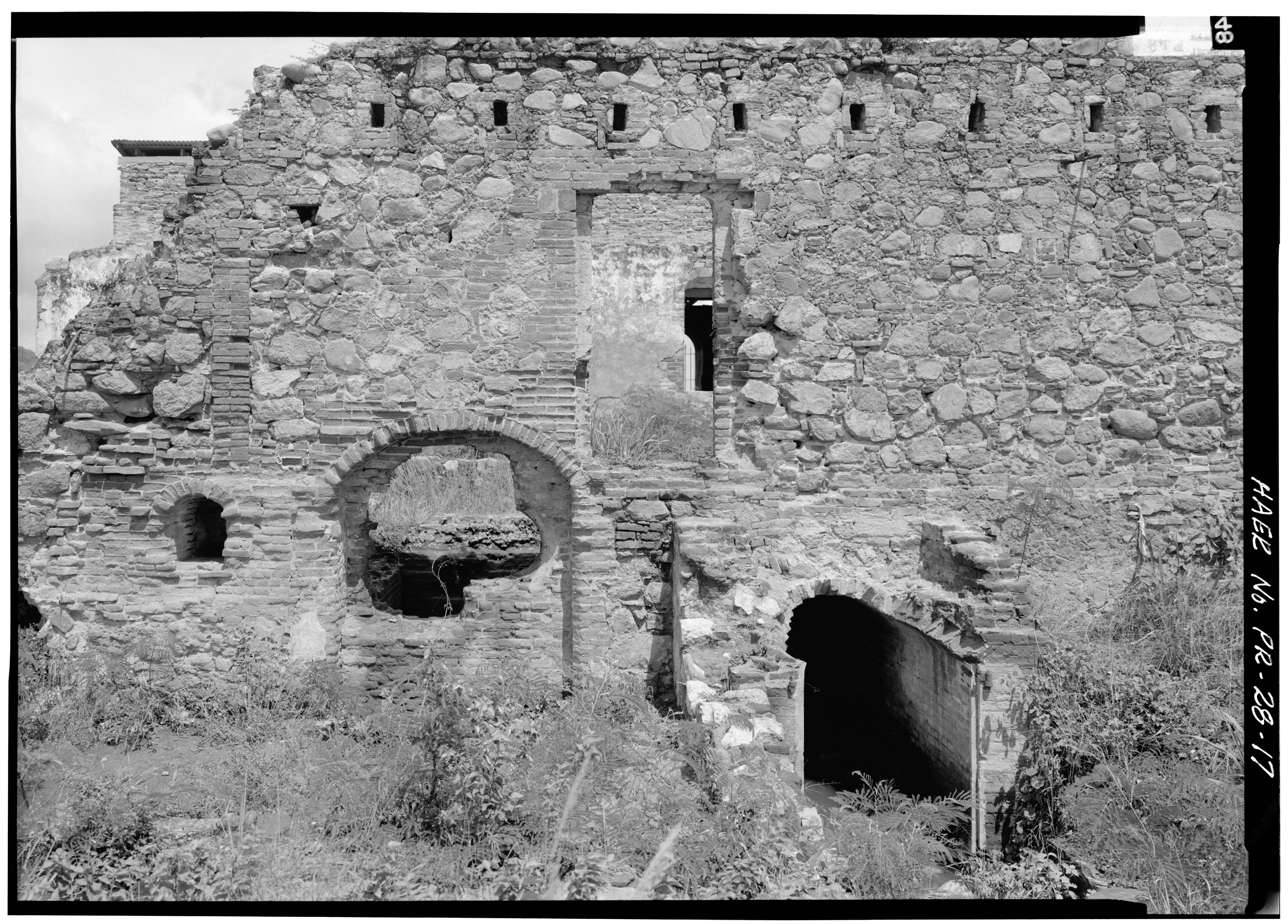
Opening in southern wall of mill building ruins

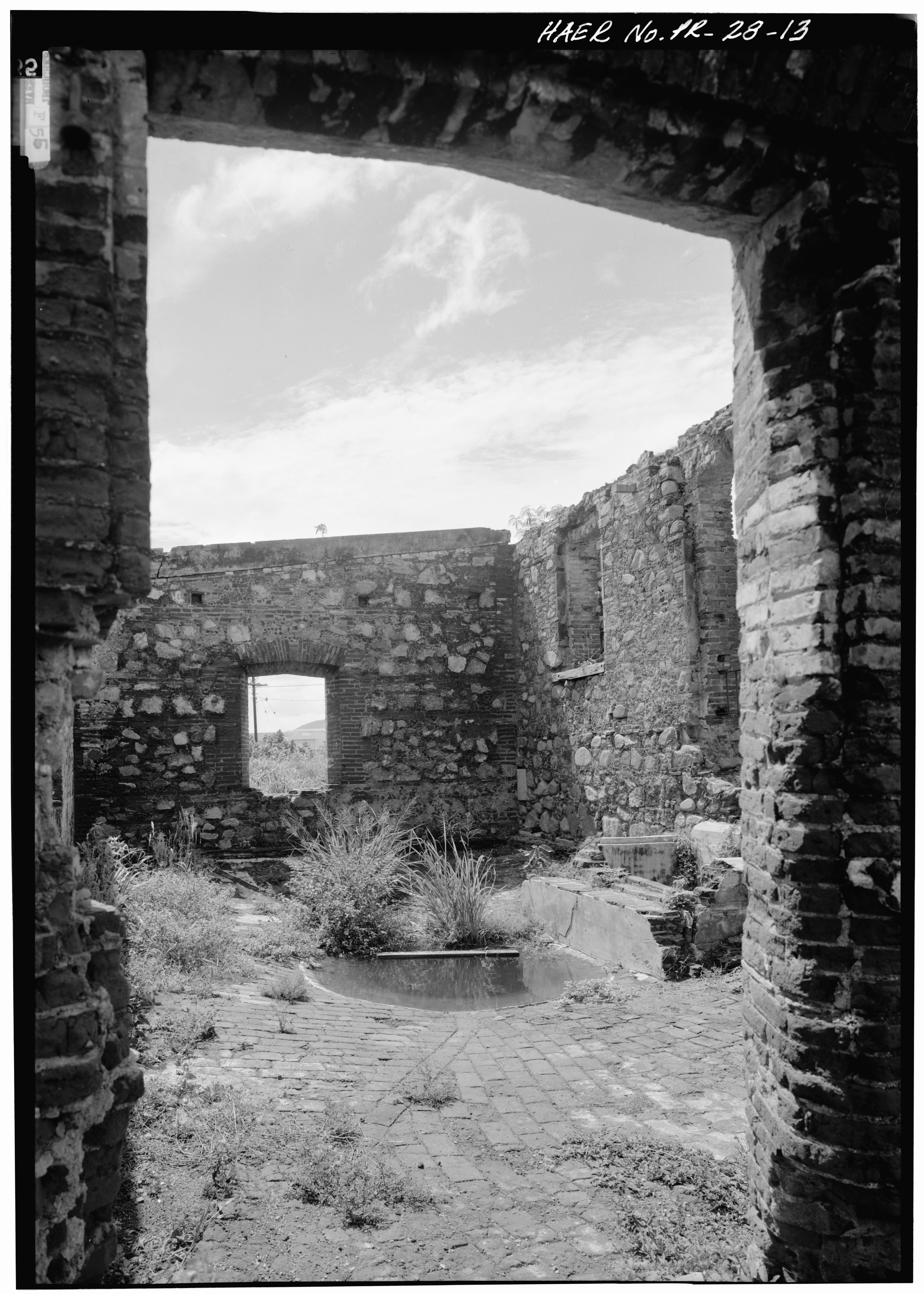
Interior view of mill building ruins

Modern photographs show that the complex has been restored.
