= Guayama Convention Center =

Sports venue in Guayama, Puerto Rico

Coordinates: 17°58′29.5″N 66°7′8.5″W

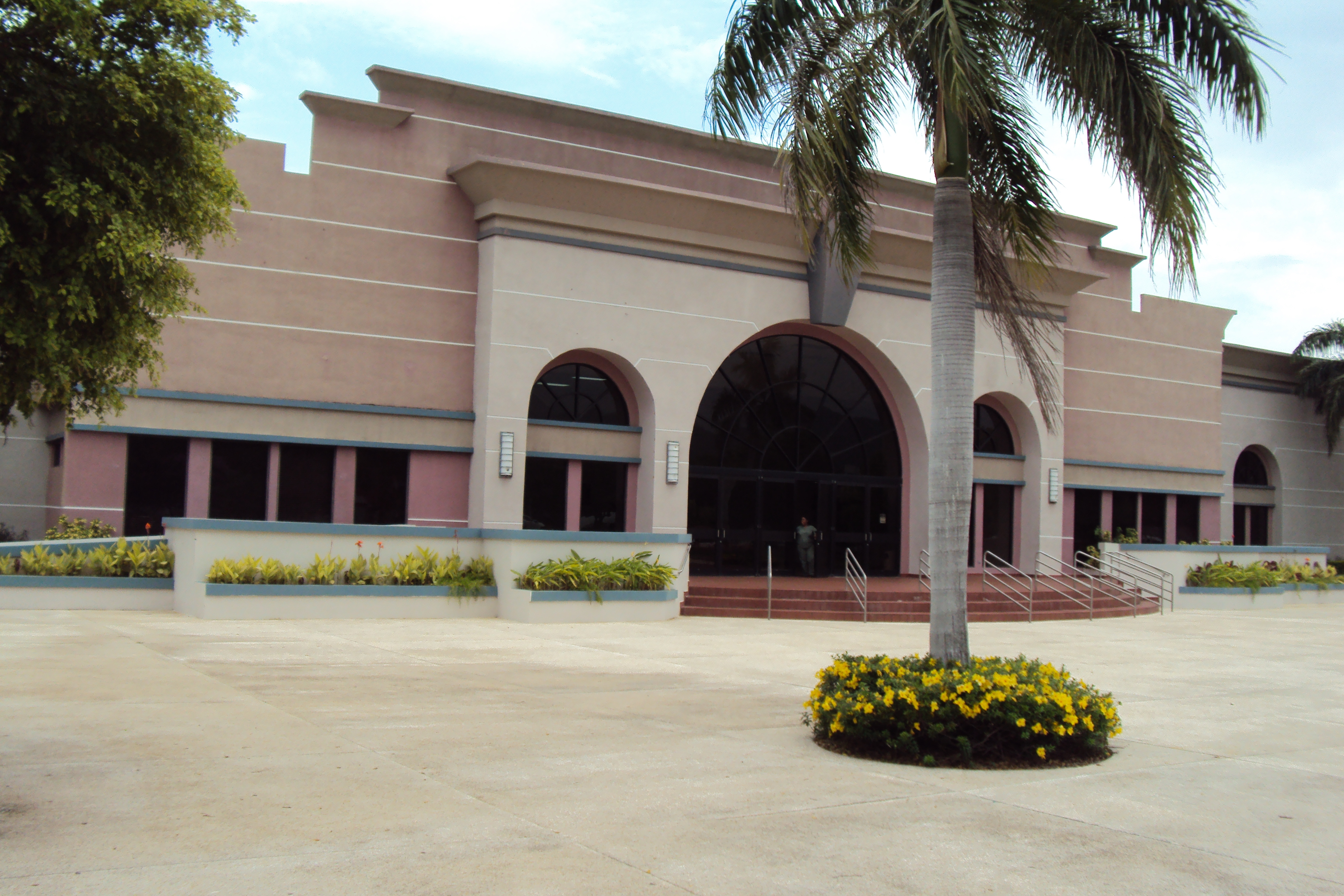
Guayama Convention Center, June 2011

Guayama Convention Center is a convention center in Guayama, Puerto Rico. It is one of the main performing arts and sports venues in Puerto Rico, especially in the south and southeast areas of the island. The center was built in 2000 and has a capacity of 2700.
