= Algarrobo, Guayama, Puerto Rico =

Barrio of Puerto Rico

Algarrobo
- Barrio
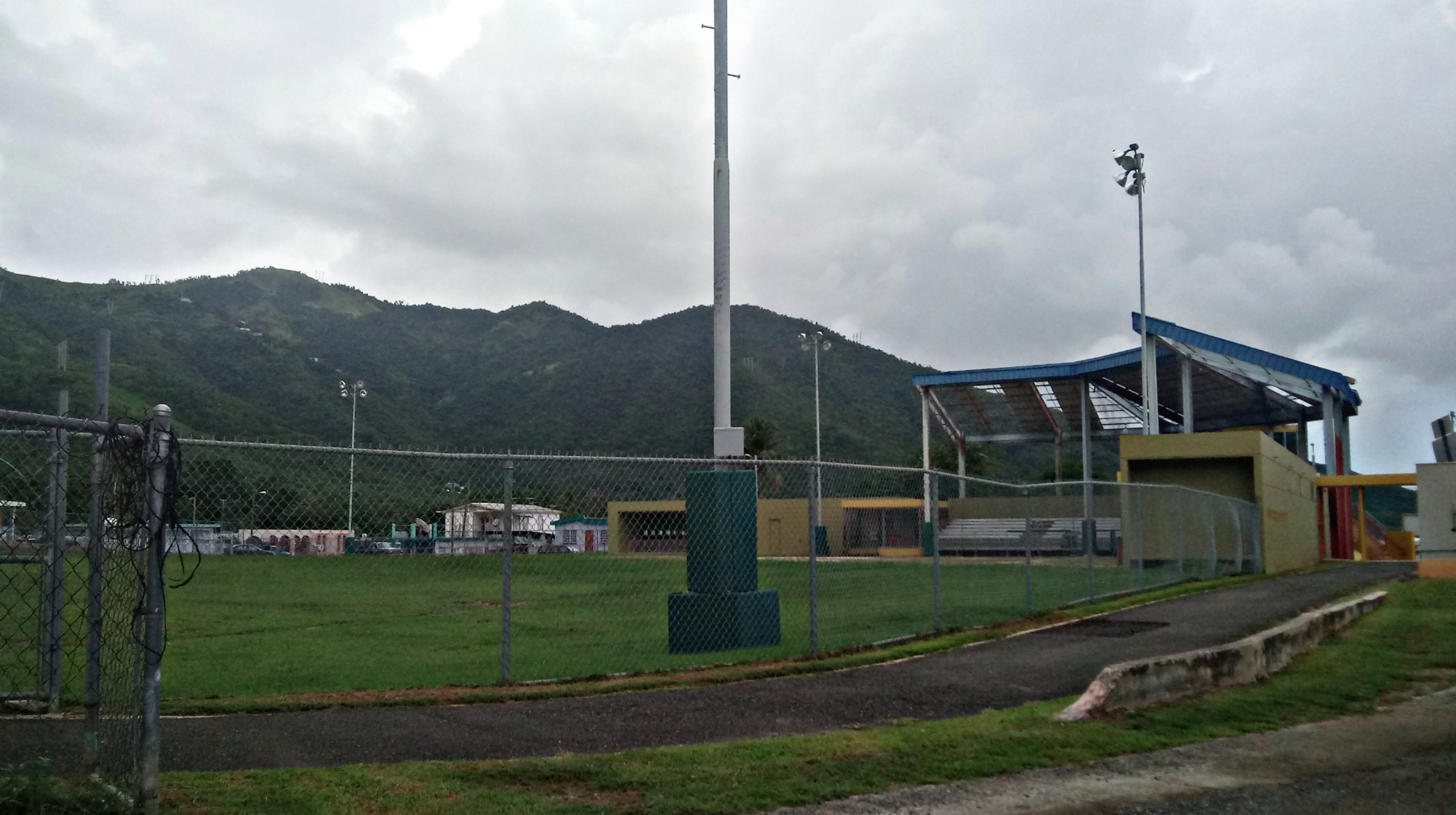
- School grounds in Algarrobo in 2020

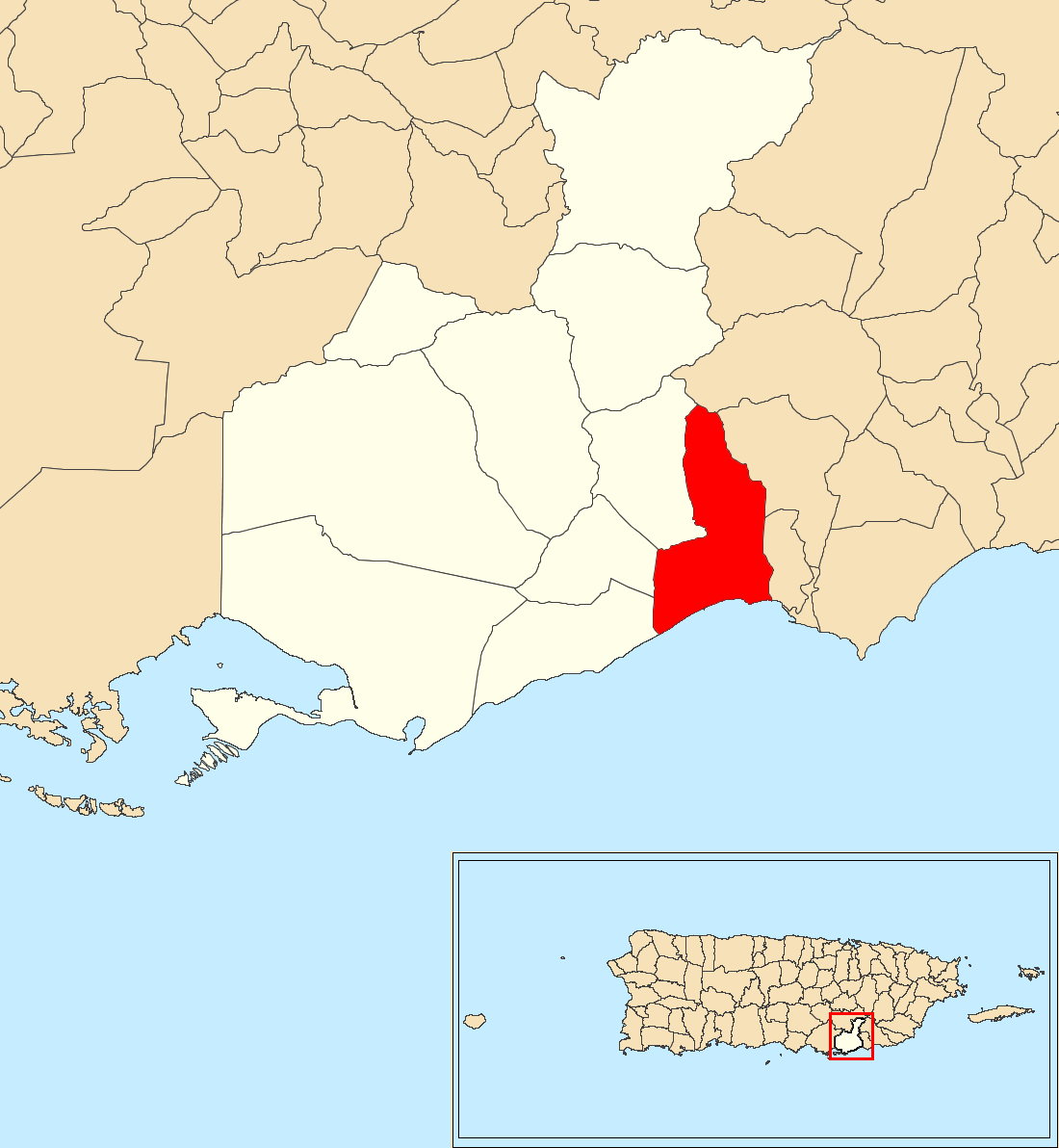
- Location of Algarrobo within the municipality of Guayama shown in red

- Location of Puerto Rico
- Coordinates: 17°58′55″N 66°05′05″W
- Commonwealth: Puerto Rico
- Municipality: Guayama

Area
  - Total: 4.64 sq mi (12.0 km^{2})
  - Land: 4.21 sq mi (10.9 km^{2})
  - Water: 0.43 sq mi (1.1 km^{2})
- Elevation: 102 ft (31 m)

Population (2010)
  - Total: 6,959
  - Density: 1,656.9/sq mi (639.7/km^{2})
- Source: 2010 Census
- Time zone: UTC−4 (AST)
- ZIP Code: 00784

Algarrobo is a barrio in the municipality of Guayama, Puerto Rico. Its population in 2010 was 6,959.

== History ==
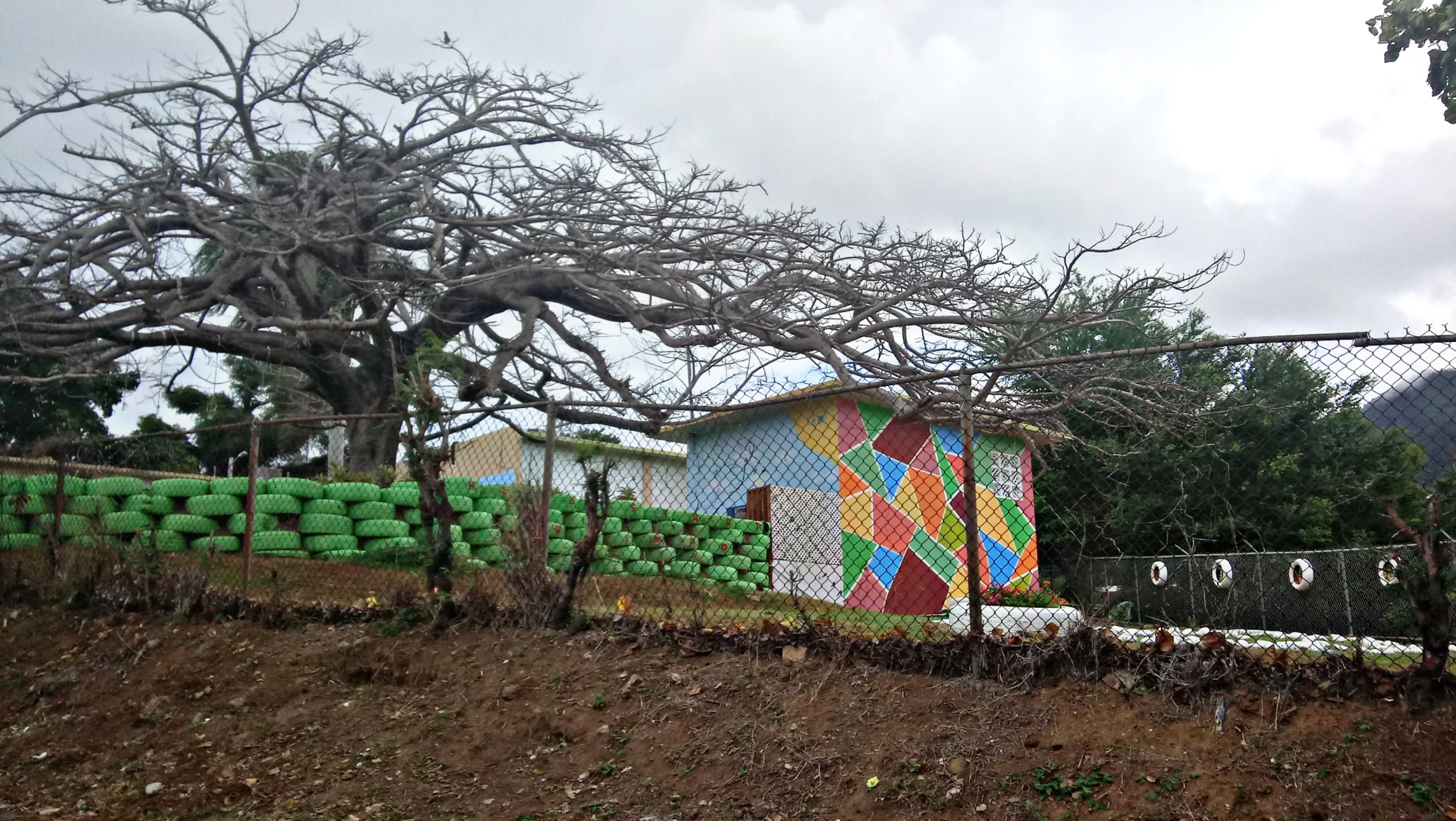
Elementary school building in Algarrobo in 2020

Algarrobo was in Spain's gazetteers until Puerto Rico was ceded by Spain in the aftermath of the Spanish–American War under the terms of the Treaty of Paris of 1898 and became an unincorporated territory of the United States. In 1899, the United States Department of War conducted a census of Puerto Rico finding that the combined population of Algarrobo barrio and Pozo Hondo barrio was 1,080.

Historical population
Census	Pop.	Note	%±
1910	798		—
1920	906		13.5%
1930	2,141		136.3%
1940	1,337		−37.6%
1950	1,514		13.2%
1960	1,627		7.5%
1970	0		−100.0%
1980	5,203		—
1990	6,383		22.7%
2000	7,377		15.6%
2010	6,959		−5.7%
U.S. Decennial Census; 1900 (N/A) 1910-1930; 1930-1950 1980-2000 2010

== See also ==
- List of communities in Puerto Rico
