= Pozo Hondo, Guayama, Puerto Rico =

Barrio of Puerto Rico

Pozo Hondo
- Barrio
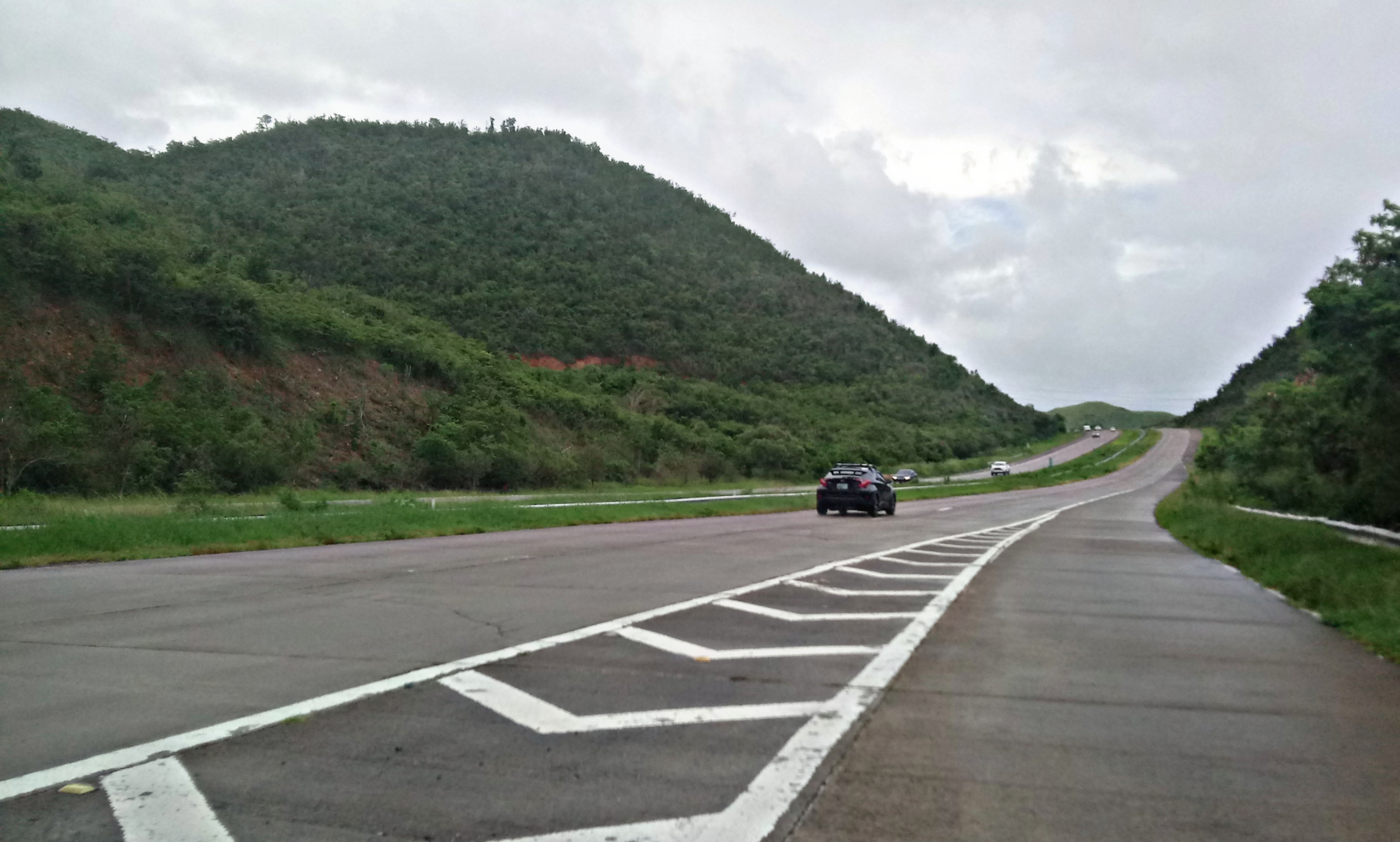
- PR-53 in Pozo Hondo

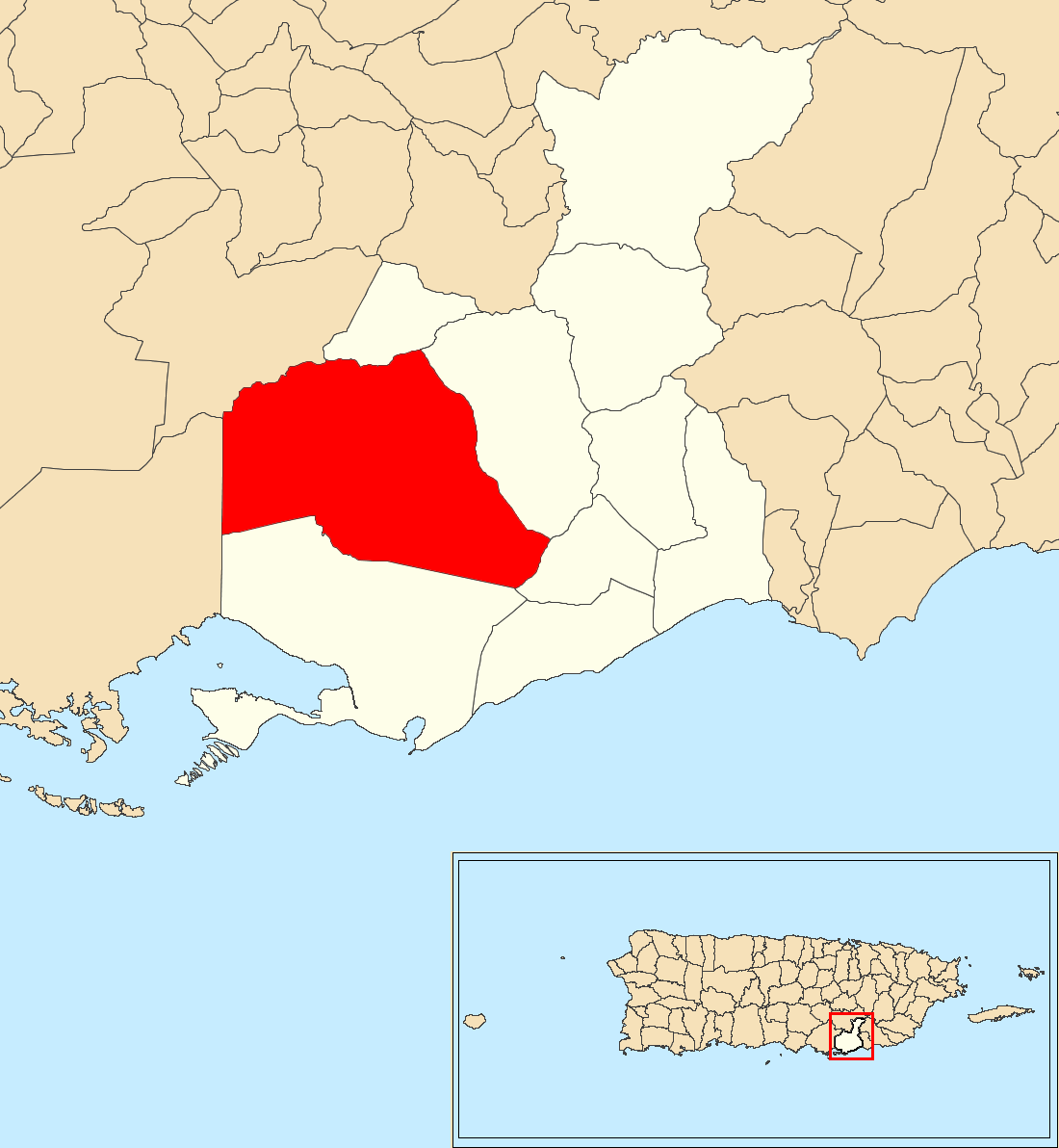
- Location of Pozo Hondo within the municipality of Guayama shown in red

- Location of Puerto Rico
- Coordinates: 17°59′55″N 66°10′05″W
- Commonwealth: Puerto Rico
- Municipality: Guayama

Area
  - Total: 13.68 sq mi (35.4 km^{2})
  - Land: 13.62 sq mi (35.3 km^{2})
  - Water: 0.06 sq mi (0.16 km^{2})
- Elevation: 315 ft (96 m)

Population (2010)
  - Total: 1,263
  - Density: 92.7/sq mi (35.8/km^{2})
- Source: 2010 Census
- Time zone: UTC−4 (AST)
- ZIP Code: 00784

Pozo Hondo is a barrio in the municipality of Guayama, Puerto Rico. Its population in 2010 was 1,263.

== History ==
Pozo Hondo was in Spain's gazetteers until Puerto Rico was ceded by Spain in the aftermath of the Spanish–American War under the terms of the Treaty of Paris of 1898 and became an unincorporated territory of the United States. In 1899, the United States Department of War conducted a census of Puerto Rico finding that the combined population of Pozo Hondo barrio and Algarrobo barrio was 1,080.

Historical population
Census	Pop.	Note	%±
1910	749		—
1920	665		−11.2%
1930	1,086		63.3%
1940	1,221		12.4%
1950	807		−33.9%
1960	559		−30.7%
1970	643		15.0%
1980	694		7.9%
1990	840		21.0%
2000	885		5.4%
2010	1,263		42.7%
U.S. Decennial Census; 1900 (N/A) 1910-1930; 1930-1950 1980-2000 2010

== See also ==
- List of communities in Puerto Rico
