= Jobos, Guayama, Puerto Rico =

Barrio of Puerto Rico

Jobos
- Barrio
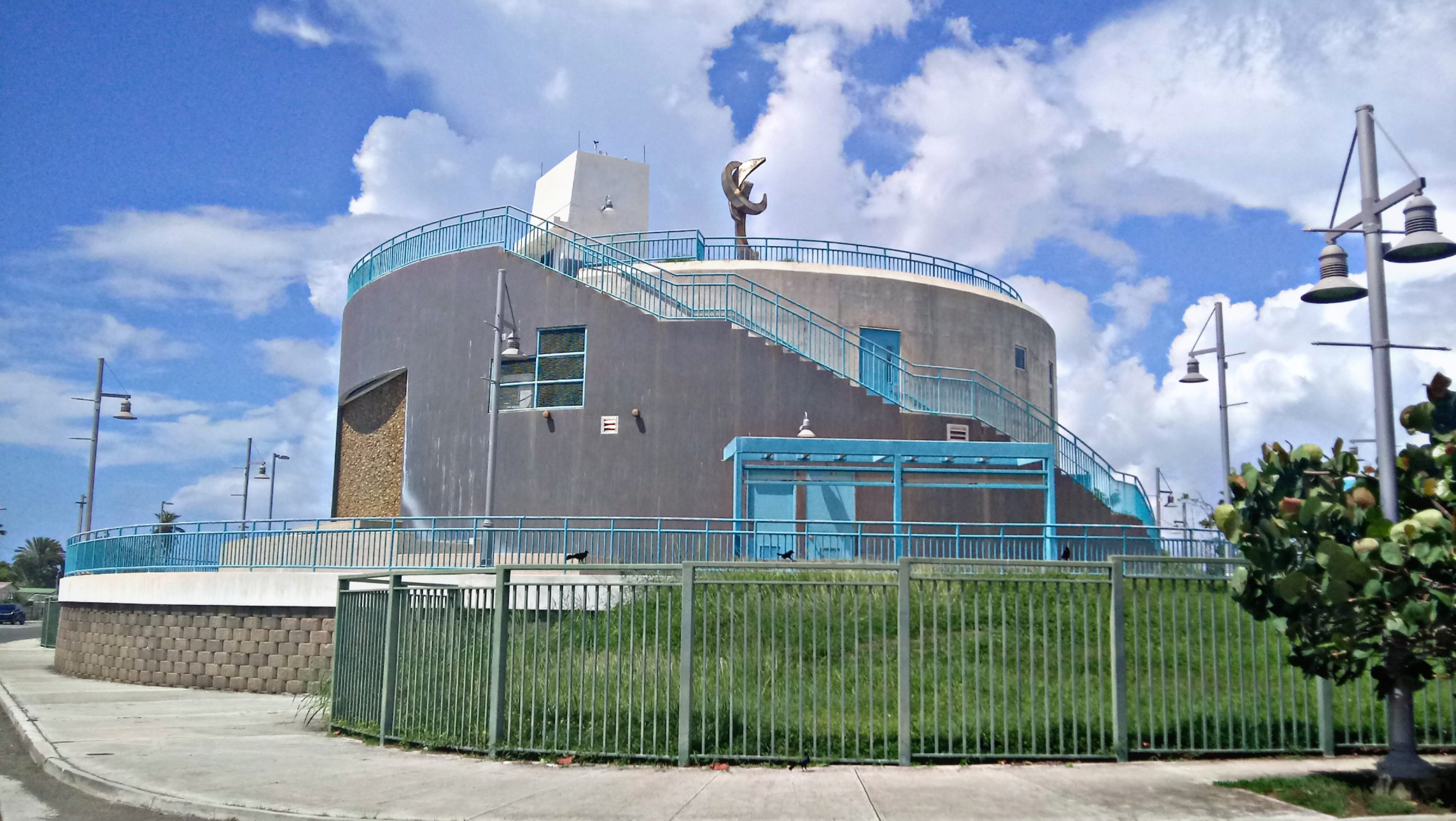
- Paseo Tablado Punta Pozuelo in Jobos

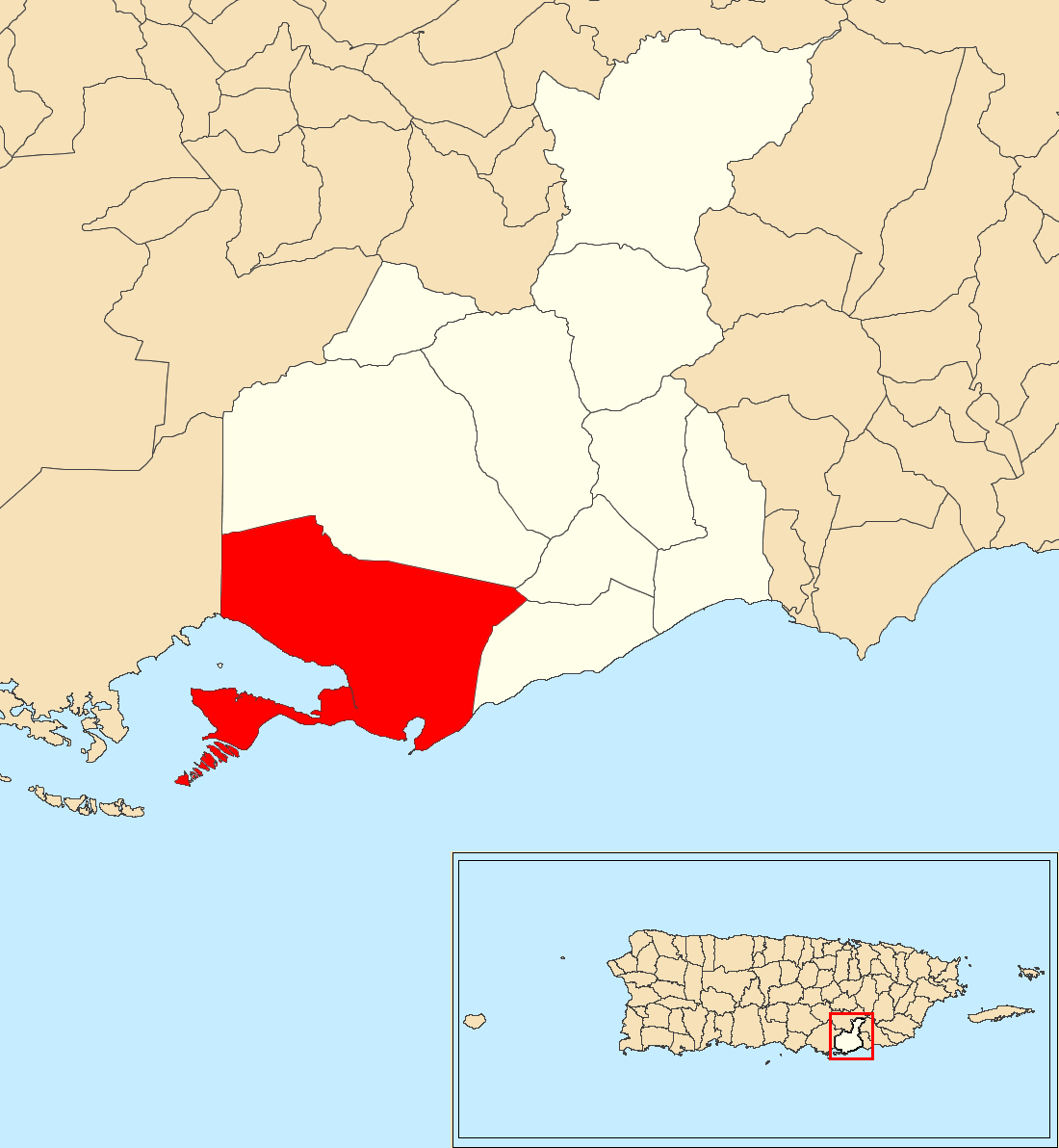
- Location of Jobox within the municipality of Guayama shown in red

- Location of Puerto Rico
- Coordinates: 17°57′09″N 66°10′51″W
- Commonwealth: Puerto Rico
- Municipality: Guayama

Area
  - Total: 16.61 sq mi (43.0 km^{2})
  - Land: 11.79 sq mi (30.5 km^{2})
  - Water: 4.82 sq mi (12.5 km^{2})
- Elevation: 10 ft (3.0 m)

Population (2010)
  - Total: 8,286
  - Density: 702.8/sq mi (271.4/km^{2})
- Source: 2010 Census
- Time zone: UTC−4 (AST)
- ZIP Code: 00784

Jobos is a barrio in the municipality of Guayama, Puerto Rico. Its population in 2010 was 8,286.

== History ==
Jobos was in Spain's gazetteers until Puerto Rico was ceded by Spain in the aftermath of the Spanish–American War under the terms of the Treaty of Paris of 1898 and became an unincorporated territory of the United States. In 1899, the United States Department of War conducted a census of Puerto Rico finding that the population of Jobos barrio was 1,186.

Historical population
Census	Pop.	Note	%±
1900	1,186		—
1910	1,725		45.4%
1920	2,037		18.1%
1930	2,842		39.5%
1940	3,735		31.4%
1950	4,356		16.6%
1960	5,722		31.4%
1970	5,776		0.9%
1980	6,947		20.3%
1990	6,993		0.7%
2000	7,706		10.2%
2010	8,286		7.5%
U.S. Decennial Census; 1899 (shown as 1900) 1910-1930; 1930-1950 1980-2000 2010

== See also ==
- List of communities in Puerto Rico
