= Carmen, Guayama, Puerto Rico =

Barrio of Puerto Rico

Carmen
- Barrio
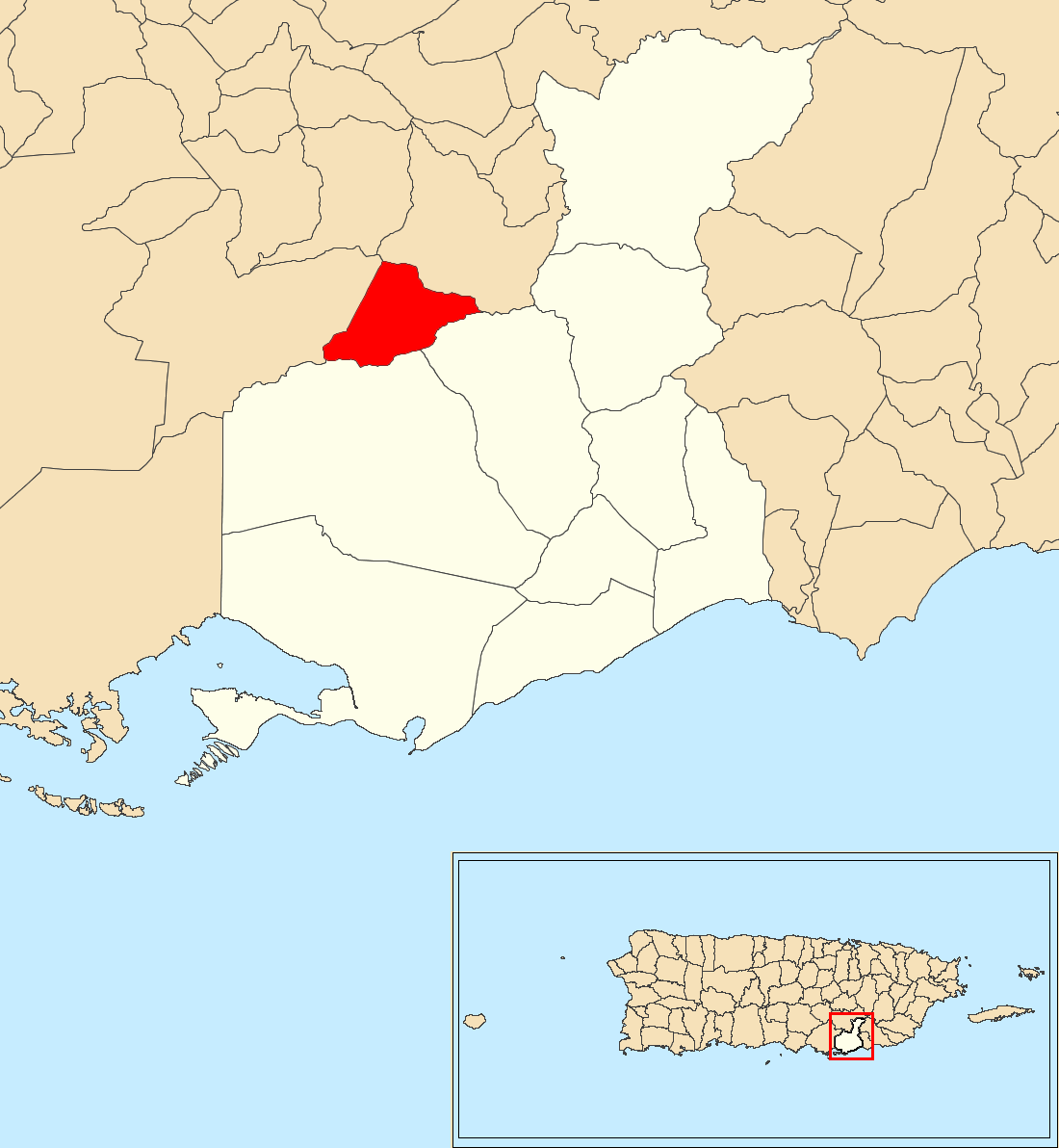
- Location of Carmen within the municipality of Guayama shown in red

- Location of Puerto Rico
- Coordinates: 18°02′10″N 66°09′45″W
- Commonwealth: Puerto Rico
- Municipality: Guayama

Area
  - Total: 2.31 sq mi (6.0 km^{2})
  - Land: 2.31 sq mi (6.0 km^{2})
  - Water: 0 sq mi (0 km^{2})
- Elevation: 1,289 ft (393 m)

Population (2010)
  - Total: 619
  - Density: 268/sq mi (103/km^{2})
- Source: 2010 Census
- Time zone: UTC−4 (AST)
- ZIP Code: 00784

Carmen is a barrio in the municipality of Guayama, Puerto Rico, with a 2010 population of 619.

== History ==
Carmen was in Spain's gazetteers until Puerto Rico was ceded by Spain in the aftermath of the Spanish–American War under the terms of the Treaty of Paris of 1898 and became an unincorporated territory of the United States. In 1899, the United States Department of War conducted a census of Puerto Rico finding that the population of Carmen barrio was 784.

Historical population
Census	Pop.	Note	%±
1900	784		—
1910	711		−9.3%
1920	750		5.5%
1930	549		−26.8%
1940	702		27.9%
1950	534		−23.9%
1960	601		12.5%
1970	619		3.0%
1980	663		7.1%
1990	773		16.6%
2000	682		−11.8%
2010	619		−9.2%
U.S. Decennial Census; 1899 (shown as 1900) 1910-1930; 1930-1950 1980-2000 2010

== See also ==
- List of communities in Puerto Rico
