= Iglesia de San Antonio de Padua =

Historic church in Guayama, Puerto Rico

San Antonio de Padua Church
- Parish Church of San Antonio de Padua
- Iglesia Parroquial de San Antonio de Padua
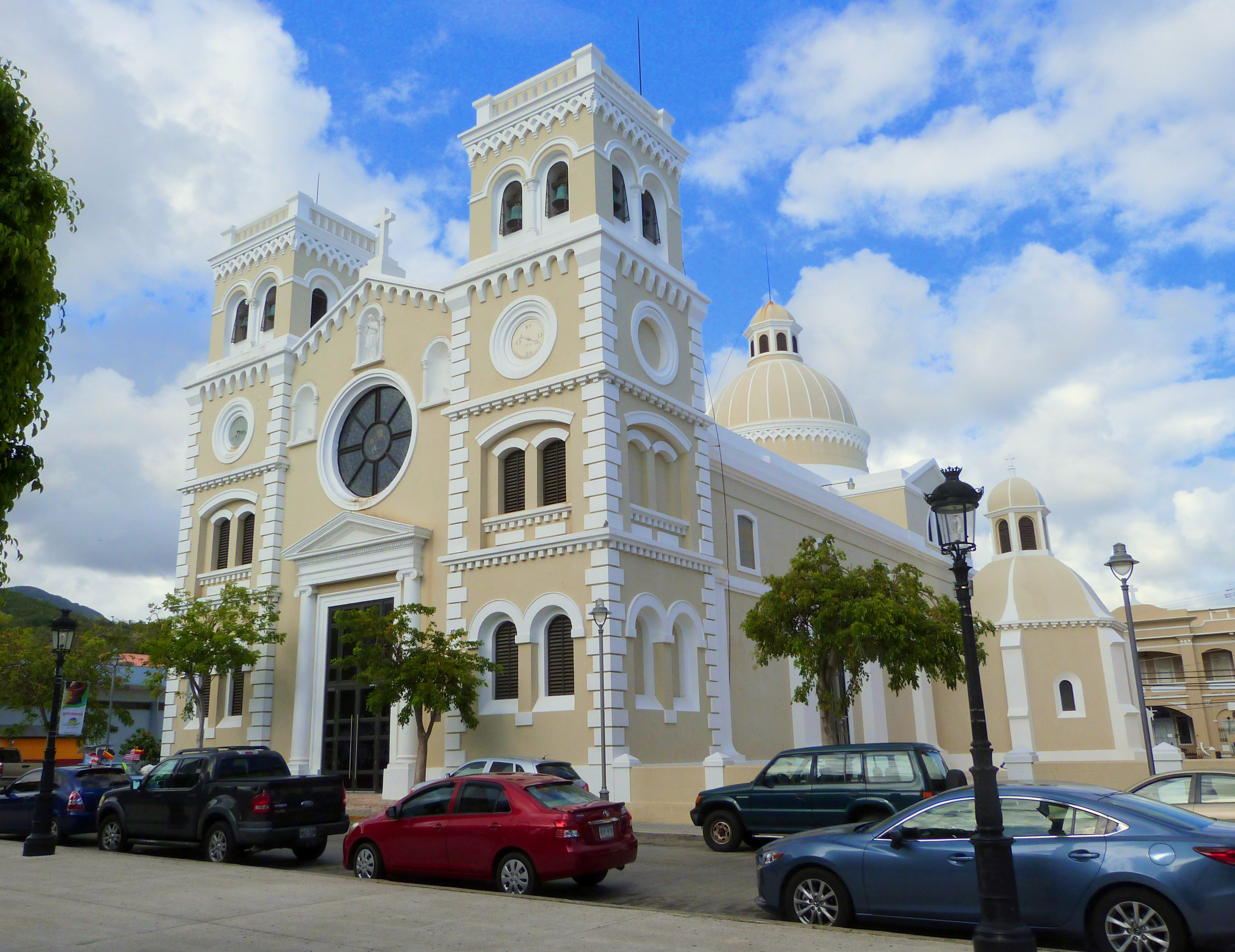
- The church in 2017

- Location in Puerto Rico
- 17°59′07″N 66°06′46″W
- Location: Guayama Pueblo
- Address: 5 Ashford Street; Guayama, Puerto Rico
- Country: Puerto Rico
- Denomination: Roman Catholic Church

History
- Status: Parish church
- Founded: 1736
- Dedication: Anthony of Padua

Architecture
- Heritage designation: NRHP
- Designated: 1976
- Architectural type: Romanesque Revival
- Completed: 1874

Administration
- Diocese: Ponce
- Iglesia Parroquial de San Antonio de Padua de Guayama
- U.S. National Register of Historic Places
- Built: 18th century, rebuilt c. 1874
- NRHP reference No.: 76002248
- Added to NRHP: July 30, 1976

The San Antonio de Padua Parish Church (Spanish: Iglesia Parroquial de San Antonio de Padua) is a historic Roman Catholic parish church located in Guayama, Puerto Rico. The parish was erected in 1736 and the first church building completed no later than 1775. The original appearance of the building is unknown, but some of the eighteenth century walls may survive in the present structure. The building was rebuilt twice in the nineteenth century and the present appearance dates from 1874. It takes an overall Romanesque form, while the details exhibit the eclecticism that characterized much Puerto Rican architecture in the later 1800s.

The church was inscribed on the National Register of Historic Places in 1976.

== Gallery ==
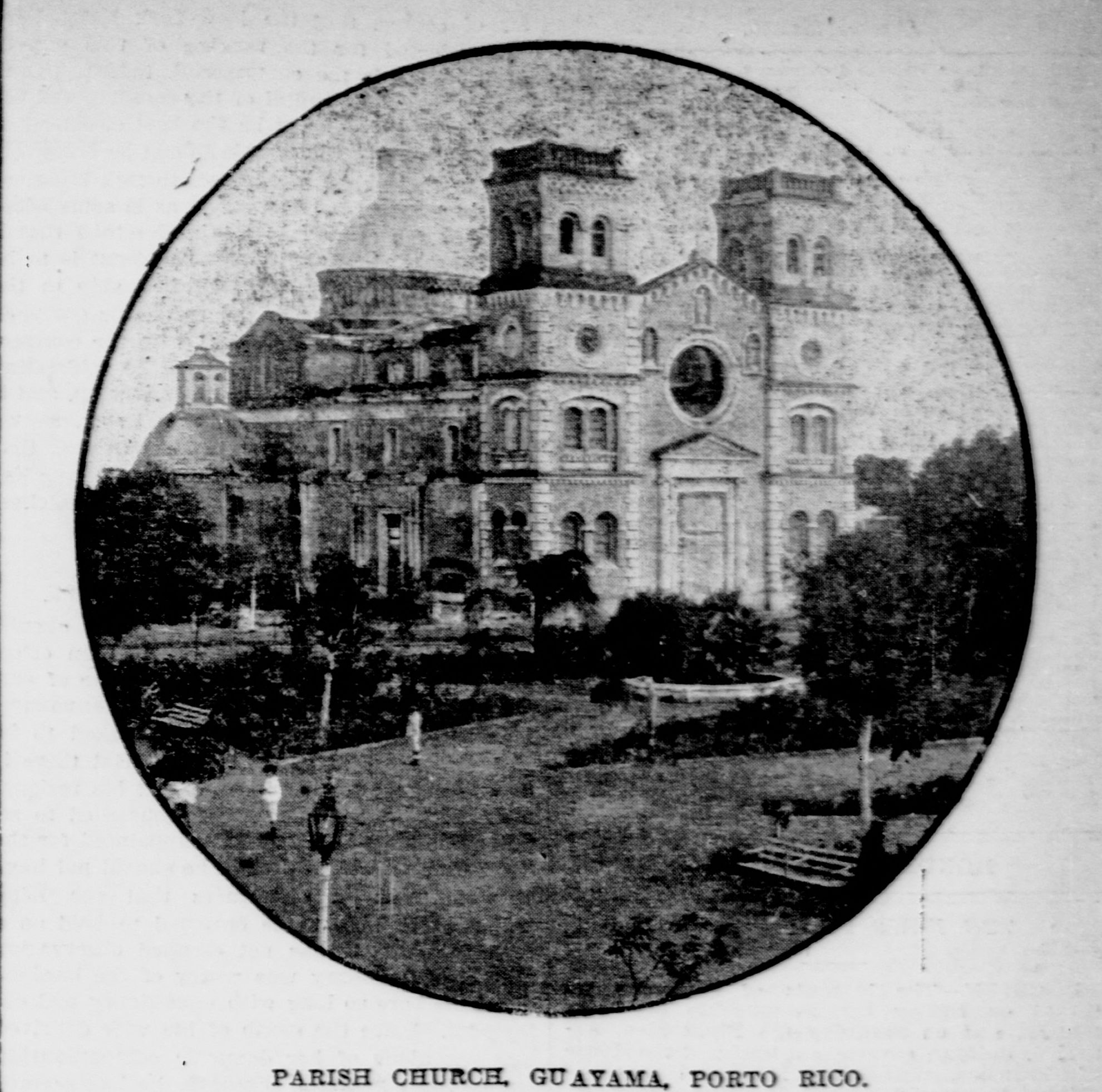
The church in 1902

== See also ==
- National Register of Historic Places listings in southern Puerto Rico
