= Guayama, Puerto Rico =

City and municipality of Puerto Rico

Guayama, Puerto Rico Municipio Autónomo de Guayama
- Municipality
- Autonomous Municipality of Guayama
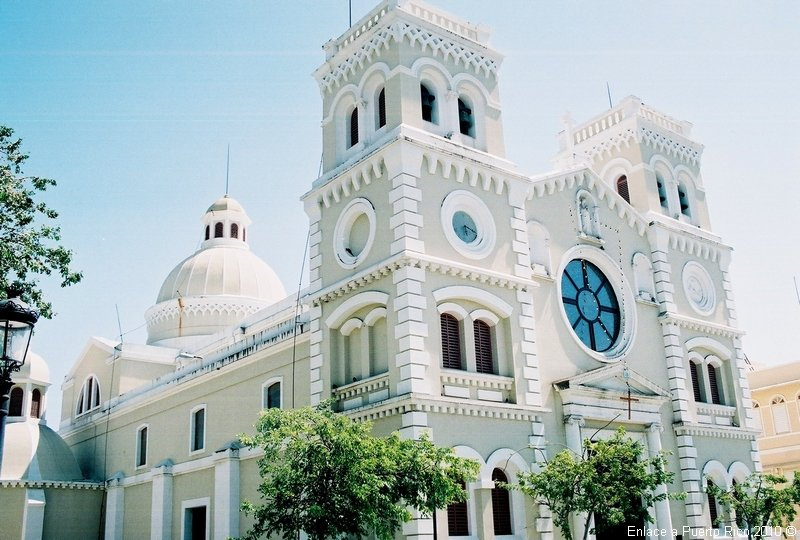
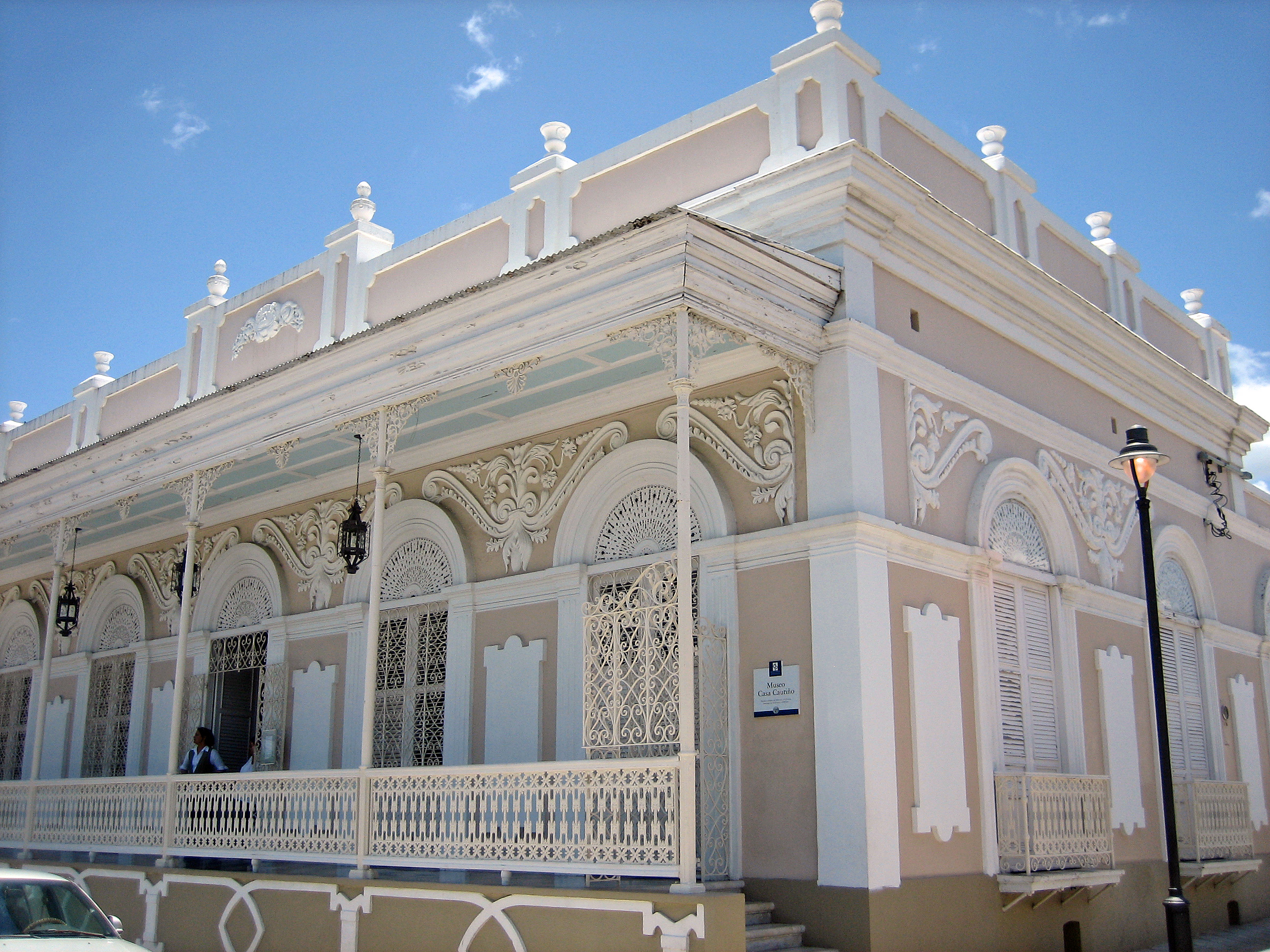
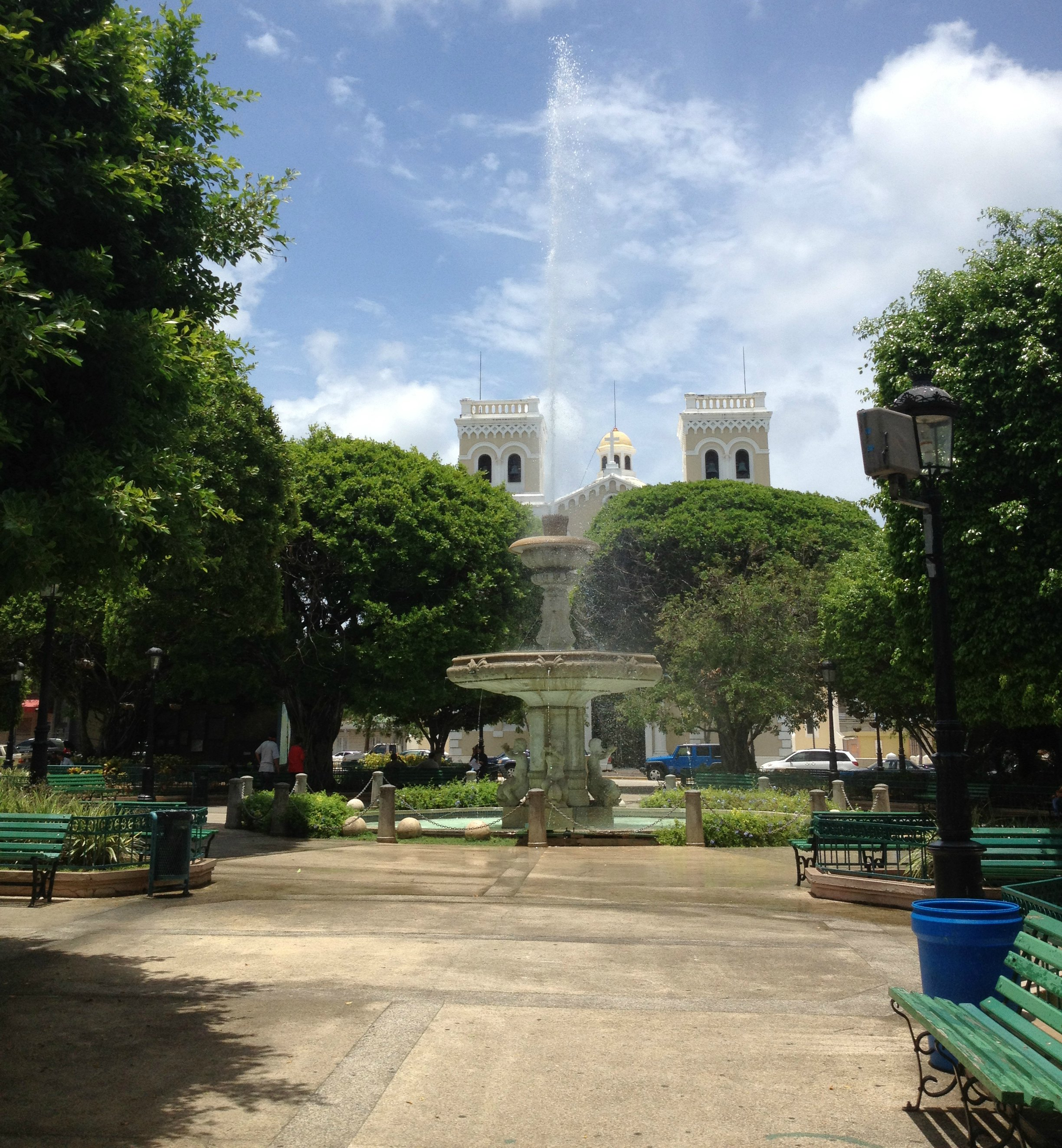
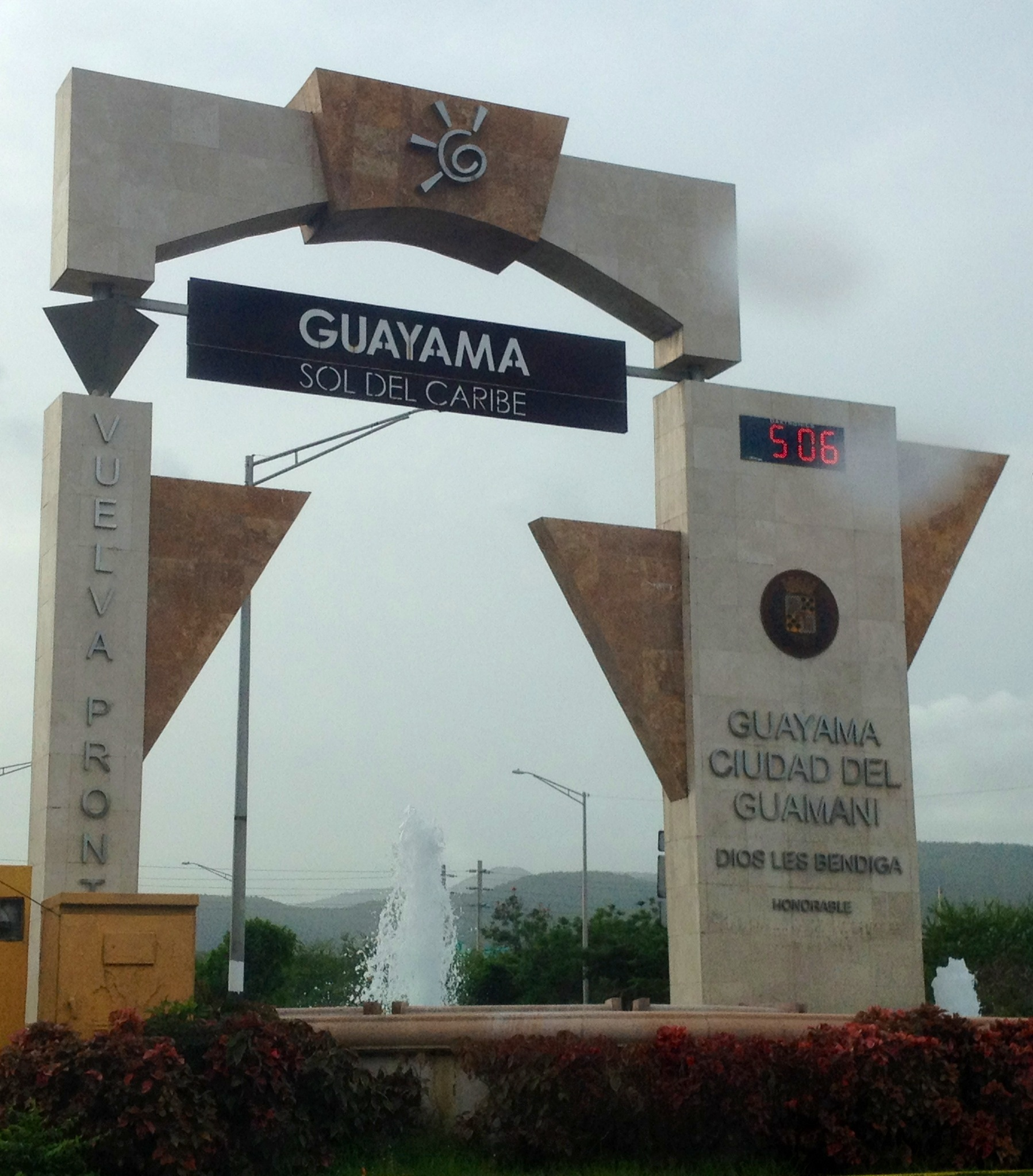
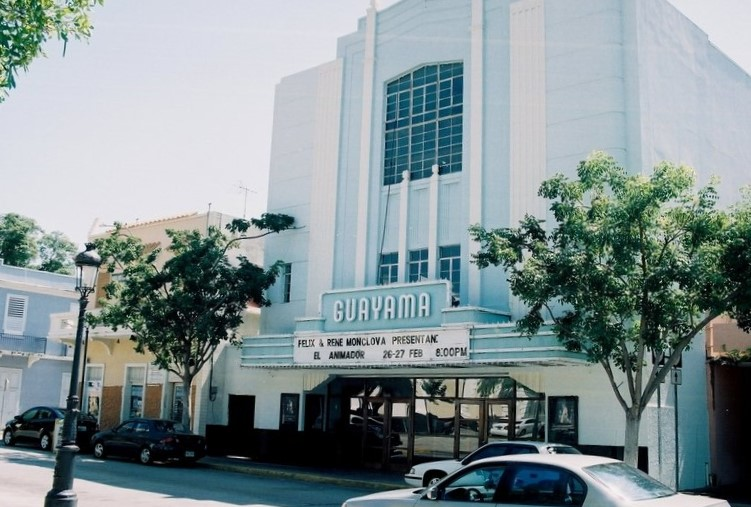
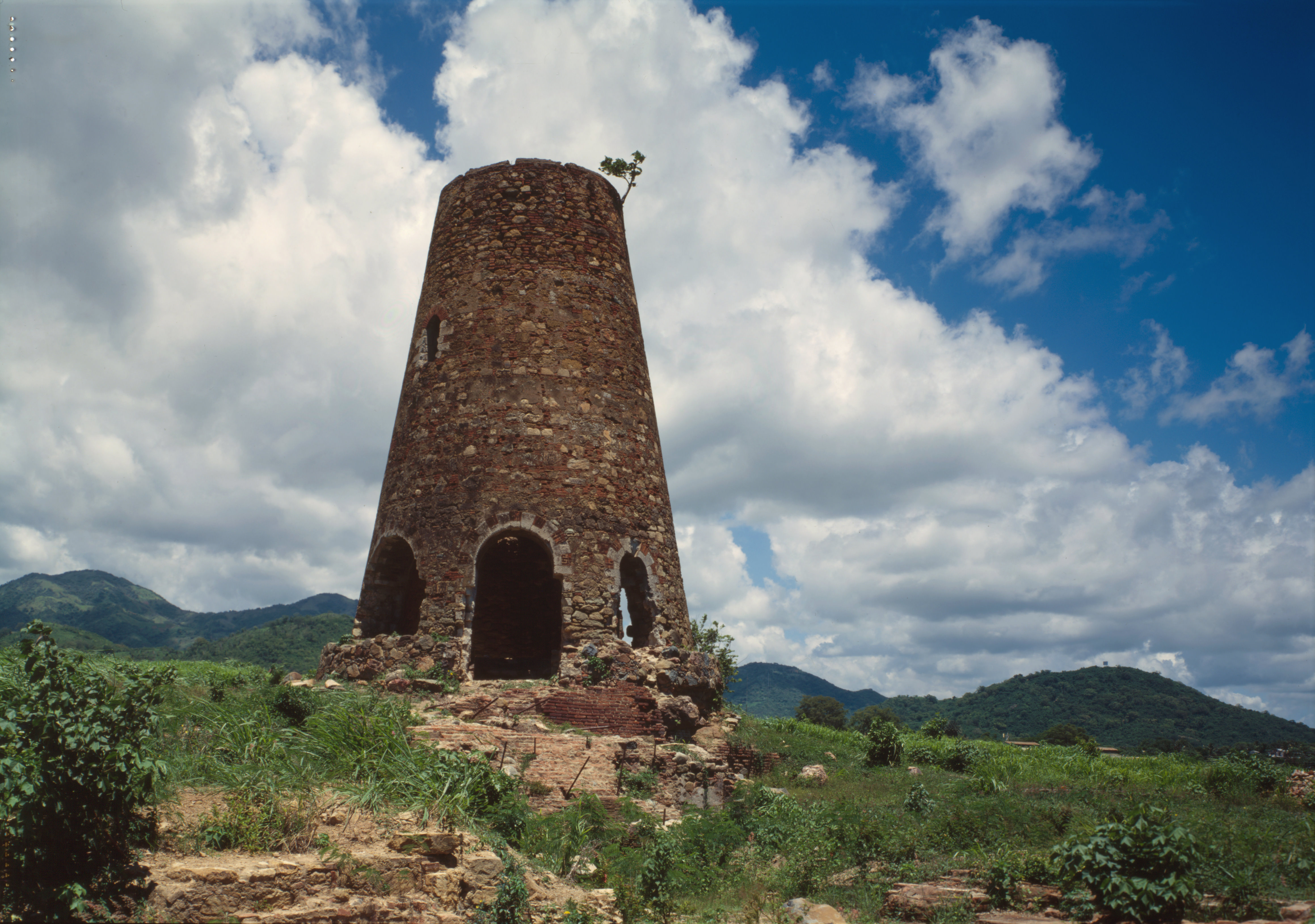
- From top, left to right: Iglesia de San Antonio de Padua; Casa Cautiño; Colón Town Square; PR-54; Teatro Guayama; Hacienda Vives

- Flag Coat of arms
- Nicknames: "La ciudad del Guamaní"; Spanish for "The City of the Guamaní" "El pueblo de los brujos" Spanish for "The Witch City"
- Map of Puerto Rico highlighting Guayama Municipality
- Coordinates: 17°58′27″N 66°06′36″W
- Sovereign state: United States
- Commonwealth: Puerto Rico
- Founded: January 29, 1736
- Founder: Matías de Abadía
- Barrios: 10 barrios: Algarrobo; Caimital; Carite; Carmen; Guamaní; Guayama barrio-pueblo; Jobos; Machete; Palmas; Pozo Hondo

Government
  - Mayor: O'Brian Vázquez Molina (PPD)

Area
  - Municipality: 106.8 sq mi (277 km^{2})
  - Land: 65.0 sq mi (168 km^{2})
  - Water: 41.8 sq mi (108 km^{2})
- Elevation: 239 ft (73 m)

Population (2020)
  - Municipality: 36,614
  - Estimate (2025): 34,043 ▼
  - Rank: 30th in Puerto Rico
  - Density: 563/sq mi (217/km^{2})
  - Metro: 68,442 (MSA)
- Demonym: Guayameses
- Time zone: UTC−4 (Atlantic (AST))
- ZIP Codes: 00784, 00785
- Area code: 787/939
- FIPS code: 72-32221
- GNIS feature ID: 1610860
- Website: www.viveelencanto.com

Guayama (Spanish: [ɡwaˈʝama], locally [waˈʝama]), officially the Autonomous Municipality of Guayama (Spanish: Municipio Autónomo de Guayama), is a city and municipality on the Caribbean coast of Puerto Rico. As of the 2020 U.S. census, the city had a population of 36,614. It is the center of the Guayama metropolitan area with a population of 68,442 in 2020.

== Etymology and nicknames ==
The original name of the city is San Antonio de Padua de Guayama, named after the saint Anthony of Padua; as with other settlement names in Puerto Rico, the name was eventually shortened to Guayama. Guayama comes from the name of a Taíno cacique (chief), who was leader of the tribes in the southeastern coast of Puerto Rico. The Taíno word Guayama (wayama) is said to mean "great place" or "big open space". Another legend tells that the name of the town comes from the name of a woman called Juana Guayama who is said to have been an early owner of the land around Guayama and granter of the land in modern-day Machete where the town was later founded.

The first nickname of the city was Ciudad del Guamaní ("city of the Guamaní [River]") after the river that crosses the municipality. The name of this river might be related to the name Guayama, and it has been important to the city since its early founding. A more modern and more popular nickname for the city is Pueblo de los brujos ("town of witches" or "town of warlocks") or Pueblo brujo ("witch town"). This nickname traces its origins to a popular story that tells that residents of the city would bring a kind of leaf called hoja bruja ("witch leaf") to baseball games to "scare" the opposing team by pretending to cast spells on them. The town's baseball team then adopted the hoja bruja as their symbol. Another story tells that the nickname comes from a legendary baseball player from the city's local team, Moncho El Brujo, who according to legend owed his success as a pitcher to witchcraft. Regardless of the origin of the nickname, residents of Guayama are often called brujos and their basketball team now carries the name Brujos de Guayama ("Guayama Warlocks").

== History ==
During the early years of the Spanish colonization, the region known today as Guayama was inhabited by Taíno native people. The indigenous population in this area decreased due to slavery and migration to the Lesser Antilles. The following centuries, the region was under attack from the Taíno rebellion, Caribs and pirates. The town was founded on January 29, 1736, as San Antonio de Padua de Guayama by then Spanish Governor Matías de Abadía, although there is knowledge of it being populated by native people as early as 1567. It was Governor Don Tomás de Abadía who officially declared Guayama a "pueblo" (town) with the name of San Antonio de Padua de Guayama. That same year the Catholic church in town, San Antonio de Padua, was declared a Parish. In 1776, Guayama had 200 houses, the church and a central plaza and the total population was approximately 5,000 villagers. Construction on Guayama's Parroquial church of San Antonio de Padua began in 1827 and was completed 40 years later. In 1828 the construction of the King's House (Casa del Rey) was completed and the church was rebuilt as well.

On April 11, 1832. the Guayama Pueblo was destroyed by fire that burned down 57 houses and 9 huts. The reconstruction of the pueblo followed the rules for all Latin American cities found in the “Compilation of Laws of the Indies,” published in 1680. Streets were laid out in a perfect grid, with straight streets oriented north and south, east and west. The central plaza and the blocks to its east and west are rectangular; almost all the other blocks are square.

Guayama territorial order was altered at different times through the years. Some of the most populated neighborhoods were segregated to form new towns. Patillas was established in 1811 as an independent municipality. In 1831, the territory comprised the neighborhoods: Algarrobos, Ancones, Arroyo, Carreras, Guayama Pueblo, Guamaní, Jobos, Machete, and Yaurel. Later, Arroyo was divided into Arroyo Este and Arroyo Oeste and neighborhoods emerged: Pozo Hondo, Palmas de Aguamanil, Caimital, Pitajayas, Cuatro Calles, Sabana Eneas, Palmas, and Salinas. The latter had been segregated from Coamo.

In 1855, Arroyo was separated to become an independent municipality, taking the neighborhoods: Ancones, Arroyo, Yaurel, Pitajaya, and Cuatro Calles. By 1878, Guayama was a department head including: Comerío (then Sabana del Palmar), Cidra, Cayey, Salinas, Arroyo, San Lorenzo (then called Hato Grande), Aguas Buenas, Caguas, Gurabo, and Juncos. The development continued with the construction of the town cemetery in 1844, the slaughterhouse and meat market in 1851, and a wooden theater of two levels in 1878. By then Guayama had fourteen sugar plantations operating with steam engines and three with ox mills. Also practiced in this municipality was the exploitation of lead mines by the company "La Estrella", owned by Miguel Planellas, as well as the mineral galena, by the company "La Rosita", owned by Antonio Aponte. In 1881, Guayama is declared a Villa (First Order Municipality).

During the Spanish–American War, American forces under General Nelson A. Miles landed at Guánica near Ponce on July 25, 1898. The landing surprised the United States War Department no less than the Spanish, as Miles had been instructed to land near San Juan (the War Department learned of the landing through an Associated Press release.) However, en route to Puerto Rico Miles concluded that a San Juan landing was vulnerable to attack by small boats, and so changed plans. Ponce, said at the time to be the largest city in Puerto Rico, was connected with San Juan by a 110-kilometre (70 mi) military road, well defended by the Spanish at Coamo and Aibonito. In order to flank this position, American Major General John R. Brooke landed at Arroyo, just east of Guayama, intending to move on Cayey, which is northwest of Guayama, along the road from Ponce to San Juan. General Brooke occupied Guayama August 5, 1898, after slight opposition, in the Battle of Guayama. On August 9, the Battle of Guamaní took place north of Guayama. A more significant battle, the Battle of Aibonito Pass, was halted on the morning of August 13 upon notification of the armistice between the United States and Spain.

Puerto Rico was ceded by Spain in the aftermath of the Spanish–American War under the terms of the Treaty of Paris of 1898 and became a territory of the United States. In 1899, the United States Department of War conducted a census of Puerto Rico finding that the population of Guayama was 12,749.

After the Spanish–American War, Guayama continued to develop. The Bernardini Theater built by engineer Manuel Texidor y Alcalá del Olmo opened in 1913. The venue, property of attorney Thomas Bernardini, was the scene for artists of international fame. By that time, Guayama was considered one of the most important cities on the island's social scene.

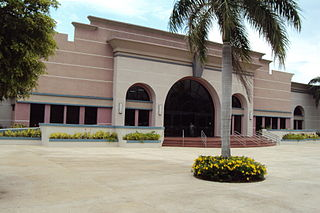
Guayama Convention Center

In the early twentieth century, there were selected societies such as the 'Coliseo Derkes' and 'Grupo Primavera', which endowed performing arts as well as scientific events. By the mid-twentieth century, Guayama achieved great industrial development, especially with the establishment of Univis Optical Corp., Angela Manufacturing Company and a petrochemical complex of the Phillips Petroleum Company. In 1968, the company started production of paraffin, benzene, synthetic fibers, nylon, plastic anhydrous, a 3,800,000 litres (830,000 imp gal; 1,000,000 US gal) of gasoline a day, and many other products. During that same decade agriculture began to decline as a result of land loss, industrialization and the construction of multiple housing developments. The urban growth affected the sugar cane industry. However, in 1974, 155,595 tons of sugar cane was harvested in the Municipality producing 12,655 tons of refined sugar.

In November 2002, AES Puerto Rico opened its coal power plant in Guayama. The company transmits and distributes electricity through a 25-year contract with the Puerto Rico Electric Power Authority. The 2012 National Puerto Rican Day Parade was dedicated to the Municipality of Guayama and its people.

On September 20, 2017 Hurricane Maria struck Puerto Rico. In Guayama, the hurricane triggered numerous landslides and caused major destruction with an estimated 2000 homes losing their roof. The river caused major flooding and people were left with no power. After Hurricane Maria, the people of Guayama resorted to collecting spring water for their drinking water.

== Geography ==
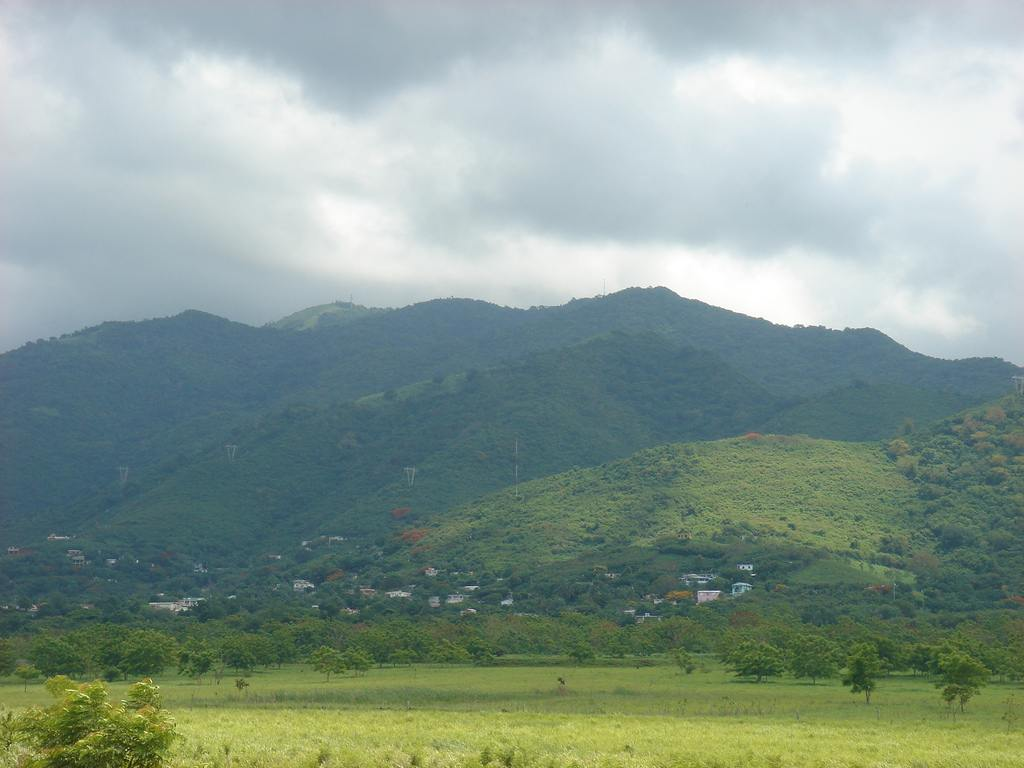
View of Guayama, Cordillera Central and Bosque de Carite.

Guayama is located at 17°58′27″N 66°06′36″W.

The Municipality of Guayama is located on the Southern Coastal Valley region, bordering the Caribbean Sea, south of Cayey; east of Salinas; and west of Patillas and Arroyo. Guayama's municipal territory reaches the central mountain range to the north and the Caribbean Sea to the south. The mountain systems Sierra de Jájome (2,395 feet or 730 meters) and Sierra de Cayey cover some of the municipality area. The highest points are the Cerro de la Tabla (2,834 feet or 863 meters) and Cerro Tumbado (2,450 feet or 746 meters), which are part of the Sierra de Cayey mountain system. Other elevations are the mountains Garau, Charcas and Peña Hendida. Parts of the Guavate-Carite Forest and the Aguirre State Forest are in Guayama. The Guavate-Carite Forest, a 2,400-hectare (6,000-acre) nature reserve is inhabited by 50 species of birds, making this spot a recognized area for birding and has a reserve with a dwarf forest that was produced by the region's high humidity and moist soil. The Aguirre Forest includes: mangroves, tidal flats, bird rookeries, research lakes & large manatee population. The Jobos Bay National Estuarine Research Reserve was established in 1987. The reserve is located between the coasts of Salinas and Guayama, approximately 1,167 hectares (2,883 acres) of mangrove forest and freshwater wetlands. The two main components: Mar Negro mangrove forest, which consists of a mangrove forest and a complex system of lagoons and channels interspersed with salt and mud flats; and Cayos Caribe Islets, which are surrounded by coral reefs and seagrass beds, with small beach deposits and upland areas.

=== Features ===
- Islands include Cayo Caribes, Isla Morrillito and Mata Redonda.
- Carite Dam
- Gorges; Barros, Branderí, Cimarrona, Corazón, Culebra, Palmas Bajas, and Salada.
- Lakes: Melania Lake, Carite Lake
- Las Mareas Lagoon
- Rivers: Río Chiquito, Río Guamaní, Río de la Plata and Río Seco.

=== Climate ===
The annual precipitation is approximately 1,300 millimetres (52 in) and the average temperature is 27 °C (81 °F).

Climate data for Guayama, Puerto Rico (1991–2020 normals, extremes 1914–present)
Month	Jan	Feb	Mar	Apr	May	Jun	Jul	Aug	Sep	Oct	Nov	Dec	Year
Record high °F (°C)	94 (34)	94 (34)	95 (35)	96 (36)	96 (36)	95 (35)	99 (37)	99 (37)	98 (37)	97 (36)	97 (36)	95 (35)	99 (37)
Mean daily maximum °F (°C)	85.4 (29.7)	85.5 (29.7)	85.9 (29.9)	86.9 (30.5)	87.9 (31.1)	88.8 (31.6)	89.7 (32.1)	90.0 (32.2)	90.0 (32.2)	89.3 (31.8)	88.1 (31.2)	86.5 (30.3)	87.8 (31.0)
Daily mean °F (°C)	78.7 (25.9)	78.6 (25.9)	78.9 (26.1)	80.3 (26.8)	81.8 (27.7)	83.0 (28.3)	83.6 (28.7)	83.7 (28.7)	83.4 (28.6)	82.6 (28.1)	81.3 (27.4)	79.8 (26.6)	81.3 (27.4)
Mean daily minimum °F (°C)	71.9 (22.2)	71.7 (22.1)	71.9 (22.2)	73.7 (23.2)	75.7 (24.3)	77.2 (25.1)	77.5 (25.3)	77.4 (25.2)	76.8 (24.9)	76.0 (24.4)	74.6 (23.7)	73.0 (22.8)	74.8 (23.8)
Record low °F (°C)	60 (16)	60 (16)	61 (16)	60 (16)	62 (17)	64 (18)	65 (18)	67 (19)	65 (18)	63 (17)	62 (17)	62 (17)	60 (16)
Average precipitation inches (mm)	2.42 (61)	1.70 (43)	1.90 (48)	2.84 (72)	5.26 (134)	4.58 (116)	5.46 (139)	7.08 (180)	7.30 (185)	7.22 (183)	5.85 (149)	2.79 (71)	54.40 (1,382)
Average precipitation days (≥ 0.01 in)	14.5	13.1	12.0	12.5	15.9	16.6	17.2	18.5	16.0	17.5	16.2	15.1	185.1
Source: NOAA

=== Barrios ===
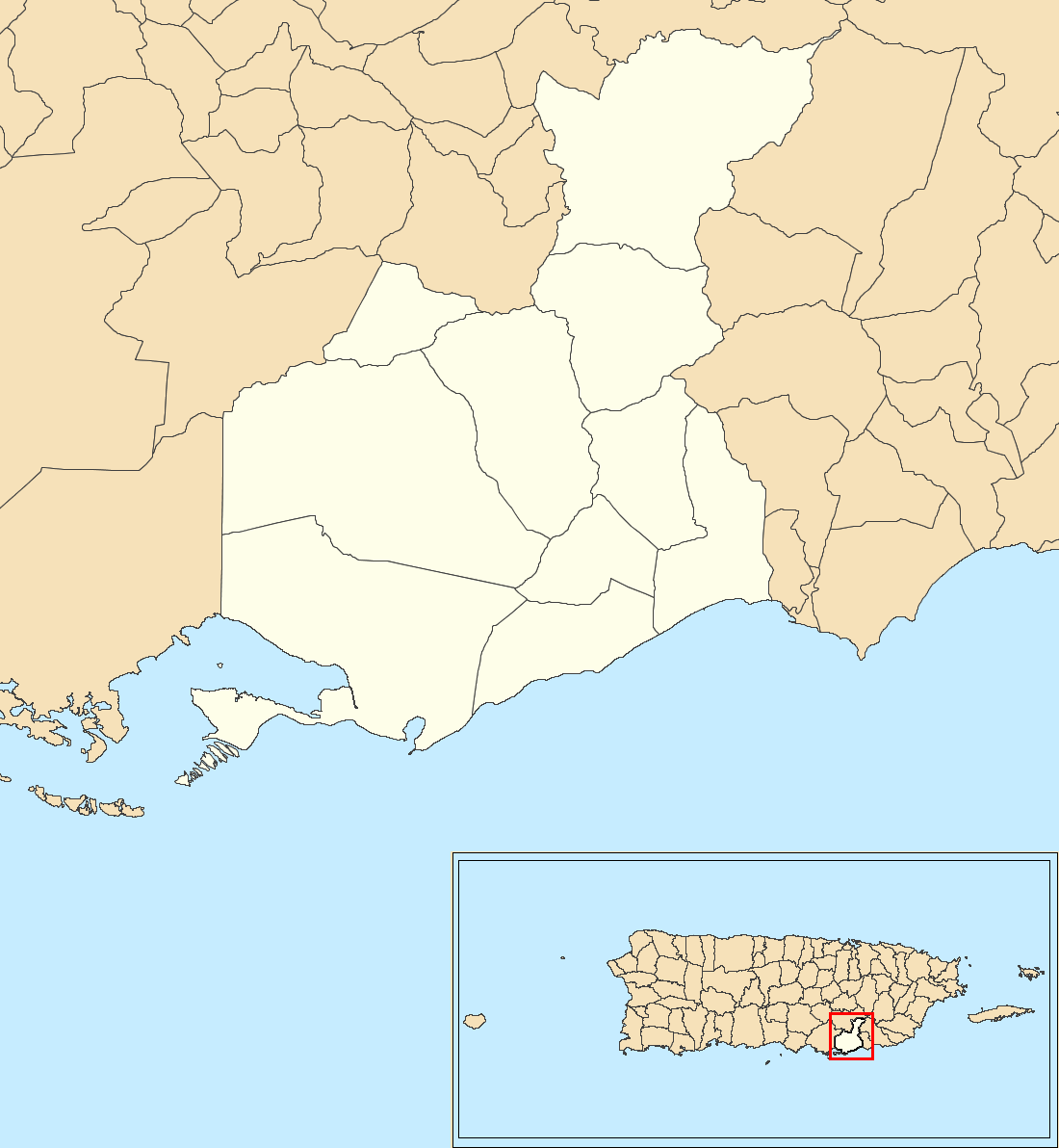
Subdivisions of Guayama.

Like all municipalities of Puerto Rico, Guayama is subdivided into barrios. The municipal buildings, central square and large Catholic church are located in a barrio referred to as "el pueblo".

1. Algarrobo
2. Caimital
3. Carite
4. Carmen
5. Guamaní
6. Guayama barrio-pueblo
7. Jobos
8. Machete
9. Palmas
10. Pozo Hondo

Population, per 2010 census: Algarrobo 6,959; Caimital 4,124; Carite 1,210; Carmen 619; Guamaní 1,455; Guayama Pueblo 16,891; Jobos 8,286; Machete 3,846; Palmas 709; Pozo Hondo 1,263; Total 45,362.

=== Sectors ===
Barrios (which are like minor civil divisions) and subbarrios, are further subdivided into smaller areas called sectores (sectors in English). The types of sectores may vary, from normally sector to urbanización to reparto to barriada to residencial, among others.

=== Special Communities ===
Comunidades Especiales de Puerto Rico (Special Communities of Puerto Rico) are marginalized communities whose citizens are experiencing a certain amount of social exclusion. A map shows these communities occur in nearly every municipality of the Commonwealth. Of the 742 places that were on the list in 2014, the following barrios, communities, sectors, or neighborhoods were in Guayama: Borinquén, Comunidad Mosquito, Comunidad Puerto de Jobos, Loma del Viento, and Pueblito Del Carmen.

== Tourism ==
To stimulate local tourism, the Puerto Rico Tourism Company launched the Voy Turistiendo ("I'm Touring") campaign, with a passport book and website. The Guayama page lists Plaza de Recreo Cristobal Colón, Museo Casa Cuatiño, and Molino de Vives, as places of interest.

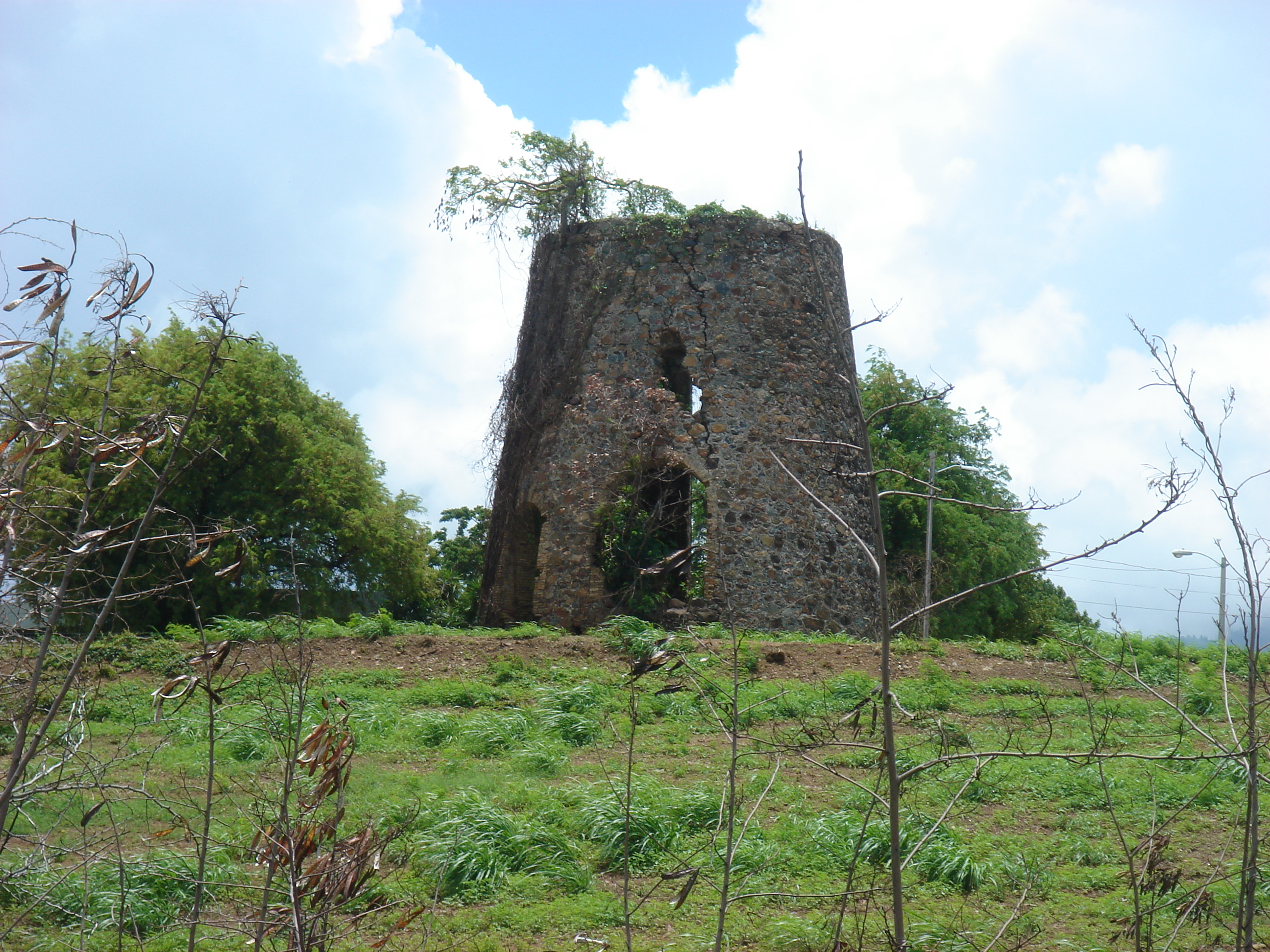
Sugar mill ruins in Guayama

=== Landmarks and places of interest ===
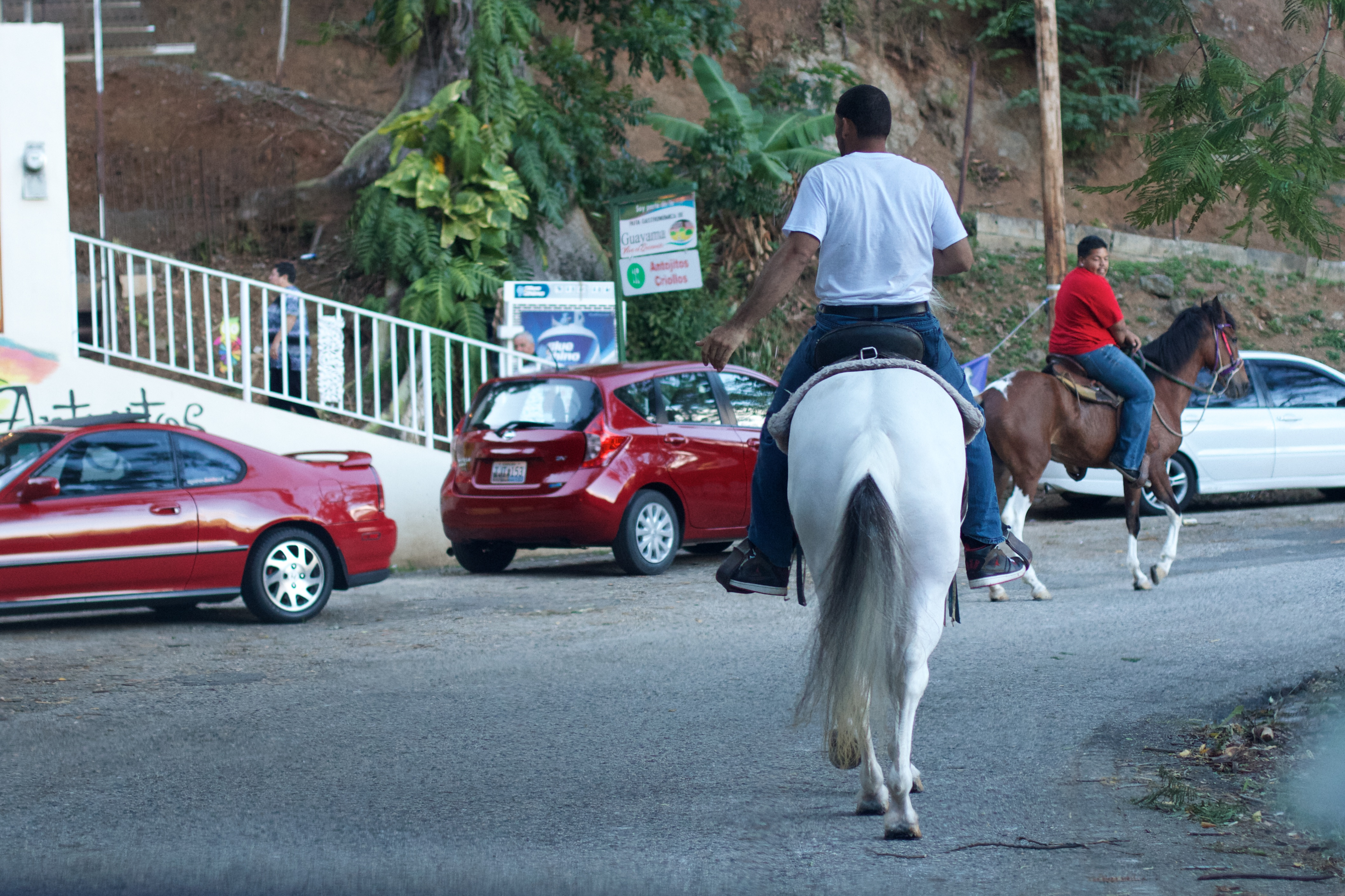
The "gastronomic route" features several restaurants

In 2015, Guayama launched its "grastromic route", with certified restaurants to meet the needs of tourists and locals alike.

According to a news article by Primera Hora, Guayama has 19 beaches including Playa el Bohío.

Other places of interest in Guayama include:

- San Antonio de Padua Church
- Guayama Town Plaza (Plaza pública Cristóbal Colón)
- Molino y Hacienda Azucarera Vives
- Casa Cautiño Museum
- Centro de Bellas Artes
- Teatro Calimano
- First Methodist Church (Built in 1902)
- Guayama Convention Center
- Céntrico Mall
- El Legado Golf Resort
- Mariposario Las Limas Natural Reserve
- Jobos Bay National Estuarine Research Reserve
- Guavate-Carite Forest
- Aguirre State Forest
- Carite Lake
- Pozuelo Beach
- Rodeo Beach
- Fishing Club Guayama

== Economy ==
=== Industry ===
Guayama is home to various pharmaceutical and manufacturing companies, such as Pfizer, Baxter, Eli Lilly, and Tapi. A coal power plant operated by AES.

== Health facilities ==
The Menonita Hospital, located on the Pedro Albizu Campos Avenue is the main medical facility in Guayama. The Veterans Health Administration operates a Community-Based Outpatient Clinic (COBC) in the Municipality.

== Culture ==
Guayama is the birthplace of numerous artists and musicians who have significantly influenced Puerto Rican culture. During the 20th century, the literary culture of the city was influenced by performers including Afro-Antillano genre poet Luis Palés Matos and his father Vicente Palés Anés. Music composer Catalino "Tite" Curet Alonso who became a composer of over 2,000 salsa songs is also from Guayama, even though he was raised in the Santurce section of San Juan. Other performers born in Guayama include actresses Gilda Galán and Karla Monroig. The Casa Cautiño Museum is administered by the Institute of Puerto Rican Culture and include works of art, wood carvings, sculptures and furniture built by Puerto Rican cabinetmakers for the Cautiño family. The museum is listed on the National Register of Historic Places.

=== Festivals and events ===
Guayama celebrates its patron saint festival in June. The Fiestas Patronales de San Antonio de Padua is a religious and cultural celebration that generally features parades, games, artisans, amusement rides, regional food, and live entertainment.

Feria Dulce Sueño named after a famous Puerto Rican horse is held each March in Guayama. Dulce Sueño, the most influential sire in the modern Puerto Rican Paso Fino breed, was born in Guayama.

Other festivals and events celebrated in Guayama include:

- Witches Carnival – March
- Guayama Carnival – April
- Sweet Dreams Fair – March
- Jíbaro Festival – October
- Puerto Rican Week – December

=== Sports ===
Guayama had one of the Professional Baseball League founding teams, which won the Championship the first years of the league, 1938–39 and 1939–40. Guayama has a baseball team (Brujos de Guayama) in the Federación de Béisbol Aficionado de Puerto Rico that won the national championship in 1987. Guayama also used to have a basketball team in the Puerto Rico's BSN (Brujos de Guayama) that went to the League finals twice back in 1991 and 1994 but lost both times to eventual champions Atleticos de San German, it was announced that the team will return for the league's 2012 season. The Guayama Convention Center hosted some of the roller skating events for the 2010 Central American and Caribbean Games that took place in Mayagüez, Puerto Rico from July 18, 2010, to August 1, 2010. El Legado Golf Resort, a 285 acres, 18 hole golf course founded in 2002 by Puerto Rican golf player Juan "Chi-Chi" Rodriguez. The Guayama Football Club, founded in 1949, plays in the Liga Puerto Rico.

== Demographics ==
Historical population
Census	Pop.	Note	%±
1900	12,749		—
1910	17,379		36.3%
1920	19,192		10.4%
1930	23,624		23.1%
1940	30,511		29.2%
1950	32,807		7.5%
1960	33,678		2.7%
1970	36,249		7.6%
1980	40,183		10.9%
1990	41,588		3.5%
2000	44,301		6.5%
2010	45,362		2.4%
2020	36,614		−19.3%
2025 (est.)	34,043	▼	−7.0%
U.S. Decennial Census; 1899 (shown as 1900) 1910-1930; 1930-1950 1960–2000 2010 2020

As of the 2020 U.S. Census, the city had a population of 36,614. It is the center of the Guayama metropolitan area, which was home to 68,442 in 2020.

In terms of race and ethnicity, the 2010 U.S. census stated the following concerning Guayameses:

- White: 72.8% (33,025)
- Black: 22.9% (10,367)
- American Indian/Indigenous: 1.7% (769)
- Asian: 0.2% (108)
- Native Hawaiian/Pacific Islander: 0.1% (51)
- Some Other Race: 8.3.% (3,746)

== Government ==
All municipalities in Puerto Rico are administered by a mayor, elected every four years. The current mayor of Guayama is O'brain Vázquez Molina, of the Popular Democratic Party (PPD). He was first elected at a special election held on May 7, 2022, and then re-elected at the 2024 general elections.

The city belongs to the Puerto Rico Senatorial district VI, which is represented by two Senators. In 2024, Rafael Santos Ortiz and Wilmer Reyes Berríos were elected as District Senators.

== Symbols ==
The municipio has an official flag and coat of arms.

=== Flag ===
The flag of Guayama is made up of three stripes of different colors: black, yellow, and red from top to bottom. The black stands for the enslaved Africans brought to Puerto Rico, many to Guayama. The yellow represents sugar cane industry in Puerto Rico and the significance of Guayama's sugar plantations. The red symbolizes the blood shed by Taíno Indians in their fight against the Spanish/European colonizers. To the left of the top stripe we can see the Old Mill, which today is known as the Molino de Vives.

=== Coat of arms ===
The shield is divided in four parts and in two of them part of a chessboard appears. The chessboard pattern represents the center of the city, which resembles a chessboard. It has two old mill towers. The laurel trees constitute a representation of the beautiful Recreation Plaza very well known for its trimmed trees. The three silver flowers symbolize San Antonio de Padua, patron of Guayama. The crown represents Cacique Guayama, name of the town. The big crown has four towers.

== Education ==
The education system in Guayama has three public high schools, which are Francisco Garcia Boyrie, Adela Brenes Texidor and Dr. Rafael Lopez Landrón, and one vocational high school, Dra. Maria Socorro Lacot. Guayama also has a campus of the Puerto Rico Institute of Technology and the Inter American University of Puerto Rico, Guayama campus (Universidad Interamericana de Puerto Rico, Recinto de Guayama in Spanish) Universidad Interamericana de Puerto Rico – Recinto de Guayama . It also has several private schools such as Academia San Antonio, Guamaní Private School, Saint Patrick's Bilingual School, Colegio Catòlico San Antonio, Fountain Christian Bilingual School, Escuela Superior and Academia Adventista Tres Angeles and more than 12 other public schools in the elementary and intermediate education levels.

== Transportation ==
Guayama is served by multiple state highways, principally Puerto Rico Highway 54, Puerto Rico Highway 53, PR-3, PR-15, PR-179, PR-744, PR-748, and PR-7710. PR-54 serves as a by-pass route to PR-3 which crosses the pueblo. PR-54 also serves as the main route towards PR-53, connecting Guayama to the neighboring town of Salinas and PR-52, providing expressway access towards Ponce, San Juan, and Caguas. Just north of the Guayama barrio-pueblo is PR-748, which, along with the Conector Dulce Sueño forms a ring around Guayama’s urban area. PR-748 intercepts Olimpo and Caimital, eventually intersecting with the rural PR-15, connecting Guayama with Cayey. PR-179 is born out of PR-15, serving as the main route through barrios Guamaní and Carite until its intersection with PR-184 in Cayey. Just south of Guayama’s main urban area, PR-3 continues on its way to Salinas. It crosses through Jobos, right in front of its parish and continues to Salinas. PR-7710 serves as the only route to the coastal sector of Pozuelo, offering some of the best beaches Guayama has to offer. The Municipality is only 38 mi (61 km) away from Ponce and 58 mi (93 km) from San Juan via expressways PR-53 and PR-52. The nearest international airport is the Mercedita Airport in Ponce.

At one time during 1937, Guayama received domestic, commercial airline flights from San Juan on Puerto Rico's national airline, Puertorriqueña de Aviación.

There are 28 bridges in Guayama.

== Notable Guayameses ==
- Manuel Alonso Pizarro - actor and stage director, poet, playwright
- Jose C. Aponte Garcia - Puerto Rico Prosecuting Attorney during the Administrations of Luis Munoz Marin, Roberto Sanchez Vilella; Secretary of Justice during Roberto Sanchez Vilella's Administration
- Modesto Cartagena - Purple Heart recipient
- Catalino (Tite) Curet Alonso - composer of over 2,000 salsa songs.
- Diosa Costello - actress, AKA: The Original Latin Bombshell. True Name: Juana de Dios Castrello
- Luis Palés Matos - Puerto Rican poet who is credited with creating the poetry genre known as Afro-Antillano.
- Gilda Galán - Puerto Rican actress, dramaticist, comedian, writer, composer, scriptwriter and poet.
- Rafael Pérez Perry - Businessman and a pioneer in Puerto Rico's radio and television broadcasting industry. In 1954 founded Puerto Rico's television Channel 11 (nowadays Univision Puerto Rico).
- Miguel Poventud - Puerto Rican musician, singer, actor and composer of Boleros.
- Pedro Garcia - Major League Baseball player for the Milwaukee Brewers, Detroit Tigers, and the Toronto Blue Jays
- Karla Monroig - Telenovela actress, model and television host.
- Roger Moret- Former Major League Baseball pitcher
- Juan Laporte -Former WBC featherweight boxing champion (1982–1984)
- Jaime Fuster Berlingeri- Associate Justice to the Supreme Court of Puerto Rico and former Resident Commissioner to the U.S. Congress.
- Marcos Crespo - Democratic member of the New York State Assembly representing the 85th Assembly District.
- Carmelo Delgado Delgado - Leader of the Puerto Rican Nationalist Party. Is thought to be the first U.S. citizen to die in Spain's civil war.
- Dr.Victor Manuel Blanco PhD - Scientist and astronomer who in 1959 discovered "Blanco 1," a galactic cluster.
- Eddie Rosario - Major League Baseball player for the Atlanta Braves and was the 2021 NLCS MVP.
- Leopoldo Santiago Lavandero (1912-2003) - playwright, theater producer and teacher.
- Plan B - reggaetón duo with multiple songs on the Billboard Hot Latin Songs charts.
- Ricky Sánchez - Former basketball player, drafted by the Portland Trail Blazers in 2005.

== Gallery ==
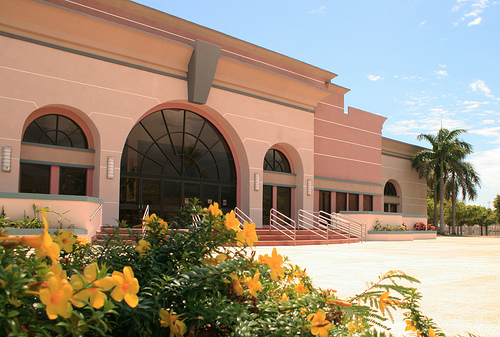
The Guayama Convention Center

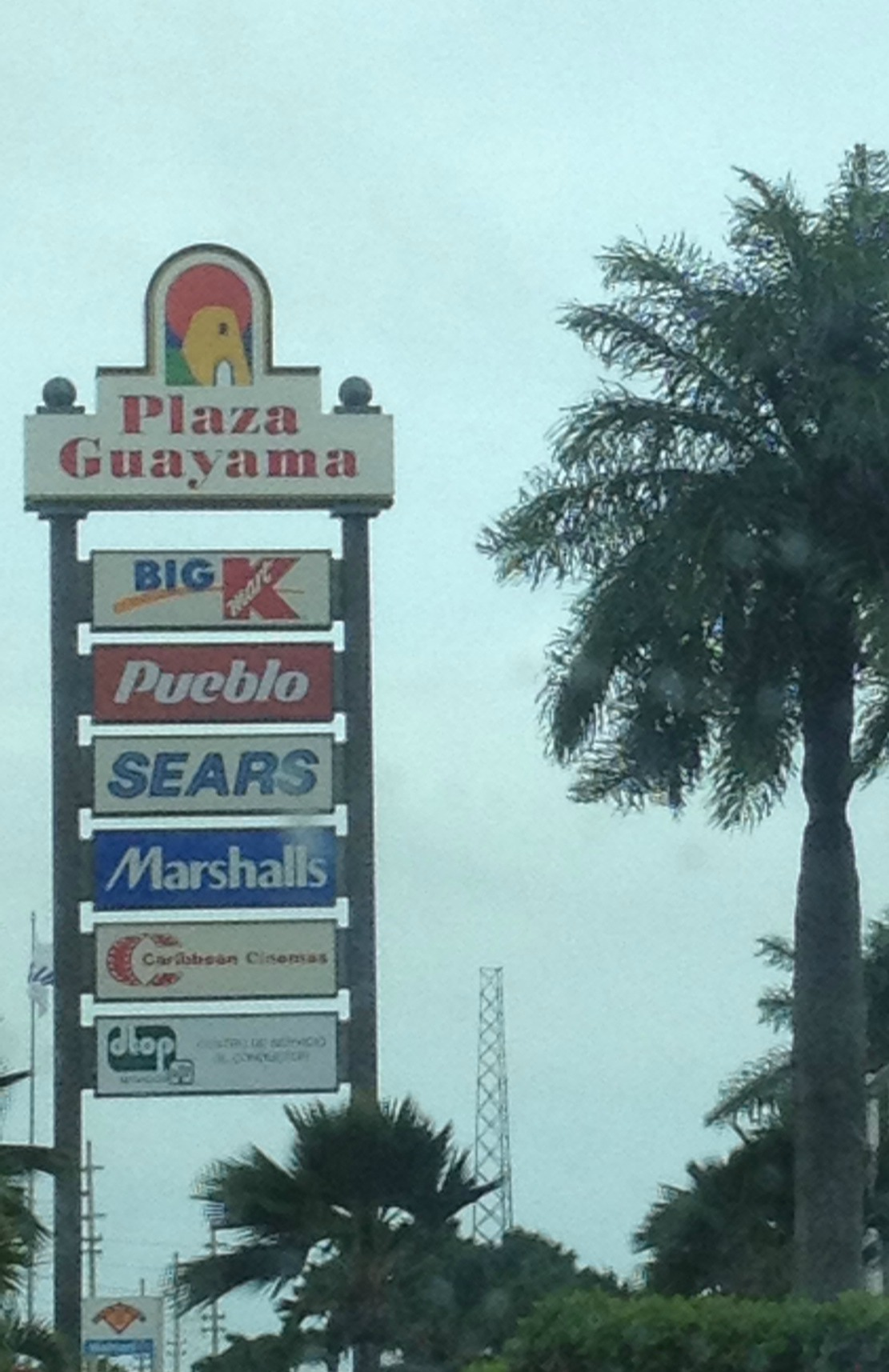
Plaza Guayama Mall

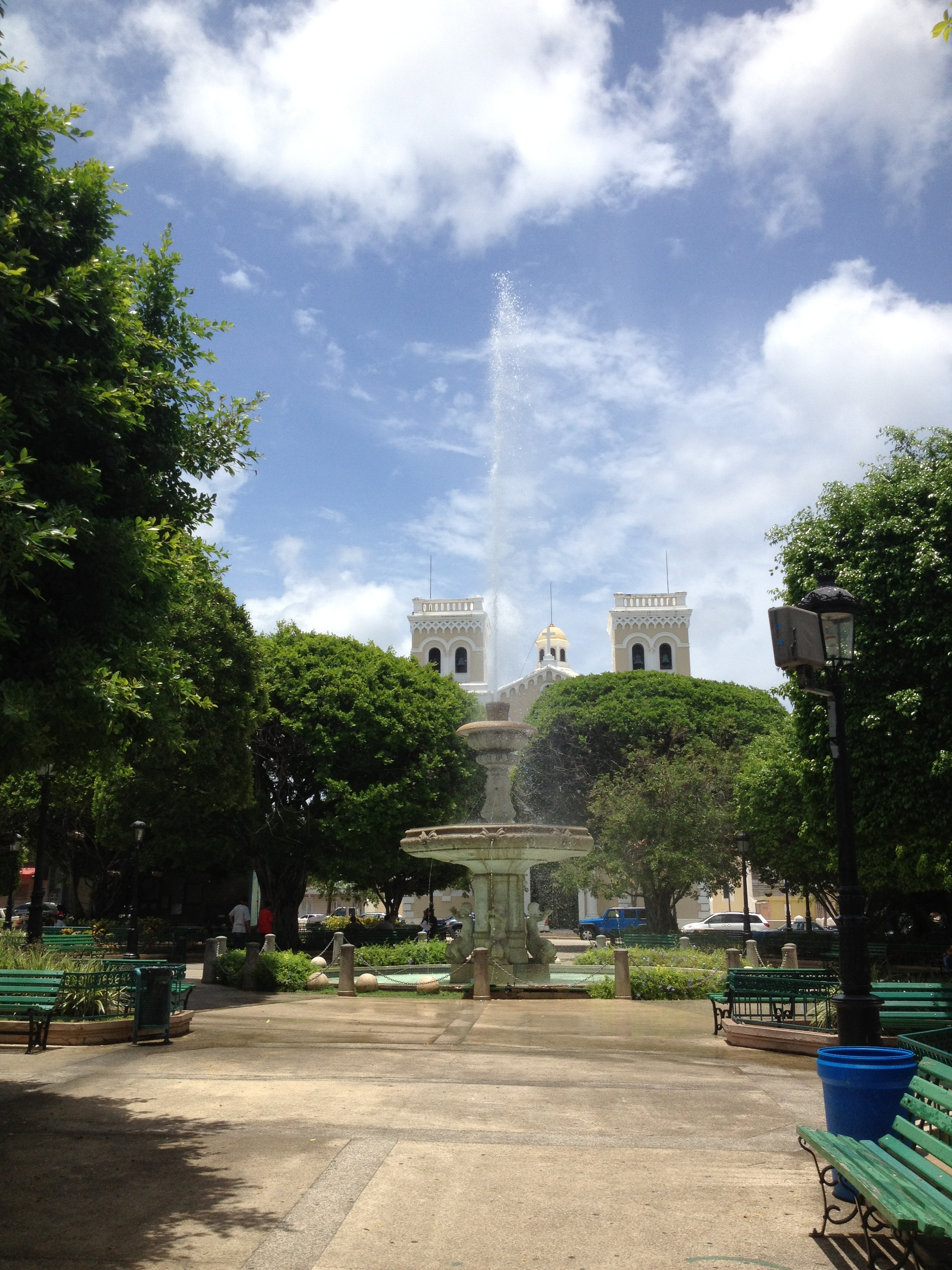
The central plaza and church of San Antonio de Padua in Guayama

== See also ==
- List of Puerto Ricans
- History of Puerto Rico
- Did you know-Puerto Rico?
