= Constitutional Convention of Puerto Rico =

Convention to draft a constitution for Puerto Rico

On June 8, 1950, the United States government approved Public Law 600, authorizing Puerto Rico to draft its own constitution in 1951. The Constitutional Assembly (Spanish: Asamblea Constituyente) or Constitutional Convention of Puerto Rico met for a period of several months between 1951 and 1952 in which the document was written. The framers had to follow only two basic requirements established under Public Law 600. The first was the document must establish a republican form of government for the island. The second was the inclusion of a Bill of Rights.

The Constitution of Puerto Rico renamed the body politic until then known as the "People of Puerto Rico", and henceforth known as the "Commonwealth of Puerto Rico" (Estado Libre Asociado).

== Members of the Constitutional Assembly ==
# (Note: Number in the Session Hall)	Delegate	Party	Constituency	Residence	Committee assignments (Note: While the official designation for the subordinate groups was commission these were in practice committees as they did not entail an external body.)	Cmtes.	Signing order	Notes (Note: Employment at the time of their tenure as Delegates and position in the committee of the whole.)
73	Manuel Acevedo Rosario	PPD	Aguadilla	Camuy	Transitory Provisions and General Affairs	1	32	
79	Juan Alemany Silva	PEP	Guayama	Guayama	Drafting, Style and Enrolling	1	33 (Note: While contemporary news reports do not include his signature, the Session Diary does include. The latter being the official source, it takes prevalence over the former.)	
29	Arcilio Alvarado Alvarado	PPD	San Juan I	San Juan (Santurce)	Bill of Rights Judicial Branch Drafting, Style and Enrolling (Note: Secretary of the commission.) (Note: Alvarado Alvarado was replaced by Font Saldaña on 27 September 1951.)	3	34	
92	Enrique Álvarez Vicente	PSO	Arecibo	Utuado	Accounting and Publications	1	35	
42	Francisco L. Anselmi Rodríguez	PPD	Ponce	Coamo	Legislative Branch Transitory Provisions and General Affairs	2	26	
37	Francisco A. Arrillaga Gaztambide	PPD	San Juan I	San Juan (Hato Rey)	Accounting and Publications	1	36	
74	Carmelo Ávila Medina	PPD	Humacao	Naguabo	Transitory Provisions and General Affairs	1	37	
77	José Bartolo Barceló Oliver	PPD	Ponce	Adjuntas	Transitory Provisions and General Affairs	1	38	Mayor of Adjuntas (1944,1948,1957-1968)
39	Ramón Barreto Pérez	PPD	San Juan I	San Juan (Hato Rey)	Legislative Branch	1	39	
32	Ramón Barrios Sánchez	PSO	At-large	Bayamón	Rules and Bylaws Scheduling	1	40	
28	Jaime Benítez Rexach	PPD	At-large	San Juan (Río Piedras)	Bill of Rights (Note: President of the commission.) Drafting, Style and Enrolling	2	10	
55	Francisco Berio Suárez	PPD	Guayama	Comerío	Scheduling	1	41	
59	Virgilio Brunet Maldonado	PPD	At-large	San Juan (Hato Rey)	Preamble, Amendment and Ordinance Procedures Bill of Rights	2	42	
53	Agustín Burgos Rivera	PPD	Ponce	Villalba	Accounting and Publications	1	43	
41	Mario Canales Torresola	PPD	Ponce	Jayuya	Legislative Branch	1	44	Former-mayor of Jayuya
61	Ángel M. Candelario Arce	PPD	Mayagüez	Peñuelas	Judicial Branch	1	45	
01	Ernesto Carrasquillo Quiñones	PPD	Humacao	Yabucoa	Bill of Rights (Note: Vice President of the Commission.)	1	19	Former-mayor of Yabucao
17	Dionisio Casillas Casillas	PPD	Humacao	Humacao	Accounting and Publications	1	46	
68	José A. Cintrón Rivera	PPD	At-large	San Juan (Santurce)	Bill of Rights	1	47	
25	Luis Alfredo Colón Velázquez	PPD	Aguadilla	Moca	Preamble, Amendment and Ordinance Procedures Rules and Bylaws Executive Branch (Note: Colón Velázquez was replaced by Solá Morales on 27 September 1951.)	3	30	
89	Ramiro L. Colón Castaño	PEP	Ponce	Ponce	Preamble, Amendment and Ordinance Procedures	1	— (Note: While contemporary news reports included his signature, the Session Diary reflects his decision not to sign the document by correctly omitting his name. His last recorded attendance to the Convention was on the fifty-fourth day (24 January 1952).)	Only delegate not to sign the Constitution. (Note: Colón Castaño was opposed to signing the Constitution since it did not solve the political status of Puerto Rico, claiming that "if the United States Congress had the power to allow us to pass a constitution, it also had the power to take it away from us.") Then-general manager of the Cooperative of Coffee Growers of Puerto Rico.
04	Juan Dávila Díaz	PPD	Arecibo	Manatí	Accounting and Publications	1	31	
51	José M. Dávila Monsanto	PPD	Guayama	Guayama	Judicial Branch	1	25	
58	Lionel Fernández Méndez	PPD	Guayama	Cayey	Rules and Bylaws Drafting, Style and Enrolling	2	48	
— (Note: President of the Convention)	Antonio Fernós Isern	PPD	At-large	San Juan (Santurce)	—	0	01	Then-Resident Commissioner of Puerto Rico
30	Luis A. Ferré Aguayo	PEP	Ponce	Ponce	Preamble, Amendment and Ordinance Procedures Transitory Provisions and General Affairs	2	49	
75	Alcides Figueroa Oliva	PPD	Aguadilla	Añasco	Transitory Provisions and General Affairs	1	50	
13	Leopoldo Figueroa Carreras	PEP	At-large	Cataño	Scheduling Bill of Rights	2	51	
18	Ernesto Juan Fonfrías Rivera	PPD	San Juan II	Toa Baja (Carr. 2 K-19)	Preamble, Amendment and Ordinance Procedures Judicial Branch	2	52	
23	Jorge Font Saldaña	PPD	At-large	San Juan (Santurce)	Preamble, Amendment and Ordinance Procedures Drafting, Style and Enrolling	2	24	
78	Juan R. García Delgado	PEP	Aguadilla	Hatillo	Rules and Bylaws Accounting and Publications (Note: Iriarte Miró was replaced by García Delgado on 27 September 1951.)	2	53	
12	Miguel Ángel García Méndez	PEP	Mayagüez	Mayagüez	Scheduling Judicial Branch	2	54	
34	Genaro Antonio Gautier Dapena	PPD	San Juan I	Caguas (La Muda)	Preamble, Amendment and Ordinance Procedures	1	55	Then-first spouse of San Juan
38	Rubén Gaztambide Arrillaga	PPD	San Juan I	San Juan (Río Piedras)	Bill of Rights Legislative Branch	2	18	
90	Fernando José Géigel Sabat	PEP	San Juan I	San Juan (Santurce)	Legislative Branch	1	56	
62	José Rosario Gelpí Bosch	PEP	Mayagüez	Mayagüez	Rules and Bylaws Executive Branch	2	57	
35	Darío Goitía Montalvo	PPD	Arecibo	Arecibo	Executive Branch	1	58	
10	María Libertad Gómez Garriga	PPD	At-large	Utuado	Drafting, Style and Enrolling	1	02	Only female member.
46	Héctor González Blanes	PEP	San Juan I	San Juan (Santurce)	Preamble, Amendment and Ordinance Procedures Bill of Rights	2	59	
02	Andrés Grillasca Salas	PPD	Ponce	Ponce	Transitory Provisions and General Affairs	1	60	Then-mayor of Ponce
26	Víctor Gutiérrez Franqui	PPD	At-large	San Juan (Santurce)	Judicial Branch Drafting, Style and Enrolling	2	03	
14	Celestino Iriarte Miró	PEP	At-large	Cataño (Carr. Cataño)	Accounting and Publications Legislative Branch Judicial Branch	3	05	
69	Jesús Izcoa Moure	PPD	San Juan II	Naranjito	Drafting, Style and Enrolling	1	61	
21	Lorenzo Lagarde Garcés	PPD	Ponce	Ponce	Judicial Branch	1	62	
91	Ramón Llobet Díaz, Jr.	PEP	San Juan II	Guaynabo	Transitory Provisions and General Affairs	1	63	
80	Ramiro Martínez Sandín	PSO	Arecibo	Vega Baja	Preamble, Amendment and Ordinance Procedures Transitory Provisions and General Affairs	2	64	
43	Juan Meléndez Báez	PPD	San Juan I	San Juan	Bill of Rights	1	65	
60	Ramón Mellado Parsons	PPD	San Juan II	San Juan (Río Piedras)	Preamble, Amendment and Ordinance Procedures	1	66	
56	Bernardo Méndez Jiménez	PPD	Aguadilla	San Sebastián	Bill of Rights	1	27	
72	Armando Mignucci Calder	PPD	Mayagüez	Yauco	Scheduling	1	67	
22	José Mimoso Raspaldo	PPD	Guayama	Caguas	Rules and Bylaws	1	22	
45	Pablo Morales Otero	PPD	San Juan II	San Juan (Santurce)	Executive Branch	1	68	
09	Luis Muñoz Marín	PPD	At-large	San Juan	Preamble, Amendment and Ordinance Procedures	1	04	Then-Governor of Puerto Rico
81	Luis Muñoz Rivera	PPD	San Juan I	San Juan (Hato Rey)	Accounting and Publications	1	69	
76	Eduardo Negrón Benítez	PPD	Aguadilla	San Sebastián	Rules and Bylaws	1	70	
07	Luis A. Negrón López	PPD	Mayagüez	Sabana Grande	Legislative Branch Executive Branch	2	09	
84	Abraham Nieves Negrón	PPD	Guayama	Guayama	Accounting and Publications	1	71	
48	Mario Orsini Martínez	PSO	Humacao	Juncos	Judicial Branch Drafting, Style and Enrolling	2	72	
06	Benjamín Ortiz Ortiz	PPD	At-large	Guaynabo	Scheduling Drafting, Style and Enrolling	2	12	
24	Cruz Ortiz Stella	PPD	Humacao	Humacao	Rules and Bylaws Bill of Rights	1	13	
15	Lino Padrón Rivera	PSO	At-large	Vega Baja	Bill of Rights Legislative Branch Judicial Branch	3	06	
03	Santiago R. Palmer Díaz	PPD	Mayagüez	San Germán	Accounting and Publications	1	14	
47	Norman E. Parkhurst	PEP	San Juan II	Bayamón	Accounting and Publications	1	73	
86	Francisco Paz Granela	PPD	At-large	San Juan (Santurce)	Bill of Rights	1	74	
20	Santiago Polanco Abreu	PPD	Arecibo	Isabela	Judicial Branch Transitory Provisions and General Affairs	2	20	
11	Samuel R. Quiñones Quiñones	PPD	At-large	Carolina (Carr. Isla Verde)	Executive Branch Drafting, Style and Enrolling	2	07	President, Senate
49	Ubaldino Ramírez de Arellano	PPD	Mayagüez	San Germán	Legislative Branch	1	75	
08	Ernesto Ramos Antonini	PPD	At-large	San Juan (Hato Rey)	Preamble, Amendment and Ordinance Procedures Judicial Branch	2	08	President, House of Representatives
88	Ramón María Ramos de Jesús	PEP	Guayama	Aibonito	Drafting, Style and Enrolling	1	76	
16	Antonio Reyes Delgado	PSO	At-large	Arecibo	Preamble, Amendment and Ordinance Procedures Bill of Rights Executive Branch	3	77	
85	Dolores Rivera Candelaria	PPD	Arecibo	Utuado	Transitory Provisions and General Affairs	1	78	Then-mayor of Utuado
44	Heraclio H. Rivera Colón	PPD	San Juan II	Toa Alta	Scheduling Legislative Branch	2	21	
64	Alejo Rivera Morales	PSO	Humacao	Ceiba	Transitory Provisions and General Affairs	1	79	
33	Álvaro Rivera Reyes	PPD	Humacao	Río Grande	Bill of Rights Executive Branch	2	16	
71	Carmelo Rodríguez García	PPD	Arecibo	Arecibo	Executive Branch	1	80	
70	Carlos Román Benítez	PPD	San Juan II	San Juan (Santurce)	Preamble, Amendment and Ordinance Procedures Scheduling	2	81	
36	Alfonso Román García	PPD	Humacao	Fajardo	Accounting and Publications	1	23	
50	Joaquín Rosa Gómez	PPD	Arecibo	Manatí	Rules and Bylaws	1	82	Then-mayor of Manatí (1945-1952, 1961-1968) Senator at-large (1953-1956)
54	Alberto E. Sánchez Nazario	PPD	At-large	San Juan (Santurce)	Bill of Rights	1	83	
83	Ángel Sandín Martínez	PPD	Arecibo	Vega Baja	Transitory Provisions and General Affairs	1	28	Then-mayor of Vega Baja
52	Luis Santaliz Capestany	PPD	Aguadilla	Las Marías	Rules and Bylaws	1	84 (Note: While contemporary news reports places Santaliz Capestany after Soto González, the Session Diary has them in alphabetical order. The latter being the official source, it takes prevalence over the former.)	
05	Yldefonso Solá Morales	PPD	Guayama	Caguas	Executive Branch Transitory Provisions and General Affairs	2	11	
31	Juan Bautista Soto González	PEP	At-large	Gurabo	Bill of Rights Judicial Branch	2	85	
67	Rafael Torrech Genovés	PPD	San Juan II	Bayamón	Executive Branch	1	86	Mayor of Bayamón
40	Lucas Torres Santos	PPD	Ponce	Orocovis	Scheduling	1	87	Former-mayor of Orocovis
82	Pedro Torres Díaz	PPD	Humacao	Gurabo	Scheduling	1	88	
27	José Trías Monge	PPD	At-large	Guaynabo	Preamble, Amendment and Ordinance Procedures Judicial Branch	2	15	
65	Augusto Valentín Vizcarrondo	PPD	Mayagüez	Mayagüez	Legislative Branch	1	89	
66	Baudilio Vega Berríos	PPD	Mayagüez	Mayagüez	Rules and Bylaws	1	90	Then-mayor of Mayagüez
19	Sigfredo Vélez González	PPD	Arecibo	Arecibo	Scheduling	1	29	Former-mayor of Arecibo
63	José Veray, Jr. Hernández	PEP	Aguadilla	Aguadilla	Executive Branch Transitory Provisions and General Affairs	2	91	
87	José Villares Rodríguez	PPD	Guayama	Caguas	Judicial Branch	1	17	

== Committees ==
Ten permanent committees and their officers and members were designated by the body's president, Antonio Fernós Isern, during the 25 September 1951 session, which was followed by the naming of additional delegates and several substations on 27 September. All presidents, vice presidents and secretaries were from the PPD. These committees were grouped by their purposes as follows:

Functions committees (3):

- Rules and Bylaw
- Accounting and Publications
- Scheduling

Constitutional committees (7):

- Preamble, Amendment and Ordinance Procedures
- Bill of Rights
- Legislative Branch
- Executive Branch
- Judicial Branch
- Transitory Provisions and General Affairs
- Drafting, Style and Enrolling

Committee	Membership	President	Vice President	Secretary	Members (Note: El Mundo erroneously names José Veray, Jr. Hernández and Antonio Reyes Delgado, as it repeats the Executive branch list under the Judicial and then states the correct Judicial list. The Session Diary names Miguel Angel García Méndez and Mario Orsini Martínez.)
Preamble, Amendment and Ordinance Procedures (Note: Spanish: Preámbulo, Procedimientos de Enmiendas y Procedimientos)	15	Luis Muñoz Marín	José Trías Monge	Jorge Font Saldaña	Virgilio Brunet Maldonado; Ramiro L. Colón Castaño; Luis Alfredo Colón Velázquez (Note: Named on 27 September.); Luis A. Ferré Aguayo; Ernesto Juan Fonfrías Rivera; Genaro Antonio Gautier Dapena; Héctor González Blanes; Ramiro Martínez Sandín; Ramón Mellado Parsons; Ernesto Ramos Antonini; Antonio Reyes Delgado; Carlos Román Benítez
Rules and Bylaws (Note: Spanish: Reglas y Reglamentos)	11	Cruz Ortiz Stella	José Mimoso Raspaldo	Luis Alfredo Colón Velázquez	Ramón Barrios Sánchez; Lionel Fernández Méndez; Juan R. García Delgado; José Rosario Gelpí Bosch; Eduardo Negrón Benítez; Joaquín Rosa Gómez; Luis Santaliz Capestany; Baudilio Vega Berríos
Accounting and Publications (Note: Spanish: Contabilidad y Publicaciones)	11 (12)	Santiago R. Palmer Díaz	Alfonso Román García	Juan Dávila Díaz	Enrique Álvarez Vicente; Francisco A. Arrillaga Gaztambide; Agustín Burgos Rivera; Dionisio Casillas Casillas; Juan R. García Delgado; Celestino Iriarte Miró; Luis Muñoz Rivera; Abraham Nieves Negrón; Norman E. Parkhurst
Scheduling (Note: Spanish: Agenda)	11	Benjamín Ortiz Ortiz	Heraclio H. Rivera Colón	Sigfredo Vélez González	Francisco Berio Suárez; Ramón Barrios Sánchez; Leopoldo Figueroa Carreras; Miguel Ángel García Méndez; Armando Mignucci Calder; Carlos Román Benítez; Pedro Torres Díaz; Lucas Torres Santos
Bill of Rights (Note: Spanish: Carta de Derechos)	17	Jaime Benítez Rexach	Ernesto Carrasquillo Quiñones	Bernardo Méndez Jiménez	Arcilio Alvarado Alvarado; Virgilio Brunet Maldonado; José A. Cintrón Rivera; Leopoldo Figueroa Carreras; Rubén Gaztambide Arrillaga; Héctor González Blanes; Juan Meléndez Báez; Cruz Ortiz Stella; Lino Padrón Rivera; Francisco Paz Granela; Antonio Reyes Delgado; Álvaro Rivera Reyes; Alberto E. Sánchez Nazario; Juan Bautista Soto González
Legislative Branch (Note: Spanish: Rama Legislativa)	11	Luis A. Negrón López	Rubén Gaztambide Arrillaga	Francisco L. Anselmi Rodríguez	Ramón Barreto Pérez; Mario Canales Torresola; Fernando José Géigel Sabat; Celestino Iriarte Miró; Lino Padrón Rivera; Ubaldino Ramírez de Arellano; Heraclio H. Rivera Colón; Augusto Valentín Vizcarrondo
Executive Branch (Note: Spanish: Rama Ejecutiva)	11 (12)	Samuel R. Quiñones Quiñones	Álvaro Rivera Reyes	Luis A. Negrón López	Luis Alfredo Colón Velázquez; José Rosario Gelpí Bosch; Darío Goitía Montalvo; Pablo Morales Otero; Antonio Reyes Delgado; Carmelo Rodríguez García; Yldefonso Solá Morales; Rafael Torrech Genovés; José Veray, Jr. Hernández
Judicial Branch	15	Ernesto Ramos Antonini	José Villares Rodríguez	José M. Dávila Monsanto	Arcilio Alvarado Alvarado; Ángel M. Candelario Arce; Ernesto Juan Fonfrías Rivera; Miguel Ángel García Méndez; Víctor Gutiérrez Franqui; Celestino Iriarte Miró; Lorenzo Lagarde Garcés; Mario Orsini Martínez; Lino Padrón Rivera; Santiago Polanco Abreu; Juan Bautista Soto González; José Trías Monge
Transitory Provisions and General Affairs (Note: Spanish: Disposiciones Transitorias y Asuntos Generales)	15	Yldefonso Solá Morales	Santiago Polanco Abreu	Ángel Sandín Martínez	Manuel Acevedo Rosario; Francisco L. Anselmi Rodríguez; Carmelo Ávila Medina; José Bartolo Barceló Oliver; Luis A. Ferré Aguayo; Alcides Figueroa Oliva; Andrés Grillasca Salas; Ramón Llobet Díaz, Jr.; Ramiro Martínez Sandín; Dolores Rivera Candelaria; Alejo Rivera Morales; José Veray, Jr. Hernández
Drafting, Style and Enrolling (Note: Spanish: Redacción, Estilo y Enrolado)	11 (12)	Víctor Gutiérrez Franqui	María Libertad Gómez Garriga	Arcilio Alvarado Alvarado; Jorge Font Saldaña	Juan Alemañy Silva; Jaime Benítez Rexach; Lionel Fernández Méndez; Jesús Izcoa Moure; Mario Orsini Martínez; Benjamín Ortiz Ortiz; Samuel R. Quiñones Quiñones; Ramón María Ramos de Jesús
