= Puerto Rico Highway 744 =

Highway in Puerto Rico

Highway 744
- Ruta 744
- Carretera Machete

Route information
- Maintained by Puerto Rico DTPW
- Length: 2.7 km (1.7 mi)

Major junctions
- South end: Sector Central Machete in Machete
- PR-54 in Guayama barrio-pueblo
- North end: PR-3 in Guayama barrio-pueblo

Location
- Country: United States
- Territory: Puerto Rico
- Municipalities: Guayama

Highway system
- Roads in Puerto Rico; List
← PR-742	→ PR-760

Puerto Rico Highway 744 (PR-744) is a north–south road located entirely in the municipality of Guayama, Puerto Rico. With a length of 2.7 kilometers (1.7 mi), it begins at its intersection with PR-3 in downtown Guayama and ends at Sector Central Machete in Machete barrio.

== Major intersections ==
The entire route is located in Guayama.

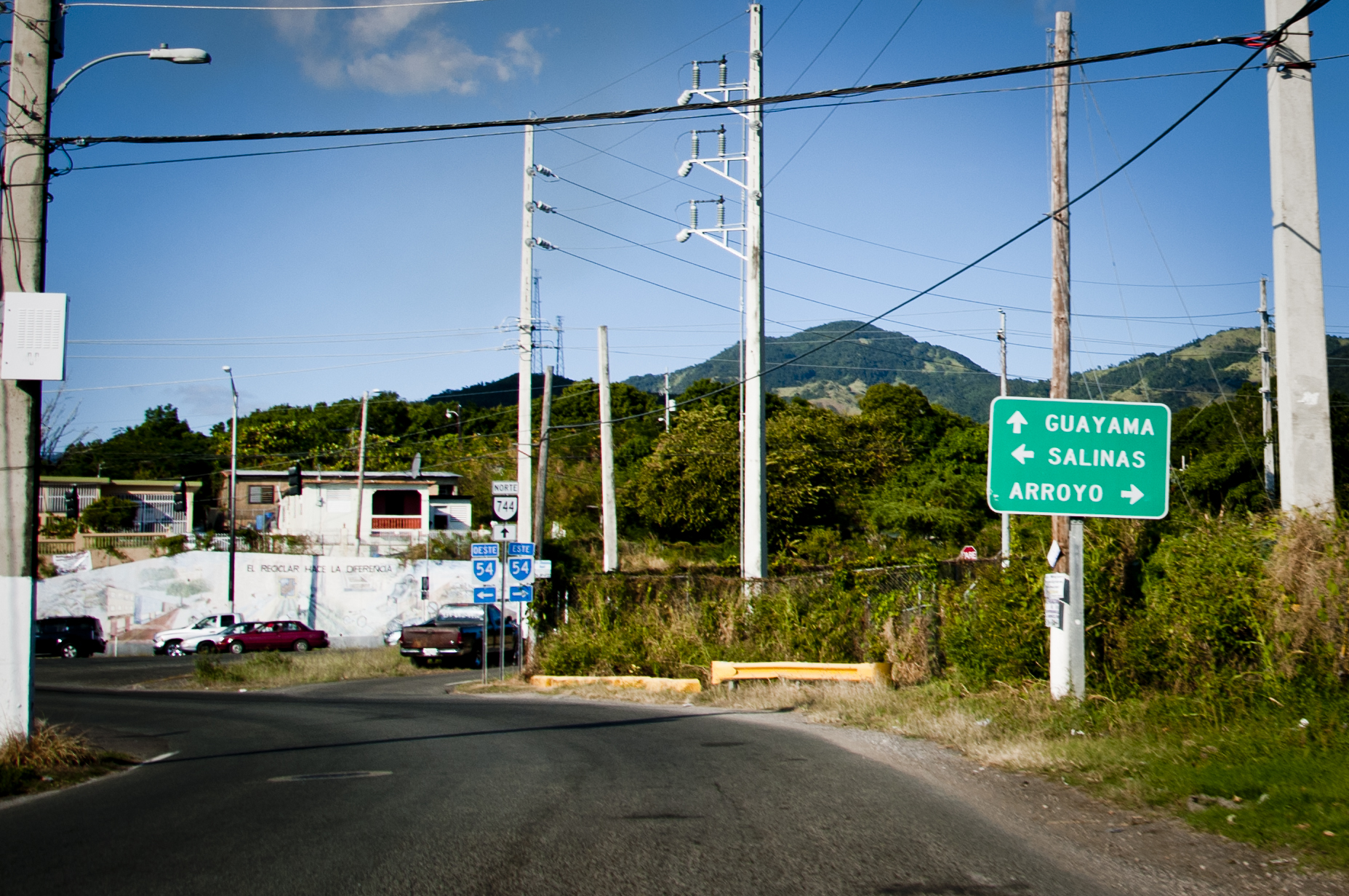
PR-744 approaching PR-54 junction

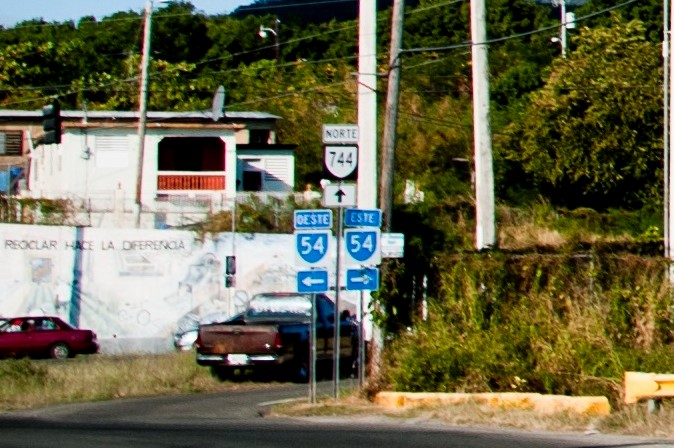
PR-744 at its junction with PR-54

Location	km	mi	Destinations	Notes
Machete	2.7	1.7	Southern terminus of PR-744 at Sector Central Machete	
Guayama barrio-pueblo	0.6	0.37	PR-54 – Salinas, Arroyo, Humacao	Avenida Pedro Albizu Campos
Guayama barrio-pueblo	0.0	0.0	PR-3	Northern terminus of PR-744; access to Guayama Centro, Salinas and Arroyo
1.000 mi = 1.609 km; 1.000 km = 0.621 mi
