= Puerto Rico Highway 54 =

Highway in Puerto Rico

Highway 54
- Ruta 54
- Avenida Pedro Albizu Campos
- PR-54 highlighted in red

Route information
- Maintained by Puerto Rico DTPW
- Length: 6.20 km (3.85 mi)

Major junctions
- West end: PR-53 in Palmas
- PR-7711 in Pozo Hondo; PR-3 in Guayama barrio-pueblo; PR-744 in Guayama barrio-pueblo; PR-748 in Algarrobo
- East end: PR-3 / PR-748 in Algarrobo

Location
- Country: United States
- Territory: Puerto Rico
- Municipalities: Guayama

Highway system
- Roads in Puerto Rico; List
← PR-53	→ PR-60

Puerto Rico Highway 54 (PR-54) is a short divided highway located in Guayama, Puerto Rico and is mainly a by-pass route from Puerto Rico Highway 3 out of Downtown Guayama to Puerto Rico Highway 53. The government of Puerto Rico named the stretch of highway that extends from PR-54, in Guayama, to PR-52, in Salinas Autopista José M. Dávila Monsanto in honor of the late Puerto Rican political leader José M. Dávila Monsanto.

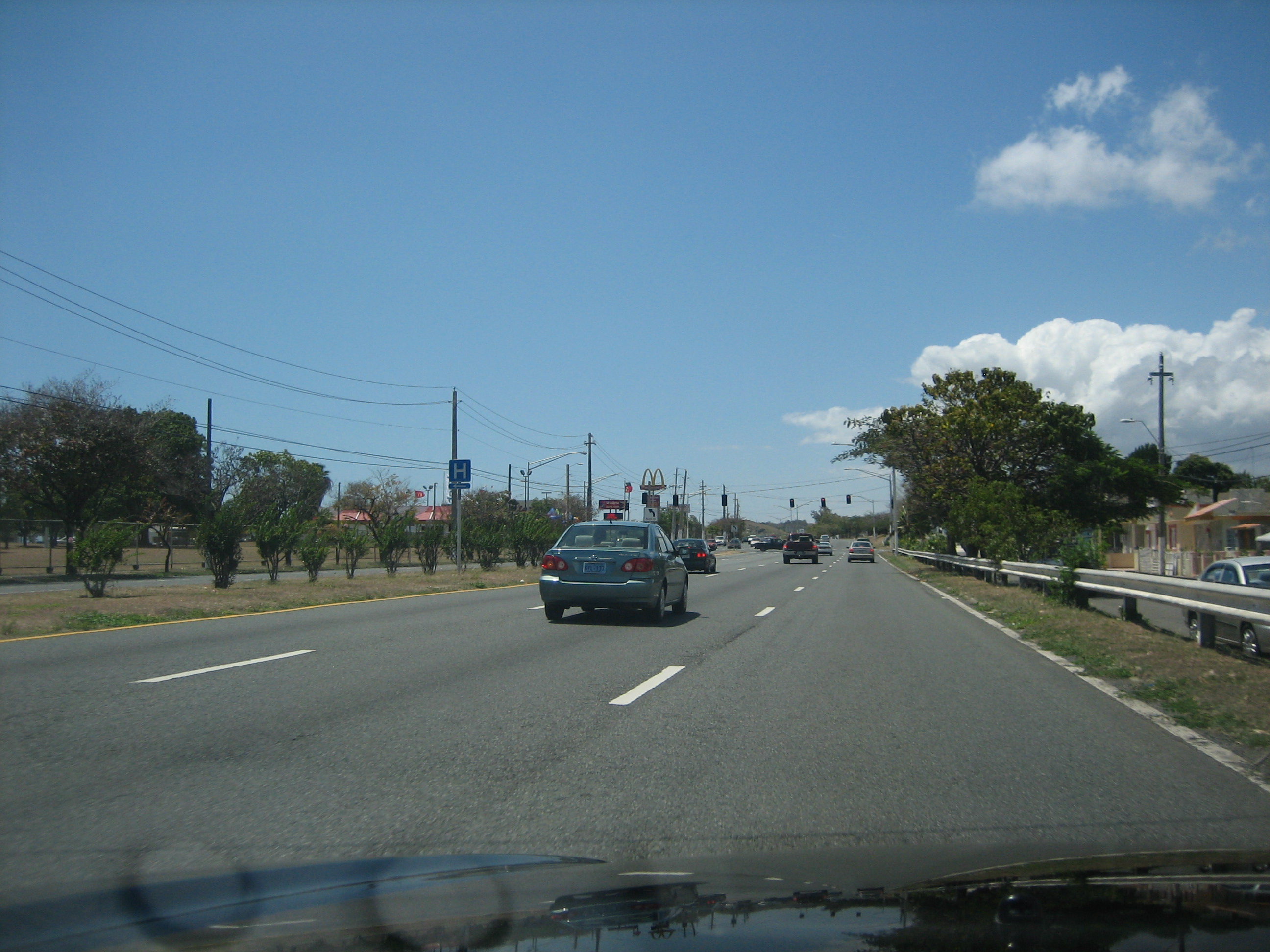
PR-54 allows people to access PR-3 from PR-53 without having to enter downtown Guayama

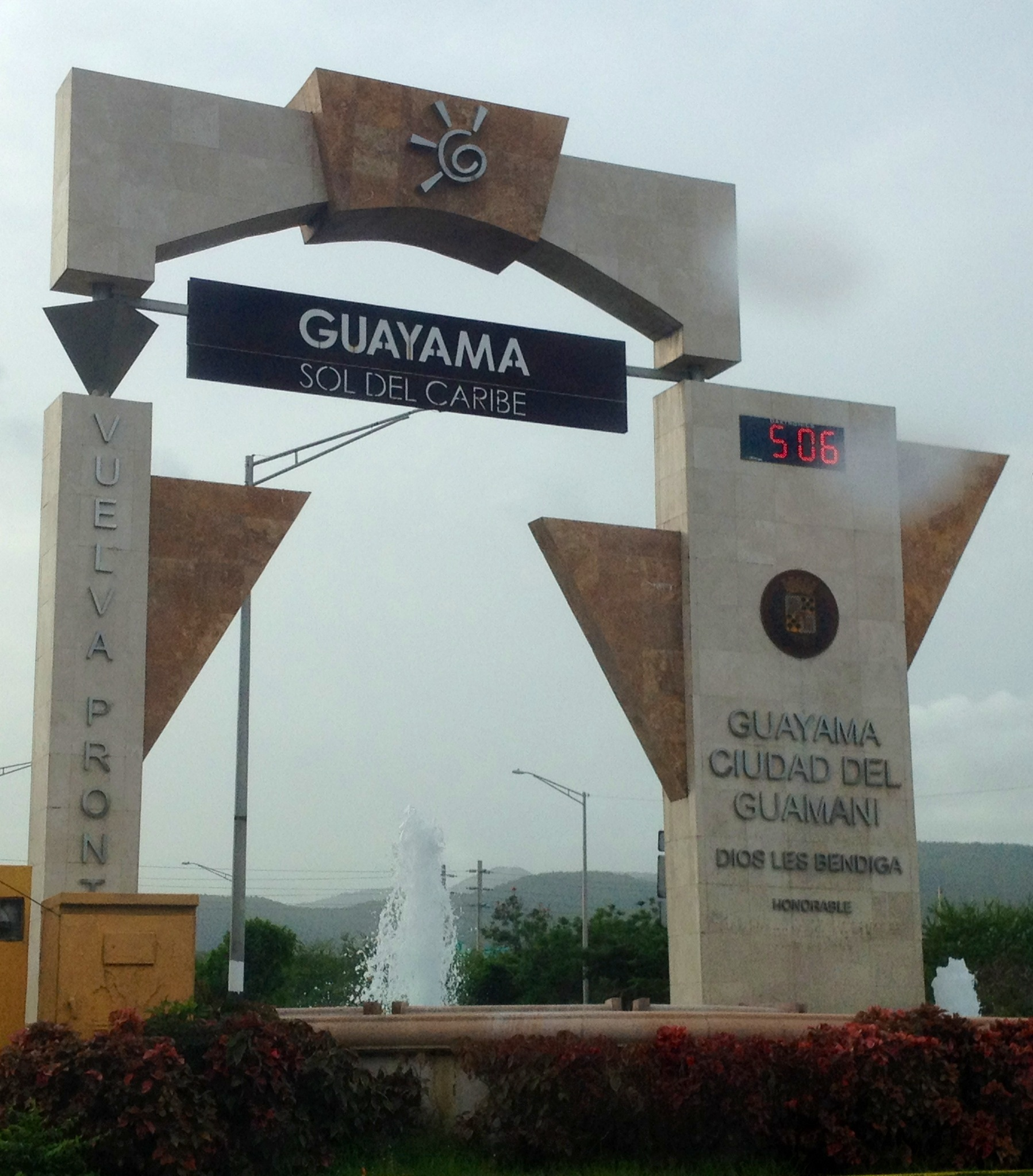
Guayama welcome sign from Highway 54

== Major intersections ==
The entire route is located in Guayama.

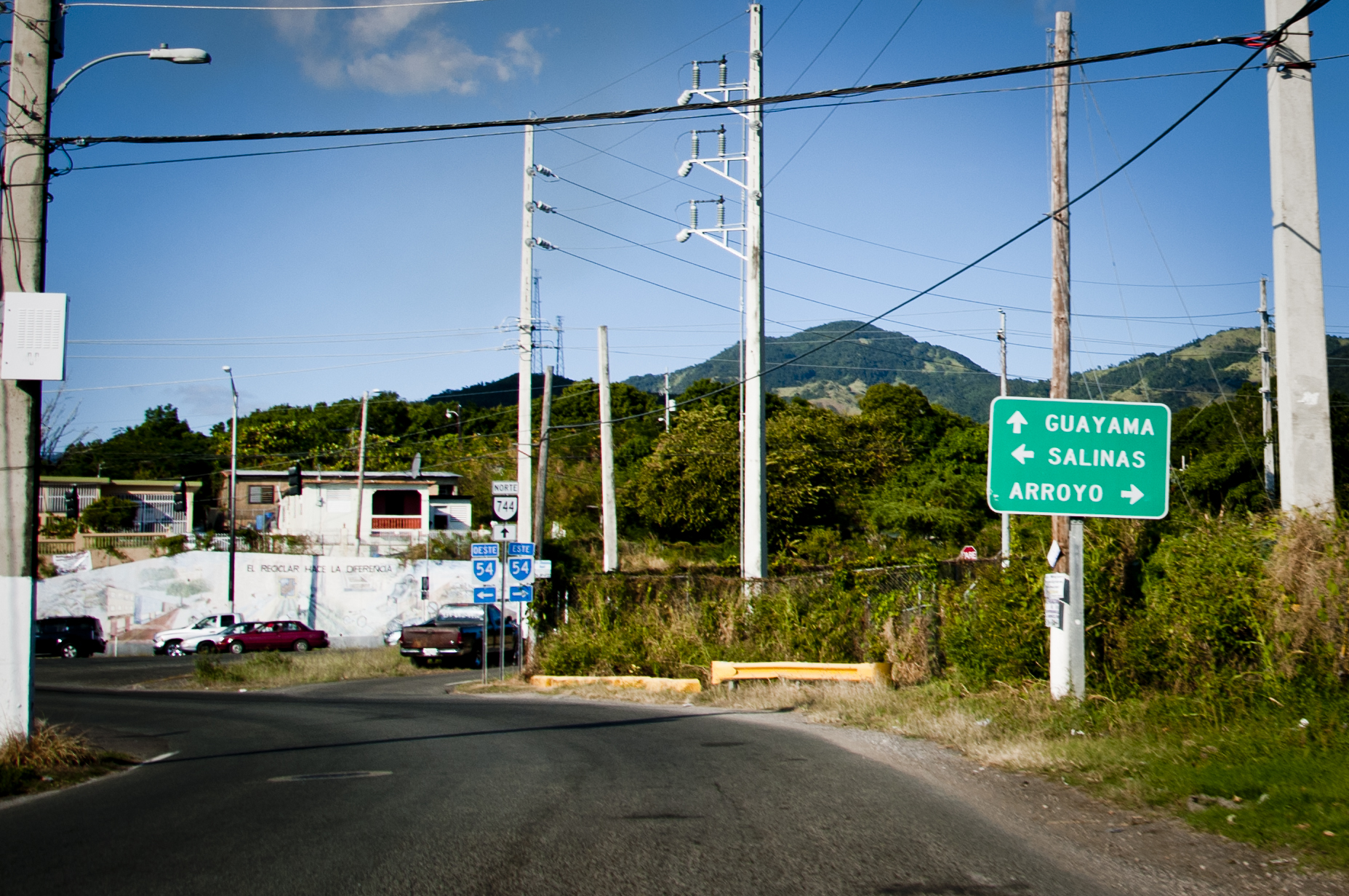
Approaching Highway 54 junction in Machete barrio, Guayama

Location	km	mi	Destinations	Notes
Palmas	0.0	0.0	PR-53 west (Autopista José M. Dávila Monsanto) – Ponce, San Juan	Western terminus of PR-54
Pozo Hondo	0.6	0.37	PR-7711 (Camino Pozo Hondo) – Pozo Hondo	
Guayama barrio-pueblo	1.2	0.75	PR-3 – Guayama, Salinas	
Guayama barrio-pueblo	1.7	1.1	PR-Calle Arnaldo Bristol / PR-Calle Paseo del Pueblo – Guayama	
Guayama barrio-pueblo	2.2	1.4	PR-Avenida José A. Torres / PR-Calle B – Guayama	
Guayama barrio-pueblo	2.8	1.7	PR-744 – Guayama, Machete	
Guayama barrio-pueblo	3.7	2.3	PR-Avenida Periferal Sur – Guayama	
Algarrobo	5.1– 5.2	3.2– 3.2	PR-748 – Guayama	
Algarrobo	6.20	3.85	PR-3 – Guayama, Arroyo	Eastern terminus of PR-54 and PR-748
Algarrobo	6.20	3.85	PR-748	Continuation beyond PR-3
1.000 mi = 1.609 km; 1.000 km = 0.621 mi: Route transition

== See also ==
- Pedro Albizu Campos
