= Machete (disambiguation) =

A machete is a broad blade used either as an implement like an axe, or in combat like a short sword.

Machete may also refer to:

== Film ==
- Machete (1958 film), directed by Kurt Neumann
- Machete (2010 film), directed by Robert Rodriguez

== Music ==
- Machete (musical instrument)
- Machete Music, a record label

=== Songs ===
- "Machete", by Buckethead
- "Machete", by Daddy Yankee
- "Machete", by DJ Hazard
- "Machete", by Moby from Play (Moby album)
- "Machete", by Tito & Tarantula
- "Machete", by Amanda Palmer

== People ==
- Juan Carlos Arias Acosta, Colombian cyclist who has this nickname
- Ricky Vega, Puerto Rican American professional wrestler who was used this ring name
- Mike Machette, American tennis player

== Places ==
- Machete, Guayama, Puerto Rico, a barrio

== Other uses ==
- Machete (comics), any of three fictional characters from the Marvel Comics Universe
- Machete, imprint of Ohio State University Press
- Machete (TV series)
- Control Machete, a band
- Pacific Ladyfish, an slender species of Elopid fish sometimes referred to as "Machete"
