= Vizcarrondo =

Vizcarrondo is a surname. Notable people with the surname include:

- Augusto Valentín Vizcarrondo, Puerto Rican politician
- Carlos Vizcarrondo (born 1955), Puerto Rican judge and politician
- Julio Vizcarrondo (1829–1889), Puerto Rican abolitionist, journalist and politician
- Maria Vizcarrondo-De Soto (born c. 1951), Puerto Rican businessperson
- Oswaldo Vizcarrondo (born 1984), Venezuelan footballer
