= Luis Santaliz Capestany =

Puerto Rican politician

Member of the Puerto Rico Senate from the Aguadilla district
- In office 1961–1969

Mayor of Las Marías
- In office 1945–1948

Member of the Puerto Rico House of Representatives from the 19th district
- In office 1948–1956

Personal details
- Born: October 26, 1914 Mayagüez, Puerto Rico
- Died: November 17, 1989 (aged 75) Las Marías, Puerto Rico
- Party: Popular Democratic Party
- Profession: Farmer, politician, senator

Luis Santaliz Capestany (October 26, 1914 – November 17, 1989) was one of the members of the Constitutional Convention of Puerto Rico which met from 1951 to 1952 and drafted what is now known as the Constitution of Puerto Rico. Previously, he served as Mayor of the town of Las Marías, Puerto Rico from 1945 to 1948 and also a Member of the Puerto Rico House of Representatives for the 19 district from 1948 to 1956.

Graduated from Academia de la Inmaculada Concepción in Mayagüez, Puerto Rico class of 1939.

He died on Wednesday, November 22, 1989. His body was found by the police in the vicinity of the La Cintrona ravine in the Maravilla Norte neighborhood in Las Marías, where his residence was located. Santaliz Capestany had disappeared from his residence the previous Friday and his car was found by the police in the vicinity of the sector. He was 73 years old.

He is honored by his native town with one of its main public elementary schools, named after him.
