= Ramón Barrios =

Puerto Rican politician

Member of the Puerto Rico Senate from the San Juan district
- In office 1941–1944

Personal details
- Born: Ramón Genaro Barrios Sánchez; August 31, 1886 Manatí, Puerto Rico
- Died: April 1, 1973 (aged 86) Bayamón, Puerto Rico
- Party: Socialist Party (Puerto Rico)

Ramón Genaro Barrios Sánchez was one of three Constitutional Convention of Puerto Rico members representing the Puerto Rico Socialist Party, a non-Marxist Leninist political organization active in Puerto Rico until the early 1950s.

Barrios-Sánchez, born in Manatí, Puerto Rico in 1882 and lived in Ciales, Puerto Rico, was elected to the Socialist Party's Territorial Committee in 1936 from the San Juan. In 1940, along with Celestino Iriarte, he unsuccessfully ran for the Senate of Puerto Rico from San Juan under the Socialist banner. That year, he also was a Socialist Party delegate in the Committee on the Pact to determine possible alliances with the Statehood Republican Party.

During the Constitutional Convention proceedings, he was a member of the Rules Committee, as well as the Calendar Committee. Ramon Barrios Sánchez is one of the signers of the Constitution of Puerto Rico. His signature along with the other members’ signatures is on display at the Capitol in San Juan, Puerto Rico. He was responsible for implementing laws and mandates benefiting the laborers, e.g., to carry less than 100 pounds on their backs and against having to work in the rain. He was a natural orator who traveled around the island doing speeches on behalf of his political party. A self-made man who started as a tobacco plant worker in Puerto Rico. He died on April 1, 1973, in Bayamón, Puerto Rico. He was buried at Porta Coeli Cemetery in Bayamón, Puerto Rico.
