= Juan R. García Delgado =

Puerto Rican lawyer and statesman

Juan Rocafort García Delgado was born in 1918 in Hatillo, Puerto Rico and died on 7 July 1969, in Quebradillas, Puerto Rico, as a result of an automobile accident. He was a recognized lawyer and statesman in Puerto Rico. He was a member of the Constitutional Convention of Puerto Rico, a signer of the Constitution of Puerto Rico, and a lifelong advocate of statehood for Puerto Rico.

== Studies ==
García Delgado graduated with a law degree from the University of Mississippi School of Law.

== Personal life ==
He was one of nine (9) children of Gerardo Garcia and Maria Delgado.

He was married to Nilda Siverio. They had five (5) children, Gerardo Juan, Manuel, Marinilda, Pedro Jaime, and Francisco.
