= Joaquín Rosa Gómez =

Puerto Rican politician

Member of the Puerto Rico Senate from the At-large district
- In office 1953–1956

Mayor of Manatí
- In office 1945–1952
- In office 1961–1968

Personal details
- Born: August 7, 1897 Manatí, Puerto Rico
- Died: July 16, 1977 (aged 79) Manatí, Puerto Rico
- Party: Popular Democratic Party
- Spouse: Lydia N. Rosa
- Children: Gloria, Otin, Ana Elba, Quin, Joaco, Zaida, Tato, Milagros, Pedro, José, Olga, Roberto, and Yadira
- Profession: Public administrator, businessman, industrialist, senator, politician

Joaquín Rosa Gómez (August 7, 1897 – July 16, 1977) was a Puerto Rican public administrator, businessman, industrialist, senator, and politician. He served as a member of the Senate of Puerto Rico from 1953 to 1956. He was also a delegate to the 1952 Constitutional Assembly, which drafted the Constitution of Puerto Rico. He served as Mayor of the City of Manatí for four terms.

== Early years ==
Joaquín Rosa was born on August 7, 1897, in Manatí, the son of José Rosa and Candelaria Gómez. He was married to Lydia N. Rosa, and their children were Gloria, Otin, Ana Elba, Quin, Joaco, Zaida, Tato, Milagros, Pedro, José, Olga, Roberto, and Yadira.

== Business career ==
He worked as an industrialist in the tobacco cultivation and processing sector.

== Political career ==
Joaquín Rosa was one of the founding members of the Popular Democratic Party (PPD) and served as the party's municipal leader in the City of Manatí from its founding. In the 1944 elections, he ran for Mayor of Manatí and was elected, serving as Mayor from 1945 to 1948. He was reelected in the subsequent election and held the office for a second term from 1949 to 1952.

In the 1952 elections, he ran for a Senate seat at-large, was elected, and served from 1953 to 1956. He was Vice President of the Commission on State and Municipal Government and Secretary of the Commission on Industry and Commerce.

Joaquín Rosa was also elected as a delegate representing the Arecibo District to the 1952 Constitutional Assembly that drafted the Constitution of Puerto Rico. He served on the Rules and Bylaws Committee and was the 82nd of 91 delegates to sign the new Constitution on February 6, 1952.

In the 1960 elections, at the request of the PPD leadership in the Municipality of Manatí, he once again ran for mayor of the municipality and was elected. He was reelected in 1964, serving as mayor from 1961 to 1968.

Rosa was one of the Popular Democratic leaders who supported the reelection of Governor Roberto Sánchez Vilella at the PPD General Assembly. However, after the governor's defeat, Rosa did not follow him in the creation of a new political party.

Rosa served as Mayor of Manatí for a total of sixteen (16) years. He lost his bid for reelection in the 1968 elections to Juan Ramón Colón Lugo, candidate of the New Progressive Party (PNP).

After completing his term as mayor, he retired from elective politics.

== Later and death ==
Joaquín Rosa Gómez died on Saturday, July 16, 1977, after a long illness. His remains rest at the Municipal Cemetery of Manatí.

== Legacy ==
The Manatí Center for the Fine Arts bears his name, as approved by Resolution 37, Series 2002–2003, of the Manatí Municipal Legislature on December 16, 2002.
