= University of Puerto Rico School of Dental Medicine =

Dental school of the University of Puerto Rico

University of Puerto Rico School of Dental Medicine
Established	1957
School type	Public
Dean	Noel Aymat (Acting)
Location	San Juan, Puerto Rico
Enrollment	Unknown
Homepage	http://dental.rcm.upr.edu/

The University of Puerto Rico School of Dental Medicine is the dental school of the University of Puerto Rico. It is located on the University of Puerto Rico, Medical Sciences Campus in San Juan, Puerto Rico. It is the only dental school in Puerto Rico. It is accredited by the American Dental Association.

== History ==
In January 1955 Dr. Harold W. Brown, Ex-Dean of the School of Public Health of Columbia University, submitted his study on the needs of Physicians and Dentists in Puerto Rico (1). This study was conducted at the request of the then Chancellor of the University of Puerto Rico, Graduate Jaime Benitez. The study revealed that the ratio of dentists per capita then in Puerto Rico was one in every nine thousand inhabitants, approximately (1 / 8949). This rate was considered very inferior compared to the United States, by that time, was one in every thousand seven hundred approximately (1.677). In those years, the majority of dentists practicing in Puerto Rico and American school graduates projected that U.S. schools would not increase admissions of Puerto Rican students in the proportions necessary to improve the situation of the small number of dentists in Puerto Rico. Moreover, it is envisioned that for various reasons would be more difficult for Puerto Rican students could gain access to American schools in the immediate future.

As part of this study and in coordination with the College of Dental Surgeons of Puerto Rico were surveyed dentists in Puerto Rico, as a professional class, demonstrating a massive boost to the creation of a dental school in the country. This study concluded that, based on the low ratio of dentists to existing population and the inability to improve it with the option of educating dentists in accredited schools outside the country, there was a need to establish a dental school built with the School of Medicine, University of Puerto Rico. In April 1955, Dr. Harold Hinman, Dean of the School of Medicine, University of Puerto Rico and Dr. Shailer Peterson, Secretary of the Board of Dental Education American Dental Association, signed a statement which recommended the university to delineate plans for developing an educational program to train dental residents of Puerto Rico to meet the oral health needs of the country, based on the advice of East and Brown.

The lawyer Jaime Benitez, then Rector of the University of Puerto Rico, submitted a request to the Council for Higher Education, with Dr. Peterson's paper as a reference, to create the School of Dentistry. In an extraordinary meeting on 27 January 1956, the Council accepted the report of the Rector and approved the establishment of the School of Dentistry linked to the School of Medicine, University of Puerto Rico, according to Certification # 85 of 6 February 1956. In it was established that the approval was made without the university to have the funds necessary for implementation. Therefore, the rector was empowered to manage themselves and not make any commitments until they have the required funds. To this end, it was not possible to project at this time that the Dental School could begin operations.

On 8 March 1956 the doctor Ubaldino Ramirez de Arellano, a dentist by profession and a congressman, introduced House Joint Resolution 3122 which allocated the funds during the 1956–57 fiscal year to cover the costs for planning and buying equipment to establish the School of Dentistry (2). At the meeting of 24 May 1956, approved the resolution with a unanimous vote of 43 votes for and 0 against. This project was approved in the Senate of Puerto Rico without amendment on 30 May 1956. The adoption of the law occurred on 21 June 1956 with the signature of Governor Luis Muñoz Marín.

The lawyer appointed Dr. Raymond Baralt Jr. as the first dean of the newly created School of Dentistry, University of Puerto Rico effective July 1, 1956 as soon learned of the signing of the bill by the Governor. A year later, on Monday, 19 August 1957, the school began its academic functions with 29 students. Some of the courses in biomedical sciences, administratively under the School of Medicine, were initially shared by the students of Dentistry and Medicine, gradually creating separate courses after the first year of dental school operations. The faculty and school administration made great efforts to develop academic programs, establish rules and procedures, design and build appropriate facilities (clinics and laboratories), while the teaching work was done. In the academic year 1960–61, the school had 102 students of dentistry.

In March 1961 it received official accreditation visit Dental Education Council of the American Dental Association. Subsequently, the agency told the Rector Jaime Benitez the status of "Full Approval" Under-graduate Program of Dentistry, University of Puerto Rico, in a communication dated 13 March 1961. Thereafter, the School of Dentistry has maintained its accreditation continuously.

The first acts of graduation, for receptacles of the degree of Doctor of Dental Medicine, took place on 2 June 1961 at the Teatro de la Universidad de Puerto Rico. In the years following its establishment were created graduate programs Histopathology, Oral and Maxillofacial Surgery, Pediatric Dentistry and Prosthodontics. Later, two programs were introduced in General Practice Residency in the year 1987 and Orthodontics in 1997. Dr. McKelvey served as dean during the period between 1961 and 1972, which welcomed the withdrawal. In that year he appointed Dr. Alberto Tossas, who turned into the first alumnus to hold the position of Dean of the School of Dentistry. In the same year the Medical Sciences Campus moved to its new facility at the Medical Center.

The training programs for staff support of the profession were established under the administration of the school. Among these programs were created Dental Assistants, Dental Hygiene, Dental Technology and Training program Assistants in Extended Functions. Later, as a result of the reorganization of the Medical Sciences Campus in 1976, they were transferred to the College of Health Related Professions, now the School of Health Professions.

== Academics ==
The School's curriculum has been revised several times in response to internal and external environment and responding to accreditation standards. Among the highlights are early clinical experiences, use of simulators in pre-clinical laboratories, treatment patient-centered comprehensive, competency-based assessment, innovative educational methods as standardized patients, scientific evidence-based learning among others. The School of Dentistry has taken a leadership role in the international community. Graduate programs have received professional Central and South America and Spain for training in various specialized areas of dentistry. An excellent example of this initiative is the school's contribution to the development of dental curriculum at the University of Granada, in its decision to establish a separate School of Dental Medicine, satisfy the requirements of the European Economic Community.

The School of Dentistry has a Division of Continuing Education since 1959 and is a major supplier of this type of education for the local professional community at the level of Central and South America, Spain and other international standards. This division has been innovative in developing distance education and by CCTV. In 2005, the School of Dentistry opened an amphitheater with all the modern facilities of educational technology for offering continuing education courses. The School of Dentistry has maintained steady progress throughout its history, and the celebration of the 50th anniversary of its foundation confirms its institutional maturity.

University of Puerto Rico School of Dentistry awards following degrees:

- Doctor of Dental Medicine
- D.M.D.-Ph.D. Training Program

== Research ==
As an integral part of its mission, the School of Dentistry has developed a significant work in research at all levels. The generation of new knowledge is critical because it results in improved oral health and general health of the population. Research Center, School of Dentistry has led efforts to address inequalities in oral health in Puerto Rico, and other Hispanic communities in the United States in aspects of oral cancer, dental caries and periodontal disease. The latter by their particular relationship with cardiovascular disease, diabetes, pregnant women and their relationship to low birth weight and prematurity. The Research Center has been diligent in seeking funds to support research and has received an endowment fund of $15 million and has signed cooperation agreements with prestigious universities such as, for example, NYU, Columbia University, Seattle University, University of Minnesota, University of Michigan and Indiana University. Concurrently, has made efforts to develop future researchers to coordinate research experiences during the summers at various universities and research intensive, like the National Institutes of Health.

== Departments ==
University of Puerto Rico School of Dental Medicine includes the following departments:

- Ecological Sciences Department
- Restorative Sciences Department
- Surgical Sciences Department

== See also ==
- American Student Dental Association
