= Carlos Román Benítez =

Puerto Rican journalist (1903–1965)

Member of the Puerto Rico Senate from the San Juan district
- In office January 2, 1953 – January 1, 1964

Secretary of the Puerto Rico Senate
- In office January 2, 1965 – December 25, 1965
- Preceded by: Julio Morales Rodríguez
- Succeeded by: Diego Román Artíguez

Personal details
- Born: September 16, 1903 Río Grande, Puerto Rico
- Died: December 25, 1965 (aged 62) San Juan, Puerto Rico
- Party: Popular Democratic
- Profession: Politician

Carlos Román Benítez (September 16, 1903 – December 25, 1965) was a Puerto Rican Journalist, poet, senator, and delegate to the Constitutional Convention of Puerto Rico.

== Political career ==
Born in Río Grande, Puerto Rico he was a member of the Senate of Puerto Rico from 1953 to 1964 representing the Popular Democratic Party (PPD) been elected for the San Juan district.

In the 1920s, he began his participation in Puerto Rican political life as a militant of the nationalist movement. In the 1928 elections, as a member of the Party Board for the San Juan district, Román Benítez was expelled from the party for having publicly endorsed the manifesto published by Attorney Samuel R. Quiñones, in which the manifesto advised nationalist voters to vote for the party known for its faith in the Puerto Rican Alliance.

The Municipal Assembly of Trujillo Alto, Puerto Rico declared him "Favorite Son" of that town, where he resided for several years and during which he held the position of president of the Municipal Committee of the Puerto Rico Popular Party.

He was delegated to the First Pro-Independence Congress in 1943. He participated as a Delegate at the Puerto Rico Constitutional Convention of 1951-1952.

He took office on January 2, 1965, as secretary of the Senate, was appointed by the president of the Senate, Samuel R. Quiñones, as interim secretary, and was elected by the full Senate on January 11, 1965.

== Journalist career and writer ==
He was the author of several works, including a book of verses titled "Hojas Color de Tiempo." He worked as a journalist, served as head of the editorial section, and was interim director of "La Democracia." Additionally, he worked at "El Imparcial." He also distinguished himself in the radio program "El Diario Hablado de la Democracia y el Batey," the organ of the Popular Party, and in the "Diario de Puerto Rico."

== Death ==
Carlos Román Benítez died on December 25, 1965 at the age of 62 in San Juan, Puerto Rico. At that time he was Secretary of the Puerto Rico Senate. He was buried at Buxeda Memorial Park Cemetery in Río Piedras, Puerto Rico.
