= Lionel Fernández Méndez =

Puerto Rican politician

Member of the Puerto Rico Senate from the Guayama district
- In office 1949–1972
- In office Member of the Constitutional Assembly of Puerto Rico for the Commonwealth of Puerto Rico – 1952

Personal details
- Born: January 24, 1915 Cayey, Puerto Rico
- Died: February 17, 1998 (aged 83) San Juan, Puerto Rico
- Party: Popular Democratic Party (PPD)
- Other political affiliations: Democratic
- Spouse: Ana Usera
- Children: Ana Milagros (Lindy) and Lionel Julio
- Education: Georgetown University Law School (JD)
- Occupation: Politician, Senator, Attorney

Military service
- Allegiance: United States of America
- Branch/service: United States Army
- Unit: United States Army Judge Advocate General's Corps U.S. Army Legal Division San Juan

Lionel Fernández Méndez (January 24, 1915 – February 17, 1998) was a Puerto Rican attorney and politician. He was a member of the Constitutional Assembly that created the Commonwealth of Puerto Rico (1951–1952). He was a senator for the Popular Democratic Party from 1949 to 1972. He was a member of Phi Sigma Alpha.

== Biography ==
He was born in Cayey, Puerto Rico. His father was Benigno Fernández García, and his mother Maria Luisa Mendez Vazquez. He grew up in Cayey and in San Juan, when his father became U.S. District Attorney General and his family lived in the official residence designated within La Fortaleza, the Governor's Mansion in Old San Juan.

His father, Attorney Benigno Fernández García, whose statue honoring him presently stands at the Cayey town Plaza, was his major inspiration, and led his path into politics, law and public service. As successor of his father's political path, Lionel Fernandez Mendez, followed in his father's footsteps in his personal commitment to social justice for the poor through public service. Just like his father had before, he also studied law at Georgetown University Law Center in Washington, D.C., and upon his graduation returned to Puerto Rico to practice law.

At a young age of 24 years he was nominated to run for the presidency of the Colegio de Abogados (Puerto Rico Bar Association). At this early age, Luis Munoz Marin, with whom he had established a strong bond of friendship during his Georgetown student days, as well as a loyal friend of his father, also recommended him for the position of Labor Commissioner of Puerto Rico. All these important events coincided with the greetings from the United States Army for military service; so he enlisted and was appointed to the Judge Advocate General's Corps, United States Army, serving with honors at the U.S. Army Legal Division in San Juan, Puerto Rico, during the Second World War.

In 1948, he was elected as the senator for the District of Guayama, which included Cayey, his birthplace and hometown, and eleven other towns of the island of Puerto Rico. He was continuously re-elected by his constituents as senator for the terms of the years 1952, 1956, 1960, 1964,1968, until 1972.

In 1952 he was elected to be a member of the Constitutional Assembly of Puerto Rico, working in collaboration with other illustrious founding fathers such as: Luis Munoz Marin, Dr. Antonio Fernos Isern, Jaime Benitez, Luis Negrón López, Jose Villares Rodriguez, Victor Gutierrez Franqui, Miguel Angel Garcia Mendez, Jose Trias Monge and other illustrious and prominent countrymen that collaborated as members of the Constitutional Assembly in the drafting of the Constitution, that presently governs the island of Puerto Rico. The original Constitution with the signature of the Founding Fathers, can be seen today in a showcase at the Rotunda of the Capitol in San Juan, Puerto Rico.

"His legacy as politician and statesman cannot be limited to his contributions within the Constitutional Assembly, whereby he bravely defended an inclusion to the right of the citizen to reply to an offense of slander and libel to his dignity and reputation in the press, among other rights that were to be established as a right of the citizens, but his labor also extended to other valuable legislation pieces filled with true wisdom and insights, during his years truly dedicated to public life".

Among his visible works are the progress achieved through the creation of hundreds of jobs through the establishment in Cayey, as well as in the rest of his district, of factories through the Fomento Industrialization Program, that brought would much needed progress to these poor regions. He also collaborated through legislation with the Luis A. Ferre Expressway Project that would connect San Juan to Ponce, and would cross the central mountain region of the island, thereby opening the way to progress in all the towns that it connected. He was crucial in achieving a regional college of the University of Puerto Rico, so the students in the mountain towns would have a place of study, not having to travel to the distant campuses in San Juan and Mayaguez. The Cayey campus of the University of Puerto Rico was established in the former military camp in Cayey known as Henry Barracks, a grant by the U.S. government to the University of Puerto Rico, which he negotiated. Acquiring a large campus in the midst of the mountains surrounded by nature, strategically located in the central region of the island, and in time it has grown to be an educational hub for the region, attracting faculty and students alike to prime educational facilities all quite an accomplishment for the time. These milestones were the result of his efforts as senator at all levels, since he was fully committed to education since he believed that you never stopped learning in life, and that it was the only thing that you actually personally really owned, which no one could ever take away from you.

In 28 years as president of several committees as senator, he gave proof of his leadership in many legislative pieces that carry his signature, and also guided much needed legislation within the legislative process, through difficult and complicated times, where the political parties changed their leadership roles, but he was able to prevail within these changing times, by garnering great friendships and alliances even within the ranks of political rivals, for the final approval of valuable legislation for the benefit of all. He exerted his leadership also in Washington, D.C and in the U.S. Congress, building alliances for the benefit of Puerto Rico, and establishing enduring relations with its major influential members of the time, while serving as chairman of the U. S. Democratic Party for Puerto Rico. Upon his retirement as senator in 1972, he was appointed general counsel to the Office of the President of the Senate of Puerto Rico, when Juan Cancel Rios was President of the Senate, where he continued his dedication to the progress and growth of Puerto Rico.

"In his early decades as a young senator, he was inspired and committed to the betterment of the "jibaros" (mountain dwellers) his beloved constituents, in order to make way for education, housing, health services, better living conditions, better roads and communication, and for a better life for all his countrymen. He was born into public service, to which he fully dedicated his life, always in the pursuit of a better life for all who at one time lived in extreme poverty, and in great need of all the basics of life. With great dedication he was able to achieve his ideals, plans and goals, and in time, was able to witness in his old age with great satisfaction, the fruits of his labor".

Loving the symbiosis of students and teachers, and the valuable exchange that enriched all, he taught Constitutional Law at the Puerto Rico Junior College, at request of its dean, and he expressed in jest, that the ones who were actually educating him, were the young students in their zest for knowledge, more than him.

Lionel Fernandez Mendez died in 1998 in San Juan, Puerto Rico, at the age of 83, and is buried at Cayey Municipal Cemetery in the family plot where his father Benigno Fernandez Garcia also rests.
