= Ubaldino Ramírez de Arellano =

Puerto Rican politician and basketball player

Member of the Puerto Rico House of Representatives
- In office 1945–1952

Personal details
- Born: July 24, 1894 San Germán, Puerto Rico
- Died: December 8, 1982 (aged 88) San Germán, Puerto Rico
- Party: Popular Democratic Party
- Spouse: Angeles Poventud
- Children: Ubaldino Jose; Angeles; Jose Alfredo
- Occupation: Politician, Dentist

Ubaldino Ramírez de Arellano Quiñones was born in San Germán, Puerto Rico. He was a dentist and state legislator and he was known as the "Father of Basketball" in San German. His parents were José Ubaldino Ramírez de Arellano Lugo and María Matilde Quiñones Quiñones. While in university he joined Phi Sigma Alpha fraternity.

In his youth he played professional basketball. He was later the first president Liga Puertorriqueña de Baloncesto. He was a member of the Puerto Rico House of Representatives from 1945 till 1952.

In 1949 he and others such as James Edward McManus, Bishop of Ponce, and Senator Santiago R. Palmer achieved that, for the nominal price of one dollar, the church of Porta Coeli in San German be sold to the Government of Puerto Rico so that it be responsible for its safekeeping and preservation.

In 1951 he served in the Legislative Commission of the Constitutional Assembly that created the Constitution of Puerto Rico. He was also one of the signer of the Constitution of Puerto Rico.

On March 8, 1956, he introduced Joint Resolution 3122 which allocated the funds during the 1956-57 fiscal year to cover the costs for planning and buying equipment to establish the University of Puerto Rico School of Dental Medicine. At the meeting of 24 May 1956, approved the resolution with a unanimous vote of 43 votes for and 0 against. This project was approved in the Senate of Puerto Rico without amendment on 30 May 1956. The adoption of the law occurred on 21 June 1956 with the signature of Governor Luis Muñoz Marín.

== Death ==
Ubaldino Ramirez de Arellano died on December 8, 1982, at age 88. He was buried at Trujillo Cemetery in San Germán, Puerto Rico.

== Legacy ==
There is a basketball court in San German that bears his name Cancha Ubaldino Ramírez de Arellano, the Atléticos de San Germán used to play there. He was amongst those mentioned for the nineteen-twenties by the "Comite de Sabios" of the BSN in 2008 that named the best Basketball players of Puerto Rico by decade.

== Personal life ==
He married Angeles Poventud in Ponce Cathedral, Ponce, Puerto Rico. They had three children, Ubaldino Jose "Don Nino" Ramirez de Arellano, Angeles Ramirez de Arellano and Jose Alfredo Ramirez de Arellano.
