= José M. Dávila Monsanto =

Puerto Rican politician (1905–2001)

Member of the Puerto Rico Senate from the Guayama district
- In office 1945–1948

Personal details
- Born: November 2, 1905 Yabucoa, Puerto Rico
- Died: April 4, 2001 (aged 95) Guayama, Puerto Rico
- Party: Popular Democratic Party (PPD)
- Spouse: Inés Lópes Rodríguez
- Children: Inés María; José Manuel; Juan Antonio
- Education: University of Puerto Rico (B.Ed.); University of Puerto Rico School of Law (JD)
- Occupation: Politician, Senator, Lawyer
- In 1938, he co-founded the "Partido Popular Democrático de Puerto Rico"

José M. Dávila Monsanto (November 2, 1905 – April 4, 2001) was a Puerto Rican politician and lawyer who in 1938 co-founded the political party Partido Popular Democrático de Puerto Rico (Popular Democratic Party of Puerto Rico or "PPD"). He served in the Puerto Rican Senate as senator for the Guayama district.

== Early years ==
Dávila Monsanto was one of eight siblings born to Juan A. Dávila and María Monsanto in the town of Yabucoa, Puerto Rico. There he received his primary education. He moved to Rio Piedras, where he finished his secondary education at the Normal School of the University of Puerto Rico and after his graduation he was accepted in the university where he earned his bachelor's degree in Education. He went on to study law and in 1934 earned his Juris Doctor from the University of Puerto Rico School of Law. On August 20, 1937, Dávila Monsanto married Inés Lopés Rodríguez on August 20, 1937, and had three children; Inés María, José Manuel and Juan Antonio.

== Political activism ==
During his student years in the University, Dávila Monsanto became active in politics. He was a member of the Liberal Party of Puerto Rico, a pro-independence political party. He was elected vice-president of the Juventud Liberal de Puerto Rico (the Liberal Youth of Puerto Rico), the youth branch of the PPD, and also served as president of the Rio Piedras chapter of the Juventud Liberal de Rio Piedras (the Liberal Youth of Rio Piedras). In 1935, Dávila Monsanto set up his law practice in Rio Piedras and continued to practice there until 1941, when he moved to the town of Guayama, Puerto Rico.

The Río Piedras massacre of four Puerto Rican Nationalist Party members occurred on October 24, 1935. The Nationalist Party blamed these deaths on Elisha Francis Riggs, a former United States Army Colonel whom, at the time, was the top U.S.-appointed police officer on the entire island. Consequently, on February 23, 1936, Colonel Riggs was assassinated by Nationalists Hiram Rosado and Elías Beauchamp. This prompted U.S Senator Millard Tydings to introduce a legislation to grant independence to Puerto Rico. Dávila Monsanto was in favor of the proposal. However Luis Muñoz Marín objected because, in his view, Puerto Rico was incapable of independence without U.S. economic support.

== Partido Popular Democratico de Puerto Rico ==
In 1938, Dávila Monsanto joined various former members of the Liberal Party, such as Luis Muñoz Marín, Felisa Rincon de Gautier and Ernesto Ramos Antonini and founded the "Partido Popular Democratico de Puerto Rico" known in English as the "Popular Democratic Party of Puerto Rico" (PDP). The party at first ran on an independence platform, but later abandoned the idea and instead supported Puerto Rico's right to self-determination and sovereignty, through the enhancement of Puerto Rico's status as a commonwealth of the United States. He was named the party's vice-president in the town of Guayama.

In 1940, he served on the Advisory Board of the Selective Service in Rio Piedras. From 1942 to 1945, he served on the governing board of the Colegio de Abogados de Puerto Rico. In 1943, he was elected and served as a delegate to the first Pro Independence Congress. In 1944, Dávila Monsanto, was elected to the Puerto Rican Senate in representation of the District of Guayama and presided over the Senate Regulations and Special Issues committee.

From 1951 to 1952, Dávila Monsanto was a member of the Constitutional Convention that drafted the Constitution of Puerto Rico. As a member of the assembly, he fought for the abolition of the death penalty.

== Legacy ==
In 1978, the town of Guayama proclaimed Dávila Monsanto Hijo Adoptivo Distinguido de la Ciudad de Guayama (Distinguished Adopted Son of the City of Guayama). On April 4, 2001, Dávila Monsanto died in his home in Guayama.

The government of Puerto Rico named the highway that extends from PR-54 (Puerto Rico Highway 54), in Guayama, to PR-52, in Salinas the Autopista José M. Dávila Monsanto (the José M. Dávila Monsanto Highway).

== See also ==
- List of Puerto Ricans
