= Ramiro L. Colón =

Puerto Rican businessman

Member of the Puerto Rico Senate from the At Large district
- In office 1957–1968

Personal details
- Born: August 4, 1904 Ponce, Puerto Rico
- Died: November 4, 1983 (aged 79) Ponce, Puerto Rico
- Party: Partido Estadista Republicano
- Other political affiliations: Republican

Ramiro L. Colón (1904–1983), was the general manager of the Cooperativa de Cafeteros de Puerto Rico. He reorganized the company during its time of crisis and is credited with having saved the coffee industry in Puerto Rico.

== Early years ==
Colón (birth name: Ramiro L. Colón Colón), was born in and raised in the countryside of Ponce, Puerto Rico. There he received his primary and secondary education. Being raised in the country, he developed an intense love for the island's agriculture. He went to work for the "Cooperativa de Cafeteros de Puerto Rico" (Cooperative of Coffee Growers of Puerto Rico) in 1925, the same year it was founded, at the age of 21.

== "Cooperativa de Cafeteros de Puerto Rico" ==
The cooperative was the first one of its kind in Puerto Rico. It was founded to protect the coffee industry, which was one of the island's most important export products, from outside imitators. The situation was the following: many merchants were importing coffee from other countries, of poor quality and freshness, and passing them off as locally produced. When tourists and local consumers tasted the coffee, they complained about how bad it was, and as a result sales declined drastically and the coffee industry suffered greatly. In 1928, hurricane San Felipe destroyed most of the coffee plantations on the island, and the Great Depression also affected the economy.

== Colón becomes general manager ==
In 1932, Colón was named general manager of the cooperative and undertook the reorganization of the company during its time of crisis. The cooperative was almost bankrupt, and the first thing Colón did was to obtain a loan from the Department of Agriculture and Commerce. With the money, he bought new equipment to replace the old and outdated equipment in the company. Colón was able to convince the Puerto Rican legislature to pass a law against the then-rampant adulteration and contraband of coffee.

== "Cafe Rico" ==
Colón was credited with convincing the government to impose import tariffs on coffee, thereby ensuring the island would not be invaded by cheap coffee of poor quality, which often was advertised as locally produced. The cooperative purchased and installed a new torrefaction plant in which the local coffee was processed. Colon set out to gain access to the United States coffee market, helped the local coffee growers obtain lines of credit from local bankers, and got financial help from the federal and local government for the export of the cooperative's coffee. This coffee was named "Cafe Rico" and was well received locally and internationally, soon reestablishing the good fame of Puerto Rico's coffee worldwide. The cooperative became the first coffee manufacturer to sell its coffee in sealed cans. The quality of Cafe Rico has received numerous medals and recognition in contests celebrated all over the world.

== Cooperative expansion ==
Under Colon's leadership, the cooperative was able to expand and diversify. The company sells food and agricultural equipment with sales of over $5 million. It also owns and operates an egg processing company which calls its product "Huevos Rico" (Rico Eggs). The cooperative owns an insurance company, its own credit corporation that grants loans to farmers, and its own printing plant that prints and distributes an agricultural magazine worldwide. Recently, the cooperative has started to operate gasoline stations in San Juan, Mayaguez and Ponce.

When Colón took over the company in 1932 as a general manager the cooperative had only $284,000 in annual sales. By 1963 the cooperative had over $35,000,000 in sales. The cooperative has offices and warehouses in Ponce (main offices), San Juan, Mayagüez, Arecibo, Yauco, San Sebastian, Utuado, Adjuntas, Jayuya and Ciales.

== Legacy ==
Colón served as a senator, representing as a At-large member in the Puerto Rican Senate and was named Administrator of the cooperative, a position he held until his retirement in 1965. In 1952 the Constitution of Puerto Rico was adopted, creating the Commonwealth of Puerto Rico and Colón was a member of the Constitutional Convention of Puerto Rico. He was a delegate to Republican National Convention from Puerto Rico in the years 1948, 1952 and 1956. Ramiro L. Colón was candidate for governor in 1968 for the Republican Statehood Party.

Ramiro L. Colón died in the city of Ponce, he was buried at Cementerio La Piedad in Ponce. His memory was honored by naming an elementary school after him. He is remembered as the man who saved the Puerto Rican coffee industry.

== See also ==
- List of Puerto Ricans
