= Café Rico =

Puerto Rican corporation

Coordinates: 18°0′31.2474″N 66°36′2.3034″W

- Company type: Private
- Industry: Beverage
- Founded: 11 June 1924
- Headquarters: Ponce, Puerto Rico
- Key people: Ramón S. Torres Vélez; Julio Bravo Soler, General Manager
- Products: Coffee
- Website: http://www.caferico.com/ and http://www.yaucono.com/

Café Rico is a Puerto Rican corporation that manufactures coffee branded by the same name. The company's headquarters are located at Avenida Las Americas/Route 163 and Calle Comercio/Route 133 in Barrio San Antón in the city of Ponce, Puerto Rico. The company used to be called Cooperativa de Cafeteros (Coffee-growers Cooperative).

Its coffee has been reported to be Puerto Rico's best and its San Carlos Selection is said to have been the Vatican's favorite coffee at one time. The company has the only coffee tasting lab and the only Certified Taster on the Island. The company has a partnership with Yauco Selecto Estate Coffee.

== History ==
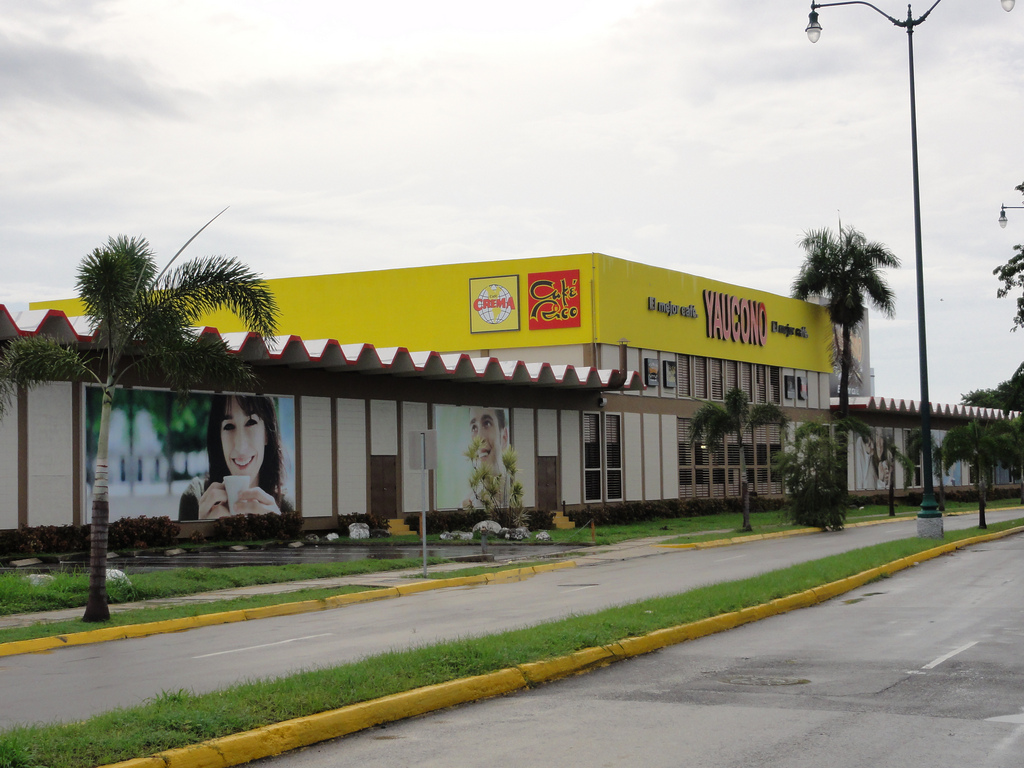
Café Rico headquarters in barrio San Antón

Cooperativa de Cafeteros was founded on 11 June 1924. Its first administrator was Ramiro L. Colon. It was the first agricultural cooperative union in Puerto Rico. One of its major goals, when it was founded, was to become a major player in the coffee business by being not just the major grower of Puerto Rican coffee, but also its major manufacturer.

In September 2009, the company closed the 110,000 square feet (10,000 m^{2}) Avenida Las Americas plant for renovations and Puerto Rico Coffee Roasters spent $8 million to reopen it again in December 2010. Today, the Las Americas plant performs some 60% of the company's coffee roasting operations there.

In July 2008, Puerto Rico Coffee Roaster purchased the Café Rico, Café Yaucono, and Café Rioja brands, thus acquiring about 60 percent of Puerto Rico's coffee market.

== Today ==
Today, Cafe Rico is the coffee with the highest sales in Puerto Rico. It is the only coffee packaged in a vacuum, a technique used to preserve the coffee's aroma. Annual 1965 sales are over $8 million. The company has packaging plants in Ponce and San Juan. It has new corporate headquarters in Barrio Sabanetas in Ponce.

After closing down the 110,000 square feet (10,000 m^{2}) Avenida Las Americas plant in September 2009, Puerto Rico Coffee Roasters spent $8 million and reopened it in December 2010. Today, the Las Americas plant performs some 60% of the company's coffee roasting operations there.

== Other activities ==
The company:

- Has an egg packaging subsidiary, called "Huevos Ricos".
- Has its own credit company
- Has its own insurance company, for insurance against hurricanes, earthquakes, liability, etc.
- Publishes the only agricultural magazine in Puerto Rico
- Recently diversified into gasoline retailing, with outlets in Ponce, San Juan, and Mayaguez

== Products ==
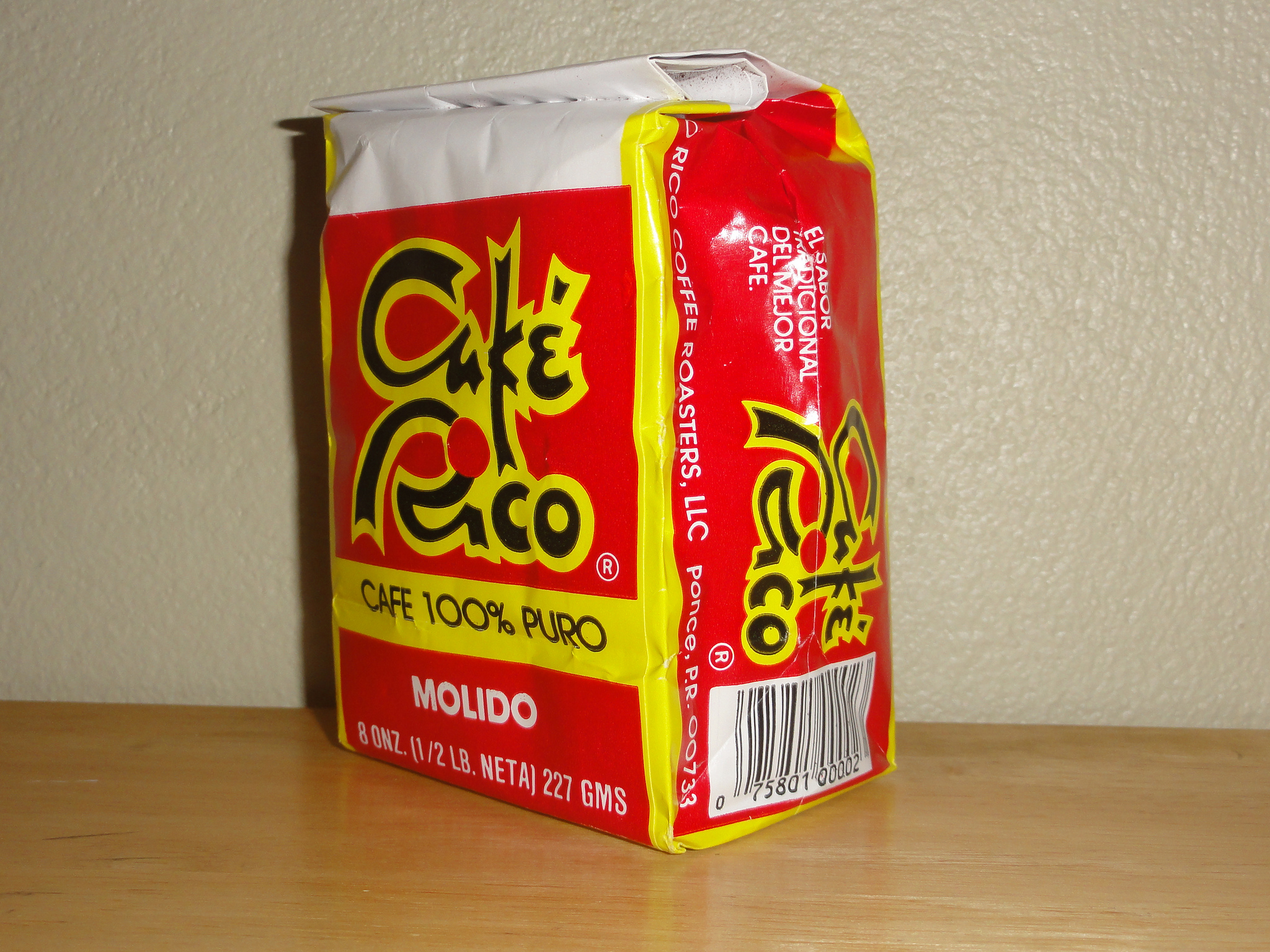
A bag of ground Café Rico

In July 2008, Puerto Rico Coffee Roaster acquired Cafe Rico as well as Cafe Yaucono and Cafe Rioja, which together account for some 60% of the coffee consumed in Puerto Rico. Cafe Rico stopped operations out of its Las Americas Avenue plant in Ponce in September 2008 but, in August 2010, Puerto Rico Coffee Roaster announced plans to invest US$8 million to bring the plant back into operation. With the investment, its Santurce operations will move to Ponce. This will make the Las Americas location "the largest coffee roasting location in the Caribbean" and the facility "the most modern coffee roasting facility in the Caribbean."

== Sales volume ==
During fiscal year 1962–63, the total volume of the cooperative was $35 million.

== Headquarters and warehouses ==
The central offices are in the city of Ponce. There are also branch offices in San Juan, Arecibo, Yauco, Mayaguez, San Sebastián, Utuado, Adjuntas, Jayuya, and Ciales.

== Federal relations ==
In the 1930s, the company had over $300,000 in escrow at the bank of Baltimore. It is an agricultural partner with the Federal Intermediate Credit Bank. It is a member of Federacion de Cooperativas de Estados Unidos, United Cooperatives, the Cooperative Grange League Federation, and the Pennsylvania Farm Bureau, the National Council for Farmer Cooperatives, and the American Institute for Cooperation.

== Economic outlook ==
The company has $10 million in resources, with reserves of $4 million. Membership in the guild is so large that its annual meetings, heavily attended by its members, requires a whole baseball stadium to carry it on. They take place at the Francisco Montaner Stadium in Ponce.

== Leadership ==
Its board of directors has 15 members, representing all coffee districts in Puerto Rico. Its past presidents have included Andrés Grillasca Salas. Its current Board of Directors includes Oreste Ramos.

== See also ==
- List of Puerto Ricans
- Puerto Rico
