= Guayama barrio-pueblo =

Historical and administrative center (seat) of Guayama, Puerto Rico

Guayama barrio-pueblo Pueblo de Guayama
- Municipality Seat
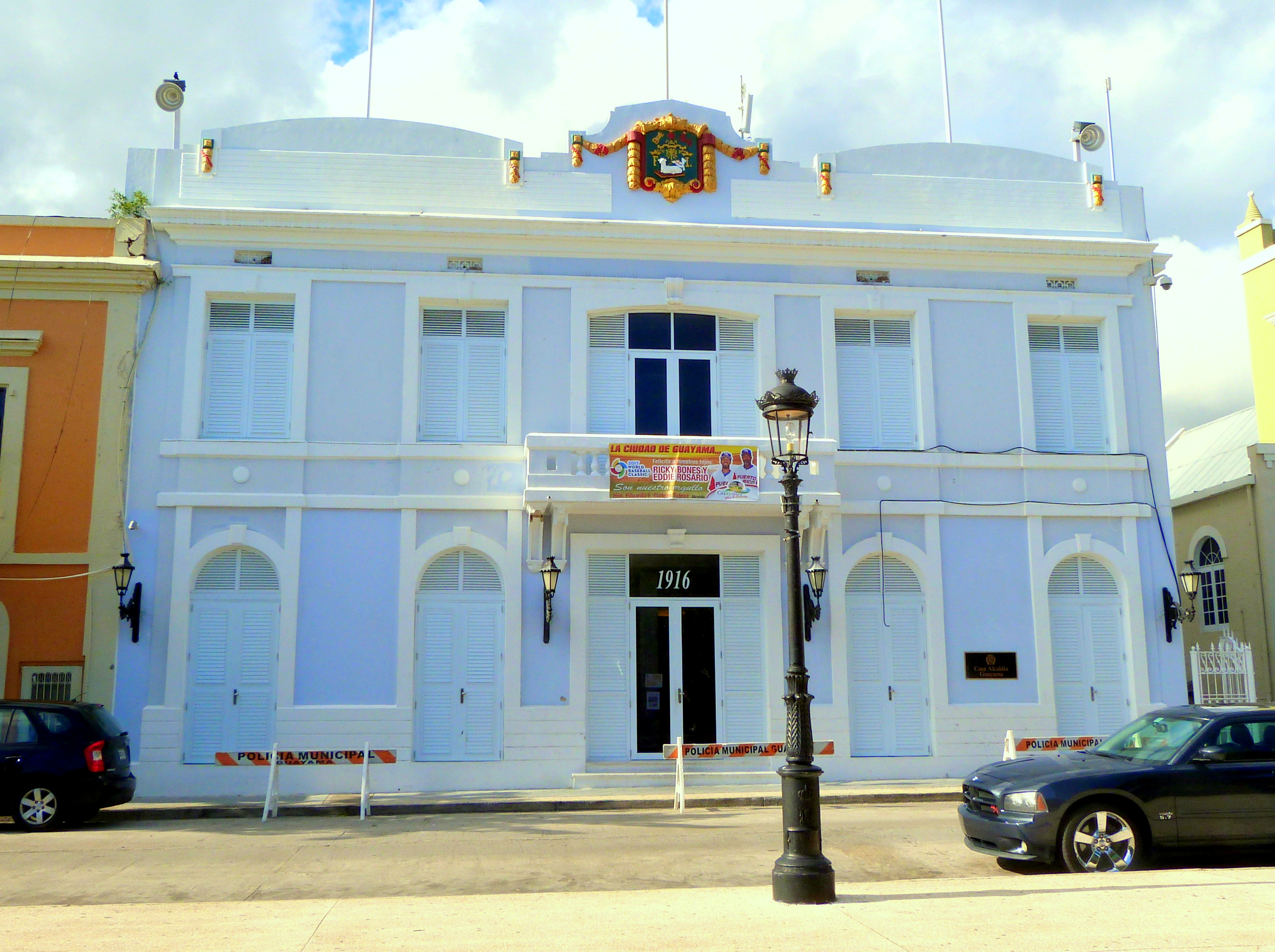
- City Hall in Guayama

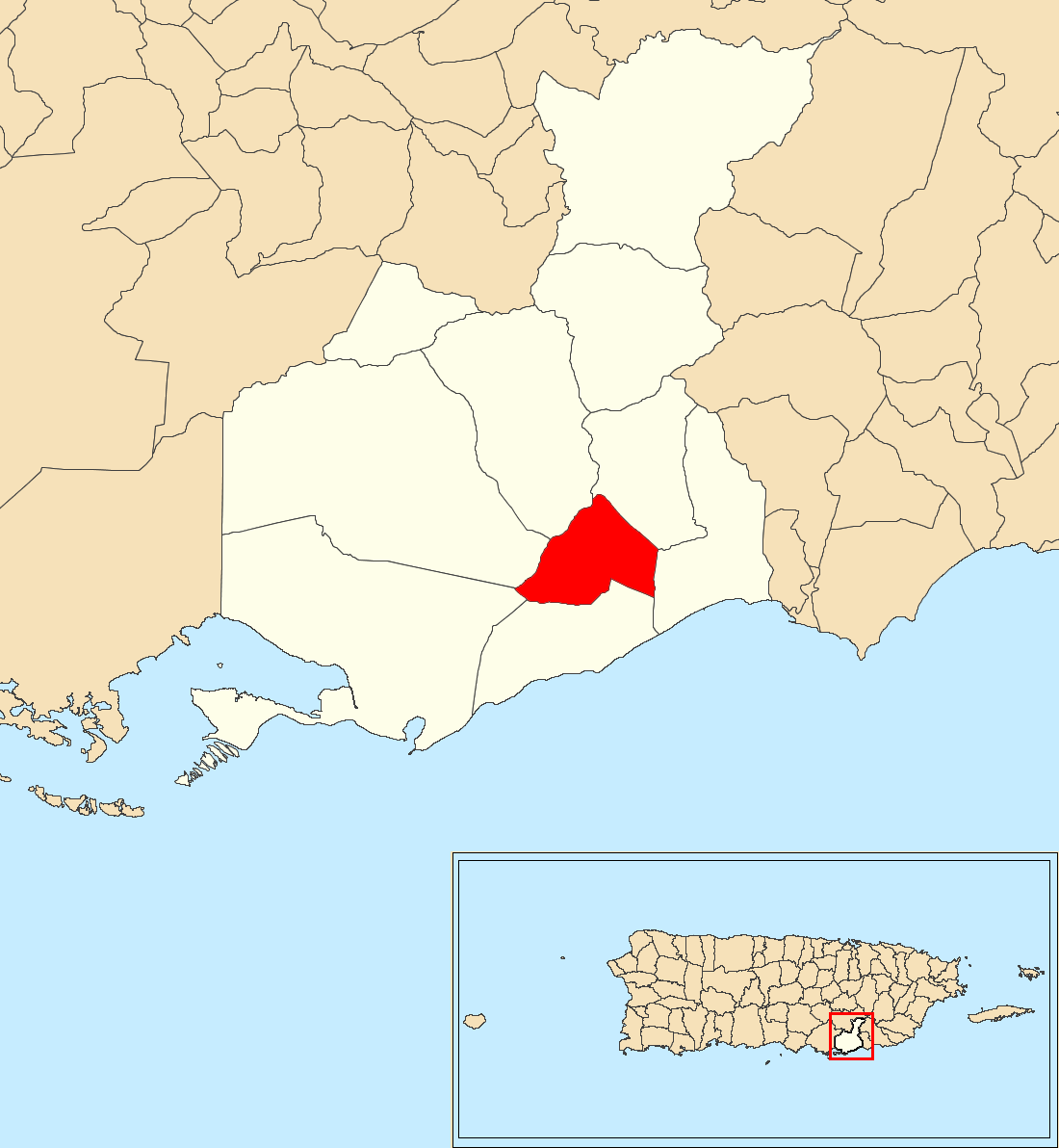
- Location of Guayama barrio-pueblo within the municipality of Guayama shown in red

- Location of Puerto Rico
- Coordinates: 17°58′36″N 66°06′51″W
- Commonwealth: Puerto Rico
- Municipality: Guayama

Area
  - Total: 2.47 sq mi (6.4 km^{2})
  - Land: 2.46 sq mi (6.4 km^{2})
  - Water: 0.01 sq mi (0.026 km^{2})
- Elevation: 128 ft (39 m)

Population (2010)
  - Total: 16,891
  - Density: 6,866.3/sq mi (2,651.1/km^{2})
- Source: 2010 Census
- Time zone: UTC−4 (AST)
- ZIP Code: 00784

Guayama barrio-pueblo is a barrio and the administrative center (seat) of Guayama, a municipality of Puerto Rico. Its population in 2010 was 16,891.

As was customary in Spain, in Puerto Rico, the municipality has a barrio called pueblo which contains a central plaza, the municipal buildings (city hall), and a Catholic church. Fiestas patronales (patron saint festivals) are held in the central plaza every year. The historic downtown area (pueblo) of Guayama was added to the Puerto Rico Register of Historic Sites and Zones (Spanish: Registro Nacional de Sitios y Zonas Históricas) in 1992.

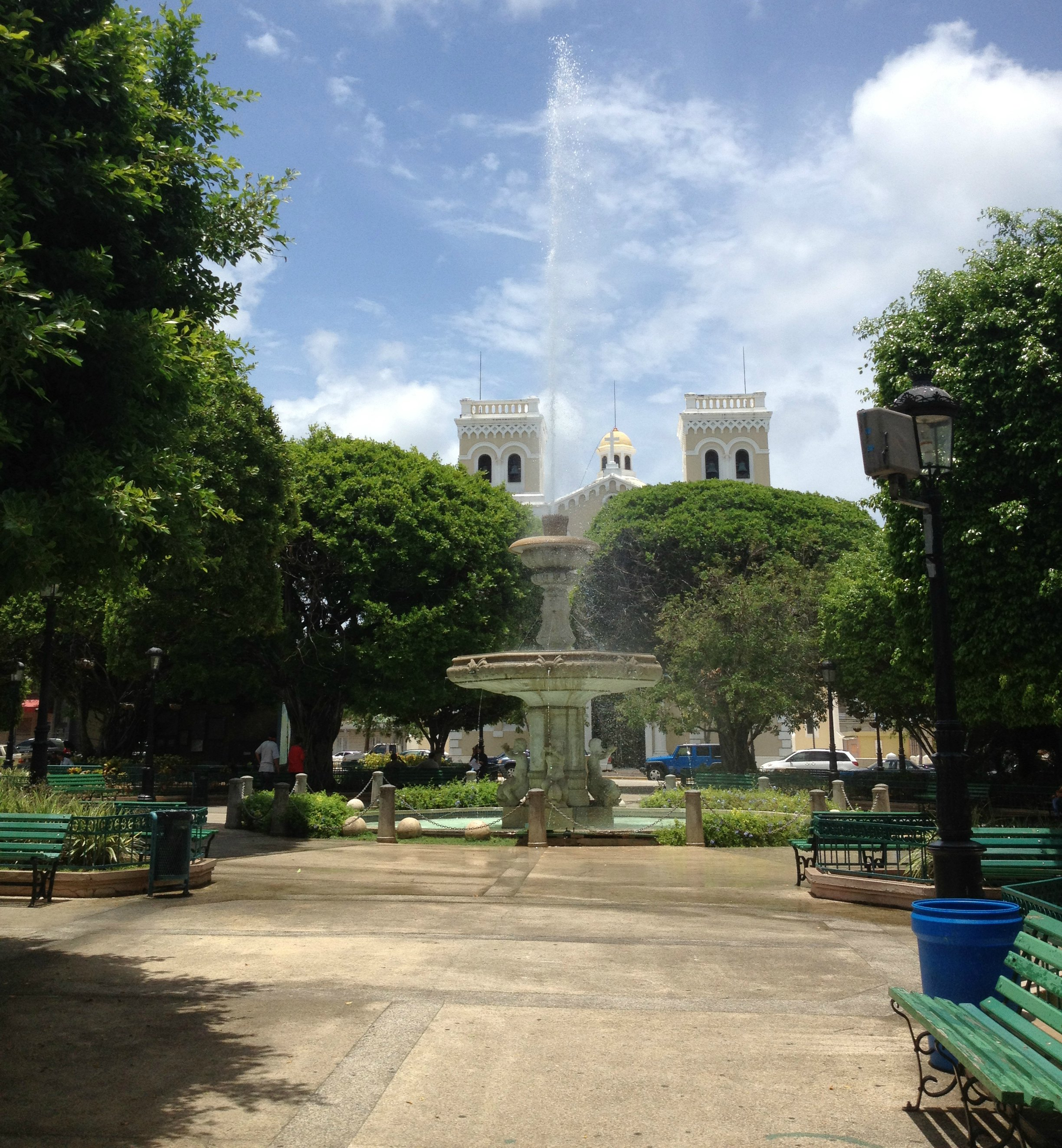
Plaza Colón in Guayama barrio-pueblo

== History ==
Guayama barrio-pueblo was in Spain's gazetteers until Puerto Rico was ceded by Spain in the aftermath of the Spanish–American War under the terms of the Treaty of Paris of 1898 and became an unincorporated territory of the United States. In 1899, the United States Department of War conducted a census of Puerto Rico finding that the population of Guayama Pueblo was 5,334.

Historical population
Census	Pop.	Note	%±
1900	5,334		—
1910	8,321		56.0%
1920	8,924		7.2%
1930	10,953		22.7%
1940	16,913		54.4%
1950	19,408		14.8%
1960	19,183		−1.2%
1970	0		−100.0%
1980	18,488		—
1990	18,022		−2.5%
2000	17,111		−5.1%
2010	16,891		−1.3%
U.S. Decennial Census; 1899 (shown as 1900) 1910-1930; 1930-1950 1980-2000 2010

== The central plaza and its church ==
The central plaza (plaza de recreo) is a place for official and unofficial recreational events and a place where people can gather and socialize from dusk to dawn. The Laws of the Indies, Spanish law, which regulated life in Puerto Rico in the early 19th century, stated the plaza's purpose was for "parties" (celebrations, festivities, festivals) ("a propósito para las fiestas"), and that the square should be proportionally large enough for the number of neighbors ("grandeza proporcionada al número de vecinos"). These Spanish regulations also stated that nearby streets should be comfortable portals for passersby, protecting them from the elements: sun and rain.

The Guayama patron saint festival, in honor of Saint Anthony of Padua, is celebrated at the Plaza de recreo Cristóbal Colón in Guayama barrio-pueblo every June.

Located across from the central plaza in Guayama barrio-pueblo is Iglesia de San Antonio de Padua, or the Parroquia San Antonio de Padua (English: Anthony of Padua Parish), a Roman Catholic church. A hermitage built in the area was in ruins by 1823. The first church after that was inaugurated in 1872. Parts of the church were destroyed by the 1899 San Ciriaco hurricane. In the 1920s the church underwent reconstruction.

== Gallery ==
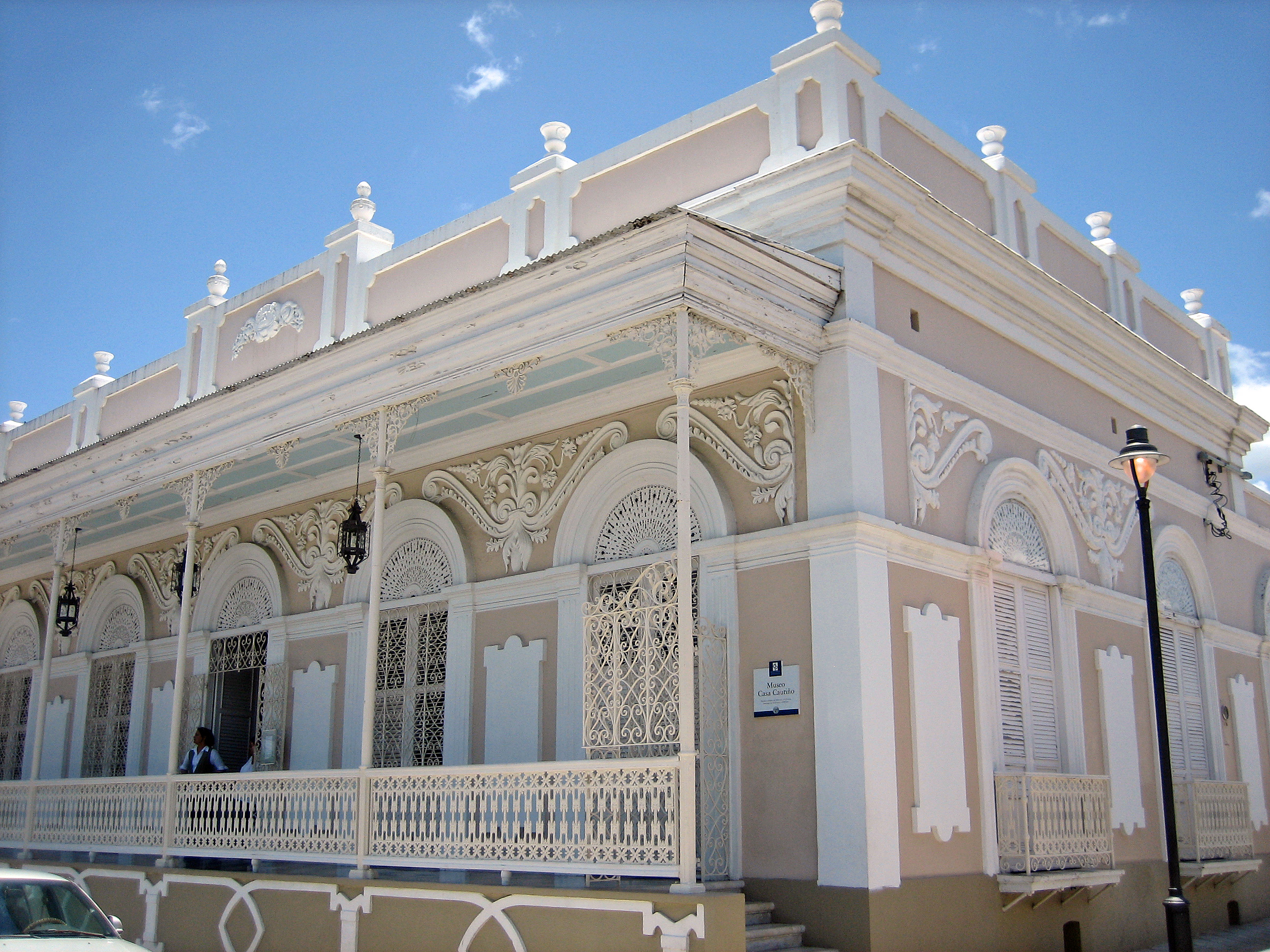
Casa Cautiño - Historic place

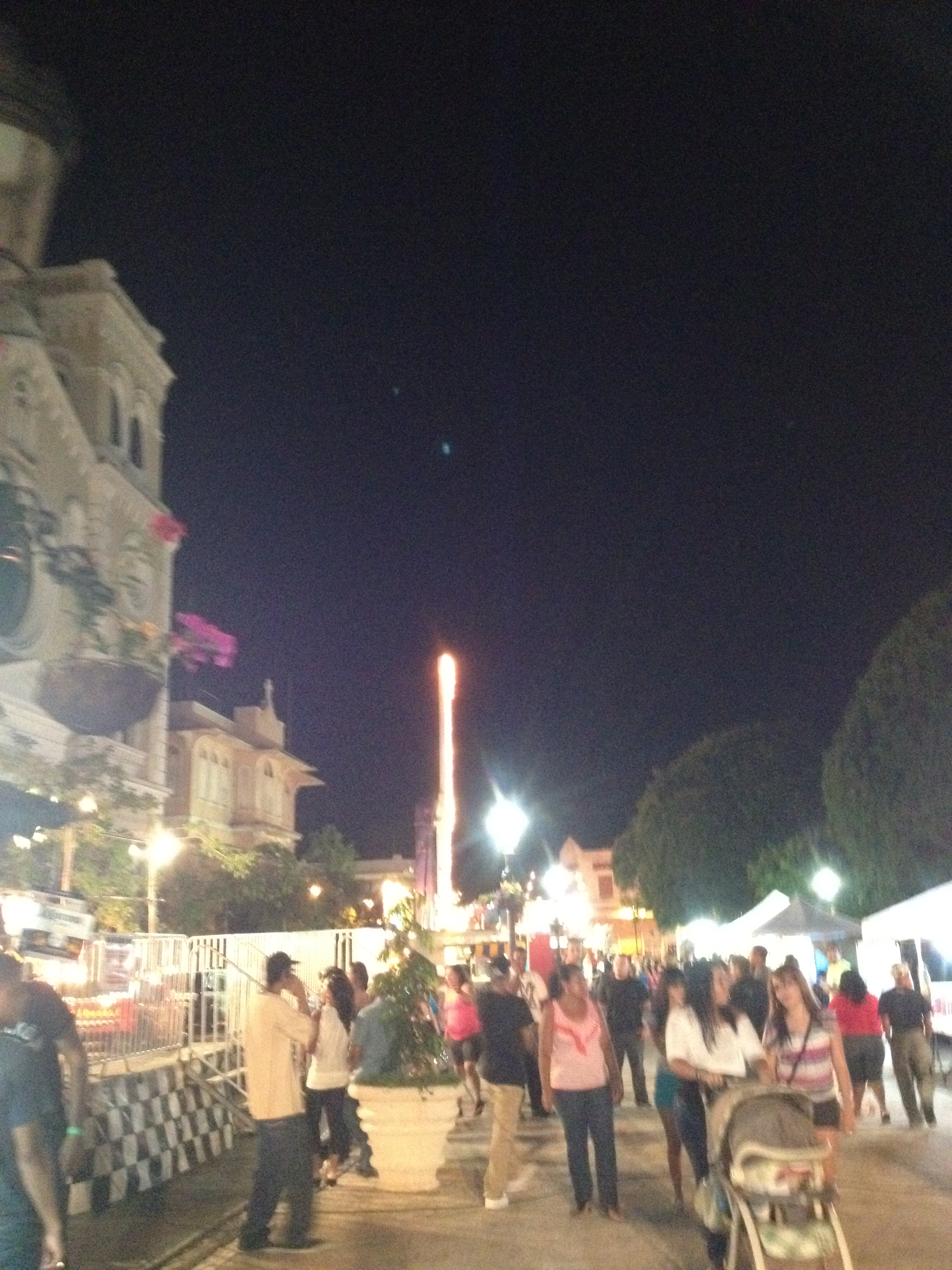
Patron saint festival at the central plaza, June 2012

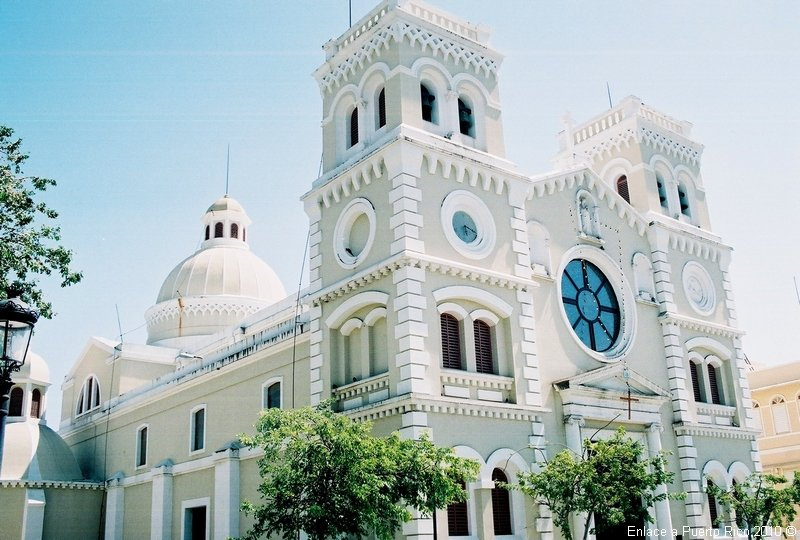
San Antonio de Padua Parish in Guayama

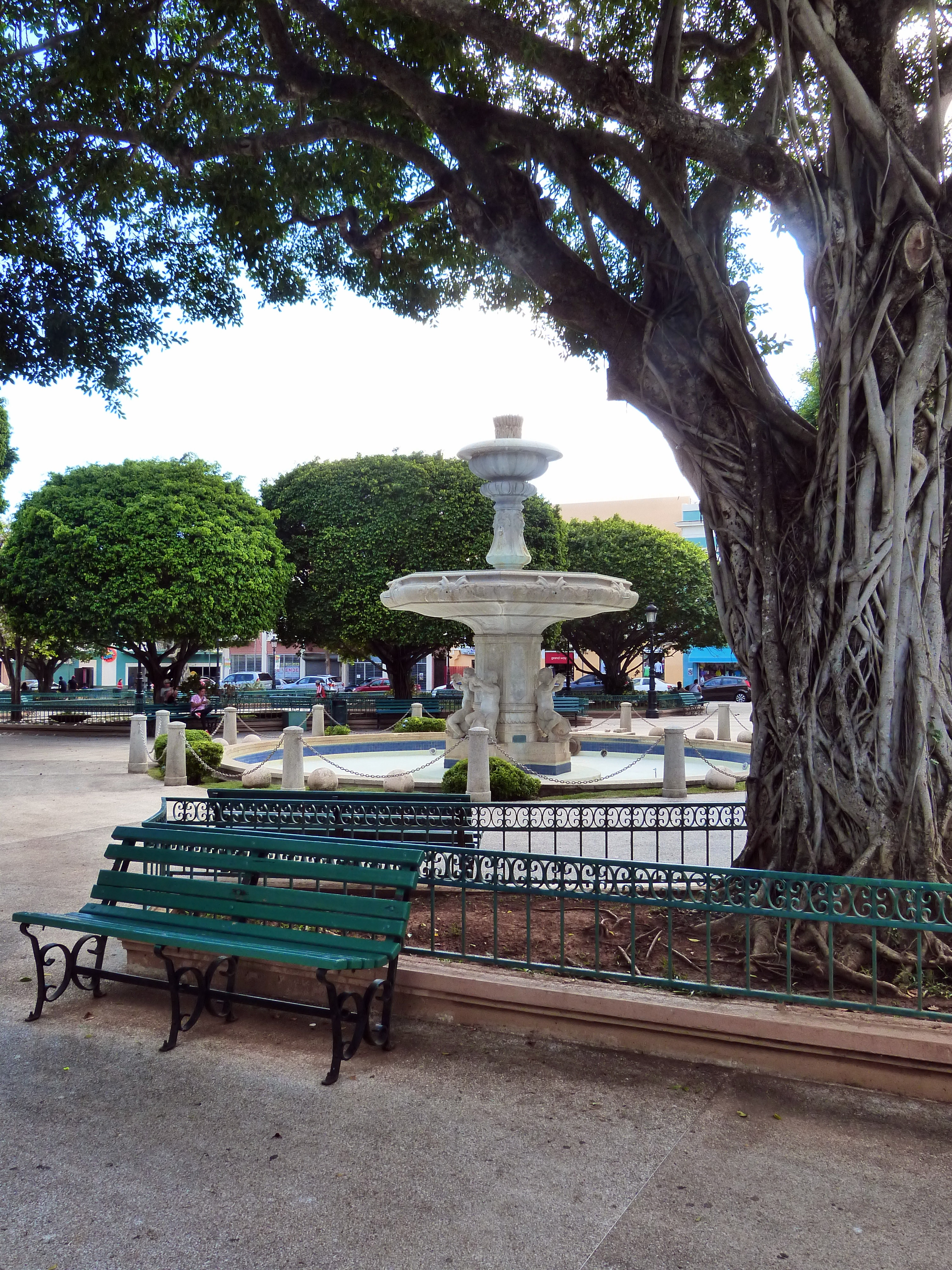
Plaza de recreo Cristóbal Colón

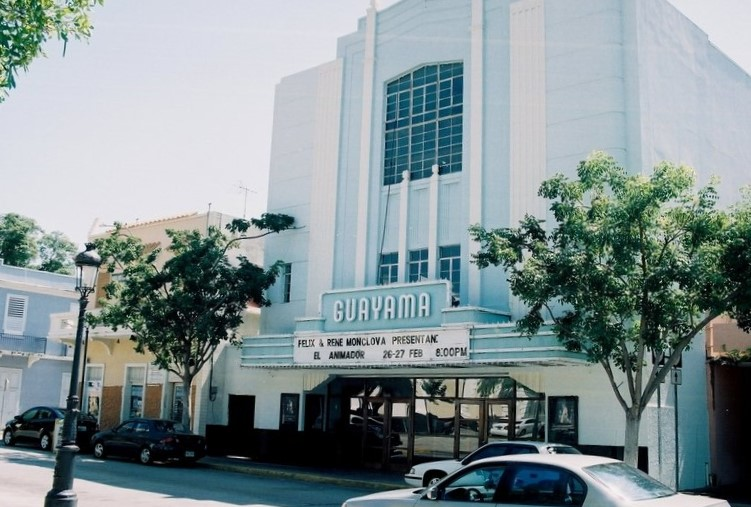
Teatro de Guayama

== See also ==
- List of communities in Puerto Rico
