= Augusto Valentín Vizcarrondo =

Puerto Rican politician

Augusto Valentín Vizcarrondo was a Puerto Rican politician who served as mayor of Mayagüez from 1953 to 1956. He was also known as Tuto Valentín.
