= Machete, Guayama, Puerto Rico =

Barrio of Puerto Rico

Machete
- Barrio
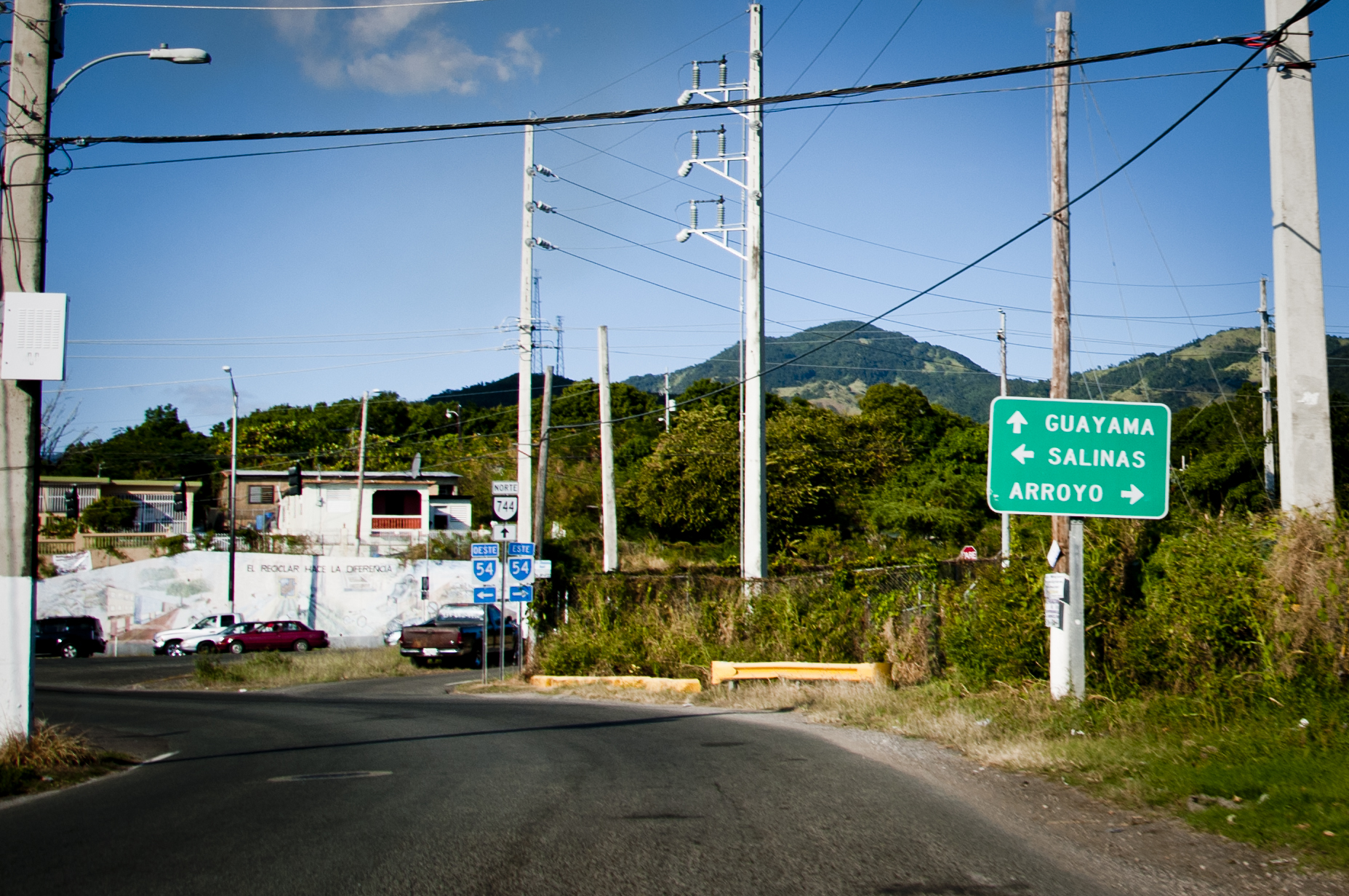
- Near Highway 54 junction in Machete

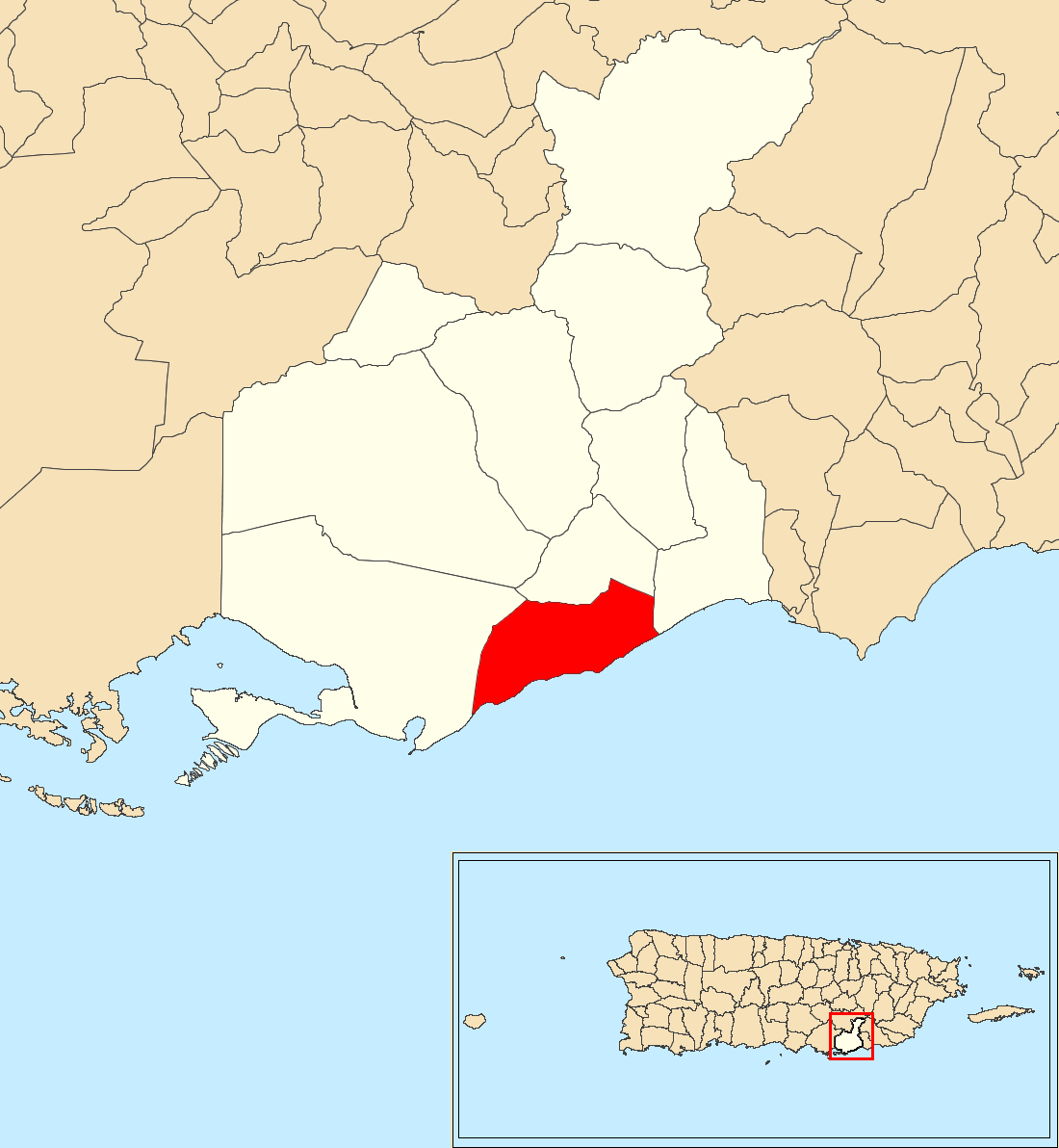
- Location of Machete within the municipality of Guayama shown in red

- Location of Puerto Rico
- Coordinates: 17°57′15″N 66°07′18″W
- Commonwealth: Puerto Rico
- Municipality: Guayama

Area
  - Total: 4.04 sq mi (10.5 km^{2})
  - Land: 3.51 sq mi (9.1 km^{2})
  - Water: 0.53 sq mi (1.4 km^{2})
- Elevation: 52 ft (16 m)

Population (2010)
  - Total: 3,846
  - Density: 1,095.7/sq mi (423.1/km^{2})
- Source: 2010 Census
- Time zone: UTC−4 (AST)
- ZIP Code: 00784

Machete is a barrio in the municipality of Guayama, Puerto Rico. Its population in 2010 was 3,846.

== History ==
In 1770, Machete was part of the territory presided over by caciques Güamaní and Guayama. In the 19th century it became an important sugar producer.

Machete was in Spain's gazetteers until Puerto Rico was ceded by Spain in the aftermath of the Spanish–American War under the terms of the Treaty of Paris of 1898 and became an unincorporated territory of the United States. In 1899, the United States Department of War conducted a census of Puerto Rico finding that the population of Machete barrio was 368.

Historical population
Census	Pop.	Note	%±
1900	368		—
1910	594		61.4%
1920	1,028		73.1%
1930	1,075		4.6%
1940	1,302		21.1%
1950	994		−23.7%
1960	306		−69.2%
1970	373		21.9%
1980	748		100.5%
1990	902		20.6%
2000	2,509		178.2%
2010	3,846		53.3%
U.S. Decennial Census; 1899 (shown as 1900) 1910-1930; 1930-1950 1980-2000 2010

== Gallery ==
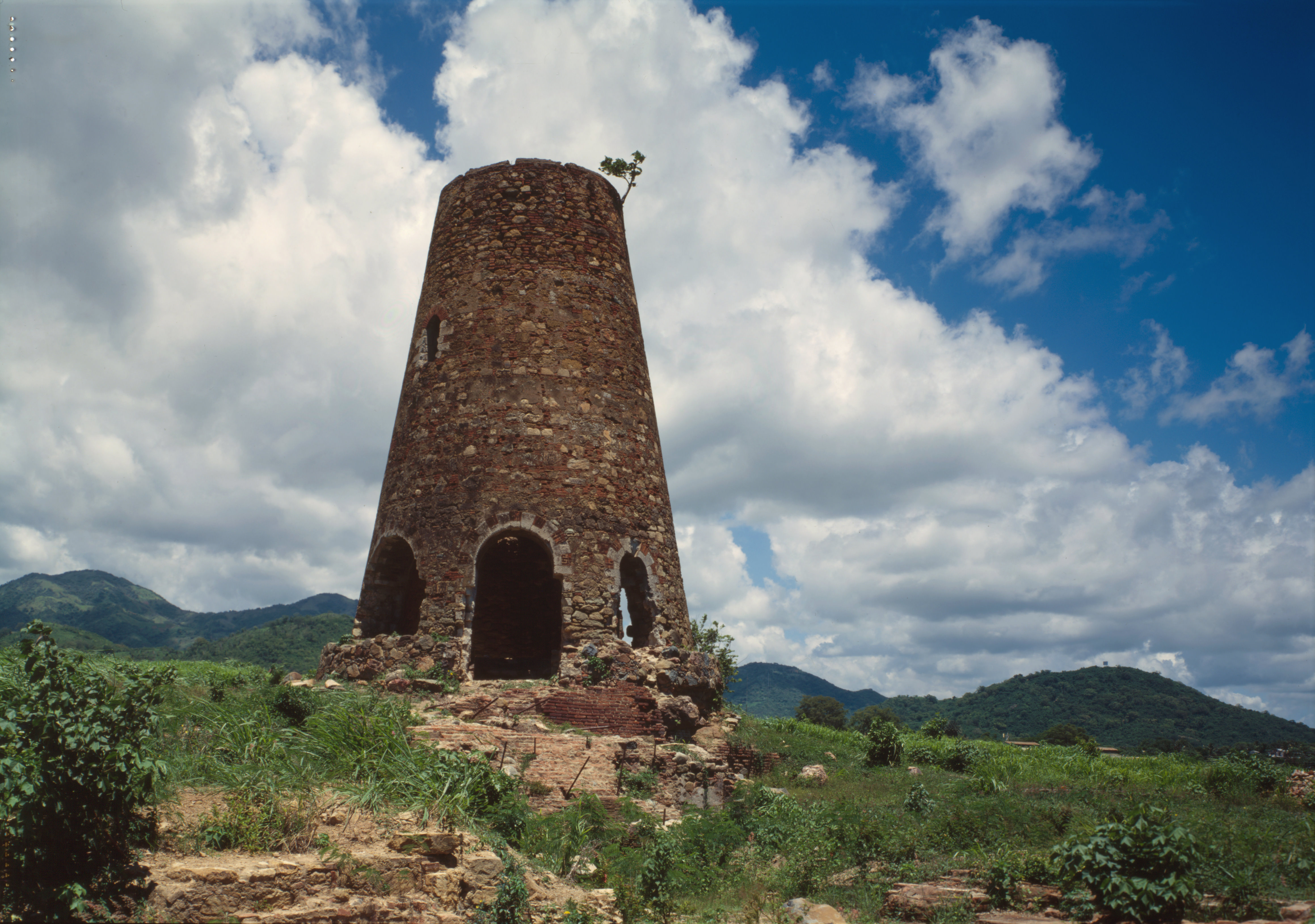
Hacienda Azucarera Vives in Machete

== See also ==
- List of communities in Puerto Rico
