= Puerto Rico Highway 15 =

Highway in Puerto Rico

Highway 15
- Ruta 15

Route information
- Maintained by Puerto Rico DTPW
- Length: 25.80 km (16.03 mi)
- Existed: 1953–present

Major junctions
- South end: PR-3 in Guayama barrio-pueblo
- PR-179 in Caimital; PR-712 in Palmas; PR-708 in Jájome Alto; PR-741 in Jájome Alto–Culebras Bajo; PR-7737 in Culebras Bajo; PR-7715 in Quebrada Arriba–Monte Llano; PR-1 in Monte Llano–Quebrada Arriba–Cayey barrio-pueblo
- North end: PR-14 in Cayey barrio-pueblo

Location
- Country: United States
- Territory: Puerto Rico
- Municipalities: Guayama, Cayey

Highway system
- Roads in Puerto Rico; List
← PR-14	→ PR-16
- Carretera #4
- U.S. National Register of Historic Places
- Location within Puerto Rico
- Location: Cayey and Guayama
- Coordinates: 18°01′48″N 66°03′53″W
- Built: 19th-century
- NRHP reference No.: 100005741
- Added to NRHP: October 30, 2020

Puerto Rico Highway 15 (PR-15), formerly Road No. 4 (Carretera #4), is a main highway connecting the municipalities of Guayama and Cayey in Puerto Rico. With a length of 25.80 km (16.03 mi), it extends from PR-3 in downtown Guayama to PR-14 in downtown Cayey.

== Route description ==
This highway consists of one lane in each direction for most of its length due to its rural characteristics. In Guayama, PR-15 begins at PR-3 junction in the city center. Then, it leaves the urban area and heads to the north, where meets with PR-179 and crosses the Río Guamaní via the Cayey Bridge before climbing the Sierra de Cayey mountains. In this municipality, PR-15 makes its way through Caimital, Palmas and Guamaní barrios before entering Cayey.

In Cayey, PR-15 makes its way through Jájome Alto barrio after crossing the Guayama municipal limit in the Sierra de Cayey. From this point, the highway continues to the north towards the urban area. Between Jájome Alto and Culebras Bajo barrios, PR-15 meets with the Ruta Panorámica, of which is part from PR-741 intersection to PR-7737 junction. After that, the road goes down the mountains through Quebrada Arriba and Monte Llano barrios until its junction with PR-1, where PR-15 enters the city center for make its final length until PR-14 intersection.

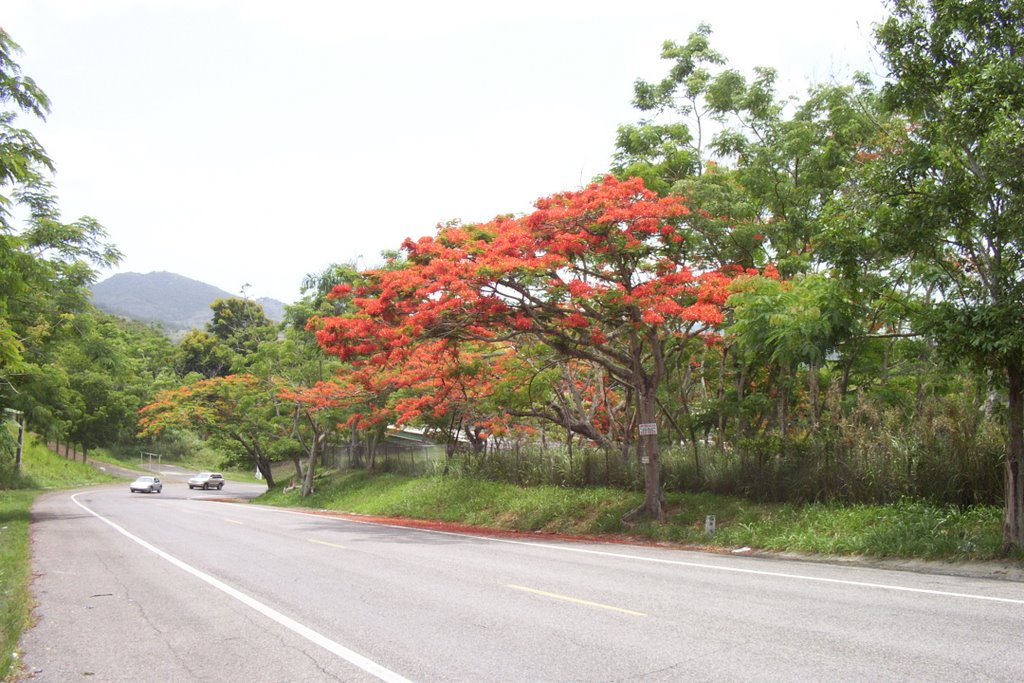
Flamboyant on PR-15 in Cayey

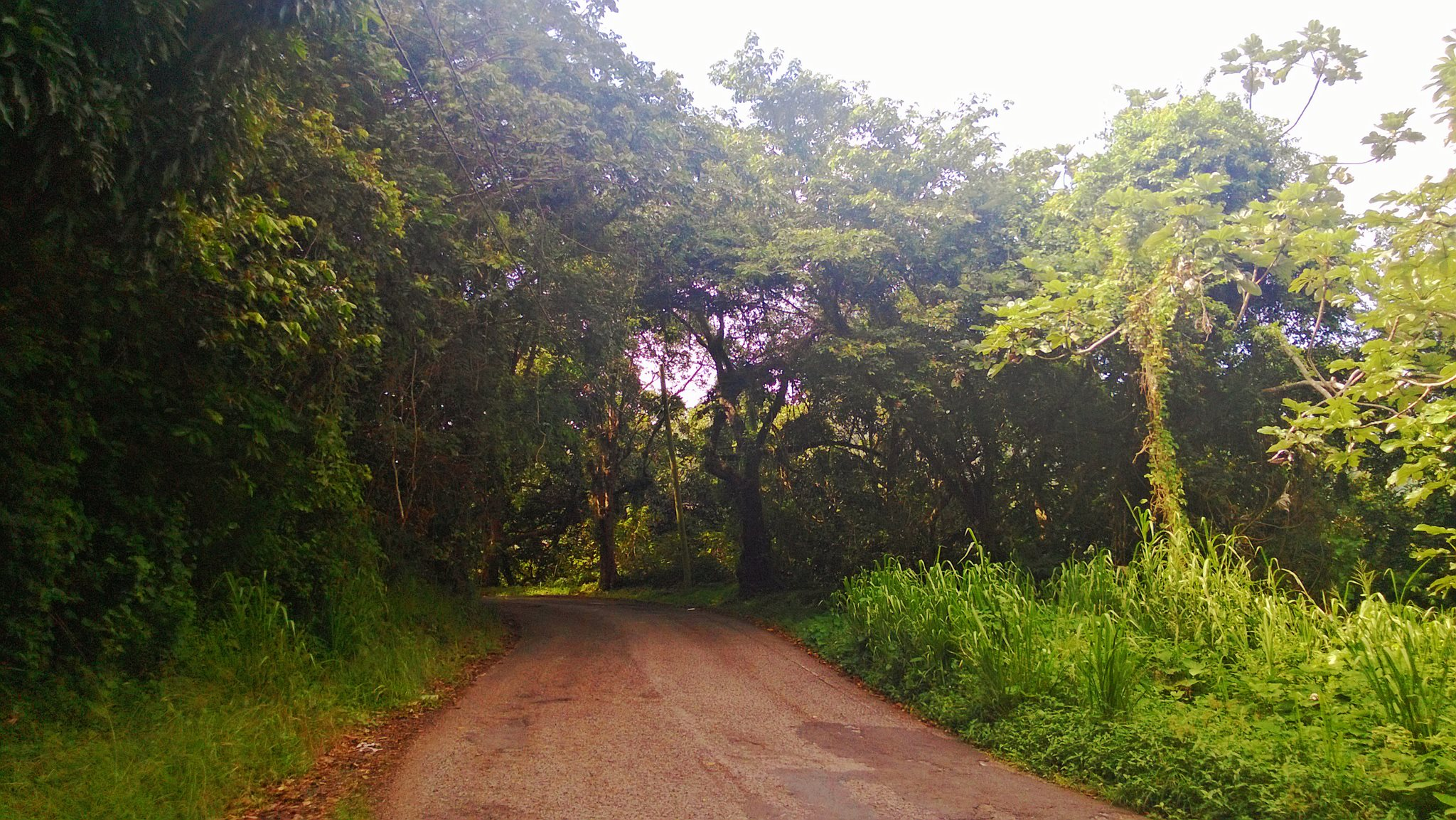
PR-15 in Guayama, heading north

== History ==
Originally, PR-15 was identified as Road No. 4, a spur route of the Carretera Central from Cayey to Guayama. As Road No. 4, Puerto Rico Highway 15 was built between 1886 and 1897, and changed its number to the current designation after the 1953 Puerto Rico highway renumbering, a process implemented by the Puerto Rico Department of Transportation and Public Works (Spanish: Departamento de Transportación y Obras Públicas) that increased the insular highway network to connect existing routes with different locations around Puerto Rico. The entire length of PR-15 was listed on the National Register of Historic Places in 2020.

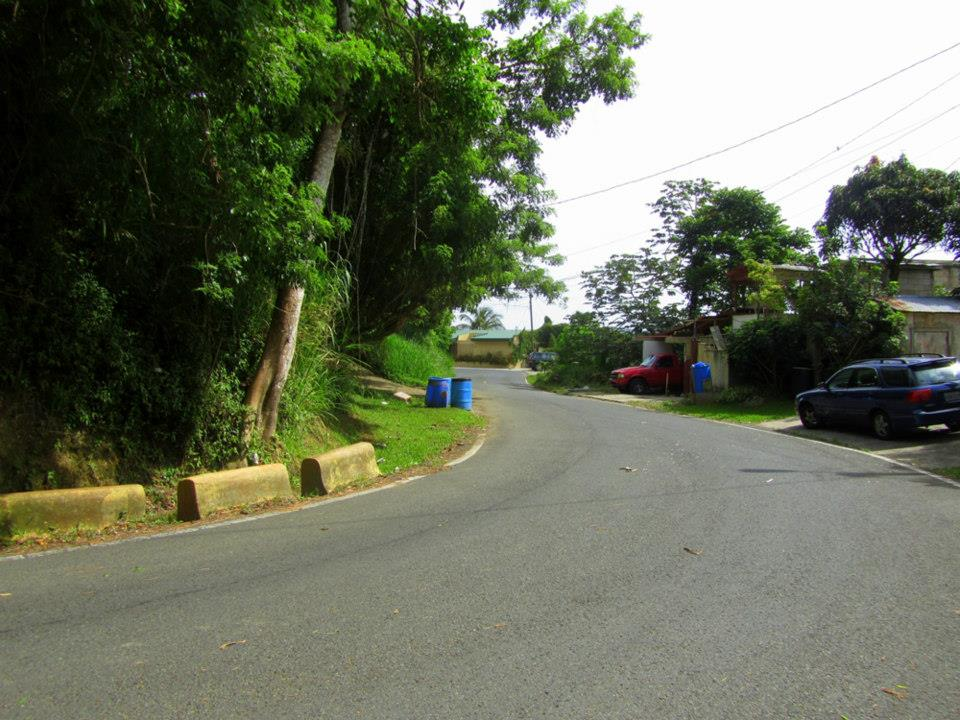
PR-15 in Cayey, heading south

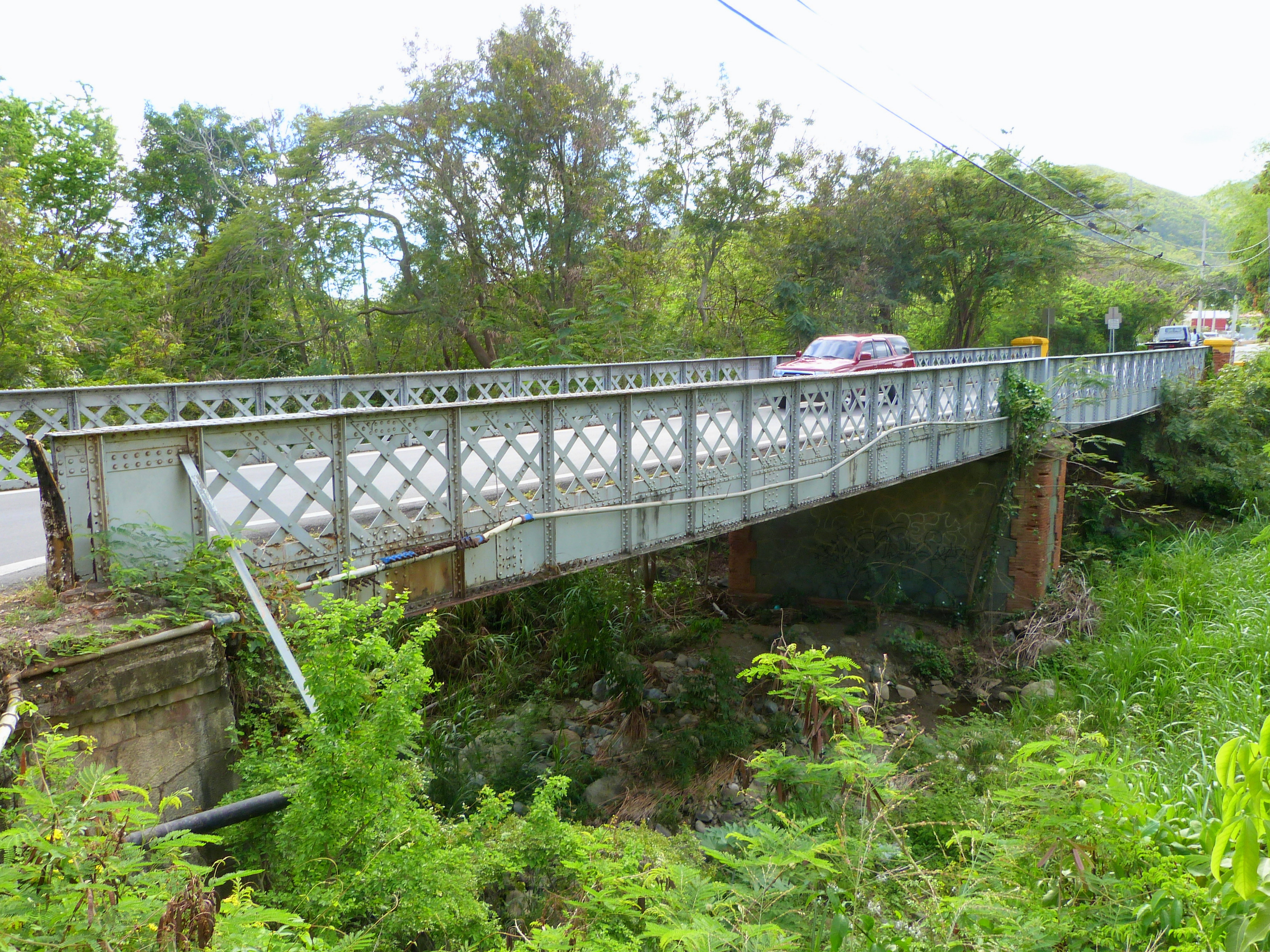
Cayey Bridge over the Guamaní River in Guayama

== Major intersections ==
Municipality	Location	km	mi	Destinations	Notes
Guayama	Guayama barrio-pueblo	0.0	0.0	PR-3 – Guayama	Southern terminus of PR-15
Guayama	Caimital	1.6– 1.7	0.99– 1.1	PR-179 to PR-748 – Guamaní, Carite	
Guayama	Río Guamaní	1.7	1.1	Puente de Cayey	
Guayama	Palmas	1.8	1.1	To PR-54 / PR-Conector Dulces Sueños – Pozo Hondo	
Guayama	Palmas	6.4– 6.5	4.0– 4.0	PR-712 – Carmen	
Cayey	Jájome Alto	13.3	8.3	PR-708 – Jájome Bajo	Carretera José Aníbal Díaz Collazo
Cayey	Jájome Alto–Culebras Bajo line	18.5	11.5	PR-741 (Ruta Panorámica) – Culebras Alto	Southern terminus of the Ruta Panorámica concurrency; the Ruta Panorámica continues toward Guayama
Cayey	Culebras Bajo	20.0	12.4	PR-7737 (Ruta Panorámica) – Sumido	Northern terminus of the Ruta Panorámica concurrency; the Ruta Panorámica continues toward Aibonito
Cayey	Quebrada Arriba–Monte Llano line	24.8	15.4	PR-7715 – Cayey	
Cayey	Monte Llano–Quebrada Arriba– Cayey barrio-pueblo tripoint	25.1	15.6	PR-1 – Caguas, Salinas	
Cayey	Cayey barrio-pueblo	25.80	16.03	PR-14 – Cayey, Aibonito	Northern terminus of PR-15
1.000 mi = 1.609 km; 1.000 km = 0.621 mi: Concurrency terminus
