= Puerto Rico Highway 179 =

Highway in Puerto Rico

Highway 179
- Ruta 179

Route information
- Maintained by Puerto Rico DTPW
- Length: 20.2 km (12.6 mi)

Major junctions
- South end: PR-15 in Caimital
- PR-748 in Caimital; PR-764 in Guamaní; PR-747 in Guamaní; PR-746 in Guamaní; PR-742 in Carite
- North end: PR-184 in Guavate

Location
- Country: United States
- Territory: Puerto Rico
- Municipalities: Guayama, Patillas, Cayey

Highway system
- Roads in Puerto Rico; List
← PR-178	→ PR-180

Puerto Rico Highway 179 (PR-179) is a rural road that travels from Guayama to Cayey in Puerto Rico. It goes through Patillas but with no major junctions. This road extends from PR-15 north of downtown Guayama and ends at PR-184 in Farallón.

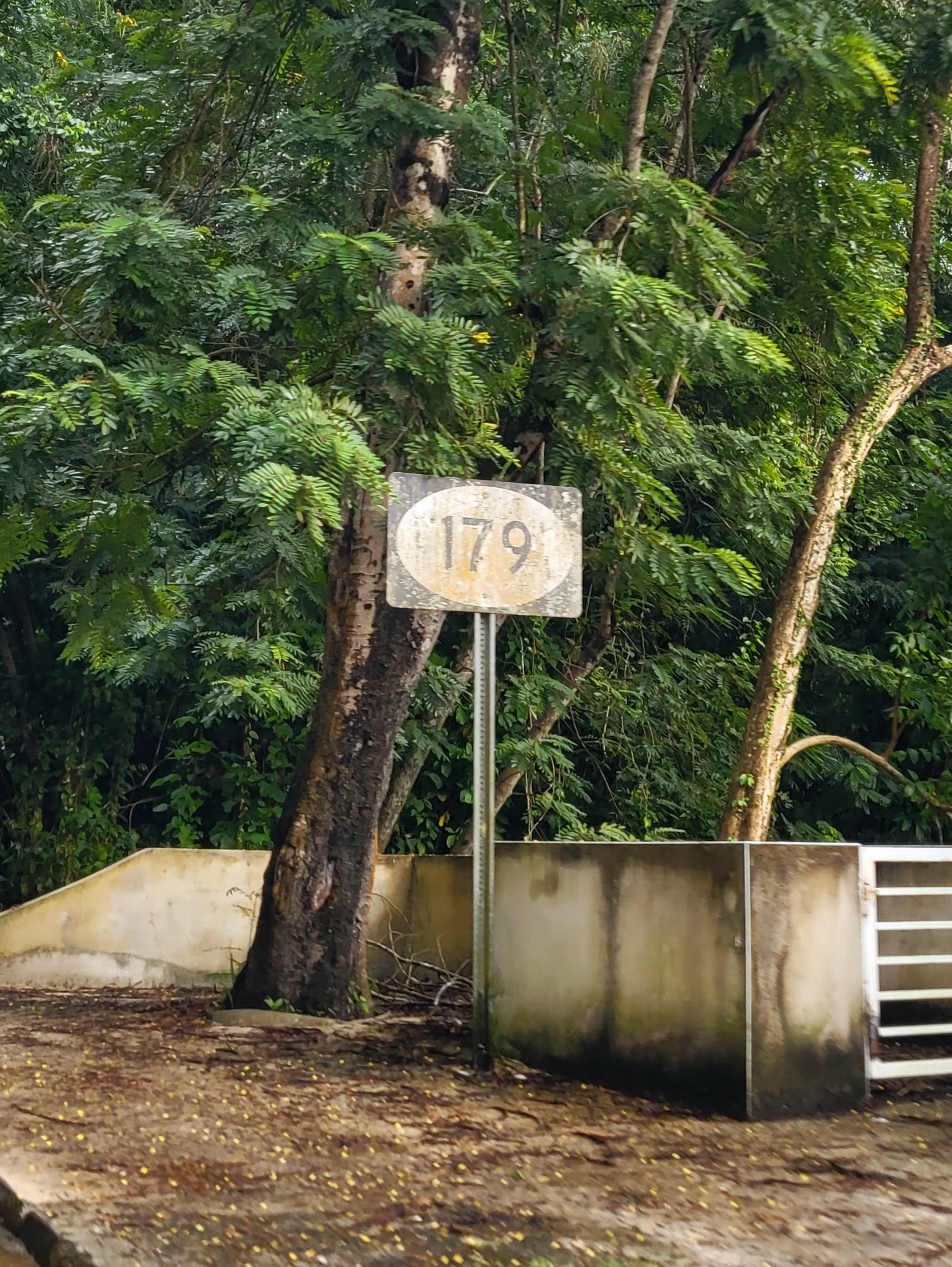
Northbound sign for PR-179 in Guamaní, Guayama

== Major intersections ==
Municipality	Location	km	mi	Destinations	Notes
Guayama	Caimital	0.0	0.0	PR-15 – Guayama, Cayey	Southern terminus of PR-179
Guayama	Caimital	0.1	0.062	PR-748 – Algarrobo	
Guayama	Guamaní	4.0	2.5	PR-764 – Guamaní	
Guayama	Guamaní	4.1	2.5	PR-747 – Guamaní	
Guayama	Guamaní	4.4– 4.5	2.7– 2.8	PR-746 – Guamaní	
Guayama	Carite	9.8	6.1	PR-742 (Ruta Panorámica) – Carite	Southern terminus of the Ruta Panorámica concurrency; the Ruta Panorámica continues toward Cayey
Patillas	No major junctions				
Guayama	No major junctions				
Cayey	Guavate	20.2	12.6	PR-184 – Cayey, Patillas	Northern terminus of PR-179; northern terminus of the Ruta Panorámica concurrency; the Ruta Panorámica continues toward Patillas
1.000 mi = 1.609 km; 1.000 km = 0.621 mi: Concurrency terminus
