= Jájome Alto, Cayey, Puerto Rico =

Barrio of Puerto Rico

Jájome Alto
- Barrio
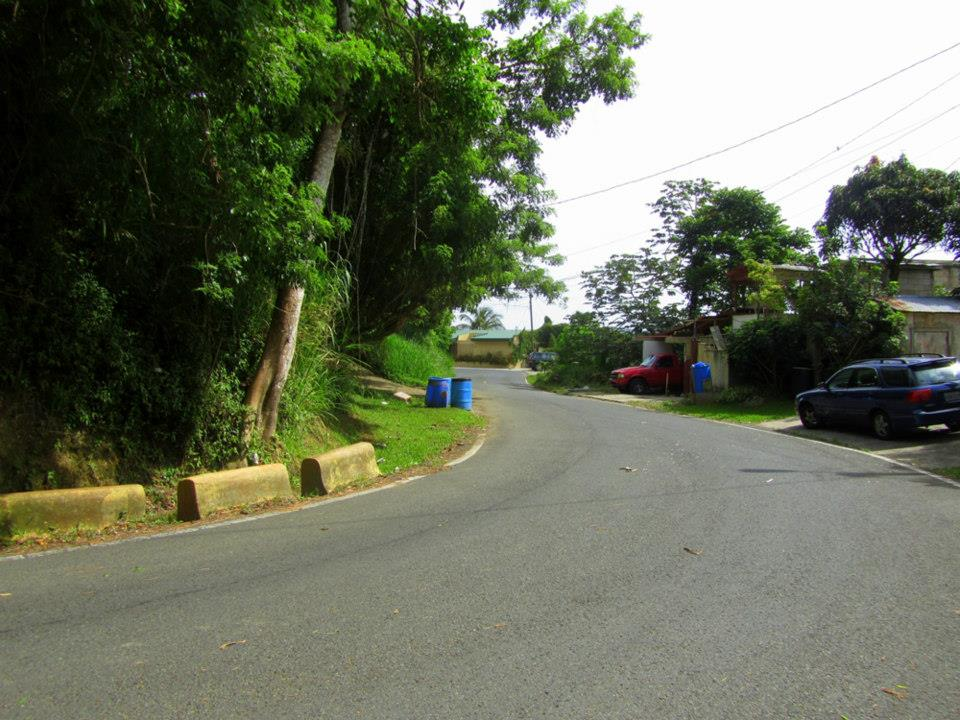
- Puerto Rico Highway 15 in Jájome Alto

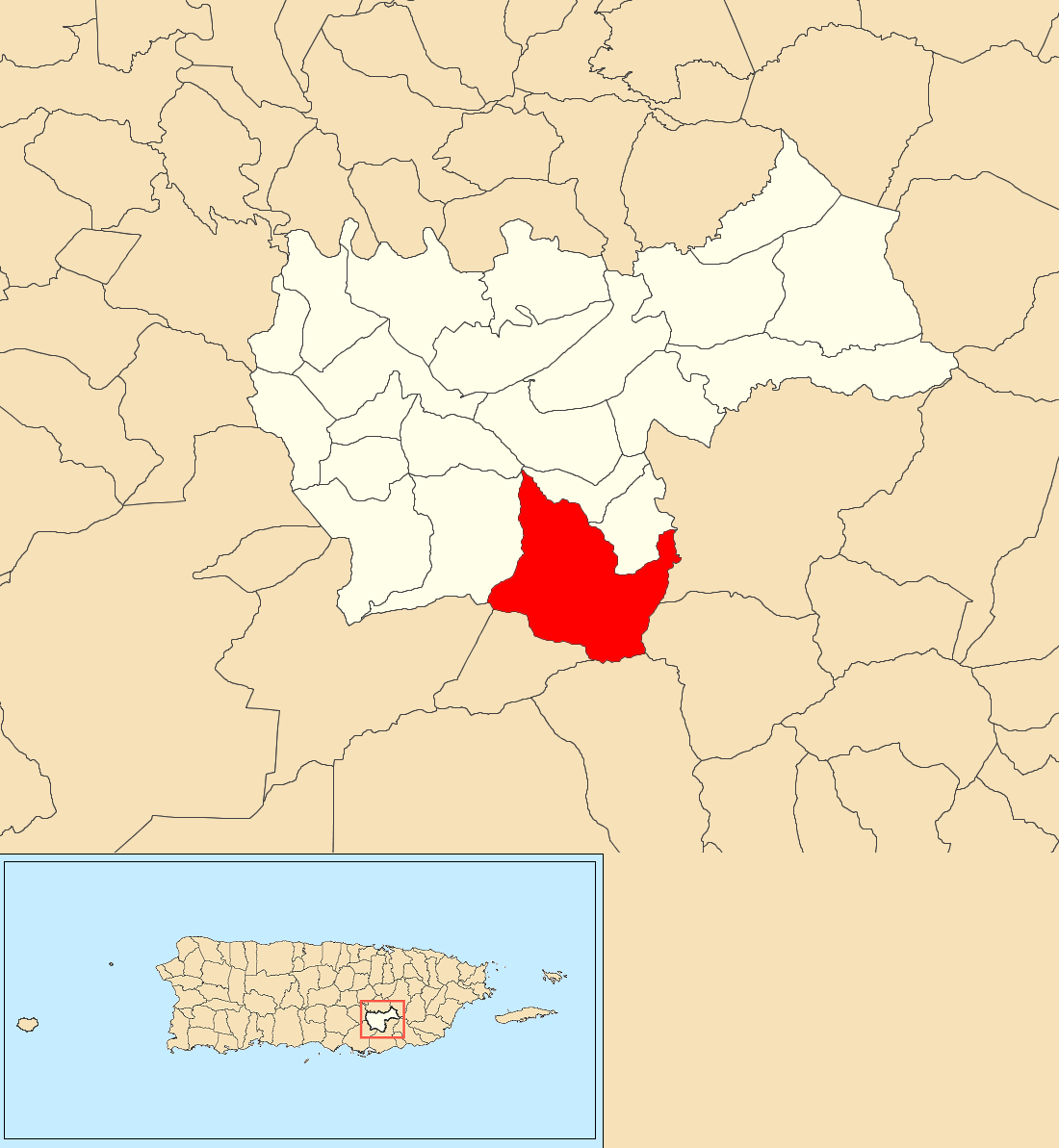
- Location of Jájome Alto within the municipality of Cayey shown in red

- Location of Puerto Rico
- Coordinates: 18°03′26″N 66°08′41″W
- Commonwealth: Puerto Rico
- Municipality: Cayey

Area
  - Total: 4.96 sq mi (12.8 km^{2})
  - Land: 4.96 sq mi (12.8 km^{2})
  - Water: 0 sq mi (0 km^{2})
- Elevation: 1,489 ft (454 m)

Population (2010)
  - Total: 641
  - Density: 129.2/sq mi (49.9/km^{2})
- Source: 2010 Census
- Time zone: UTC−4 (AST)

Jájome Alto is a barrio in the municipality of Cayey, Puerto Rico. Its population in 2010 was 641.

== History ==
Jájome Alto was in Spain's gazetteers until Puerto Rico was ceded by Spain in the aftermath of the Spanish–American War under the terms of the Treaty of Paris of 1898 and became an unincorporated territory of the United States. In 1899, the United States Department of War conducted a census of Puerto Rico finding that the population of Jájome Alto barrio was 1,246.

Historical population
Census	Pop.	Note	%±
1900	1,246		—
1910	1,201		−3.6%
1920	1,442		20.1%
1930	1,591		10.3%
1940	1,235		−22.4%
1950	1,221		−1.1%
1960	943		−22.8%
1970	727		−22.9%
1980	545		−25.0%
1990	681		25.0%
2000	654		−4.0%
2010	641		−2.0%
2020	399		−37.8%
U.S. Decennial Census; 1899 (shown as 1900) 1910-1930; 1930-1950 1980-2000 2010 2020

== See also ==
- List of communities in Puerto Rico
