= Cayey Bridge =

Historic bridge in Guayama municipality, Puerto Rico

- U.S. National Register of Historic Places
- Puerto Rico Historic Sites and Zones
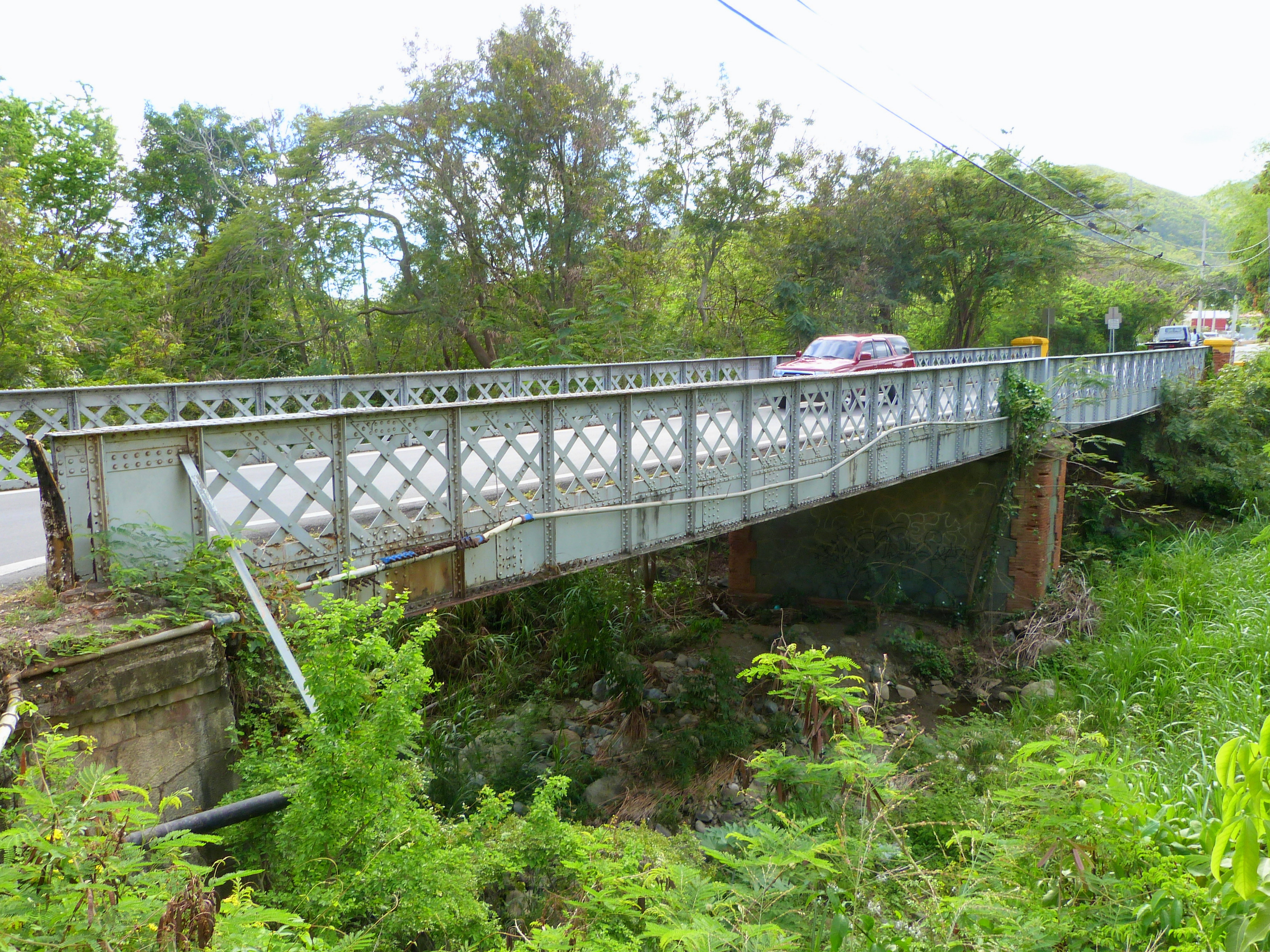
- Bridge in 2017

- Location within Puerto Rico
- Nearest city: Guayama, Puerto Rico
- Coordinates: 18°0′9″N 66°6′55″W
- Area: less than one acre
- Built: 1891
- Built by: Nicrisse & Decluve
- Architectural style: iron lateral lattice girder
- MPS: Historic Bridges of Puerto Rico MPS
- NRHP reference No.: 95000845
- RNSZH No.: 2001-(RS)-23-JP-SH

Significant dates
- Added to NRHP: July 19, 1995
- Designated RNSZH: May 16, 2001

The Cayey Bridge, also known as Puente de Cayey, is an iron lateral lattice girder bridge in Puerto Rico that was built in 1891. It brings Puerto Rico Highway 15 over the Guamaní River. Despite its name, its actually closer to the city of Guayama and not Cayey.

It is an extremely rare example of such a bridge in the United States or its territories. Puerto Rico has the only bridges in the United States, or its territories, built with this technology.

The bridge was fabricated by the Belgian firm Nicrisse & Decluve. The girder bridge has two independent spans.

It was listed on the National Register of Historic Places in 1995 and on the Puerto Rico Register of Historic Sites and Zones in 2000.

== Gallery ==
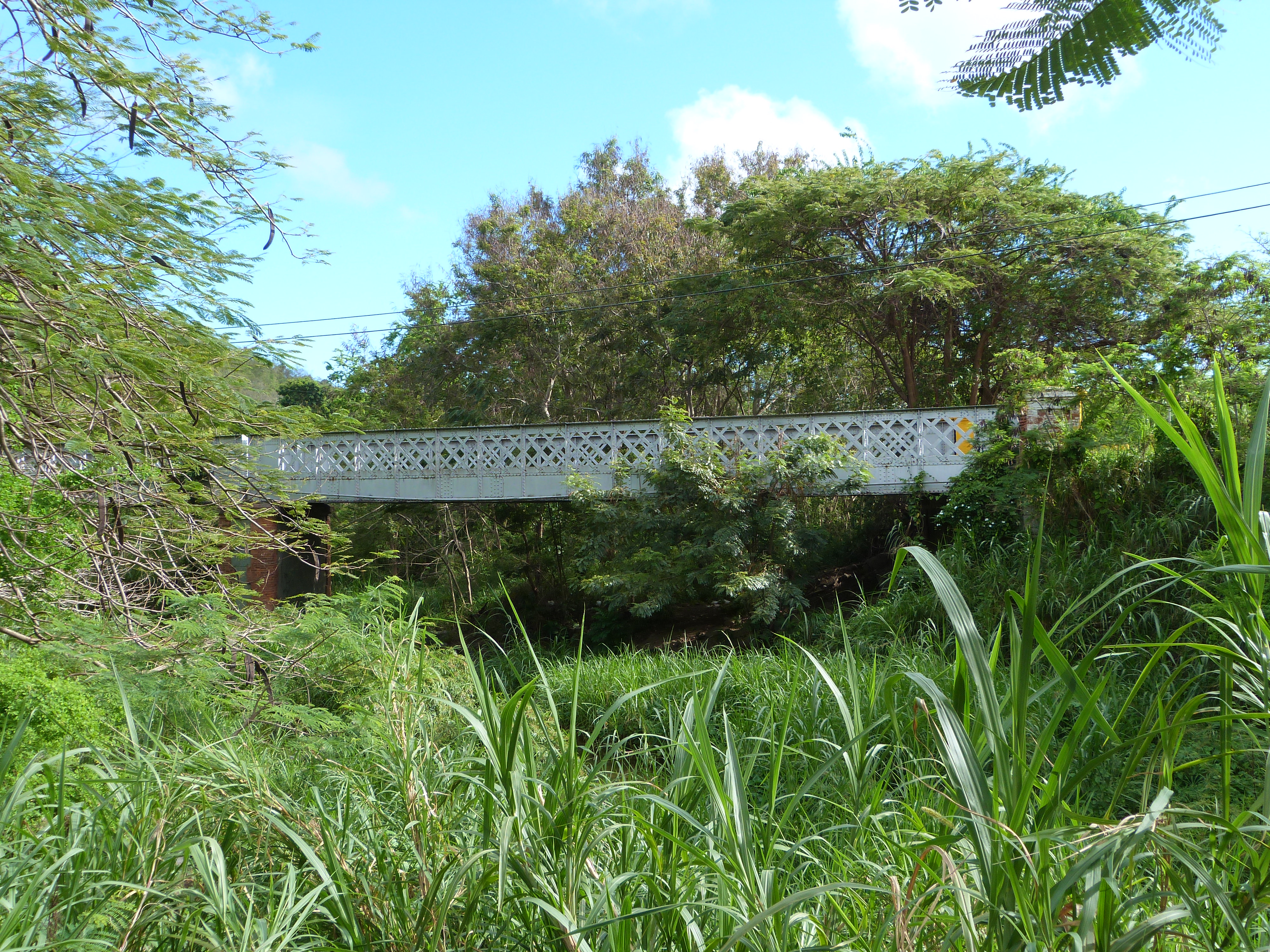
Cayey Bridge

== See also ==
- Arenas Bridge, another Nicaise et Delcuve bridge in Puerto Rico.
