= Guamaní =

Barrio of Guayama, Puerto Rico

- Barrio
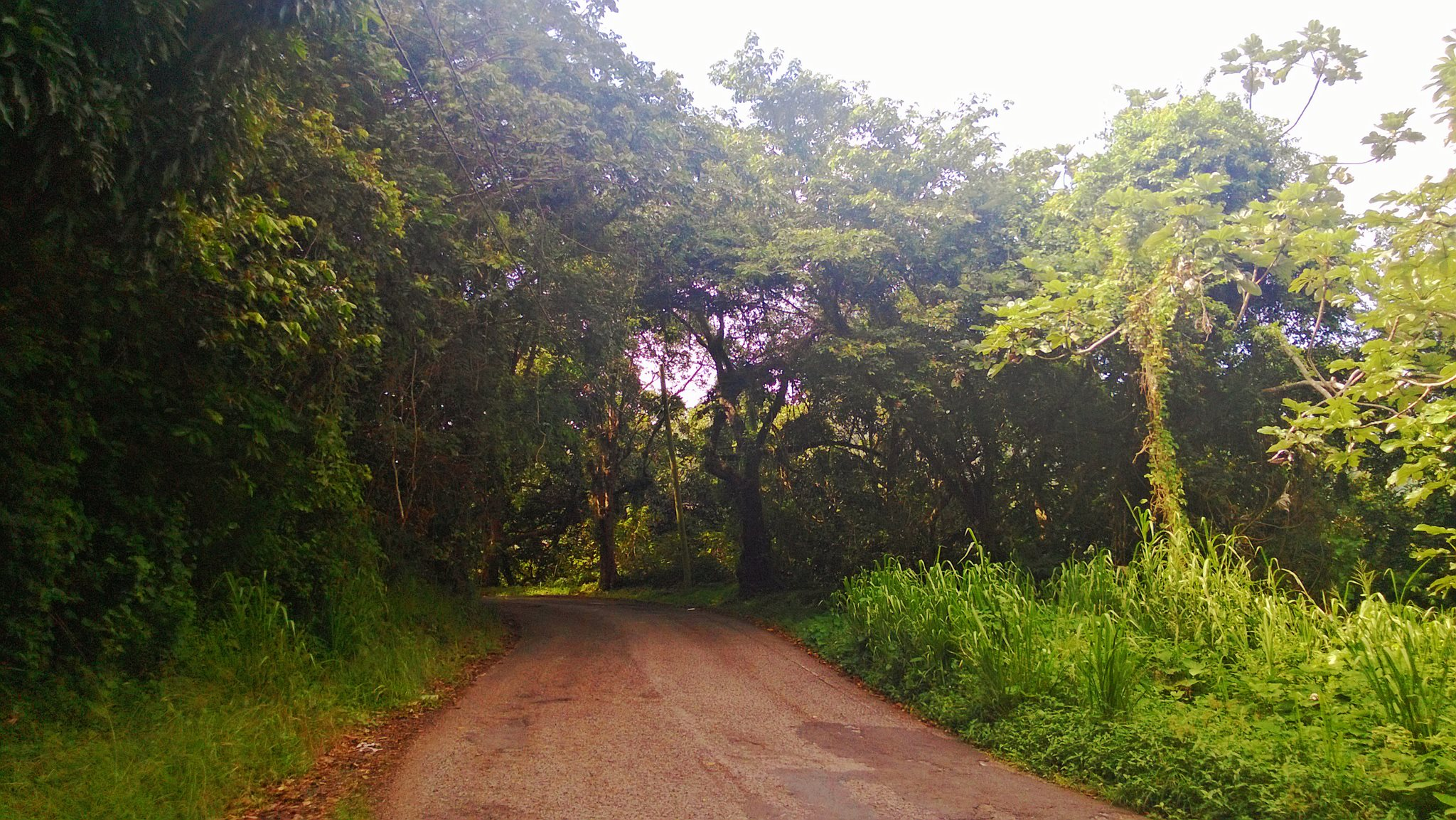
- Puerto Rico Highway 15 between Palmas and Guamaní

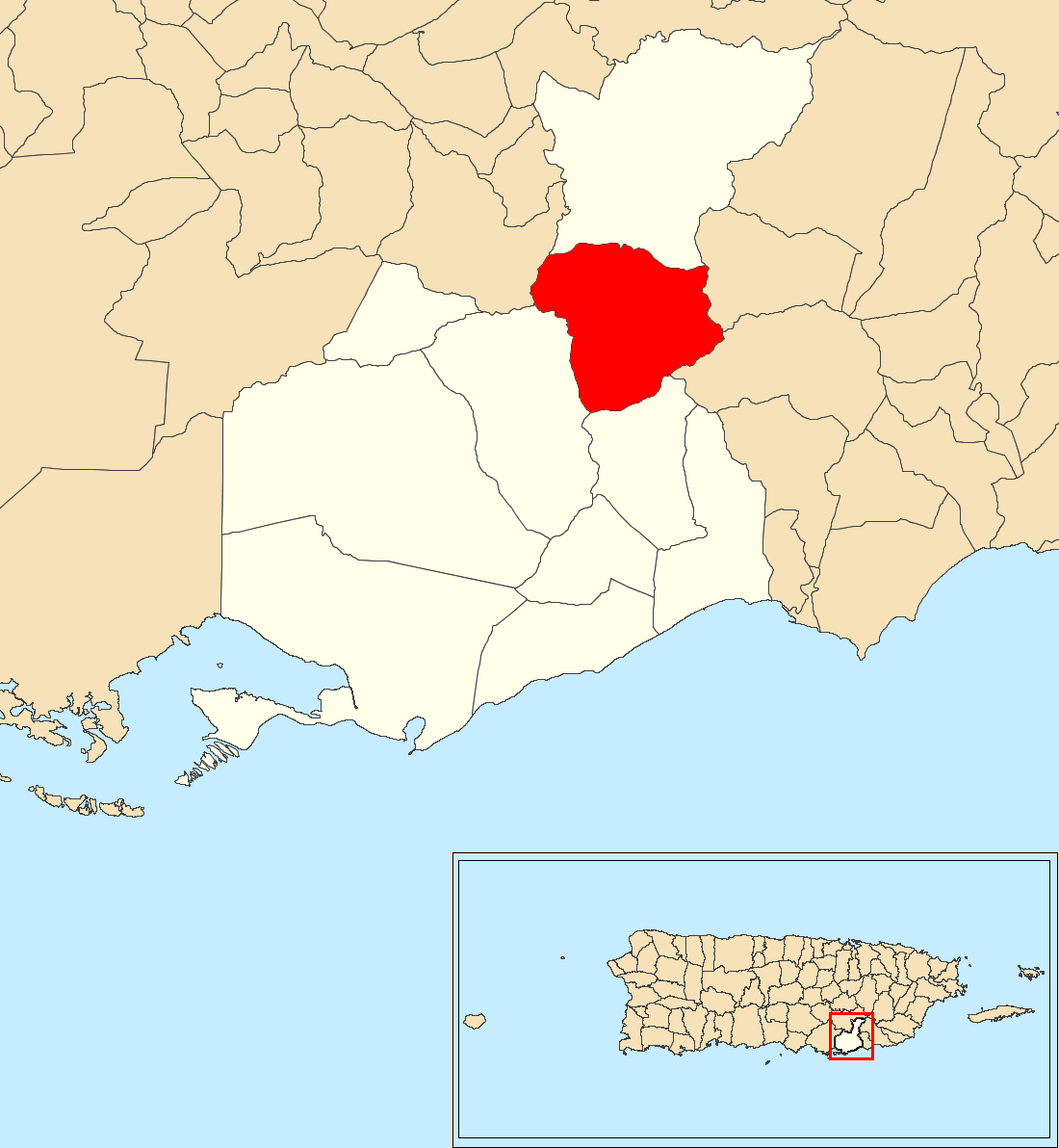
- Location of Guamaní within the municipality of Guayama shown in red

- Location of Puerto Rico
- Coordinates: 18°02′09″N 66°06′22″W
- Commonwealth: Puerto Rico
- Municipality: Guayama

Area
  - Total: 5.81 sq mi (15.0 km^{2})
  - Land: 5.81 sq mi (15.0 km^{2})
  - Water: 0 sq mi (0 km^{2})
- Elevation: 764 ft (233 m)

Population (2010)
  - Total: 1,455
  - Density: 250.4/sq mi (96.7/km^{2})
- Source: 2010 Census
- Time zone: UTC−4 (AST)
- ZIP Code: 00784

Guamaní is a barrio in the municipality of Guayama, Puerto Rico. Its population in 2010 was 1,455.

== History ==
Guamaní was in Spain's gazetteers until Puerto Rico was ceded by Spain in the aftermath of the Spanish–American War under the terms of the Treaty of Paris of 1898 and became an unincorporated territory of the United States. In 1899, the United States Department of War conducted a census of Puerto Rico finding that the population of Guamaní barrio was 1,360.

Historical population
Census	Pop.	Note	%±
1900	1,360		—
1910	1,359		−0.1%
1920	1,492		9.8%
1930	1,637		9.7%
1940	1,974		20.6%
1950	2,232		13.1%
1960	1,613		−27.7%
1970	1,793		11.2%
1980	1,577		−12.0%
1990	1,645		4.3%
2000	1,528		−7.1%
2010	1,455		−4.8%
U.S. Decennial Census; 1899 (shown as 1900) 1910-1930; 1930-1950 1980-2000 2010

== See also ==
- List of communities in Puerto Rico
