= Guamaní River =

River of Puerto Rico

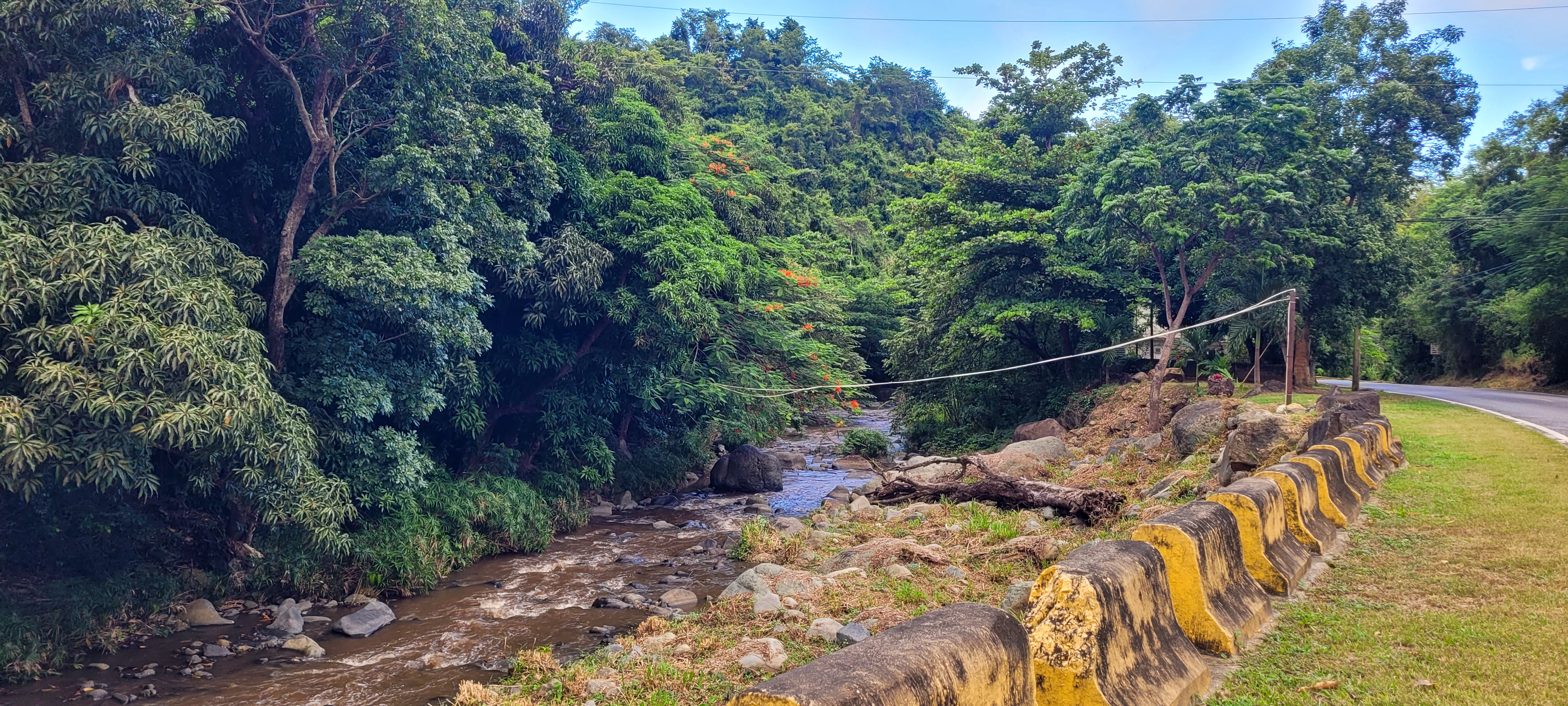
- Guamaní River from Puerto Rico Highway 179
- Native name: Río Guamaní (Spanish)

Location
- Commonwealth: Puerto Rico
- Municipality: Guayama

Physical characteristics
- Source
  - coordinates: 17.9430233°N 66.1337769°W

The Guamaní River (Spanish: Río Guamaní) is a river of Guayama, Puerto Rico. In 1928, the Public Works department of Puerto Rico spent approximately $183,000 on a risk mitigation project at Guamaní River. There is a 30-meter truss bridge over the Guamaní River in Guayama, which was built in 1936, under a Franklin D. Roosevelt New Deal program.

== See also ==
- Cayey Bridge: river crossing on the NRHP
- List of rivers of Puerto Rico
