= Culebras Bajo, Cayey, Puerto Rico =

Barrio of Puerto Rico

Culebras Bajo
- Barrio
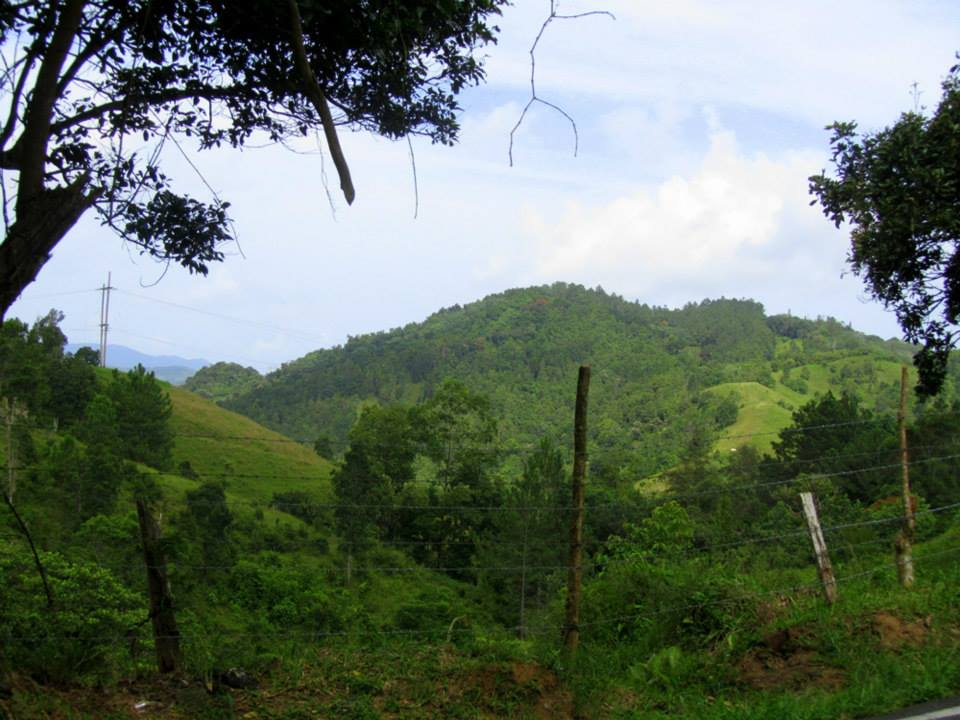
- Mountains in Culebras Bajo

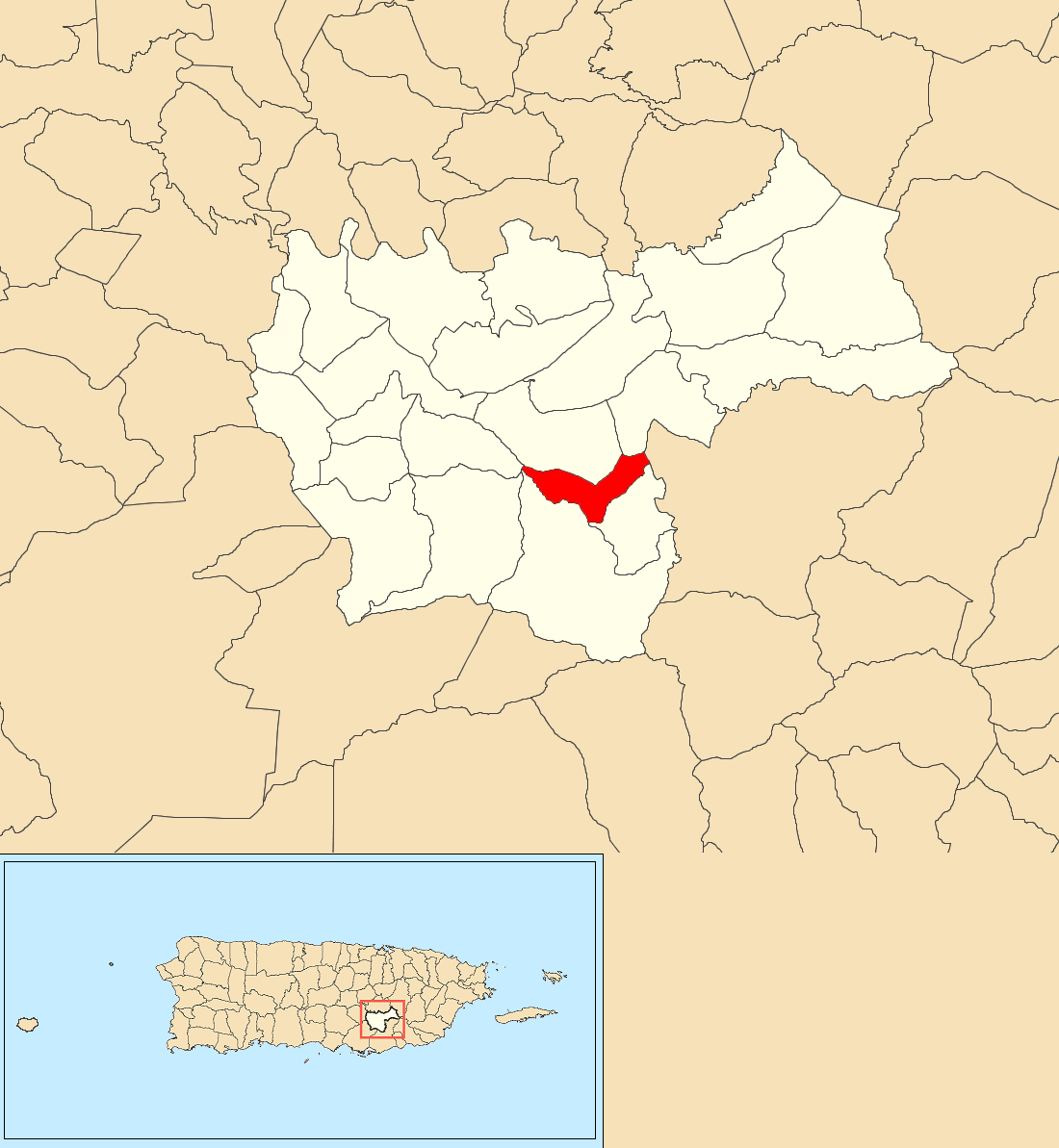
- Location of Culebras Bajo within the municipality of Cayey shown in red

- Location of Puerto Rico
- Coordinates: 18°04′50″N 66°08′33″W
- Commonwealth: Puerto Rico
- Municipality: Cayey

Area
  - Total: 0.96 sq mi (2.5 km^{2})
  - Land: 0.96 sq mi (2.5 km^{2})
  - Water: 0 sq mi (0 km^{2})
- Elevation: 2,510 ft (770 m)

Population (2010)
  - Total: 238
  - Density: 250.5/sq mi (96.7/km^{2})
- Source: 2010 Census
- Time zone: UTC−4 (AST)

Culebras Bajo is a barrio in the municipality of Cayey, Puerto Rico. Its population in 2010 was 238.

== History ==
Culebras Bajo was in Spain's gazetteers until Puerto Rico was ceded by Spain in the aftermath of the Spanish–American War under the terms of the Treaty of Paris of 1898 and became an unincorporated territory of the United States. In 1899, the United States Department of War conducted a census of Puerto Rico finding that the combined population of Culebras Bajo, Quebrada Arriba, and Culebras Alto barrios was 914.

Historical population
Census	Pop.	Note	%±
1910	275		—
1920	397		44.4%
1930	684		72.3%
1940	417		−39.0%
1950	392		−6.0%
1960	284		−27.6%
1970	251		−11.6%
1980	274		9.2%
1990	217		−20.8%
2000	292		34.6%
2010	238		−18.5%
U.S. Decennial Census; 1900 (N/A) 1910-1930; 1930-1950 1980-2000 2010

== See also ==
- List of communities in Puerto Rico
