= Culebras Alto, Cayey, Puerto Rico =

Barrio of Puerto Rico

Culebras Alto
- Barrio
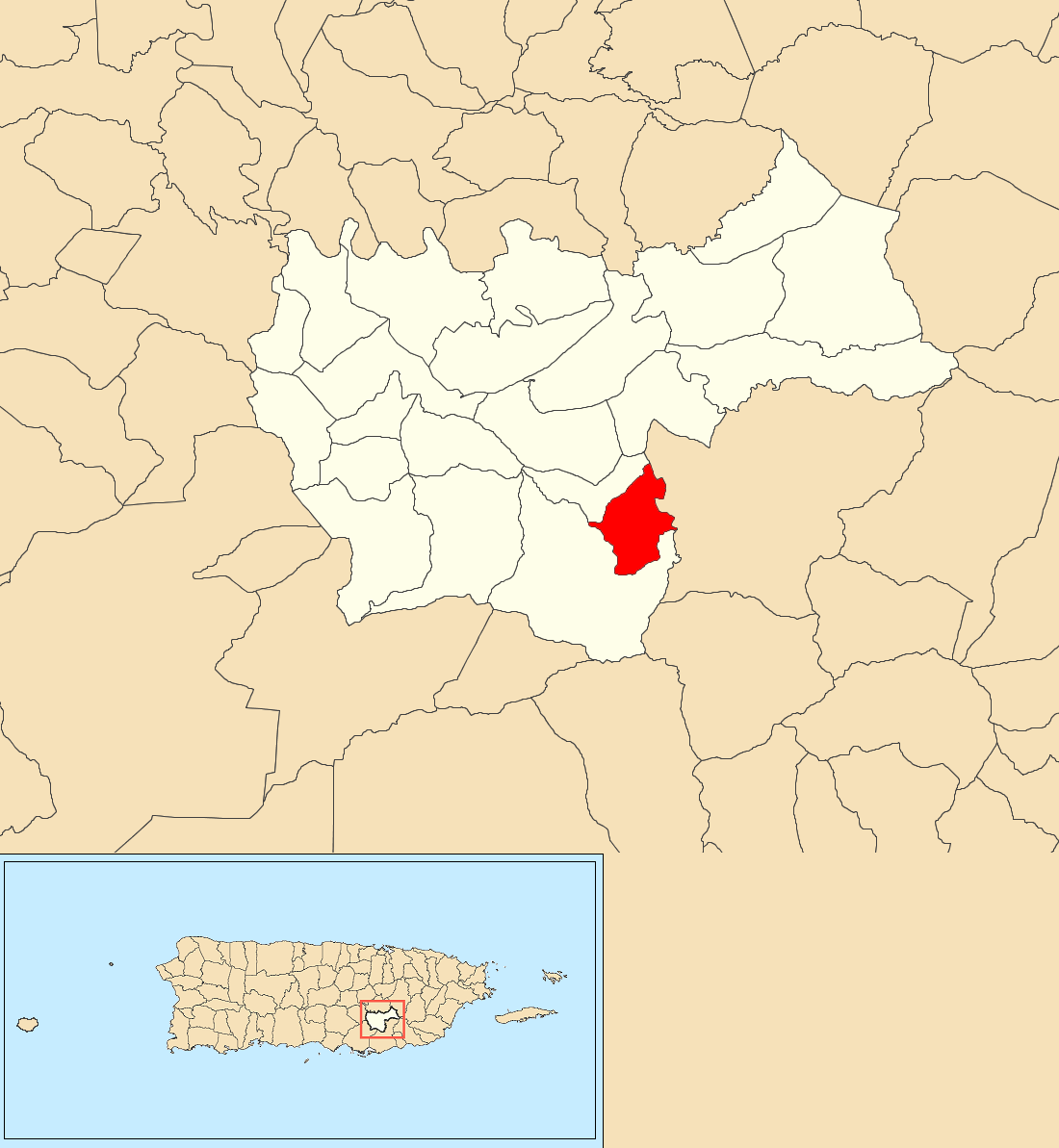
- Location of Culebras Alto within the municipality of Cayey shown in red

- Location of Puerto Rico
- Coordinates: 18°04′17″N 66°07′51″W
- Commonwealth: Puerto Rico
- Municipality: Cayey

Area
  - Total: 1.32 sq mi (3.4 km^{2})
  - Land: 1.32 sq mi (3.4 km^{2})
  - Water: 0 sq mi (0 km^{2})
- Elevation: 2,526 ft (770 m)

Population (2010)
  - Total: 252
  - Density: 190.9/sq mi (73.7/km^{2})
- Source: 2010 Census
- Time zone: UTC−4 (AST)

Culebras Alto is a barrio in the municipality of Cayey, Puerto Rico. Its population in 2010 was 252.

== History ==
Culebras Alto was in Spain's gazetteers until Puerto Rico was ceded by Spain in the aftermath of the Spanish–American War under the terms of the Treaty of Paris of 1898 and became an unincorporated territory of the United States. In 1899, the United States Department of War conducted a census of Puerto Rico finding that the combined population of Culebras Alto, Quebrada Arriba, and Culebras Bajo barrios was 914.

Historical population
Census	Pop.	Note	%±
1910	168		—
1920	206		22.6%
1930	262		27.2%
1940	216		−17.6%
1950	251		16.2%
1960	171		−31.9%
1970	130		−24.0%
1980	160		23.1%
1990	284		77.5%
2000	68		−76.1%
2010	252		270.6%
U.S. Decennial Census; 1900 (N/A) 1910-1930; 1930-1950 1980-2000 2010

== See also ==
- List of communities in Puerto Rico
