= Quebrada Arriba, Cayey, Puerto Rico =

Barrio of Puerto Rico

Quebrada Arriba
- Barrio
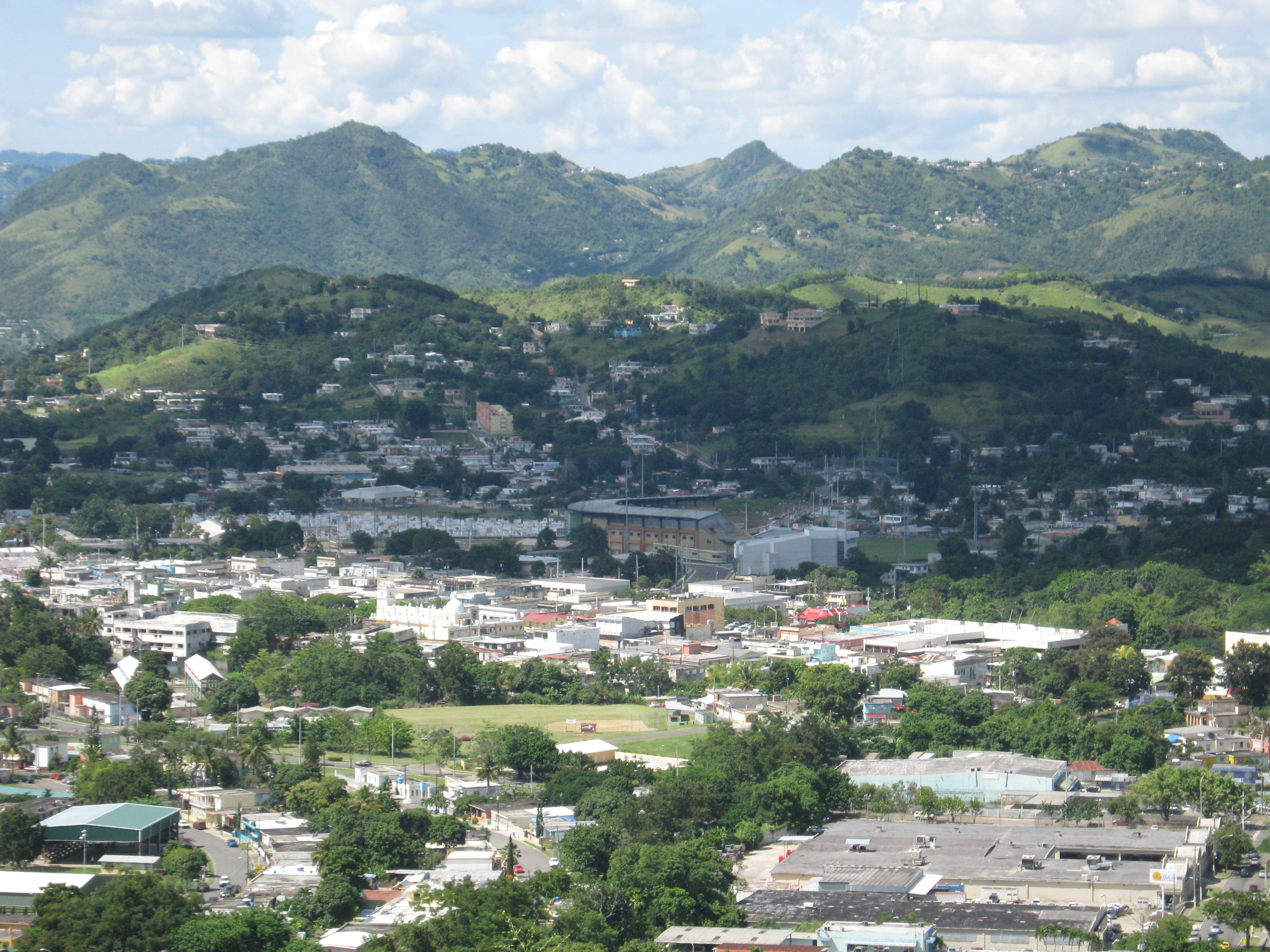
- View from Quebrada Arriba

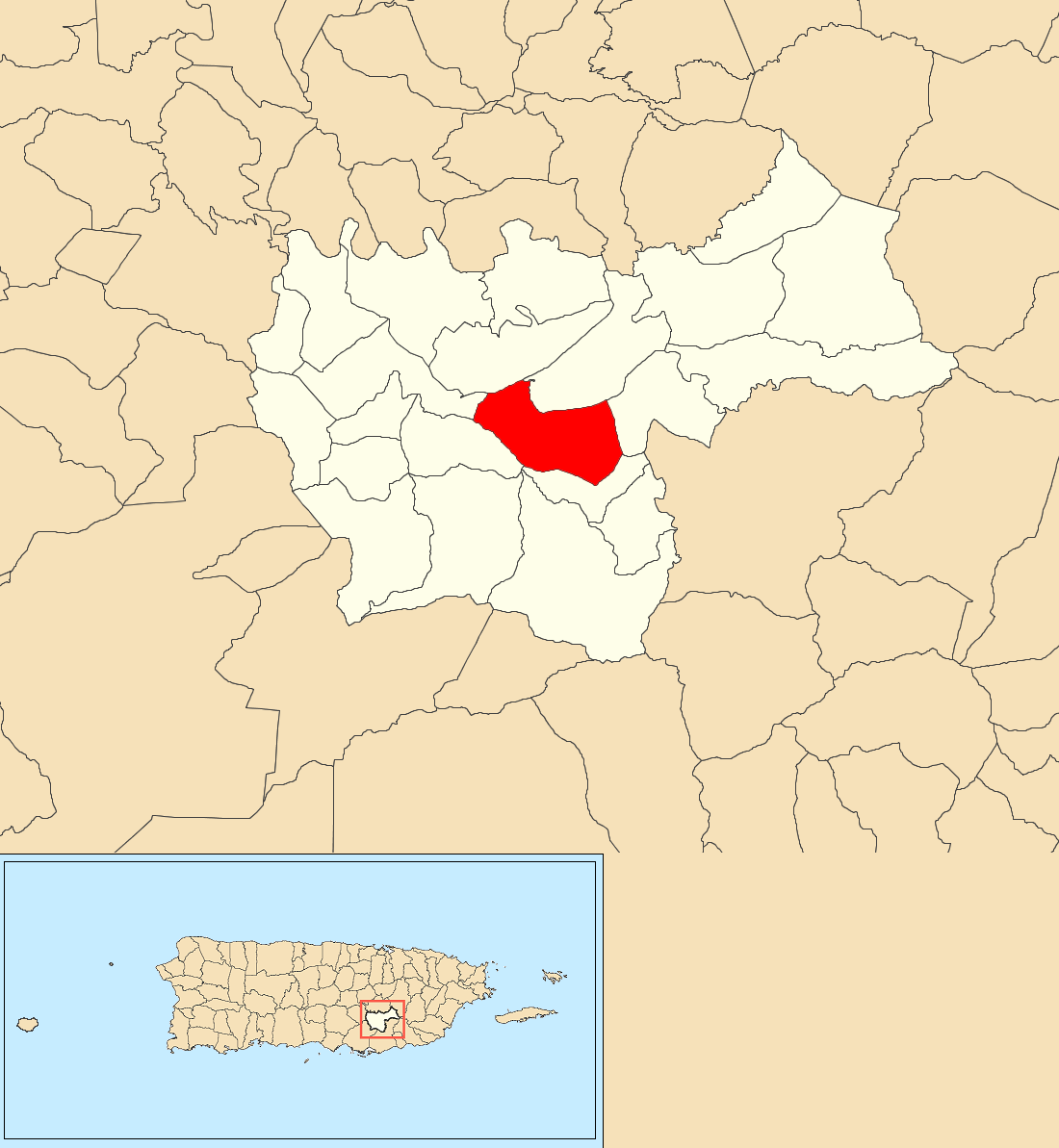
- Location of Quebrada Arriba within the municipality of Cayey shown in red

- Location of Puerto Rico
- Coordinates: 18°05′37″N 66°09′05″W
- Commonwealth: Puerto Rico
- Municipality: Cayey

Area
  - Total: 2.4 sq mi (6.2 km^{2})
  - Land: 2.4 sq mi (6.2 km^{2})
  - Water: 0 sq mi (0 km^{2})
- Elevation: 2,461 ft (750 m)

Population (2010)
  - Total: 1,451
  - Density: 604.6/sq mi (233.4/km^{2})
- Source: 2010 Census
- Time zone: UTC−4 (AST)

Quebrada Arriba is a barrio in the municipality of Cayey, Puerto Rico. Its population in 2010 was 1,451.

== History ==
Quebrada Arriba was in Spain's gazetteers until Puerto Rico was ceded by Spain in the aftermath of the Spanish–American War under the terms of the Treaty of Paris of 1898 and became an unincorporated territory of the United States. In 1899, the United States Department of War conducted a census of Puerto Rico finding that the combined population of Quebrada Arriba, Culebras Alto and Culebras Bajo barrios was 914.

Historical population
Census	Pop.	Note	%±
1910	406		—
1920	937		130.8%
1930	1,381		47.4%
1940	1,721		24.6%
1950	1,129		−34.4%
1960	1,320		16.9%
1970	1,362		3.2%
1980	965		−29.1%
1990	1,114		15.4%
2000	1,134		1.8%
2010	1,451		28.0%
U.S. Decennial Census; 1900 (N/A) 1910-1930; 1930-1950 1980-2000 2010

== See also ==
- List of communities in Puerto Rico
