= Carite, Guayama, Puerto Rico =

Barrio of Puerto Rico

Carite
- Barrio
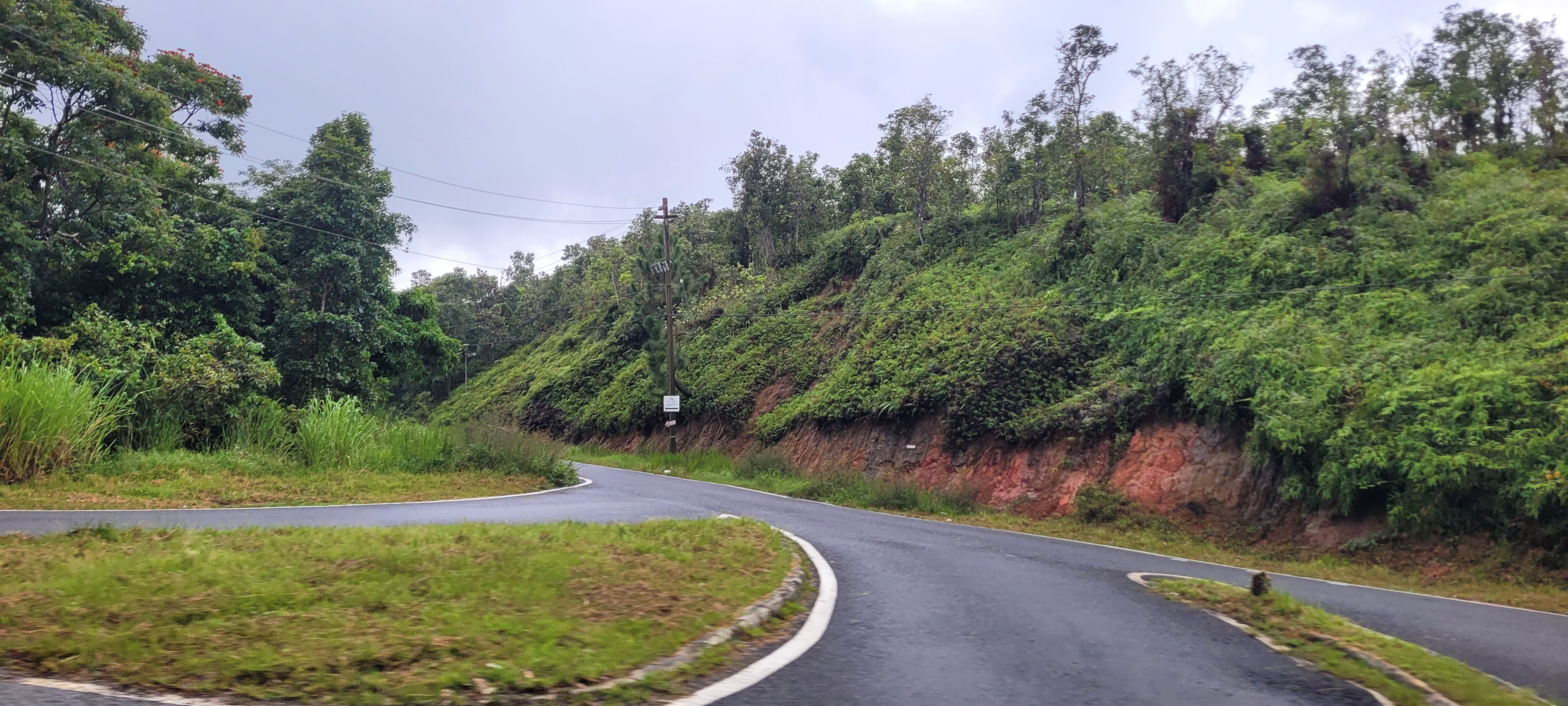
- Puerto Rico Highway 742 in Carite

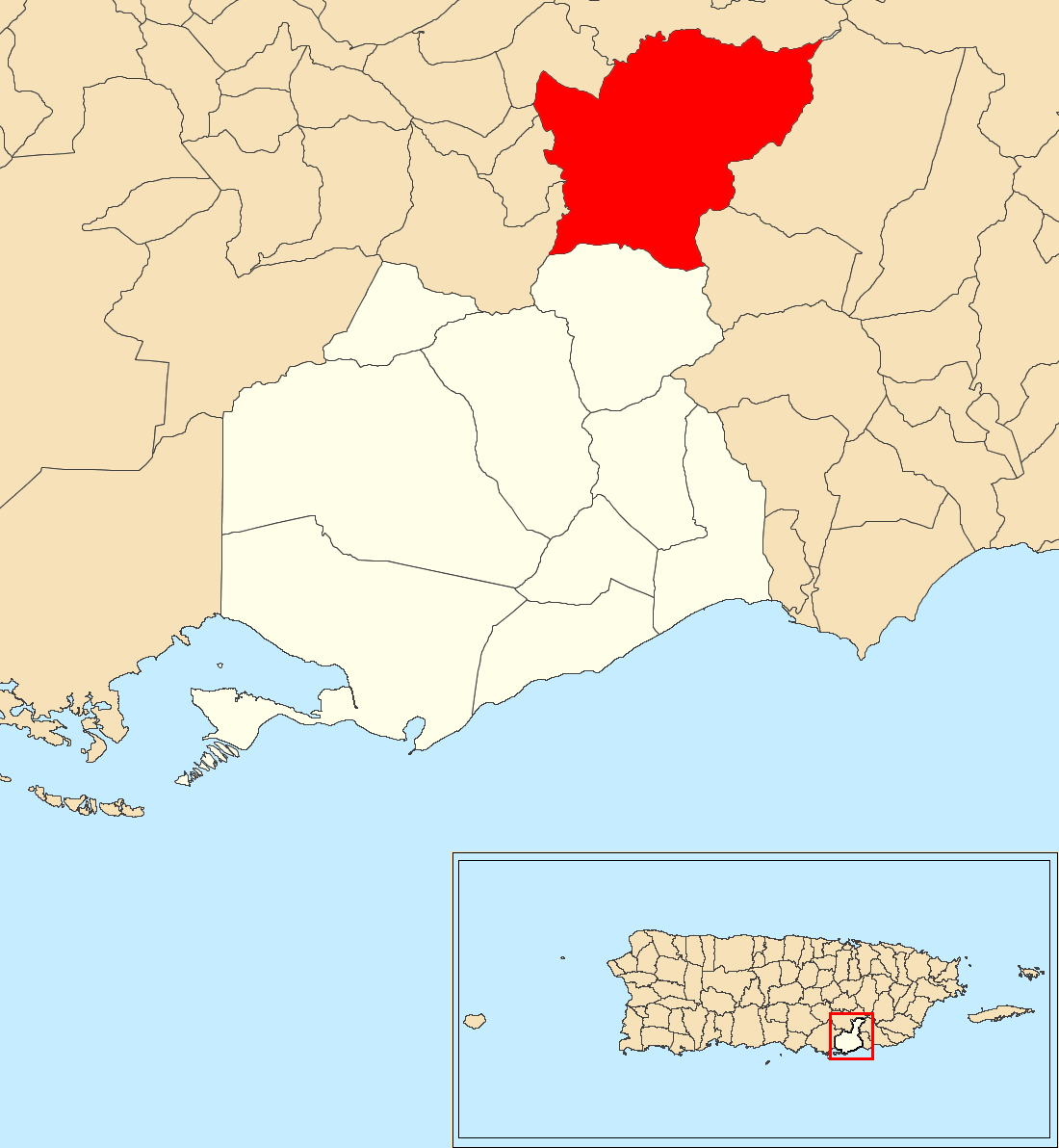
- Location of Carite within the municipality of Guayama shown in red

- Location of Puerto Rico
- Coordinates: 18°04′56″N 66°05′33″W
- Commonwealth: Puerto Rico
- Municipality: Guayama

Area
  - Total: 11.46 sq mi (29.7 km^{2})
  - Land: 11.00 sq mi (28.5 km^{2})
  - Water: 0.46 sq mi (1.2 km^{2})
- Elevation: 1,886 ft (575 m)

Population (2010)
  - Total: 1,210
  - Density: 110/sq mi (42/km^{2})
- Source: 2010 Census
- Time zone: UTC−4 (AST)
- ZIP Code: 00784

Carite is a barrio in the municipality of Guayama, Puerto Rico. Its population in 2010 was 1,210.

== History ==
Carite was in Spain's gazetteers until Puerto Rico was ceded by Spain in the aftermath of the Spanish–American War under the terms of the Treaty of Paris of 1898 and became an unincorporated territory of the United States. In 1899, the United States Department of War conducted a census of Puerto Rico finding that the population of Carite barrio was 834.

Historical population
| Census | Pop. | Note | %± |
|---|---|---|---|
| 1900 | 834 | | — |
| 1910 | 1,109 | | 33.0% |
| 1920 | 1,324 | | 19.4% |
| 1930 | 1,039 | | −21.5% |
| 1940 | 1,102 | | 6.1% |
| 1950 | 781 | | −29.1% |
| 1960 | 1,024 | | 31.1% |
| 1970 | 946 | | −7.6% |
| 1980 | 1,160 | | 22.6% |
| 1990 | 1,126 | | −2.9% |
| 2000 | 1,157 | | 2.8% |
| 2010 | 1,210 | | 4.6% |
U.S. Decennial Census; 1899 (shown as 1900) 1910-1930; 1930-1950 1980-2000 2010

== See also ==
- List of communities in Puerto Rico
