= Caimital =

Barrio of Guayama, Puerto Rico

- Barrio
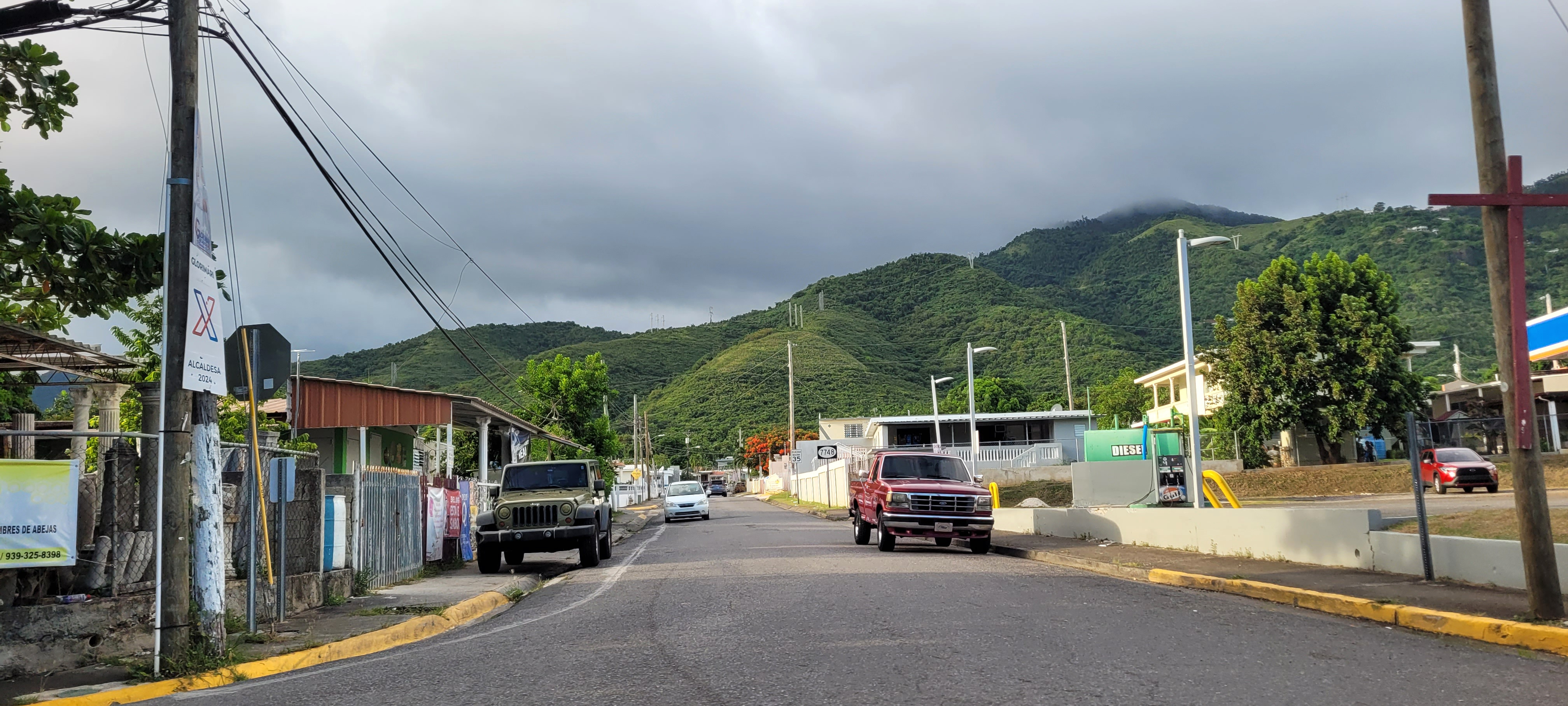
- Puerto Rico Highway 7748 in Caimital

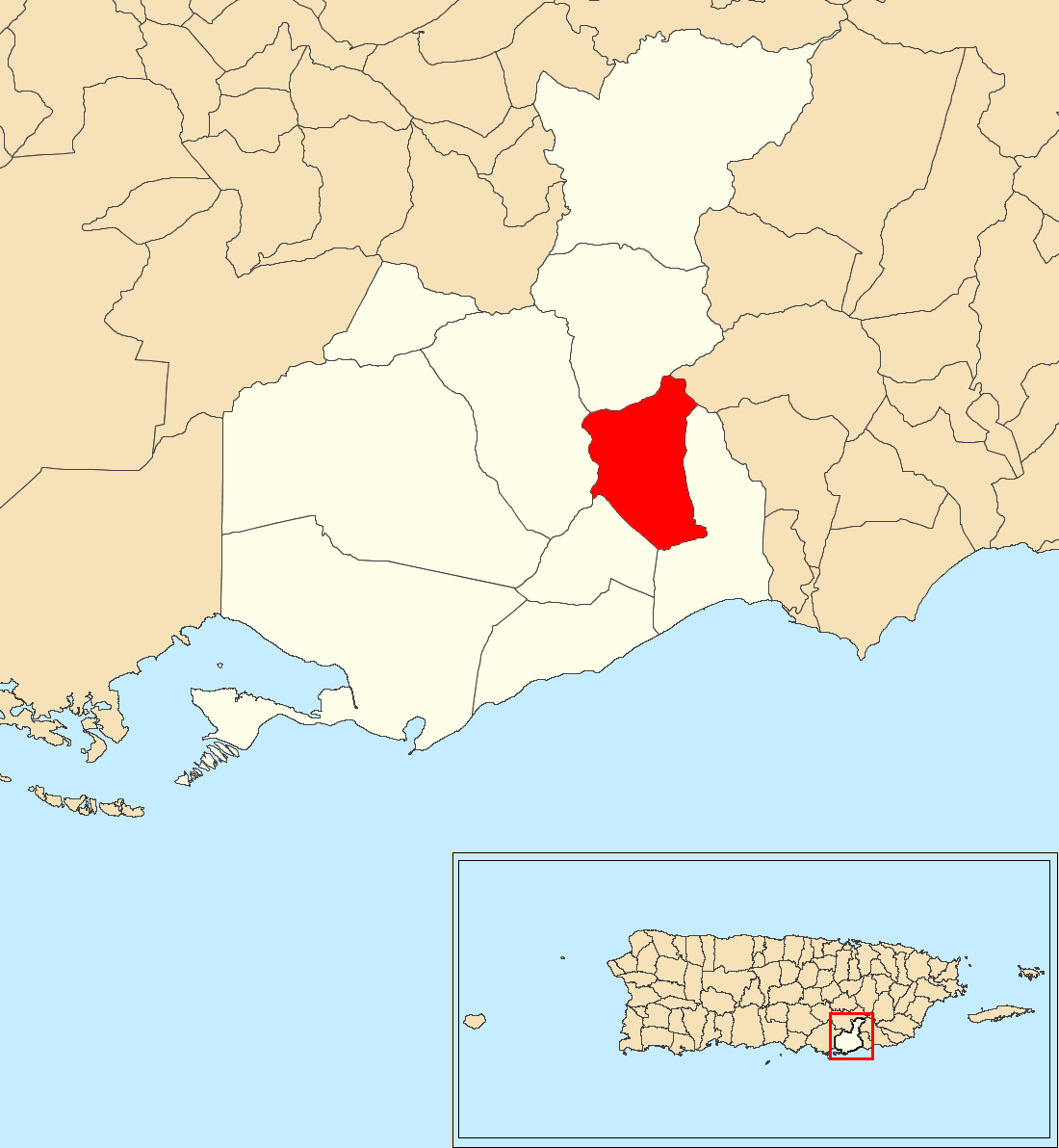
- Location of Caimital within the municipality of Guayama shown in red

- Location of Puerto Rico
- Coordinates: 18°00′00″N 66°06′03″W
- Commonwealth: Puerto Rico
- Municipality: Guayama

Area
  - Total: 3.55 sq mi (9.2 km^{2})
  - Land: 3.55 sq mi (9.2 km^{2})
  - Water: 0 sq mi (0 km^{2})
- Elevation: 272 ft (83 m)

Population (2010)
  - Total: 4,124
  - Density: 1,161.7/sq mi (448.5/km^{2})
- Source: 2010 Census
- Time zone: UTC−4 (AST)
- ZIP Code: 00784

Caimital is a barrio in the municipality of Guayama, Puerto Rico. Its population in 2010 was 4,124.

== History ==
Caimital was in Spain's gazetteers until Puerto Rico was ceded by Spain in the aftermath of the Spanish–American War under the terms of the Treaty of Paris of 1898 and became an unincorporated territory of the United States. In 1899, the United States Department of War conducted a census of Puerto Rico finding that the population of Caimital barrio was 603.

Historical population
Census	Pop.	Note	%±
1900	603		—
1910	859		42.5%
1920	1,068		24.3%
1930	1,428		33.7%
1940	1,369		−4.1%
1950	984		−28.1%
1960	2,164		119.9%
1970	3,044		40.7%
1980	3,668		20.5%
1990	4,043		10.2%
2000	4,505		11.4%
2010	4,124		−8.5%
U.S. Decennial Census; 1899 (shown as 1900) 1910-1930; 1930-1950 1980-2000 2010

== See also ==
- List of communities in Puerto Rico
