= Palmas, Guayama, Puerto Rico =

Barrio of Puerto Rico

Palmas
- Barrio
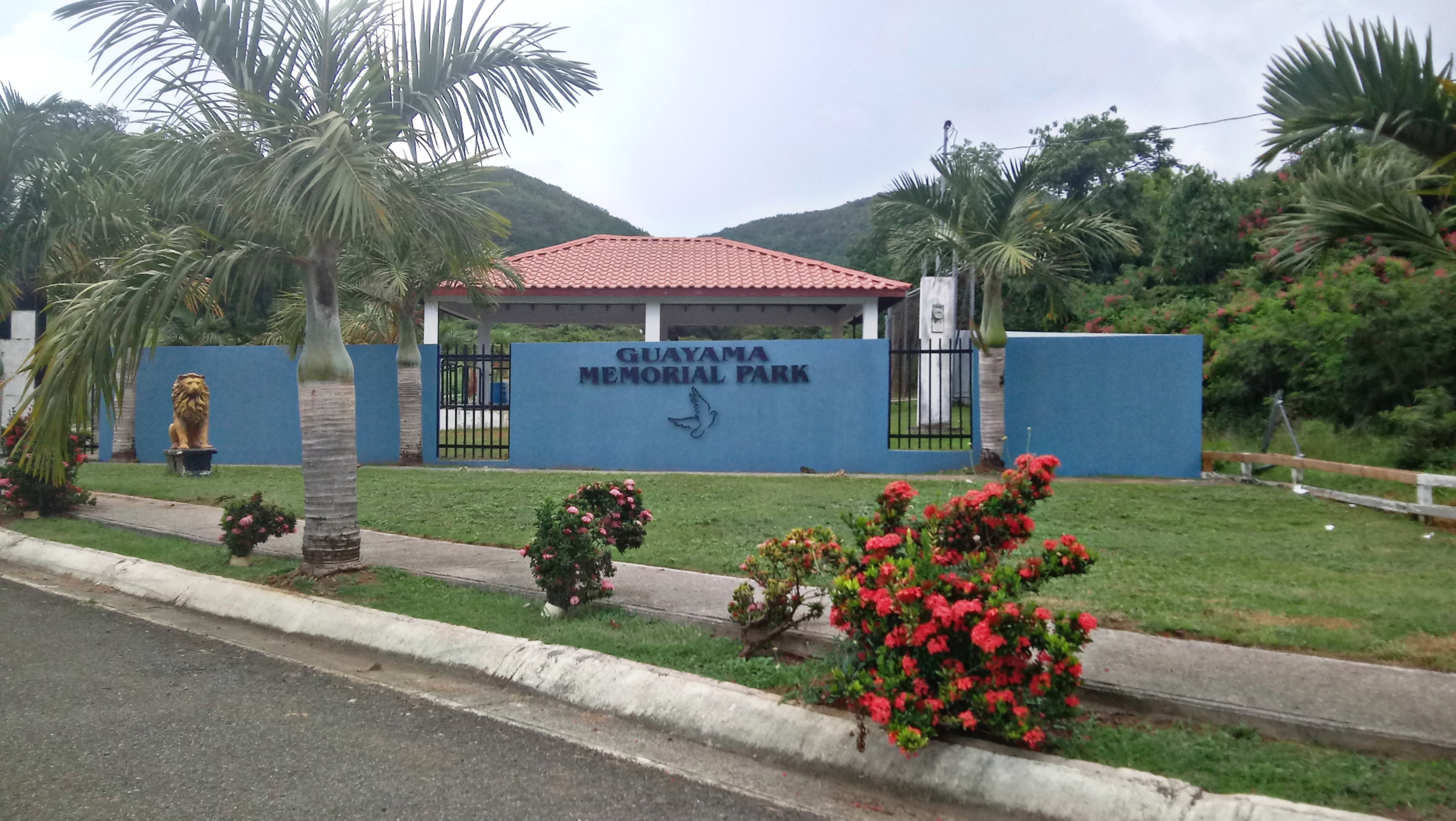
- Cemetery in Palmas

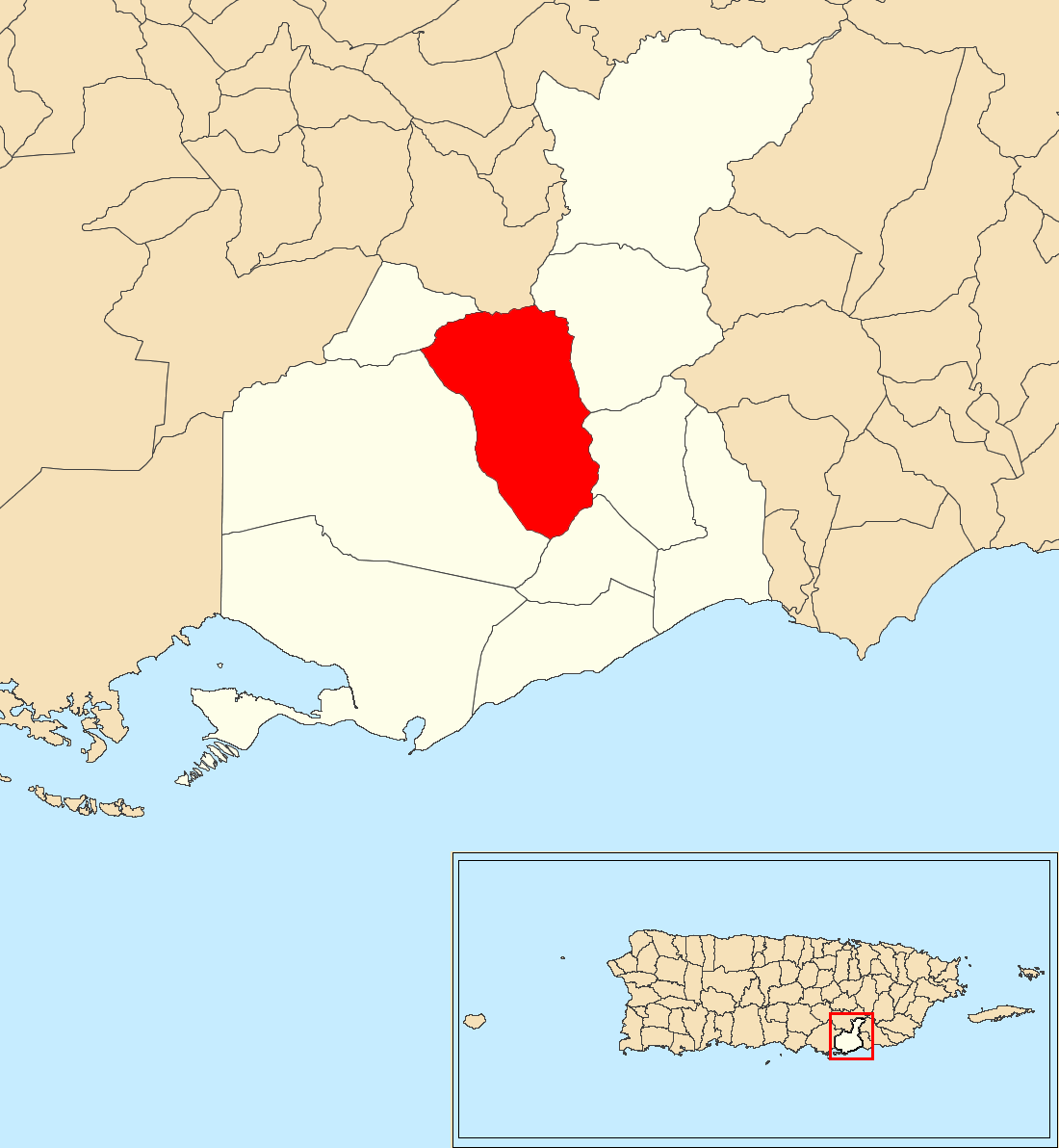
- Location of Palmas within the municipality of Guayama shown in red

- Location of Puerto Rico
- Coordinates: 18°00′39″N 66°08′01″W
- Commonwealth: Puerto Rico
- Municipality: Guayama

Area
  - Total: 6.73 sq mi (17.4 km^{2})
  - Land: 6.73 sq mi (17.4 km^{2})
  - Water: 0 sq mi (0 km^{2})
- Elevation: 1,211 ft (369 m)

Population (2010)
  - Total: 709
  - Density: 105.3/sq mi (40.7/km^{2})
- Source: 2010 Census
- Time zone: UTC−4 (AST)
- ZIP Code: 00784

Palmas is a barrio in the municipality of Guayama, Puerto Rico. Its population in 2010 was 709.

== History ==
Palmas was in Spain's gazetteers until Puerto Rico was ceded by Spain in the aftermath of the Spanish–American War under the terms of the Treaty of Paris of 1898 and became an unincorporated territory of the United States. In 1899, the United States Department of War conducted a census of Puerto Rico finding that the population of Palmas barrio was 1,200.

Historical population
Census	Pop.	Note	%±
1900	1,200		—
1910	1,154		−3.8%
1920	998		−13.5%
1930	874		−12.4%
1940	856		−2.1%
1950	1,197		39.8%
1960	879		−26.6%
1970	682		−22.4%
1980	1,035		51.8%
1990	861		−16.8%
2000	841		−2.3%
2010	709		−15.7%
U.S. Decennial Census; 1899 (shown as 1900) 1910-1930; 1930-1950 1980-2000 2010

== See also ==
- List of communities in Puerto Rico
